= List of churches in Budapest =

The list below arranges churches in Budapest by city district.

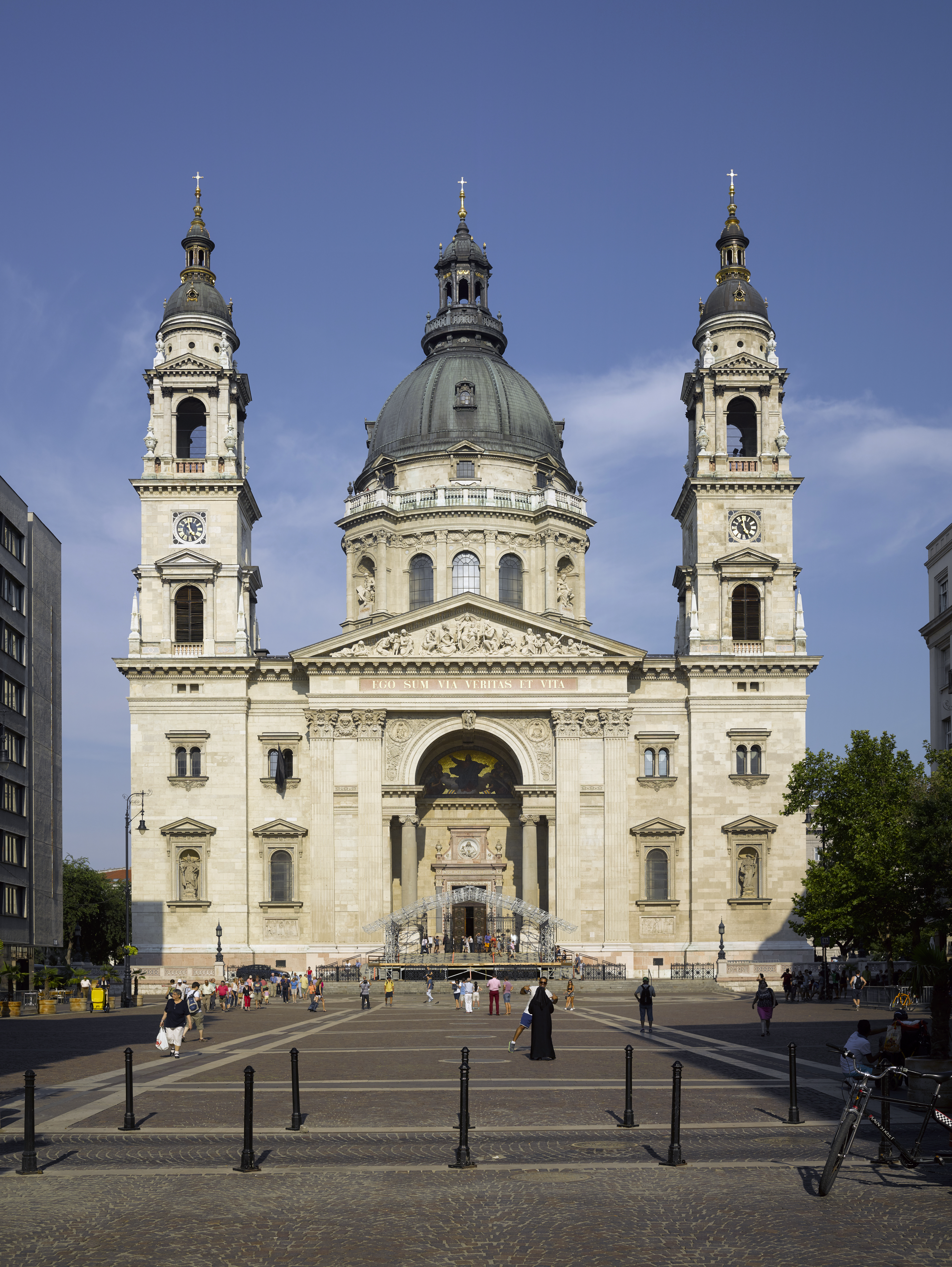

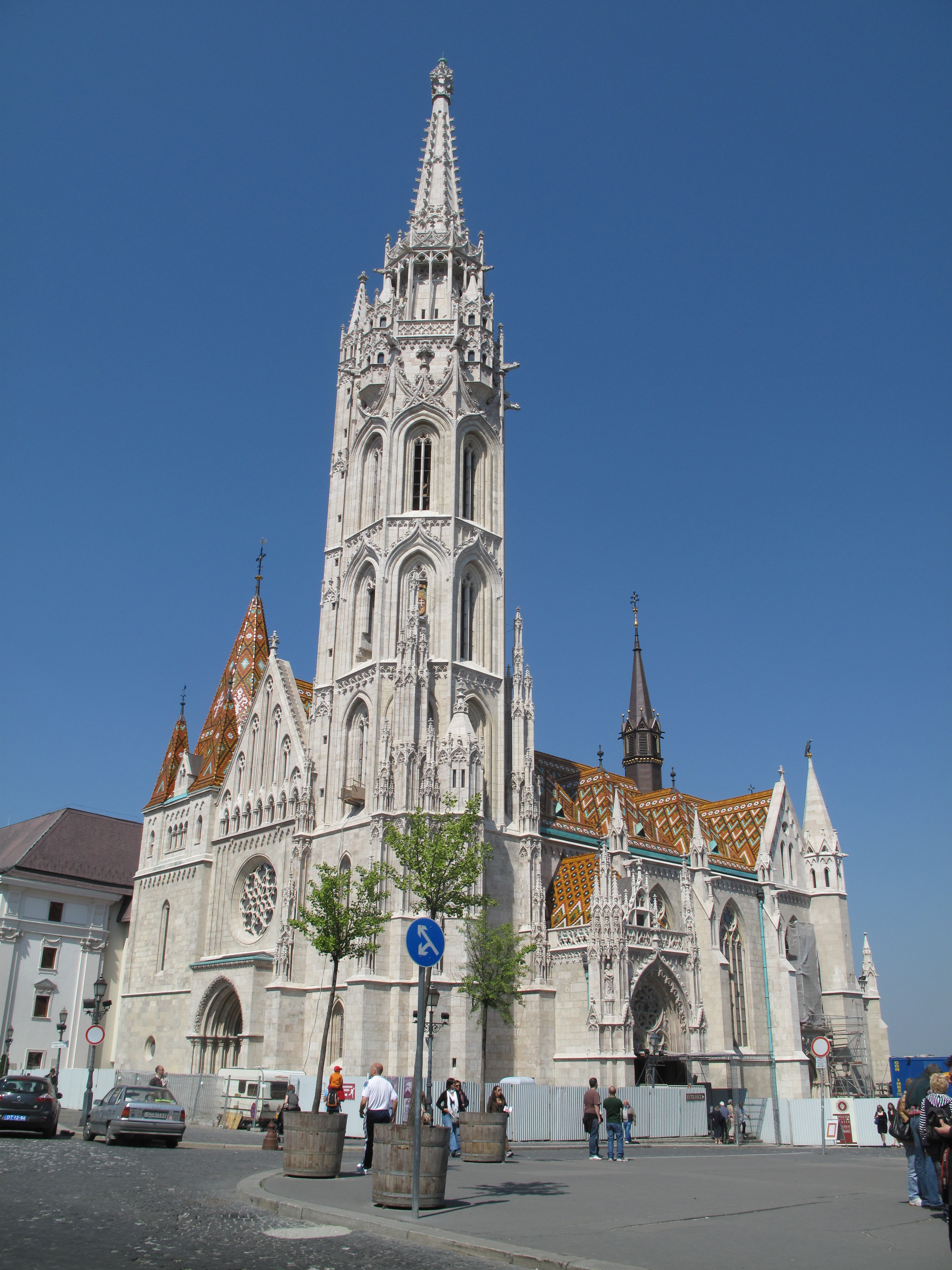

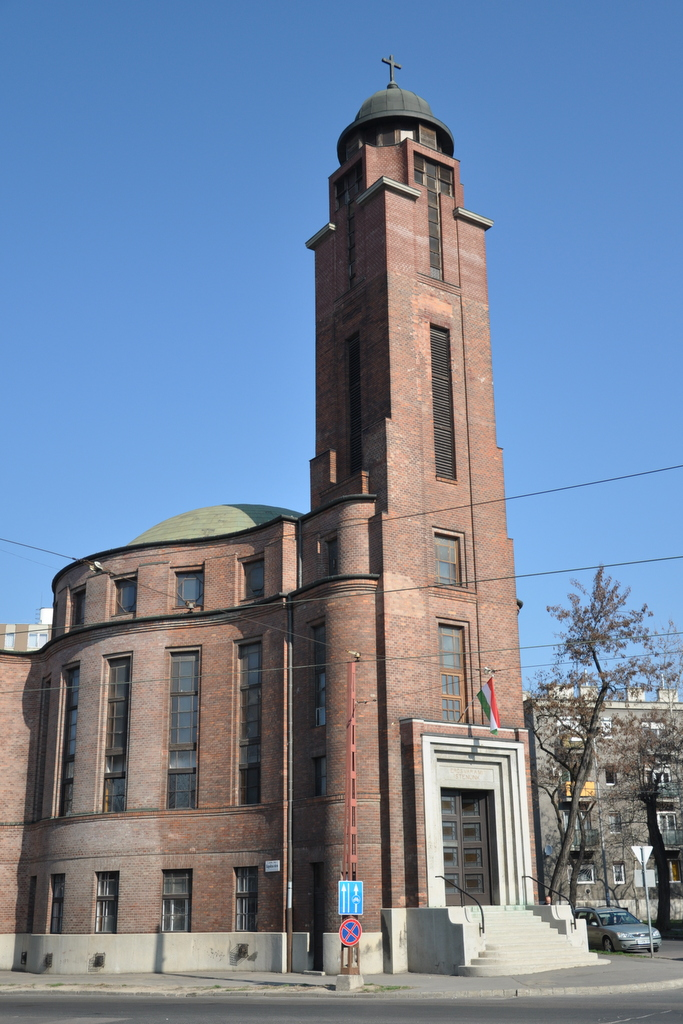

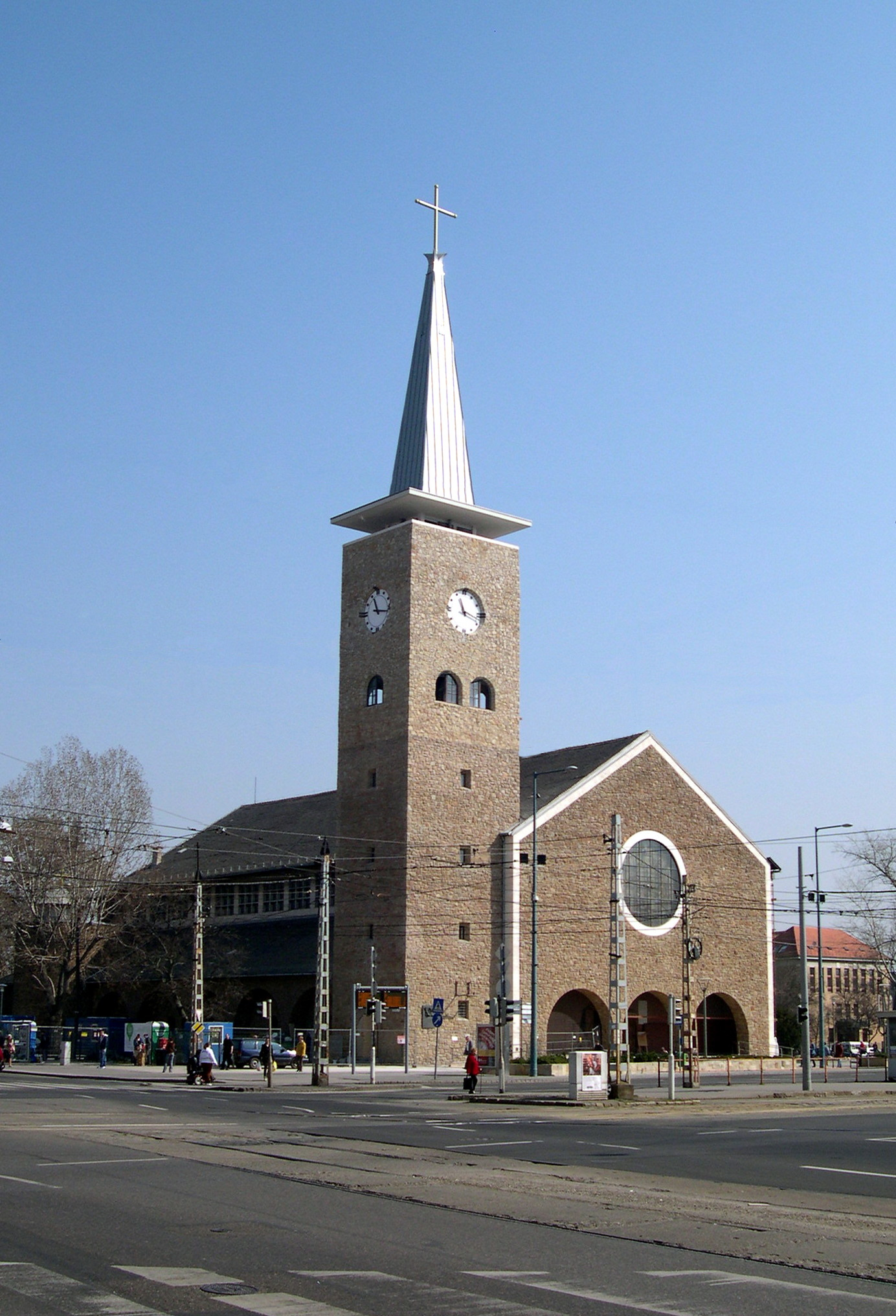

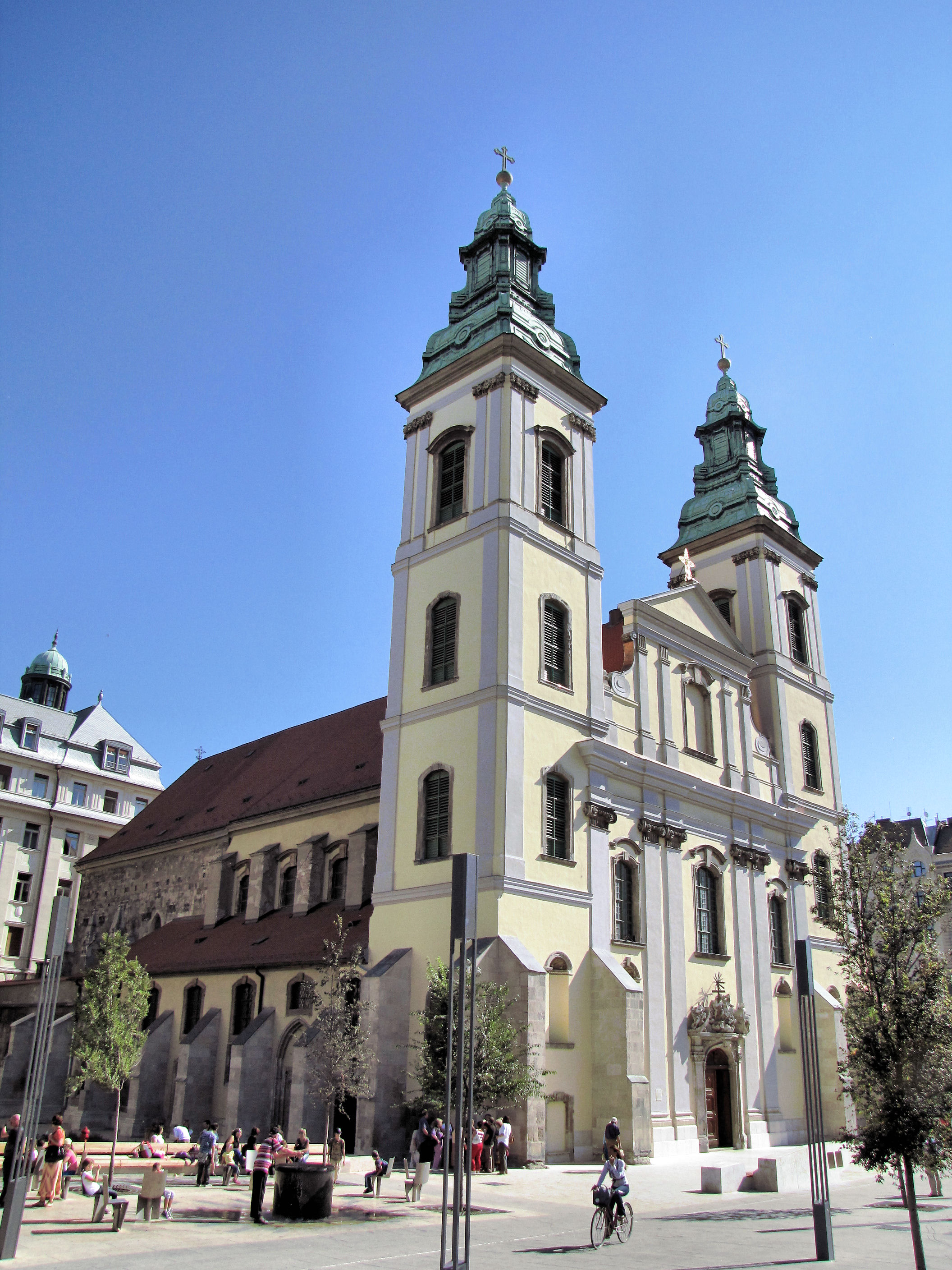

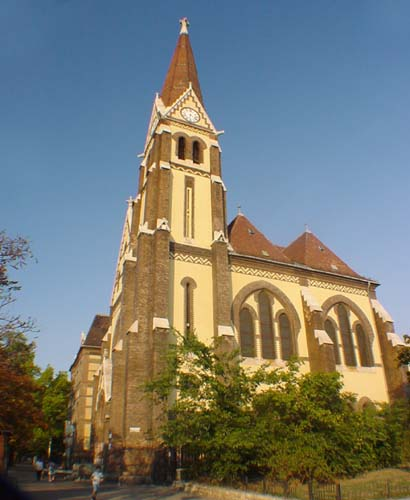

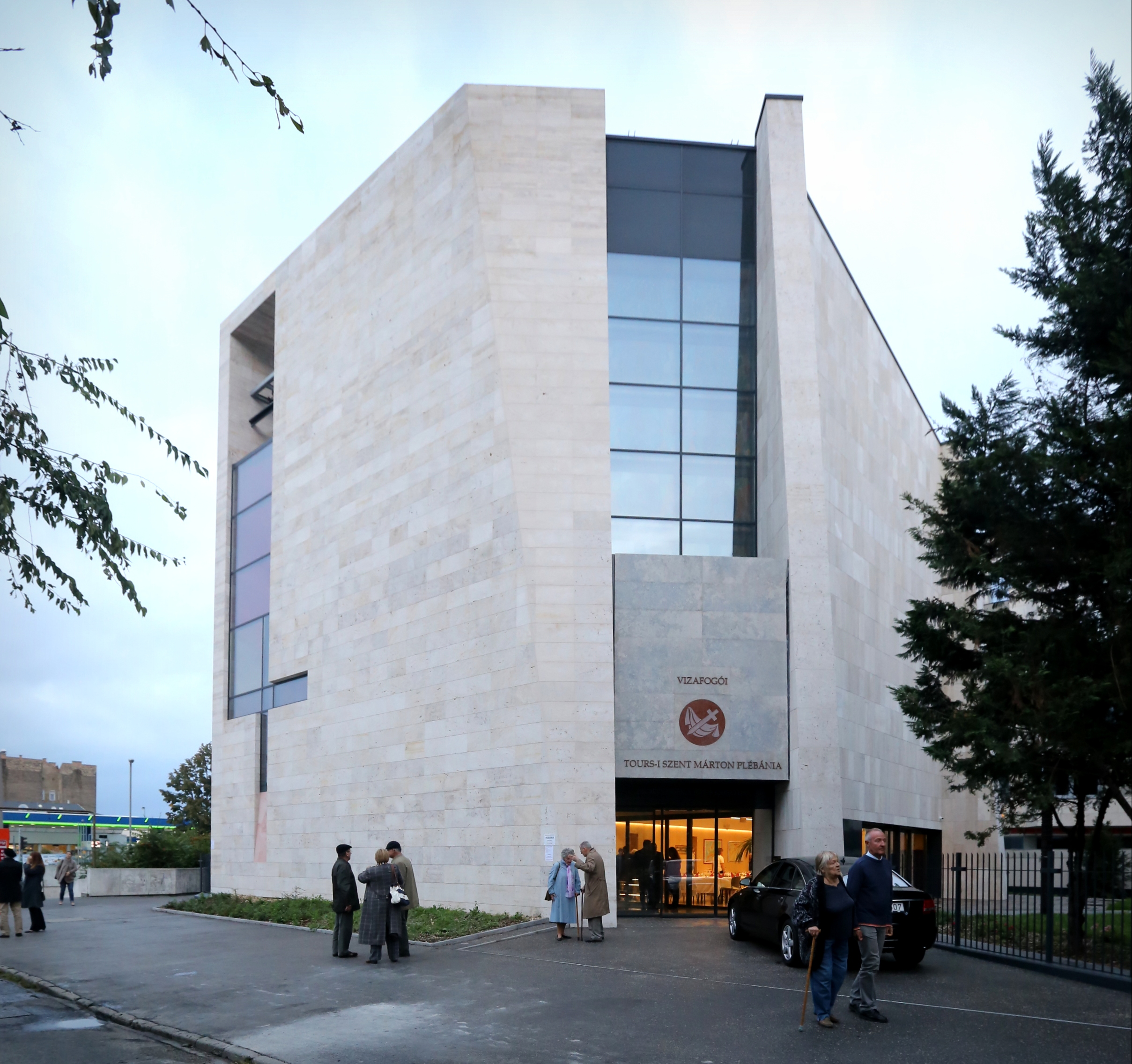

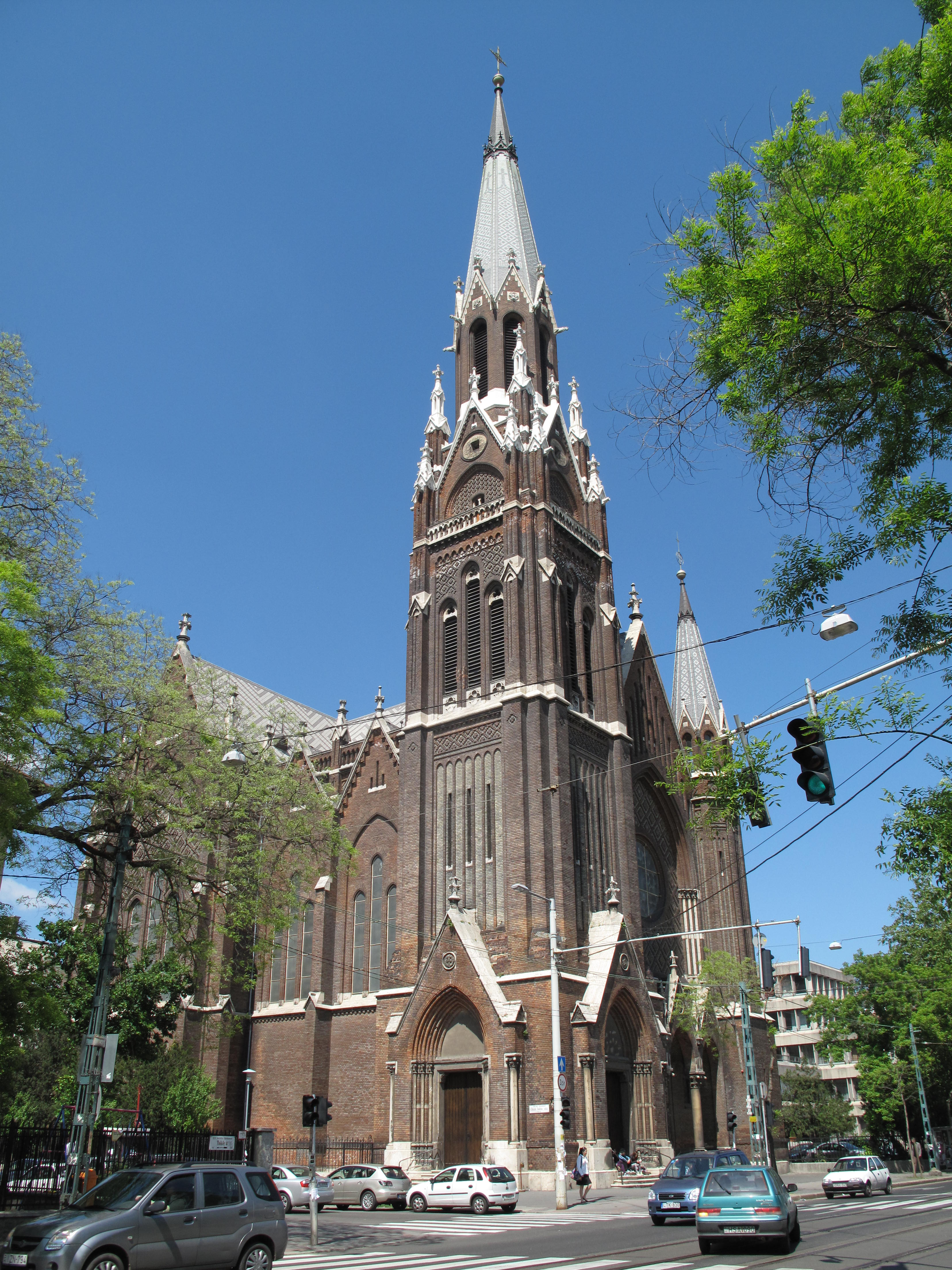

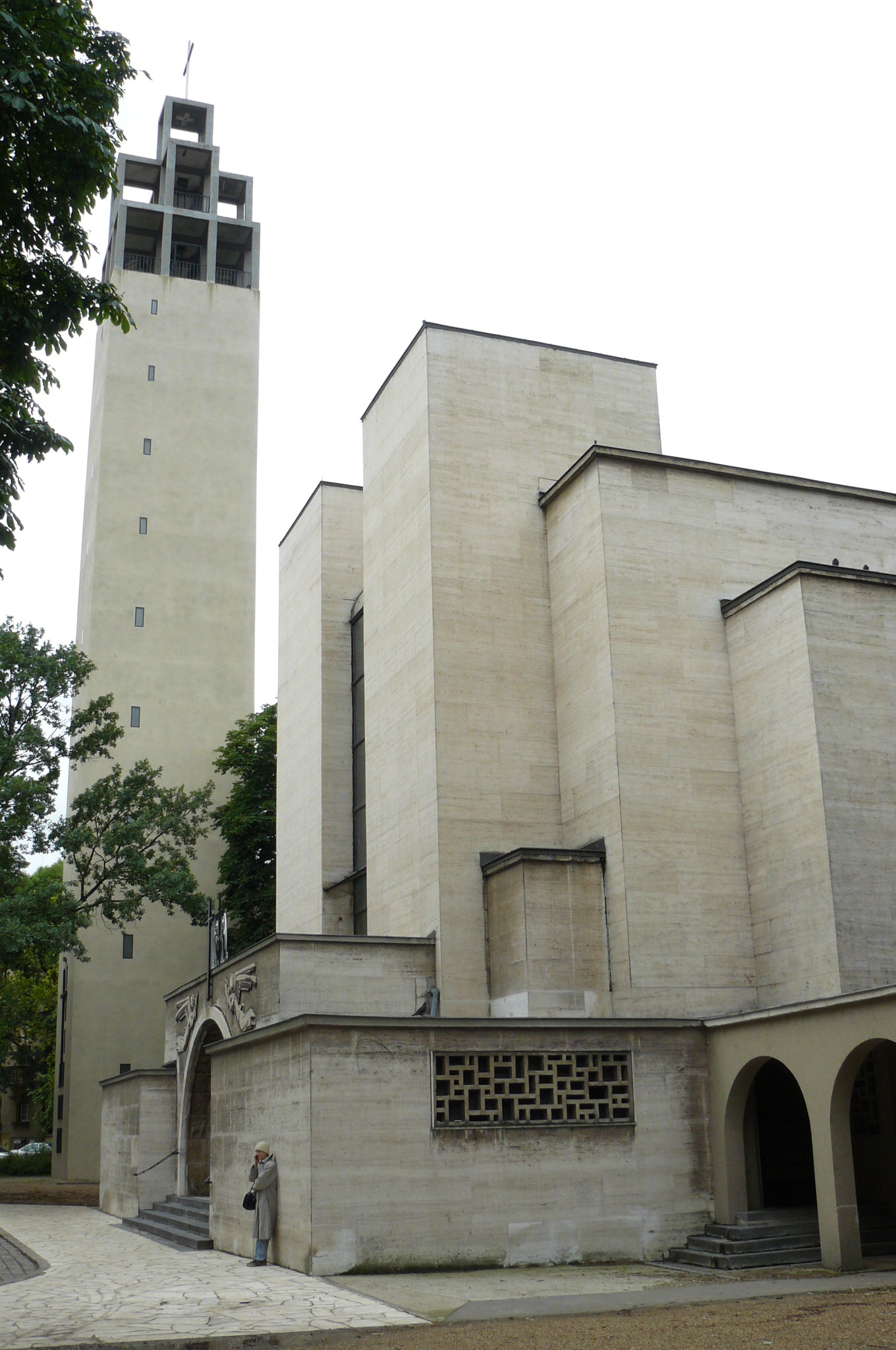

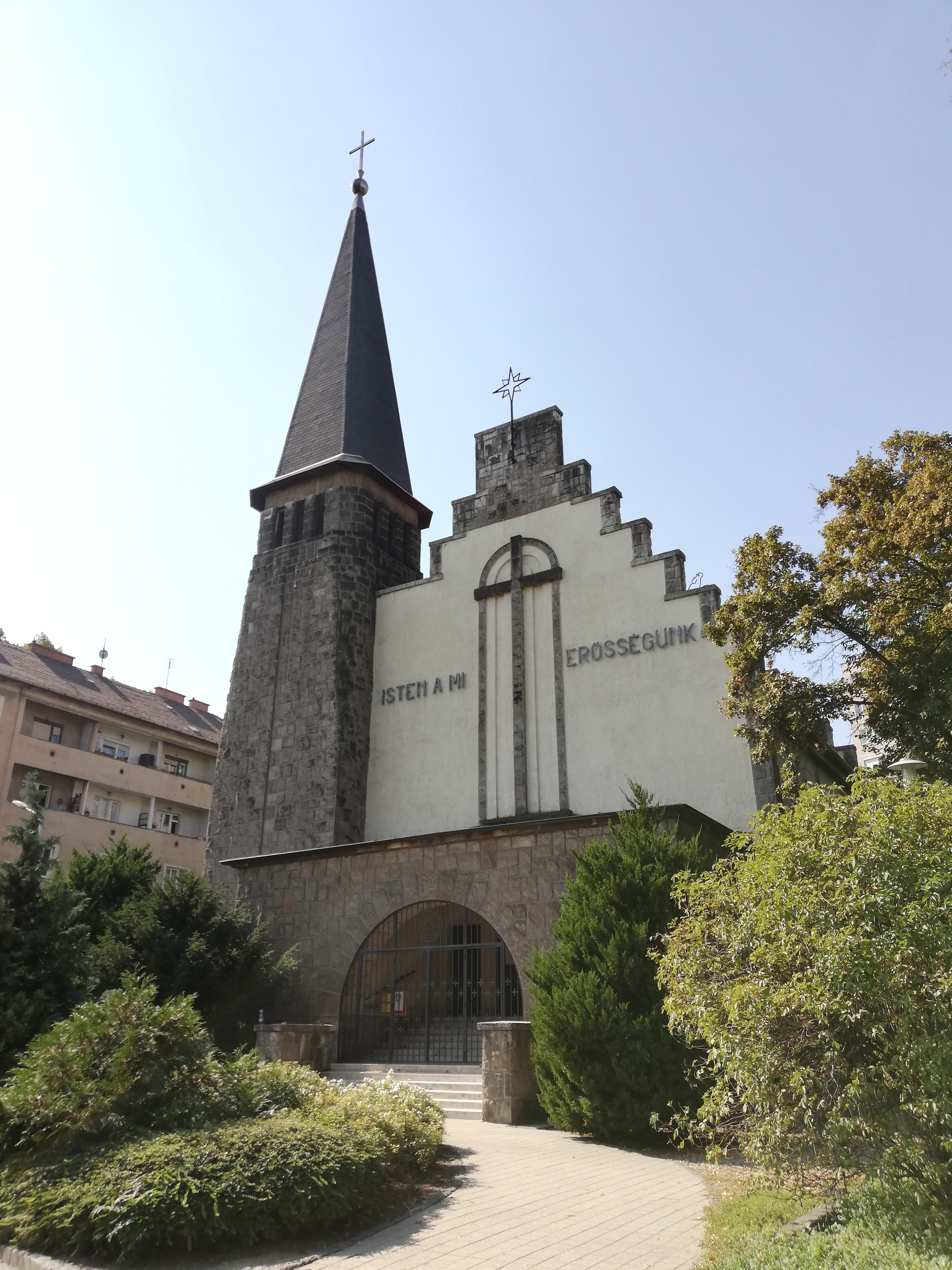

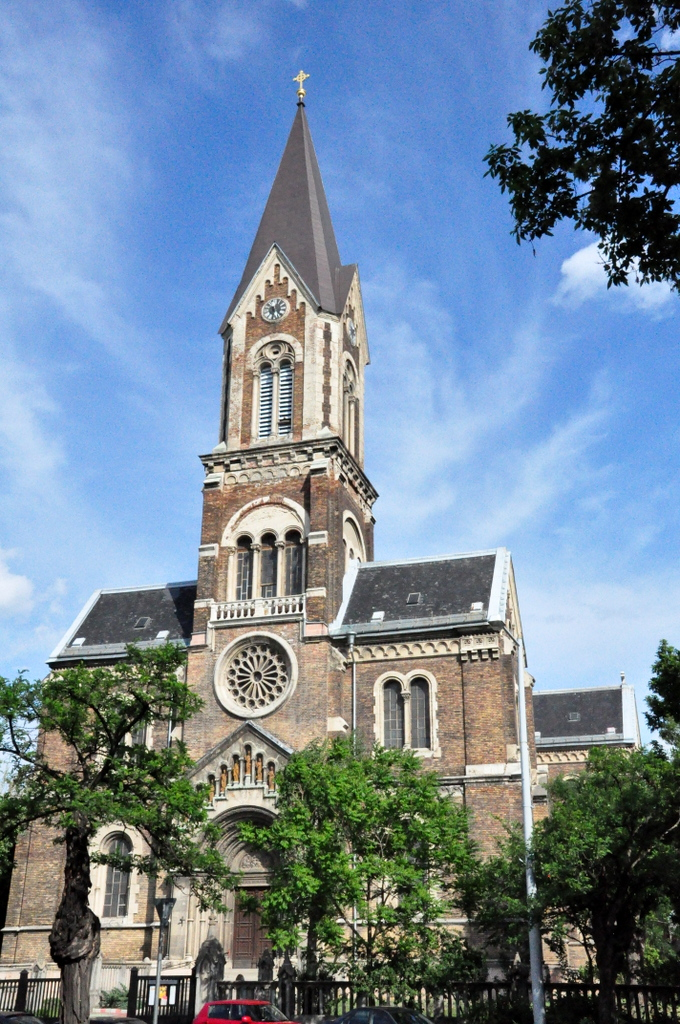

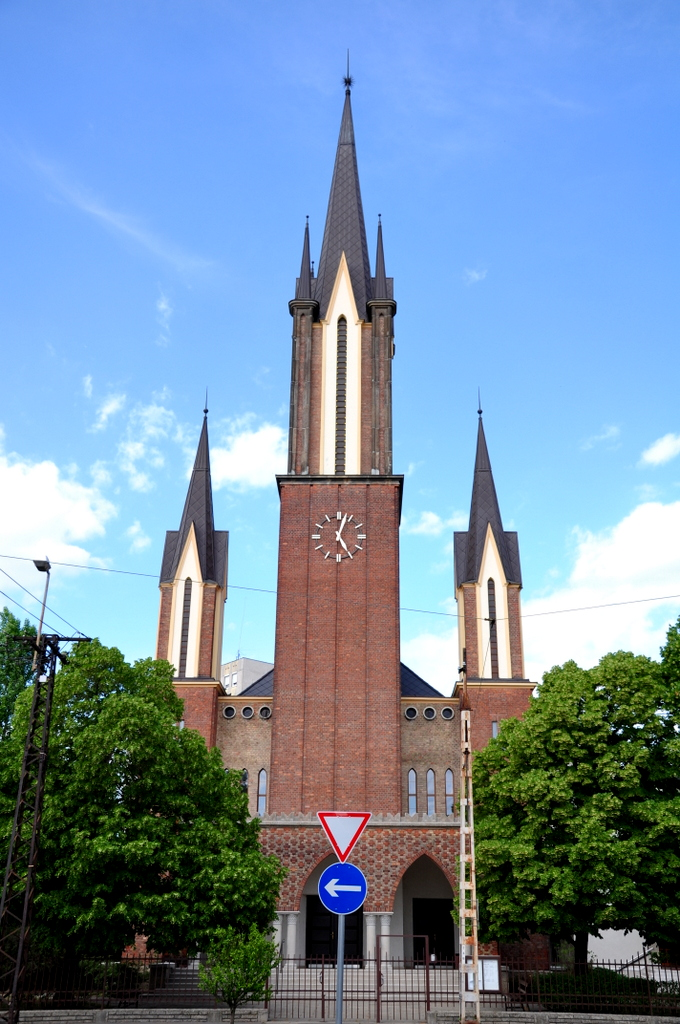

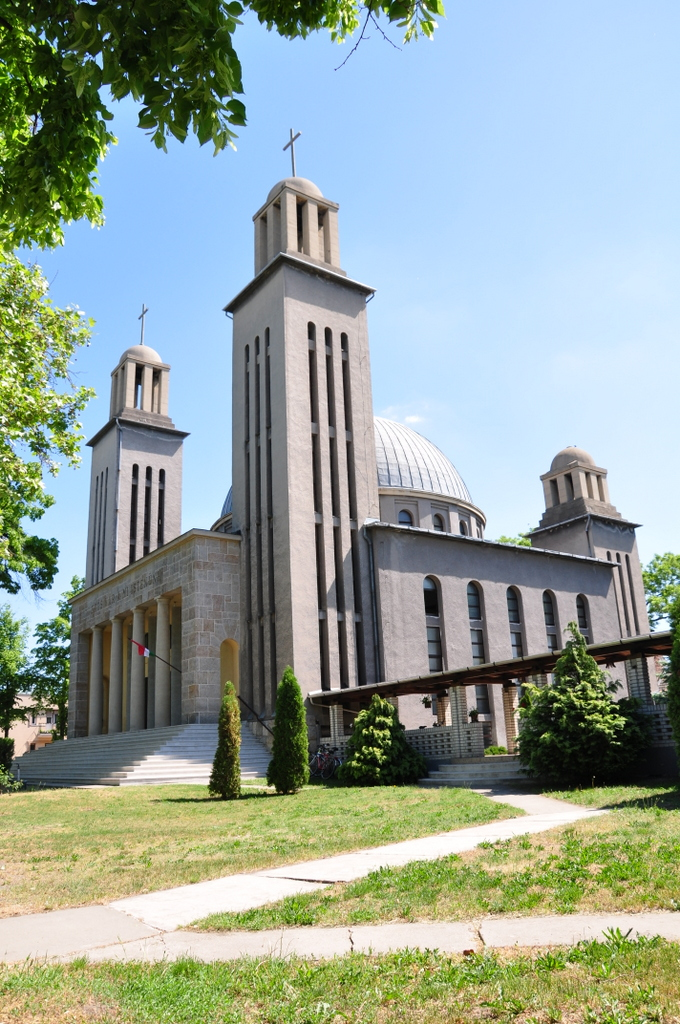

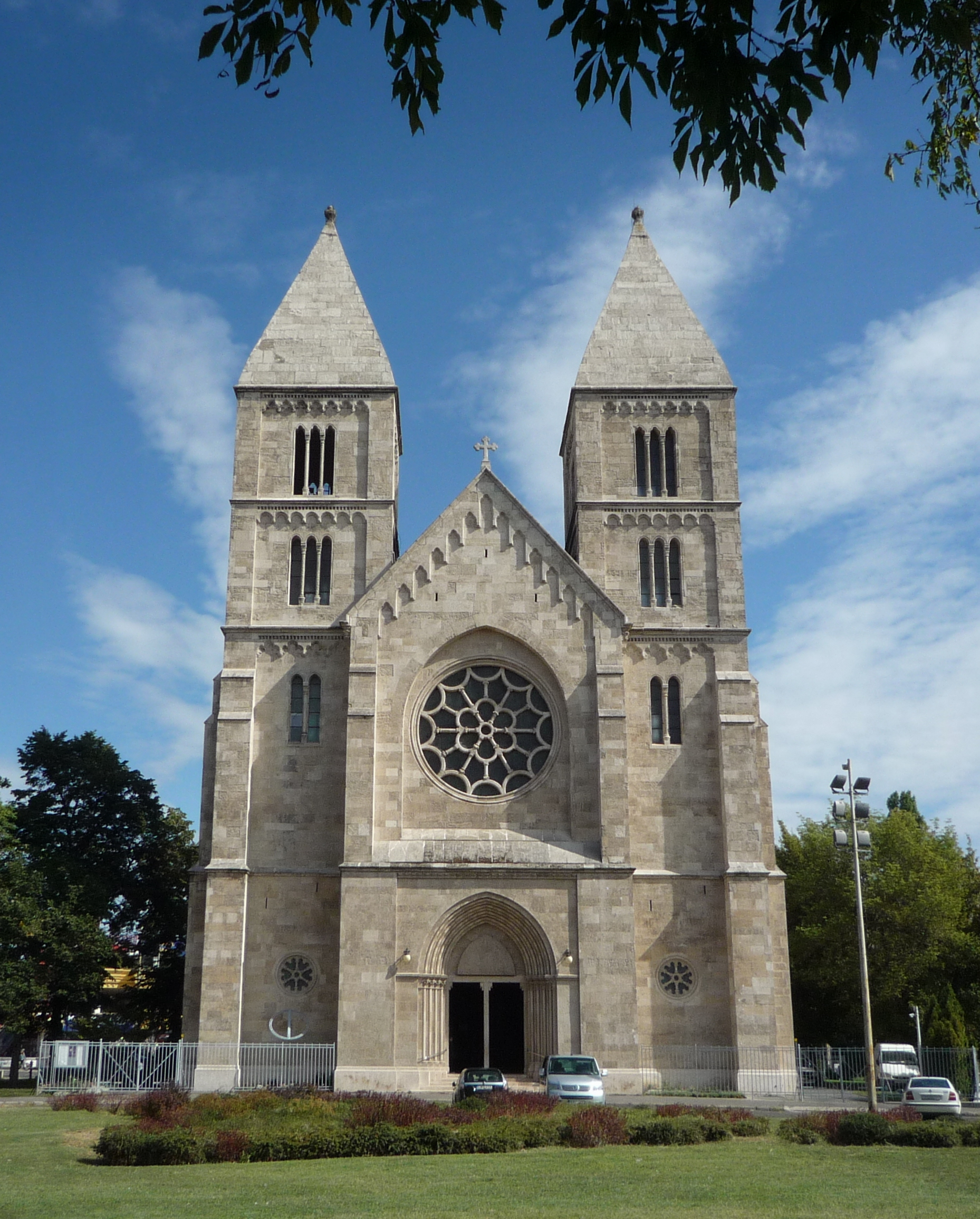

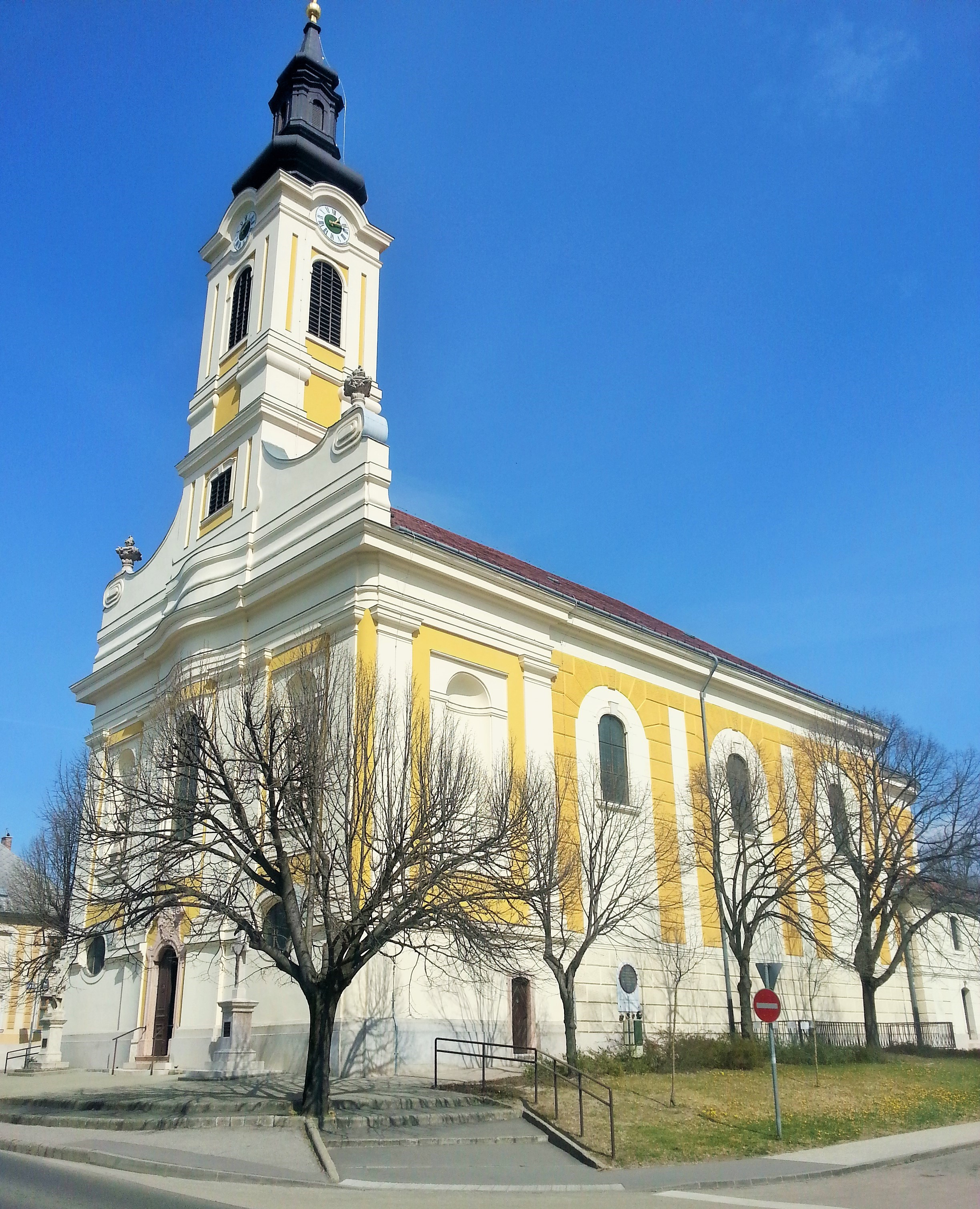

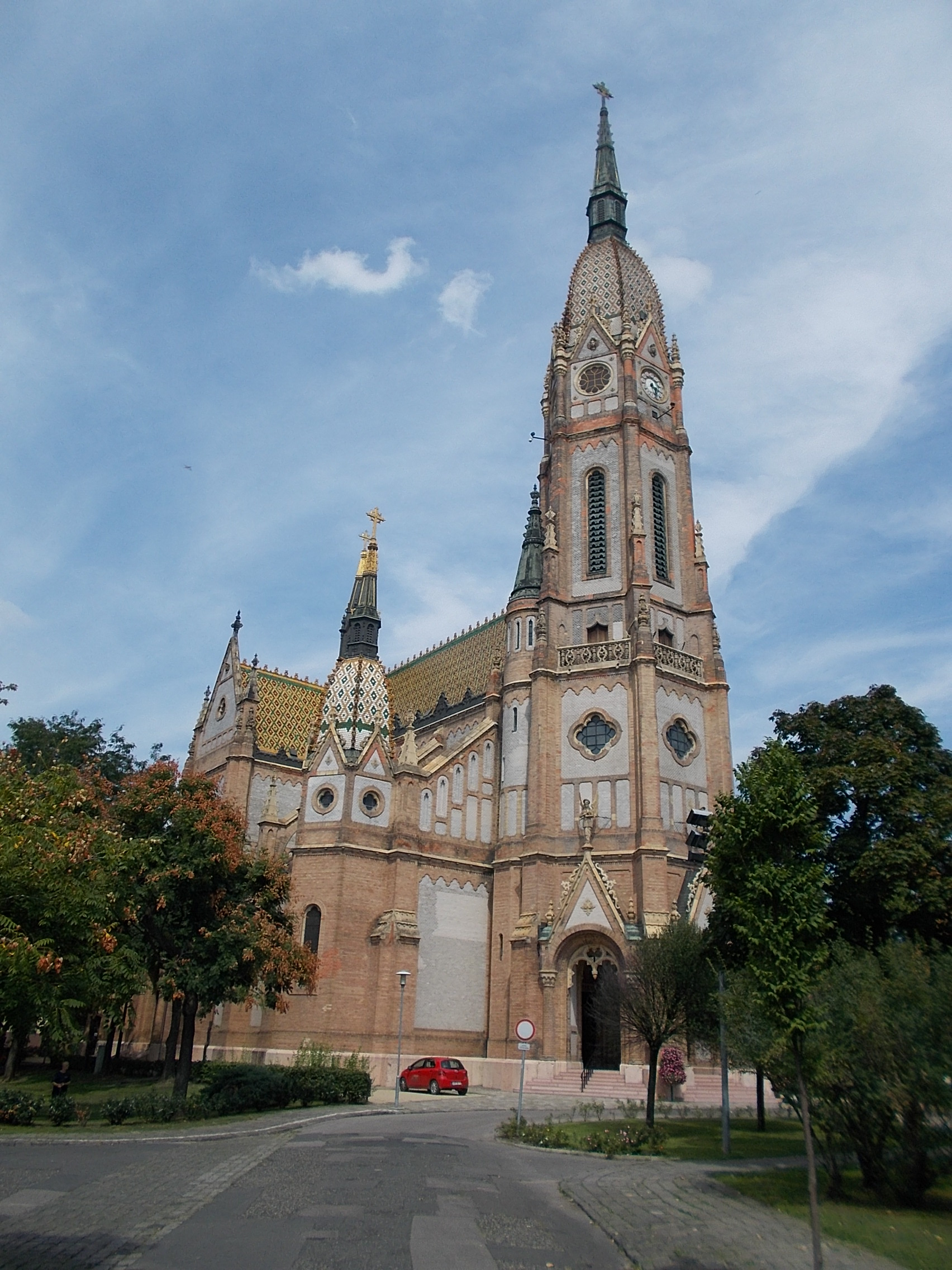

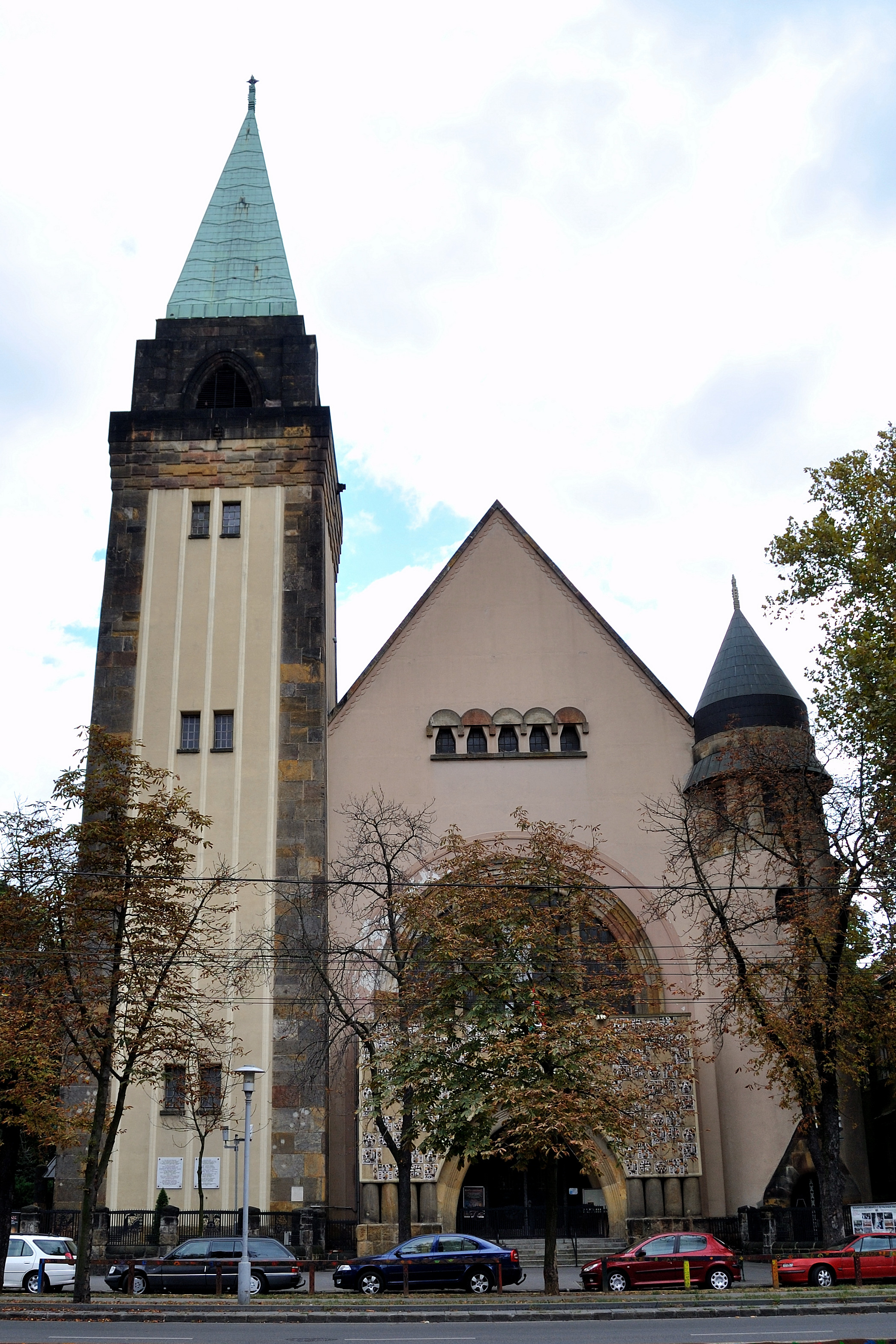

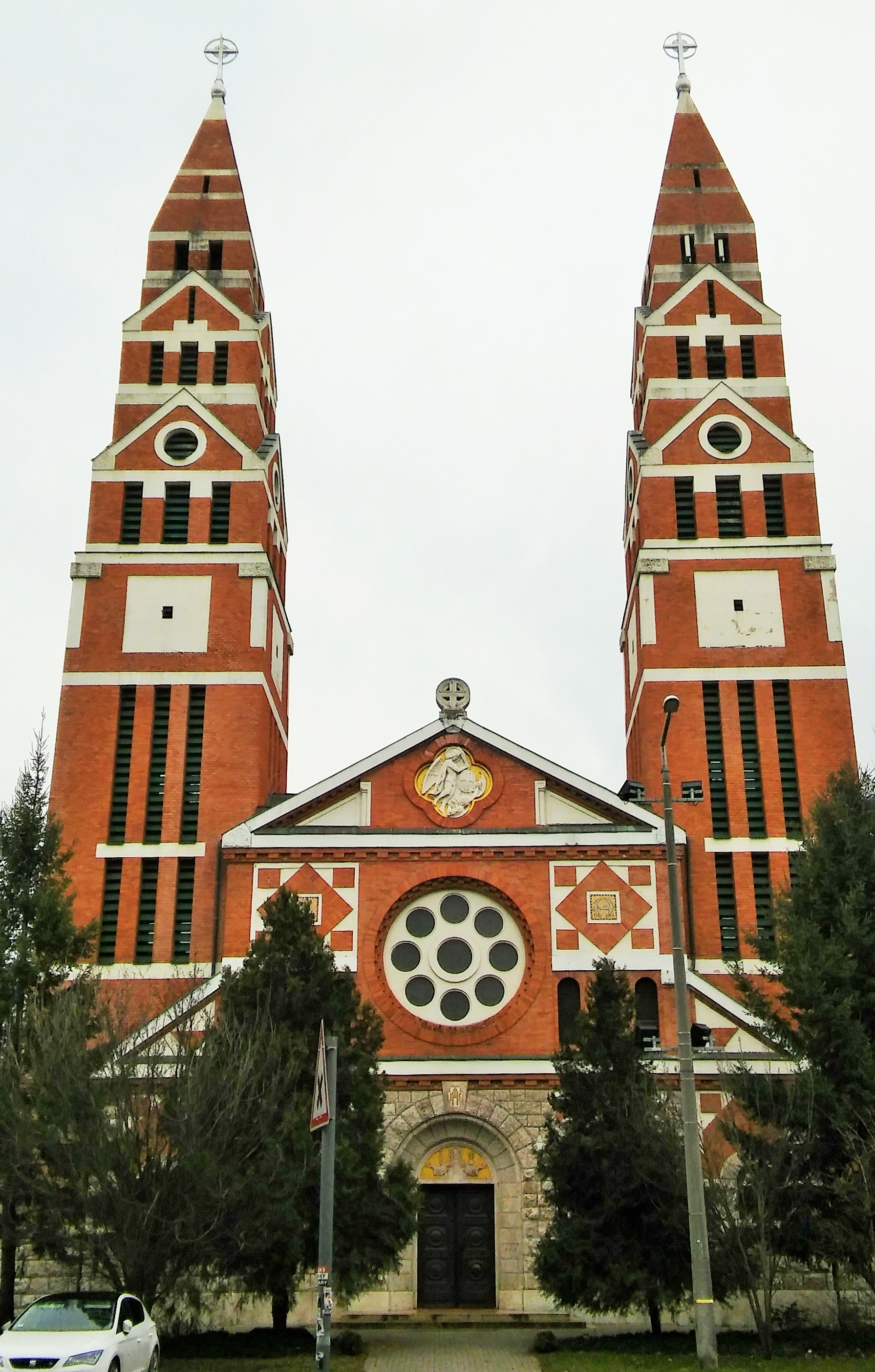

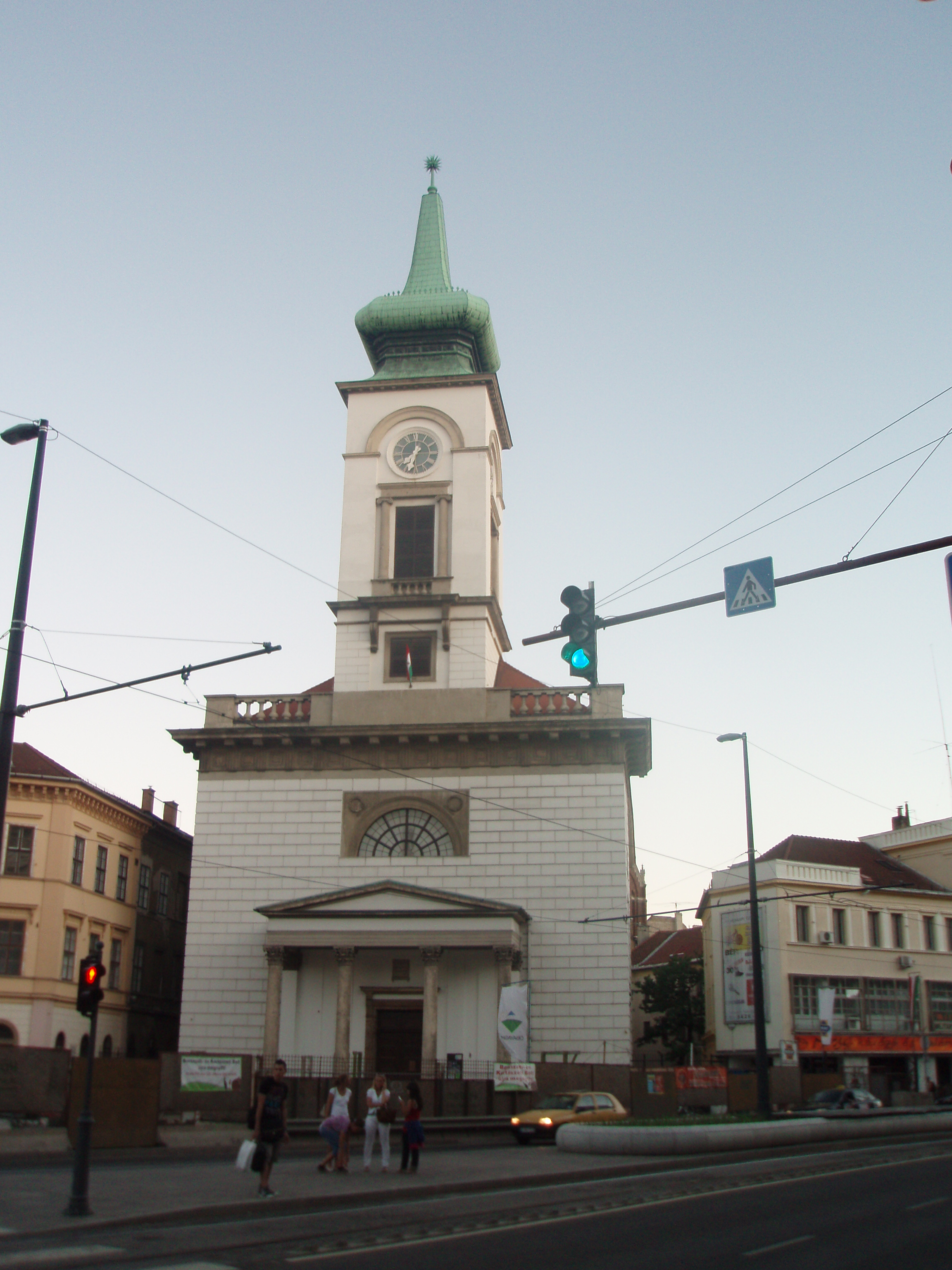

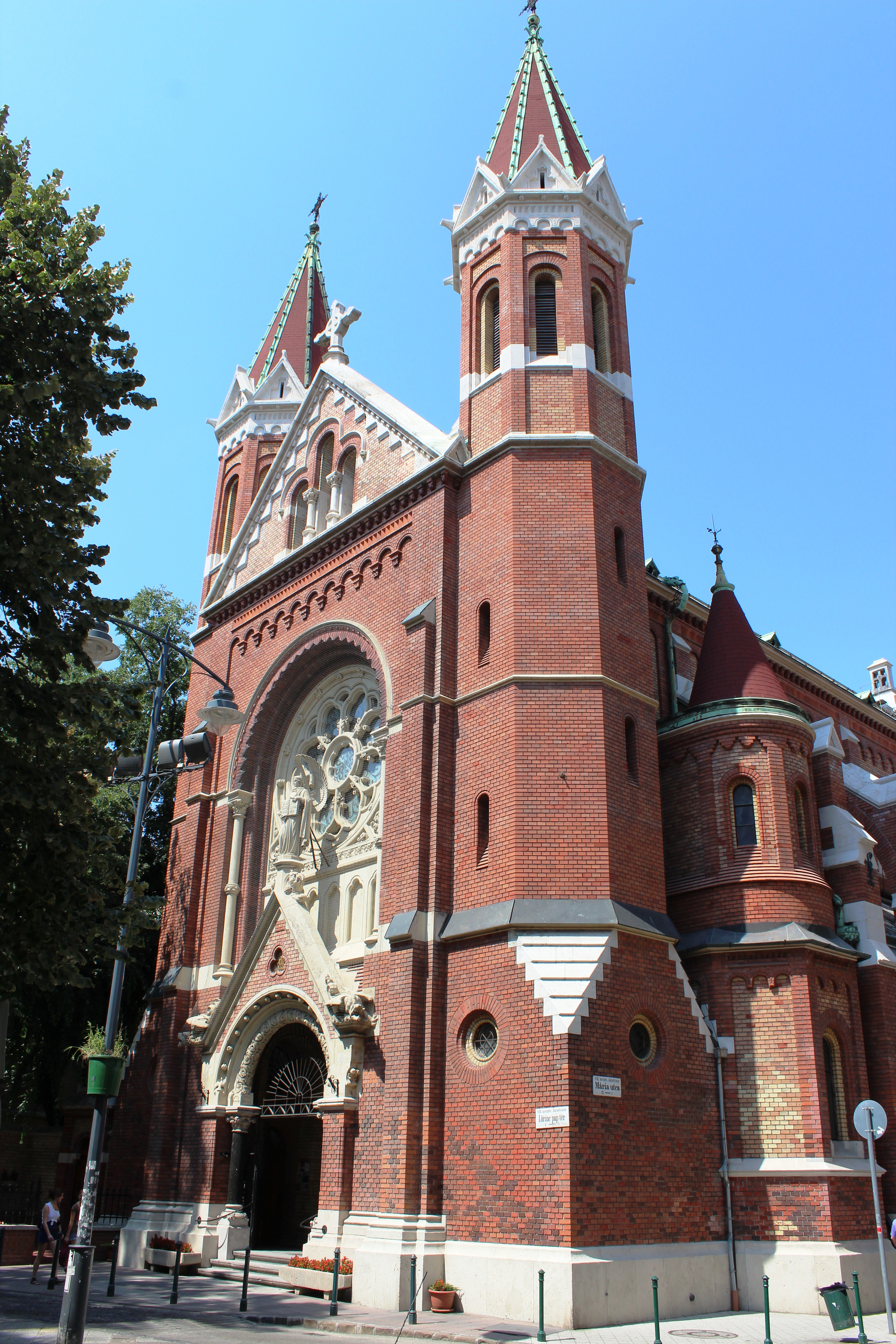

Photo of some churches in Budapest

== District I ==
=== Roman Catholic churches ===
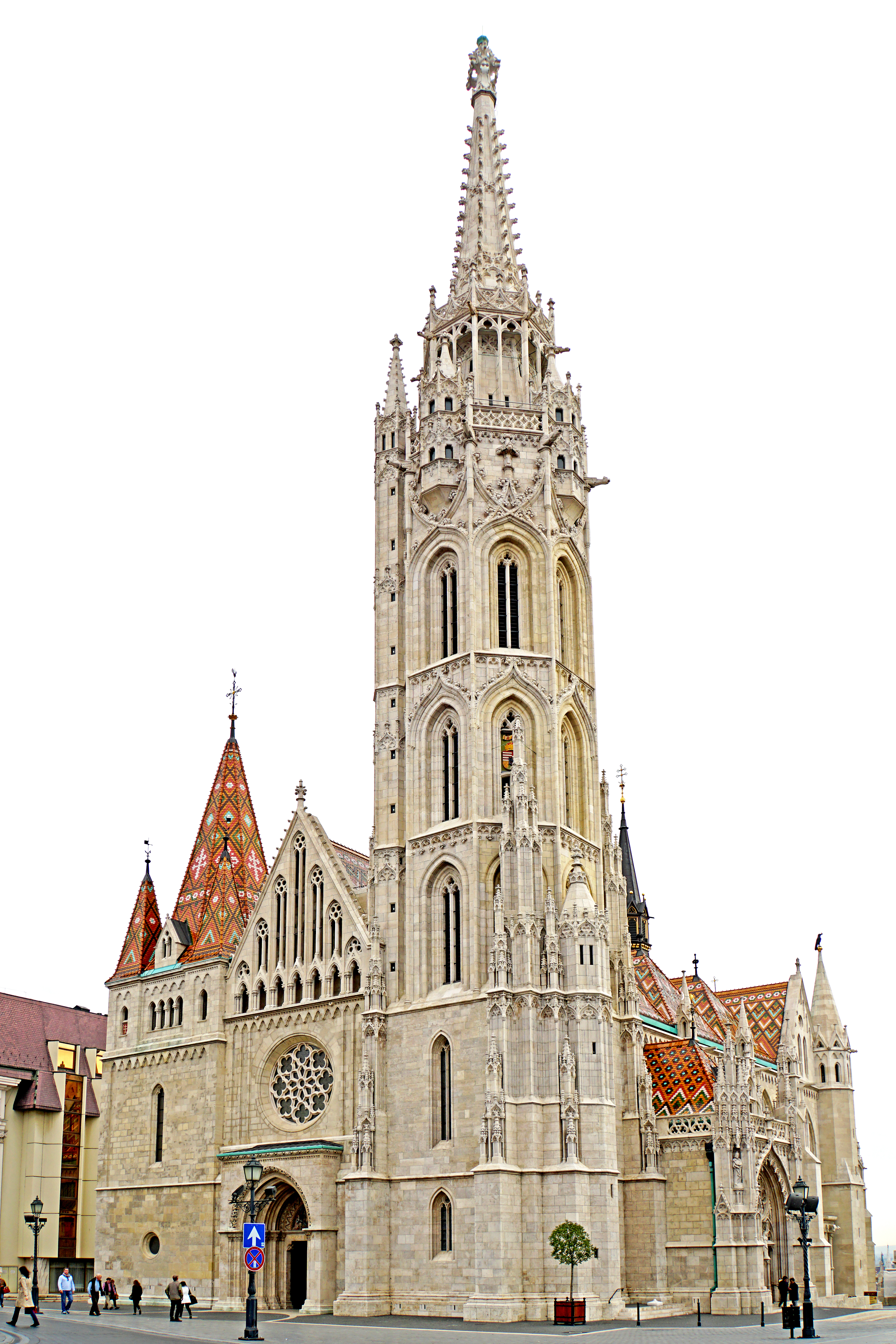
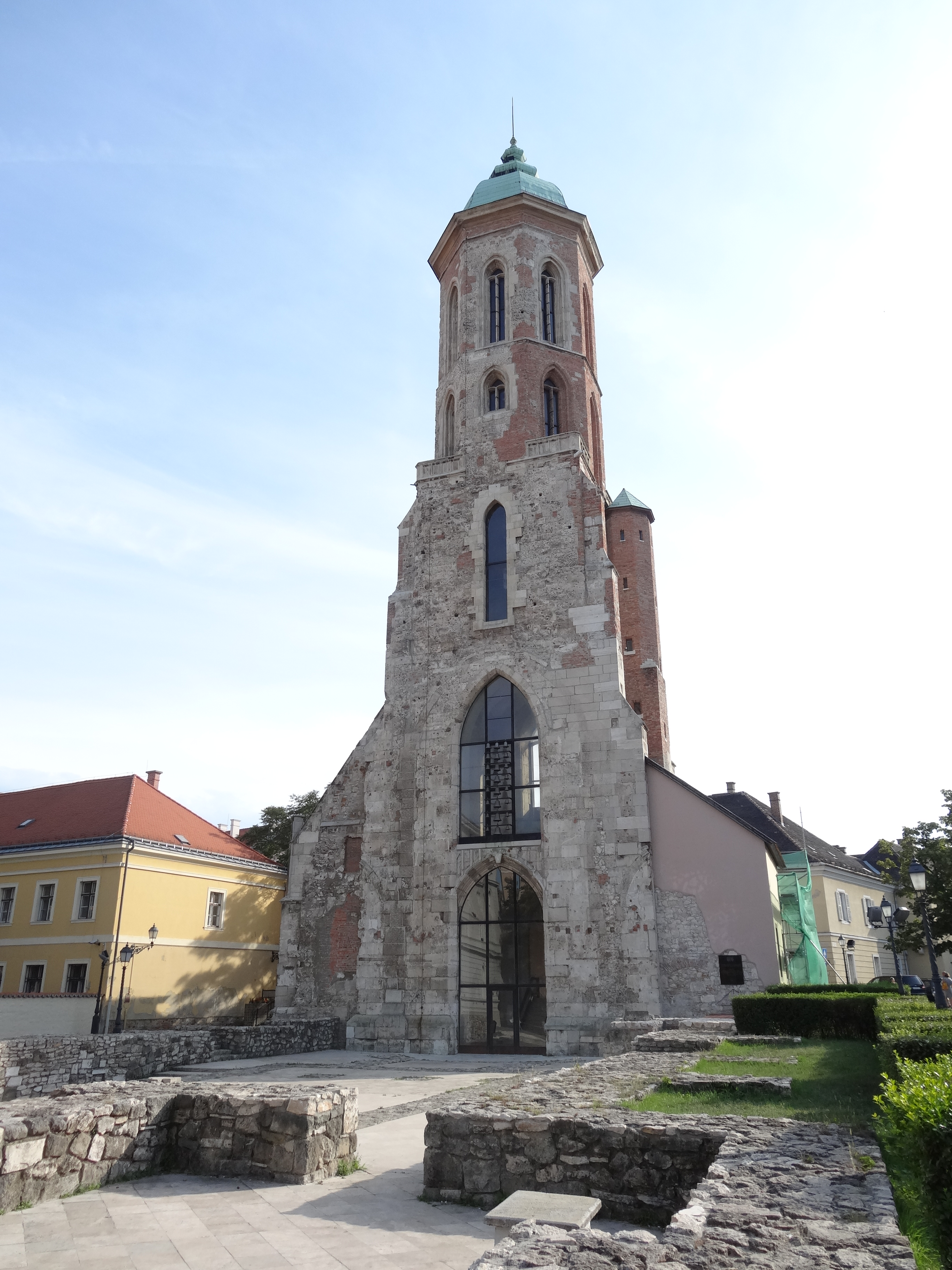
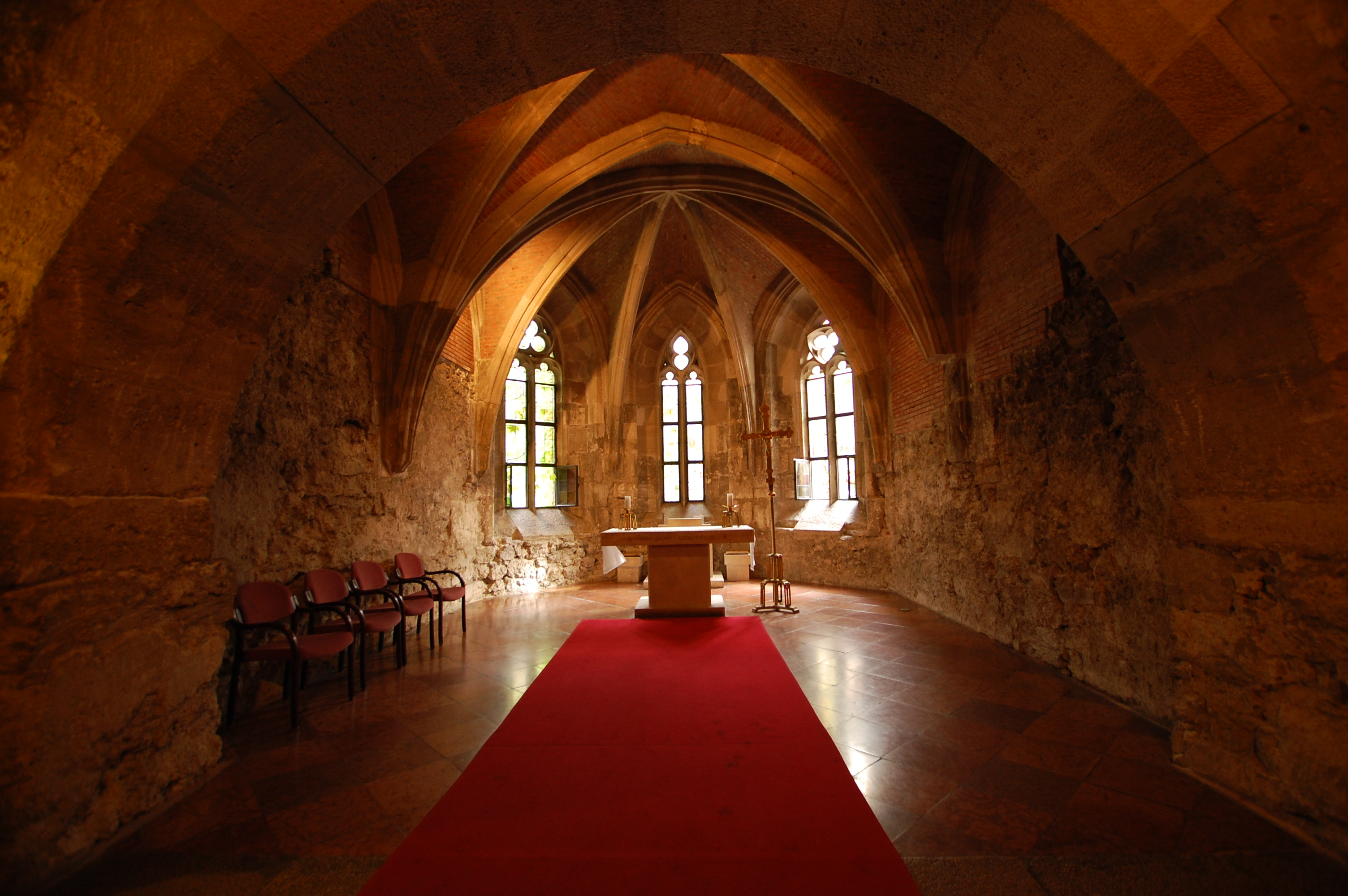
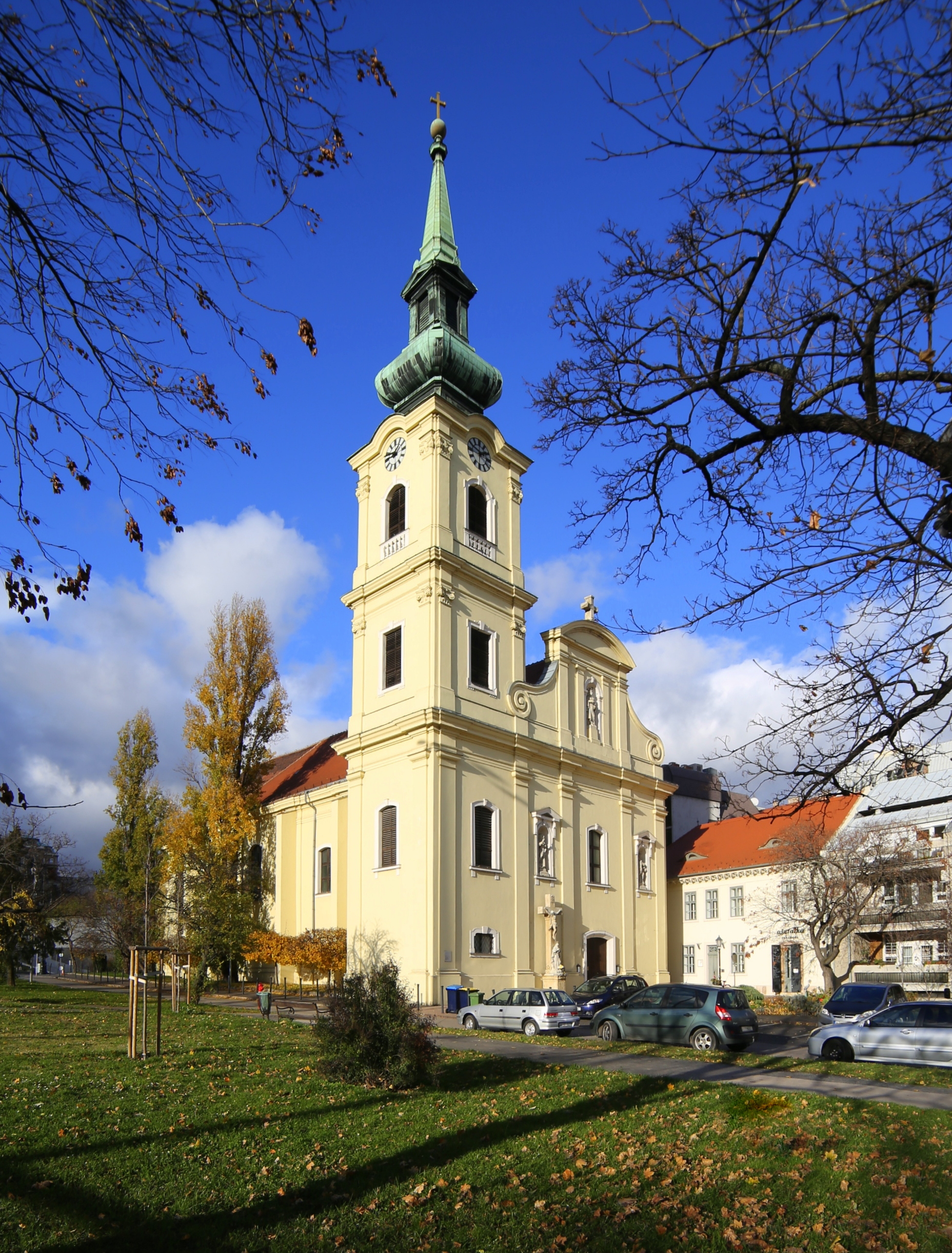
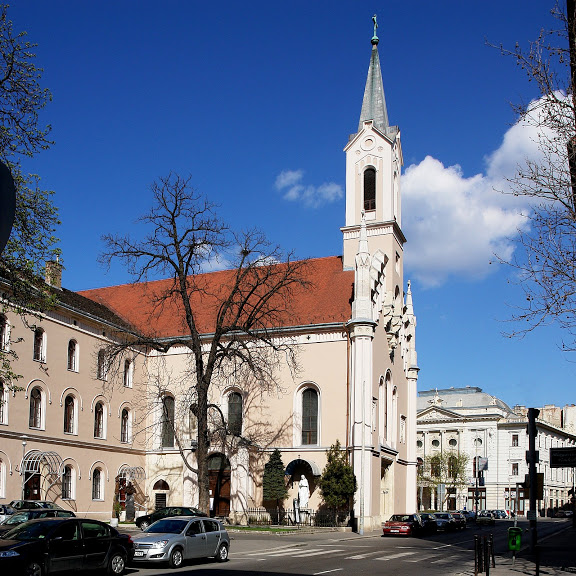
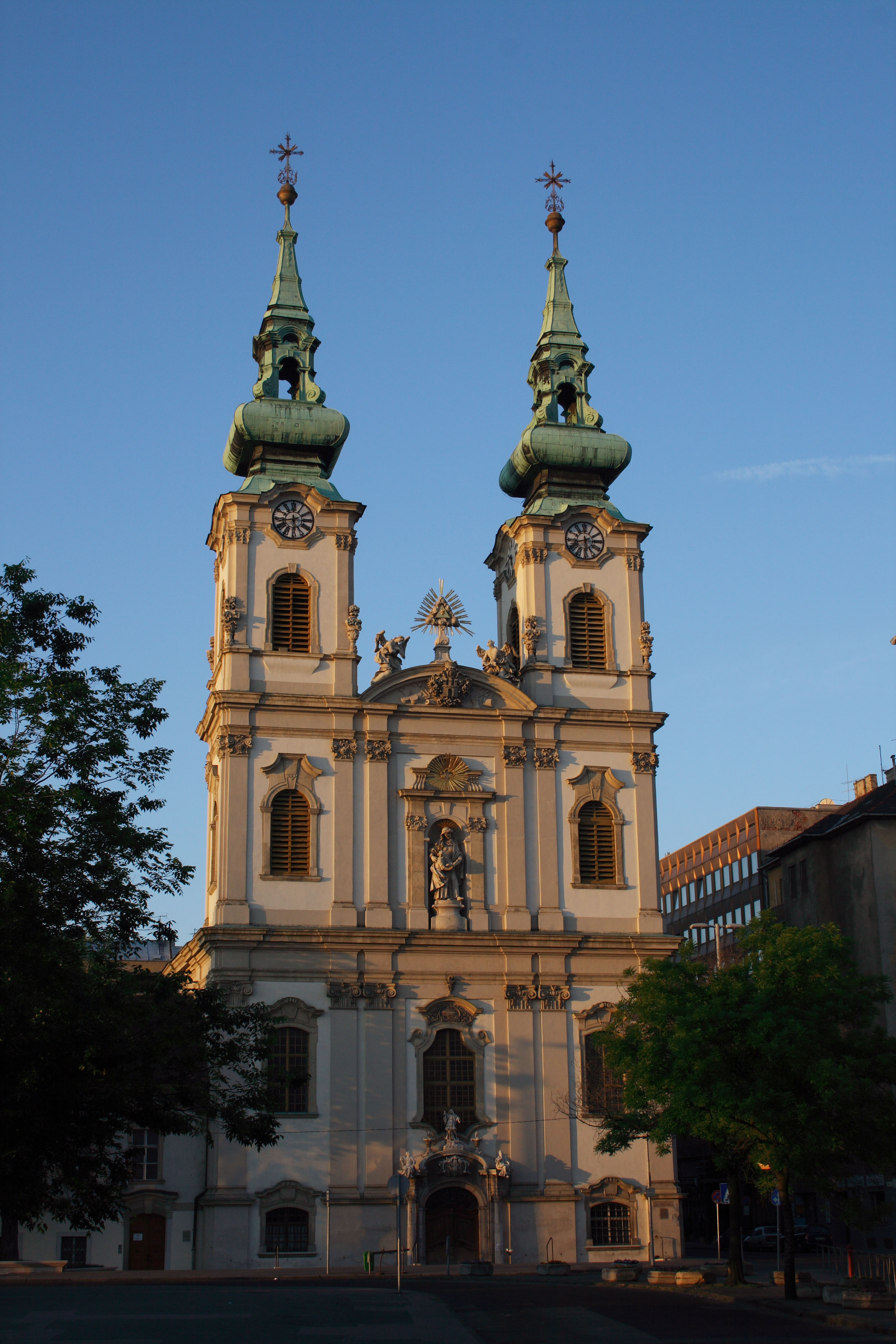
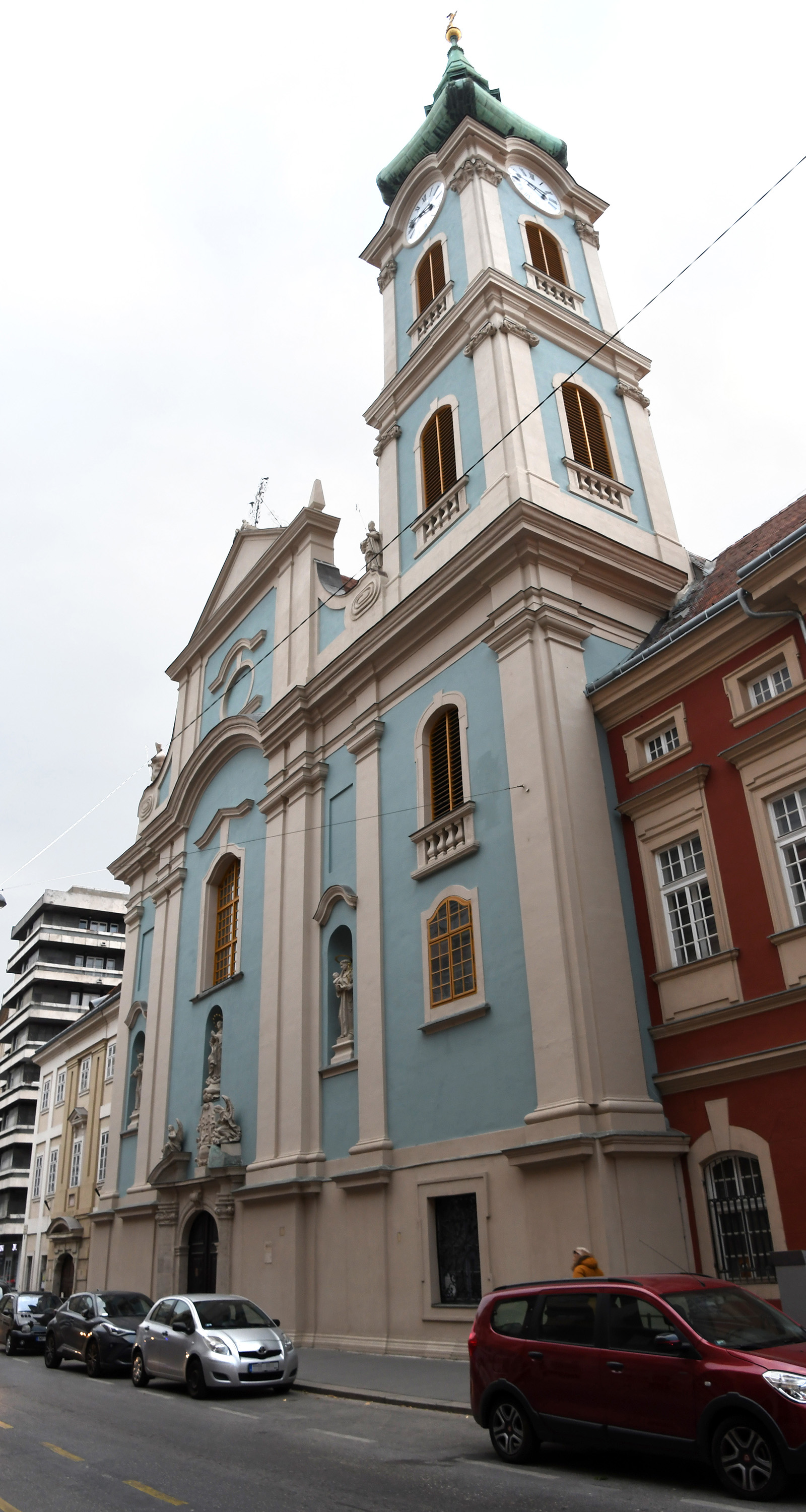
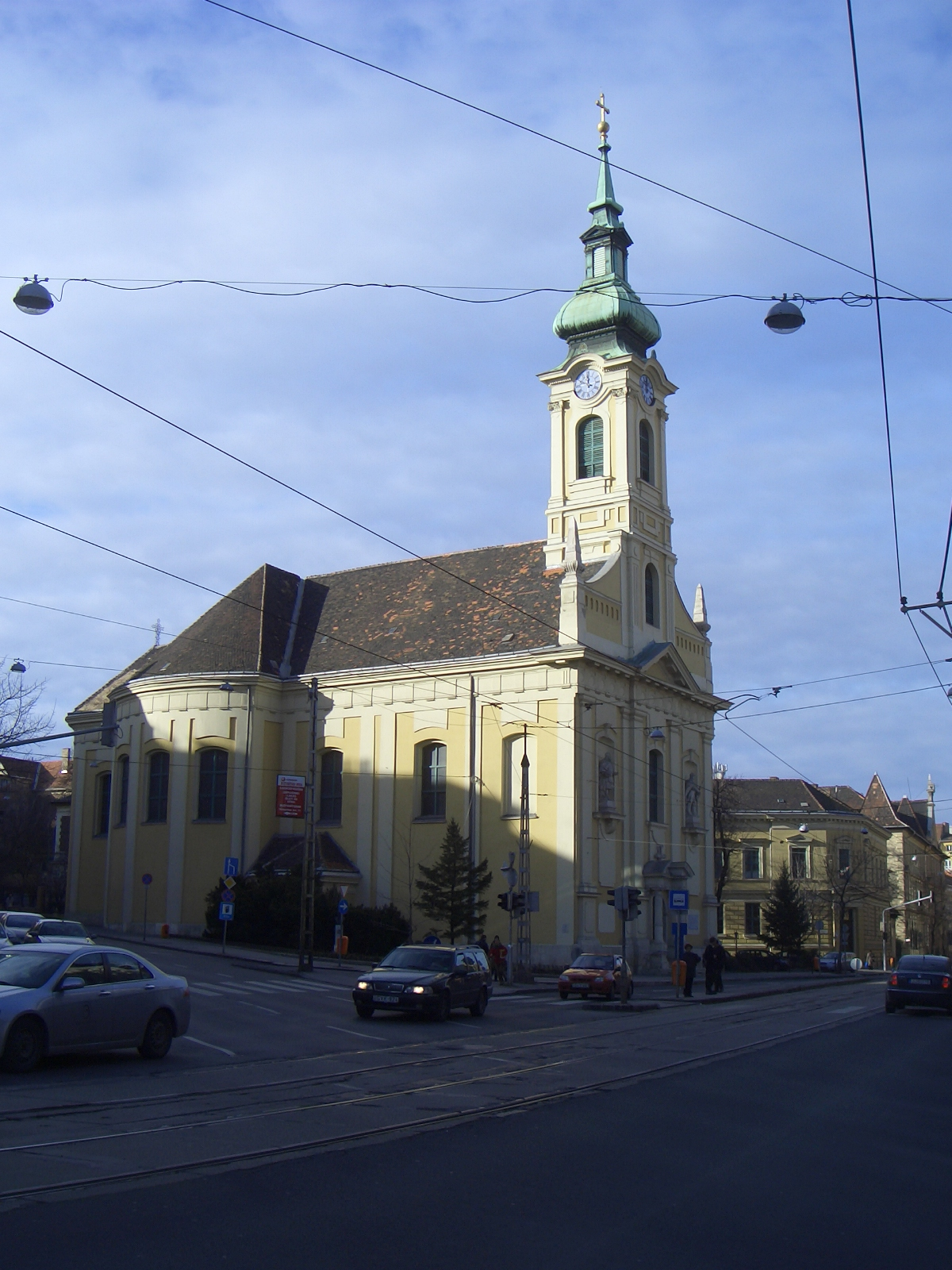
| Picture | Name | Construction time | Architectural style | Designer | Address, comments |
|---|---|---|---|---|---|
| | Matthias Church (Mátyás-templom) | 1246 | gothic | n. a. | 1014 Budapest, Szentháromság tér 2. |
| | Church of Mary Magdalene (Mária Magdolna-templom) | 13th century | gothic | n. a. | 1014 Budapest, Kapisztrán tér 6. It was demolished in the 1950s, leaving only its tower. |
| | Szent István Király minden Magyarok Kápolnája (Budavári Várkápolna) | 15th century | gothic | n. a. | 1014 Budapest, Szent György tér 2. It has been part of the Budapest History Museum since 1963. |
| | Tabáni Alexandriai Szent Katalin-templom | 1566 | baroque | n. a. | 1013 Budapest, Attila út 11. It was originally a mosque. |
| | Árpád-házi Szent Erzsébet-plébániatemplom (Budai kapucinus templom) | 1697–1716 | baroque | n. a. | 1011 Budapest, Fő utca 32. It was converted into the Romanesque style in the 1850s. |
| | Felsővízivárosi Szent Anna-plébániatemplom | 1740–1761 | baroque | Hamon Kristóf, Nöpauer Máté | 1011 Budapest, Batthyány tér 7. |
| | Szent Ferenc sebei templom | 1741 | baroque | n. a. | 1011 Budapest, Fő utca 41–43. |
| | Krisztinavárosi Havas Boldogasszony Plébániatemplom | 1795 | copf | Hikisch Kristóf | 1016 Budapest, Mészáros u. 1. |

=== Reformed churches ===
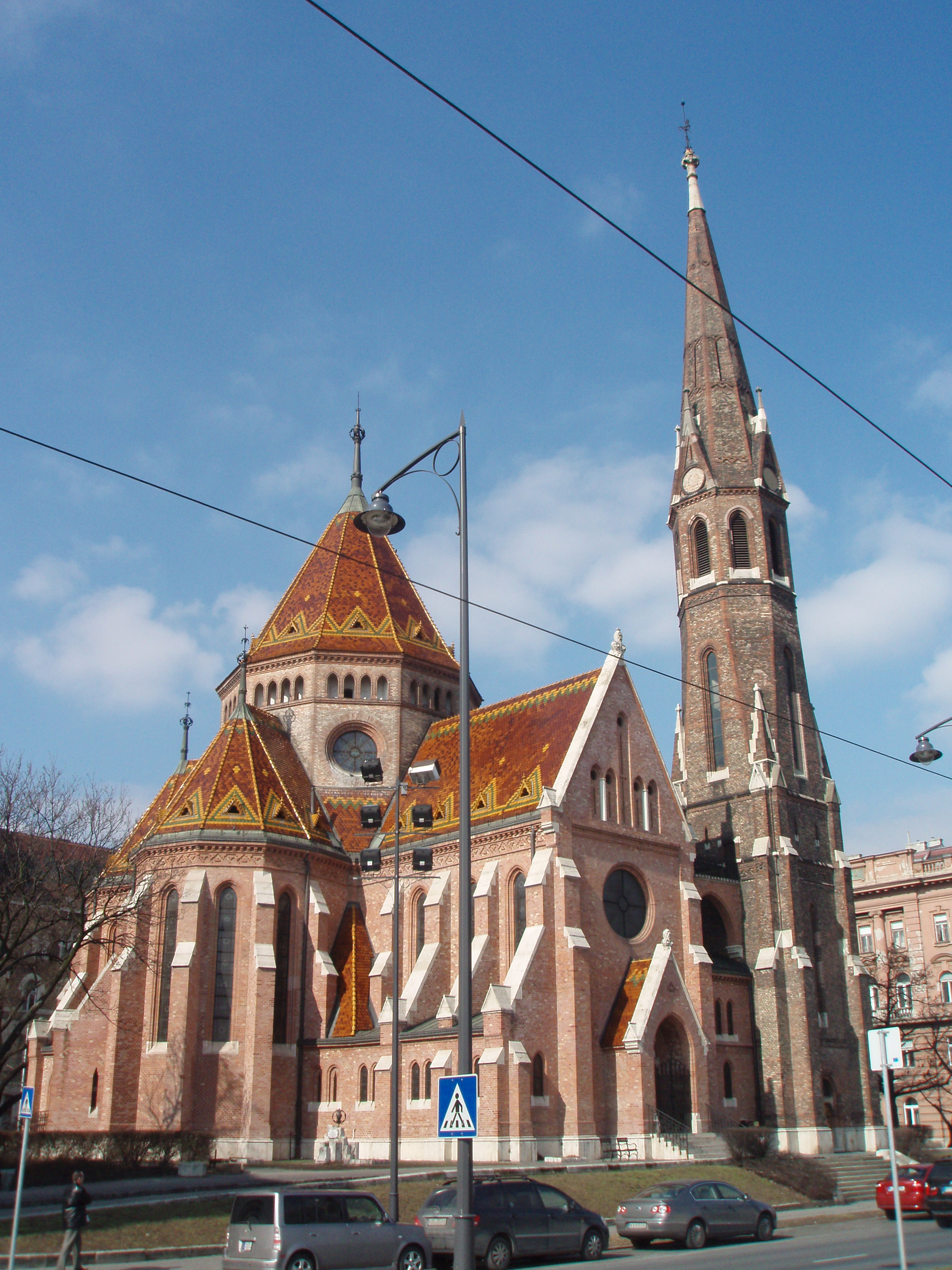
| Picture | Name | Construction time | Architectural style | Designer | Address, comments |
|---|---|---|---|---|---|
| | Szilágyi Dezső Square Reformed Church | 1893–1896 | neogothic | Samu Pecz | 1011 Budapest, Szilágyi Dezső tér 3. |

=== Evangelical churches ===
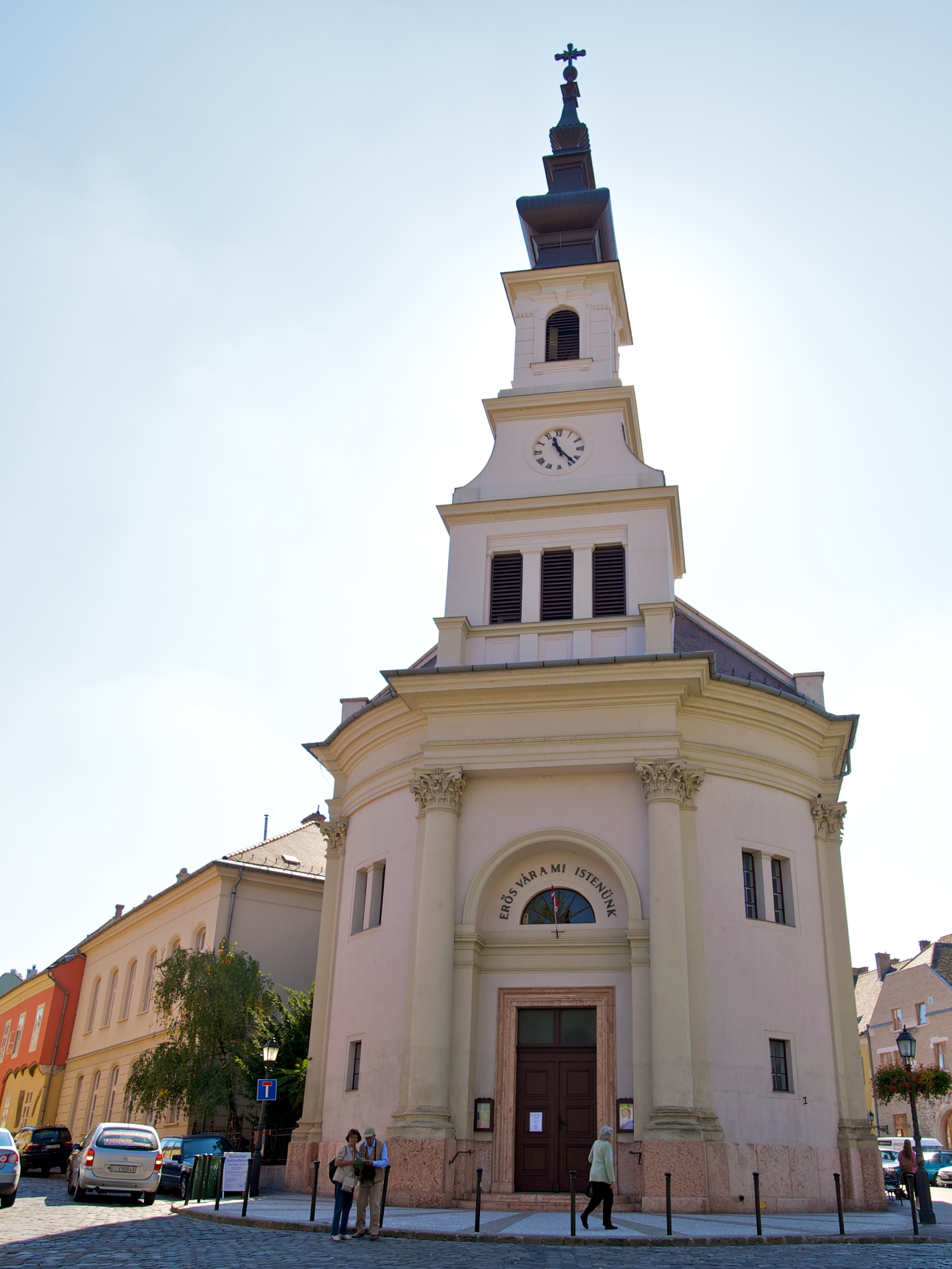
| Picture | Name | Construction time | Architectural style | Designer | Address, comments |
|---|---|---|---|---|---|
| | Lutheran Church of Budavár (Budavári evangélikus templom) | 1895 | eclectic-neobaroque | Kallina Mór | 1014 Budapest, Táncsics Mihály u. 28. |

== District II ==
=== Roman Catholic churches ===
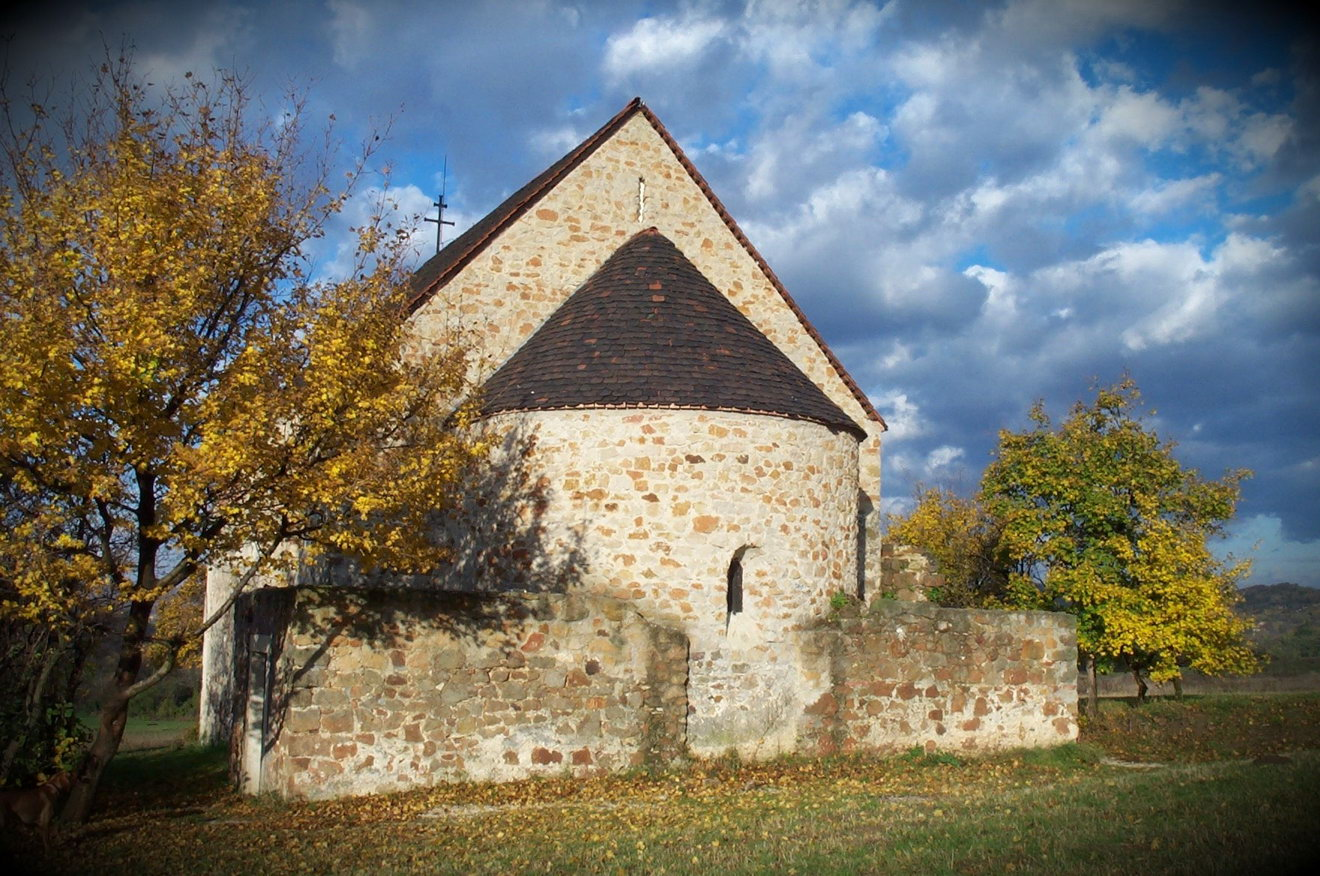
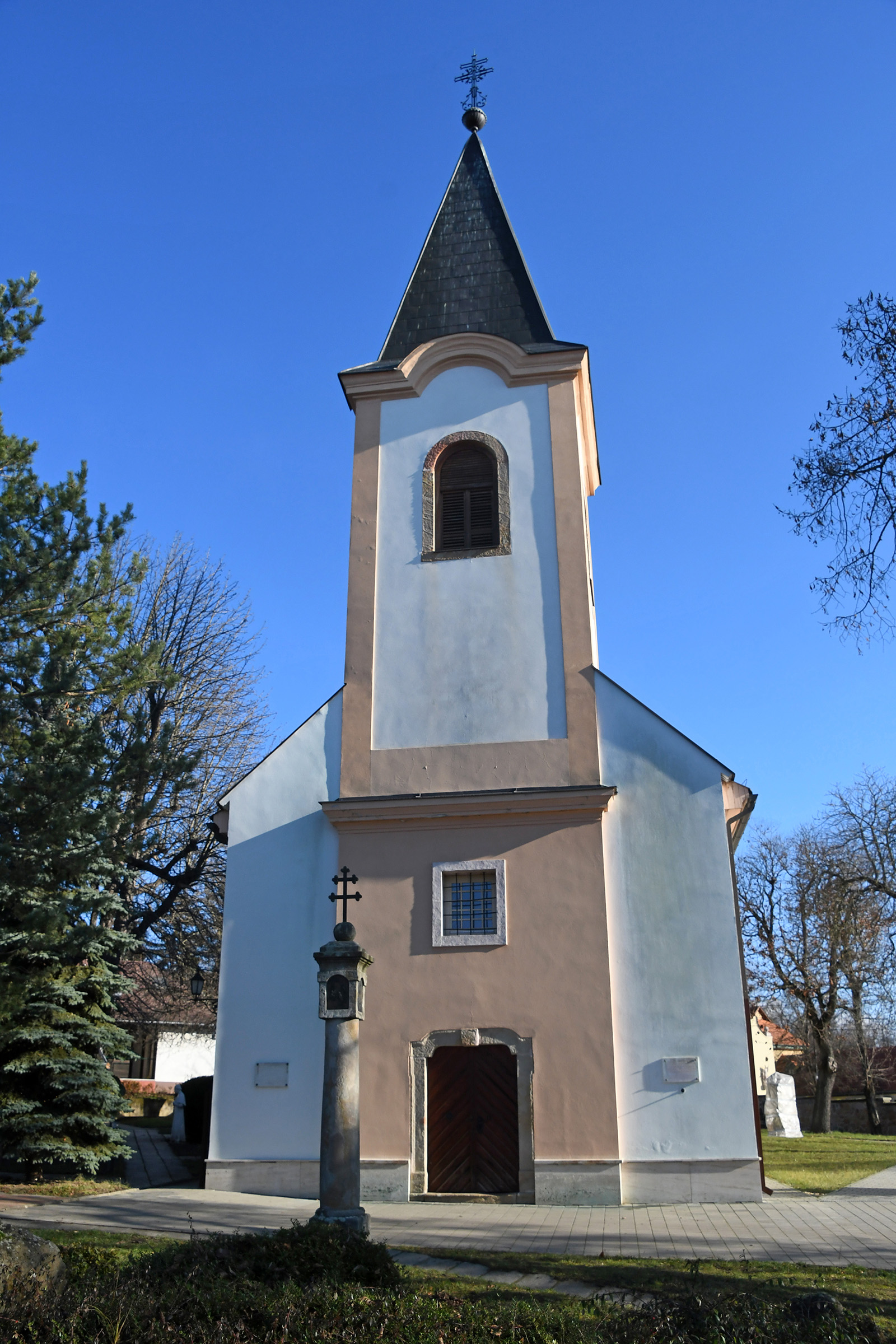
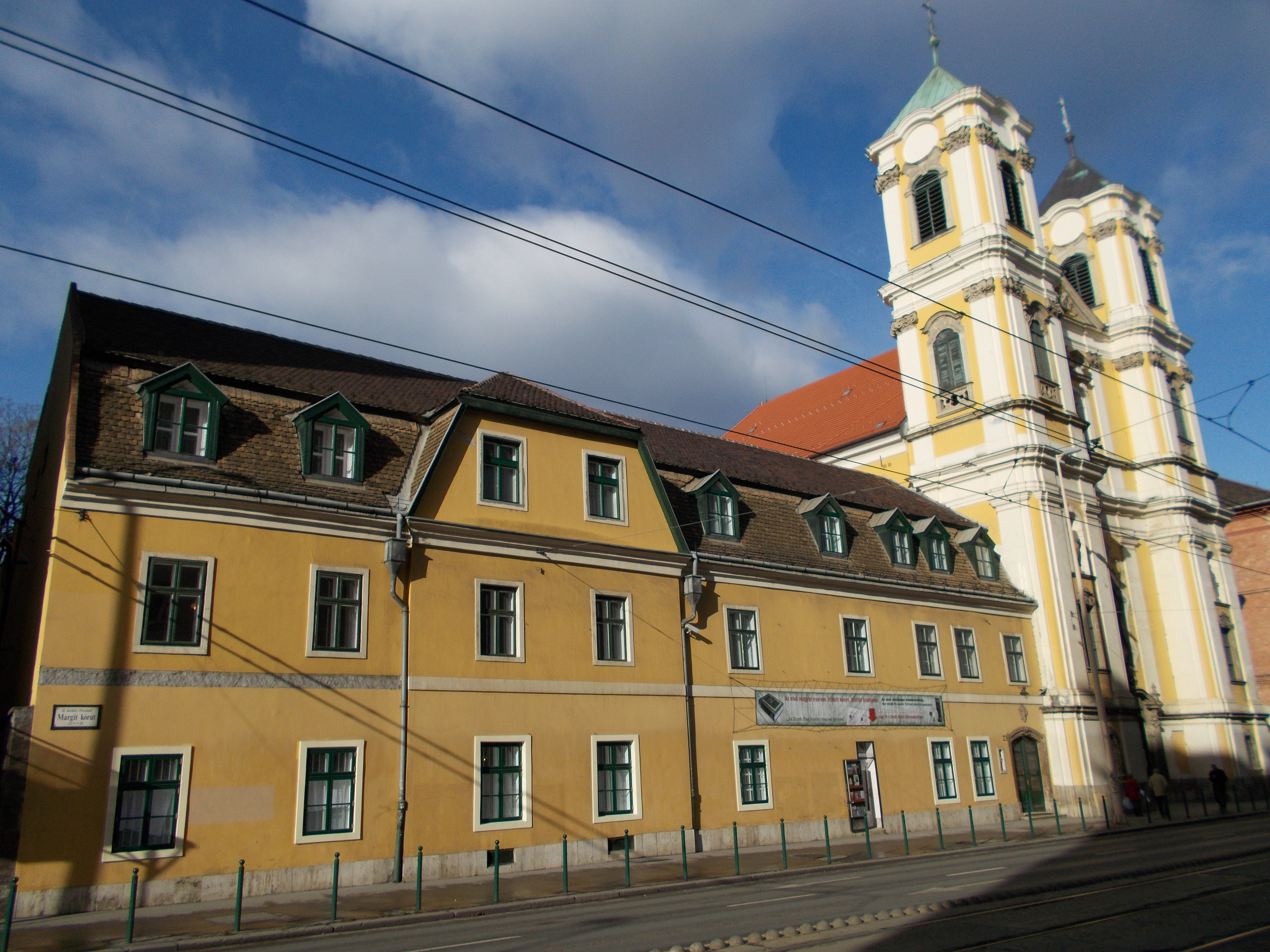
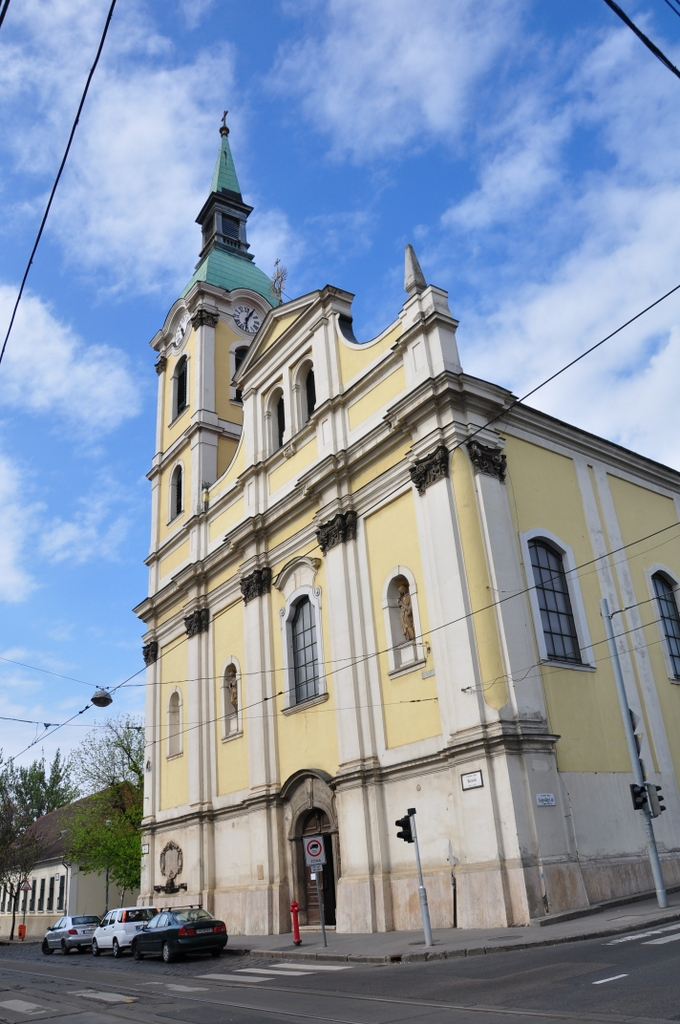
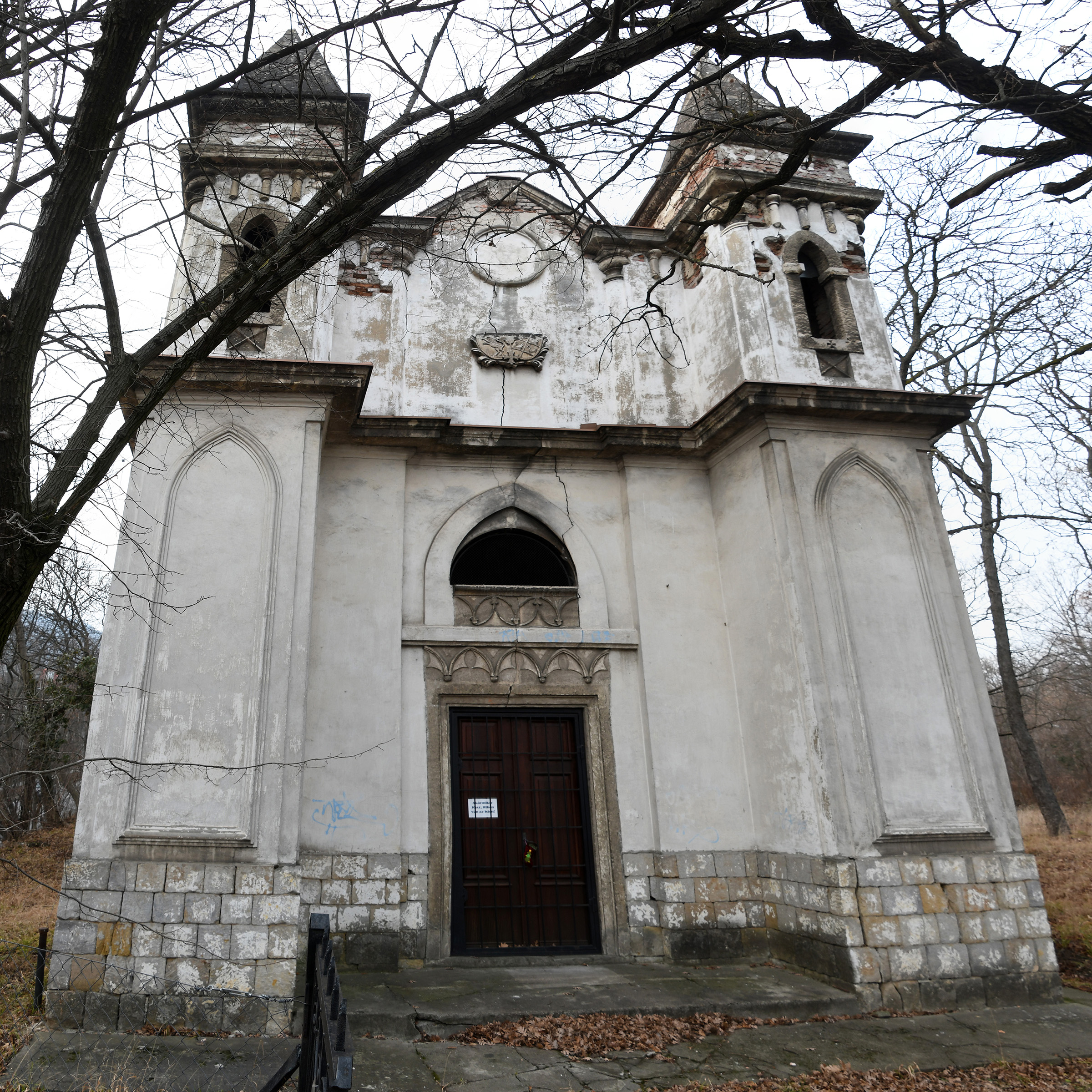
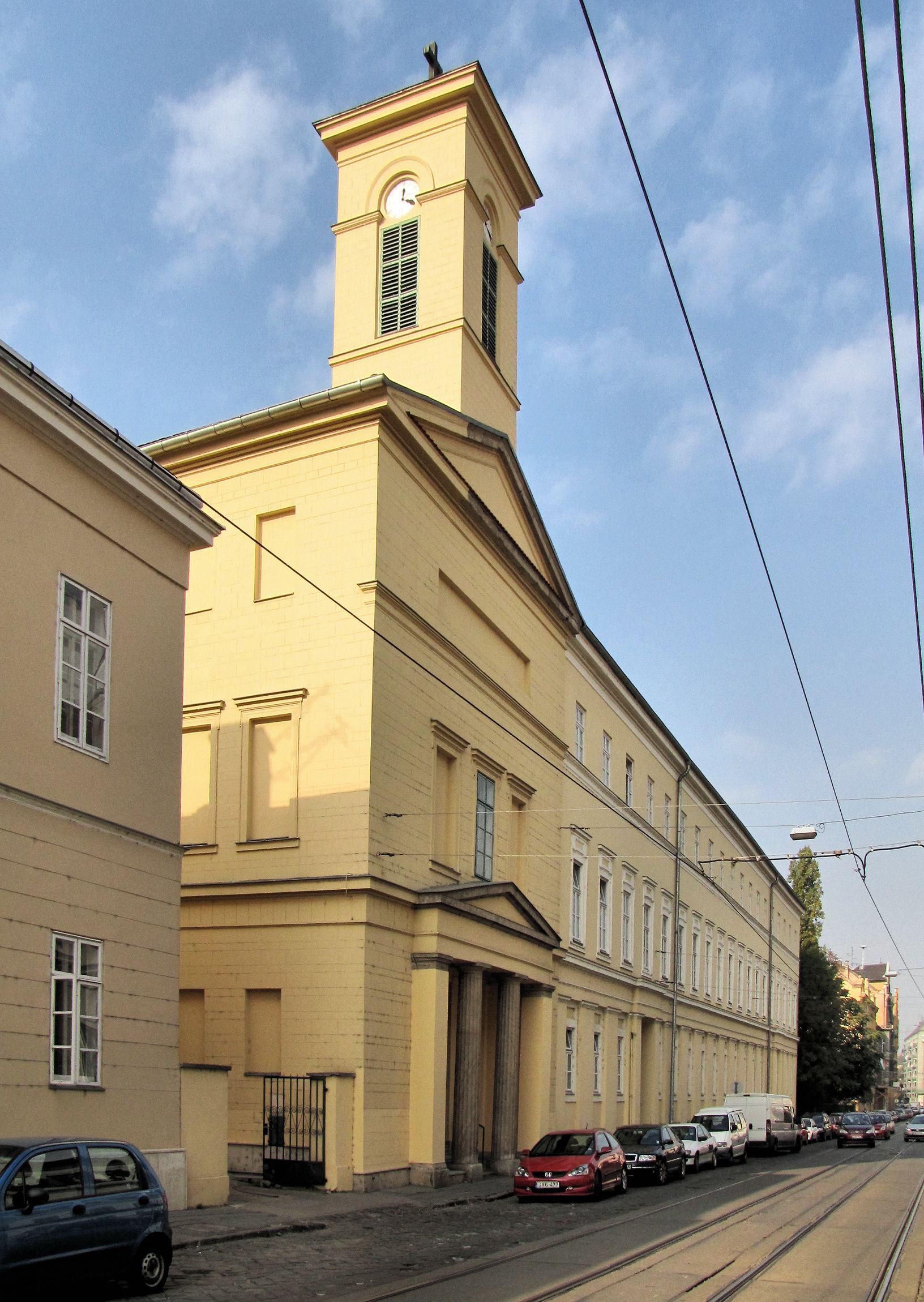
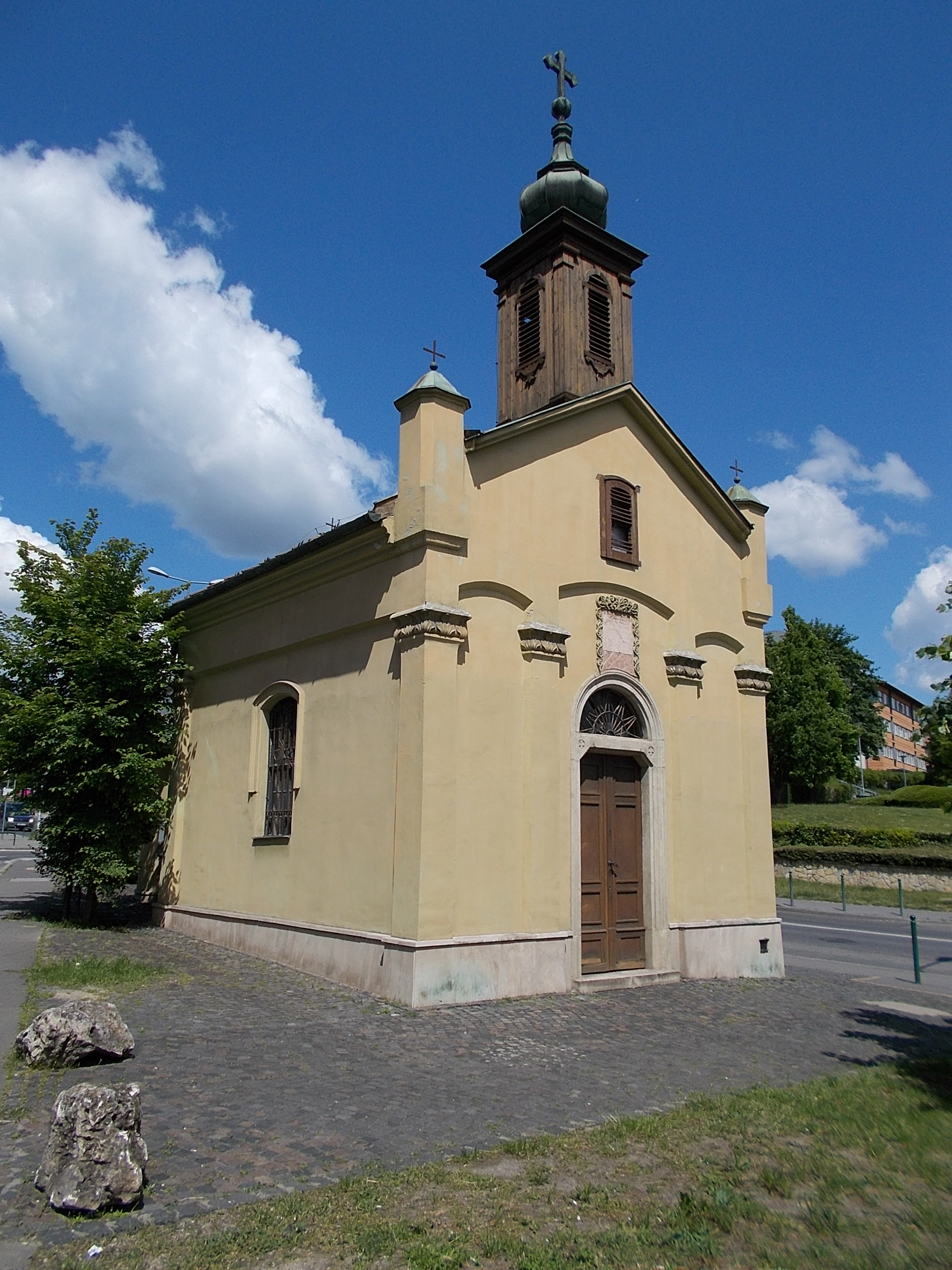
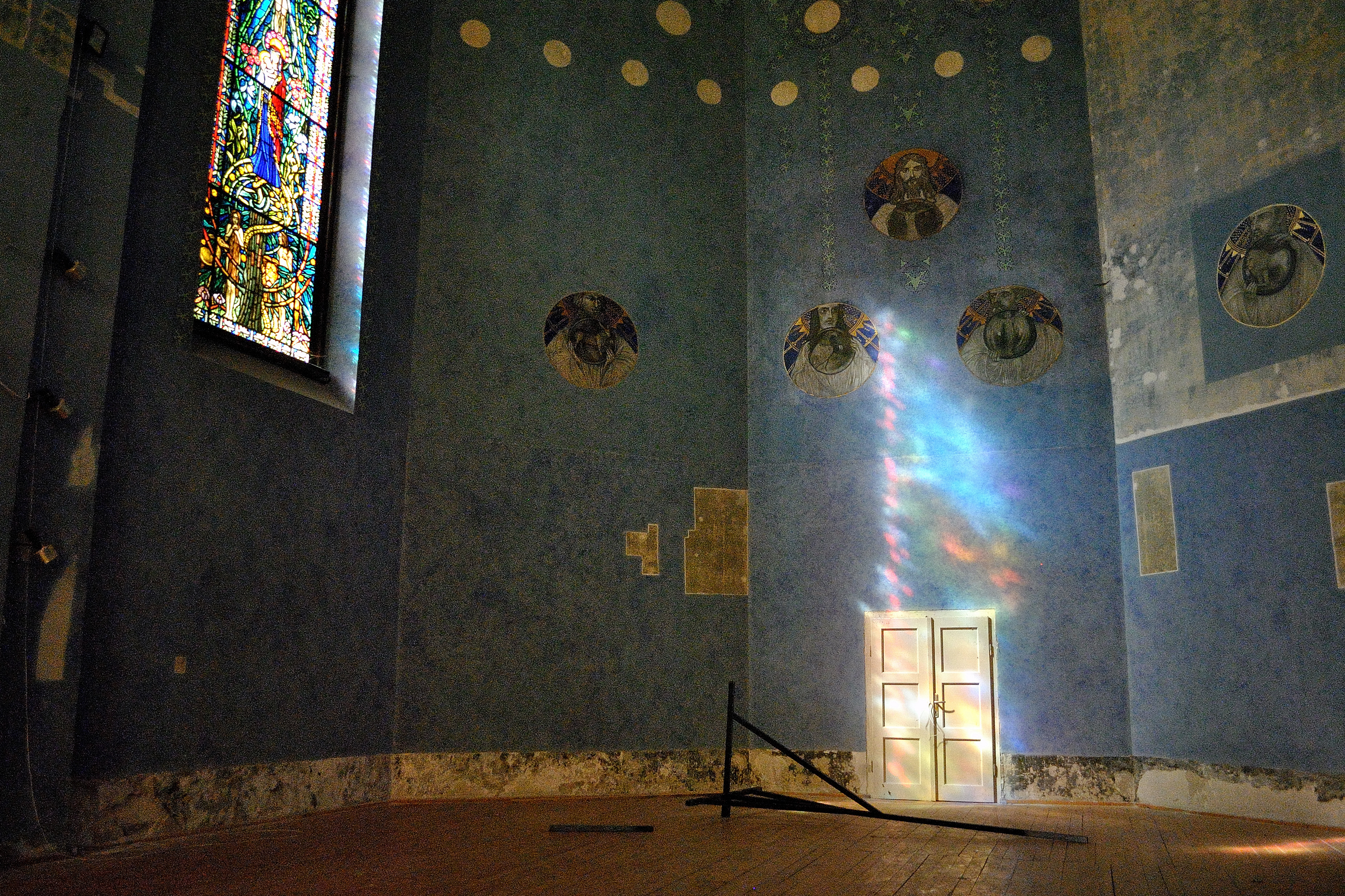
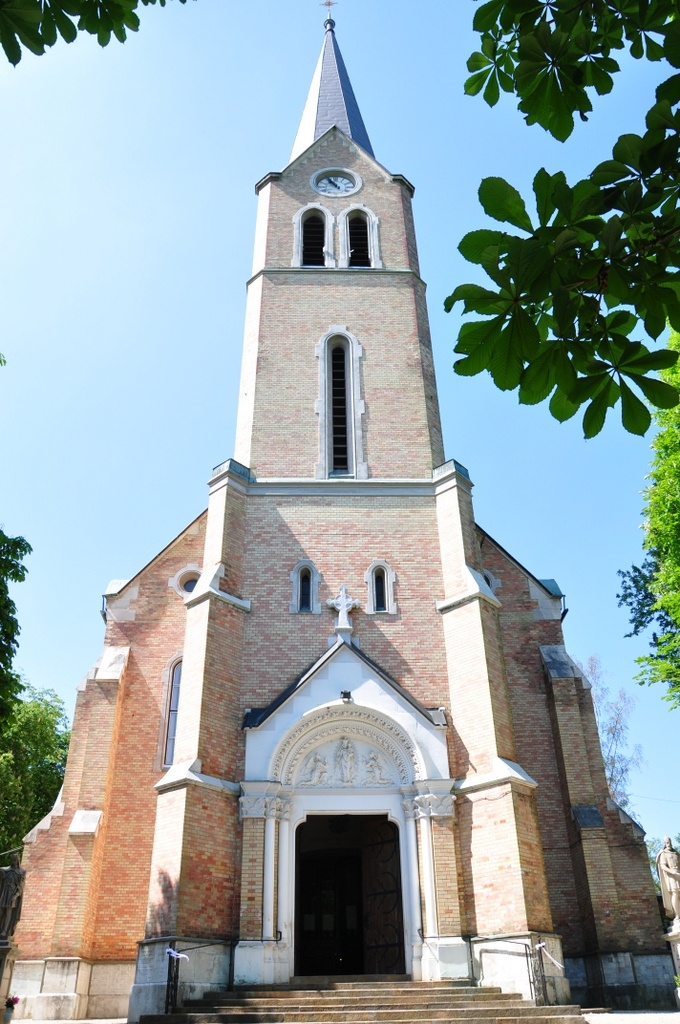
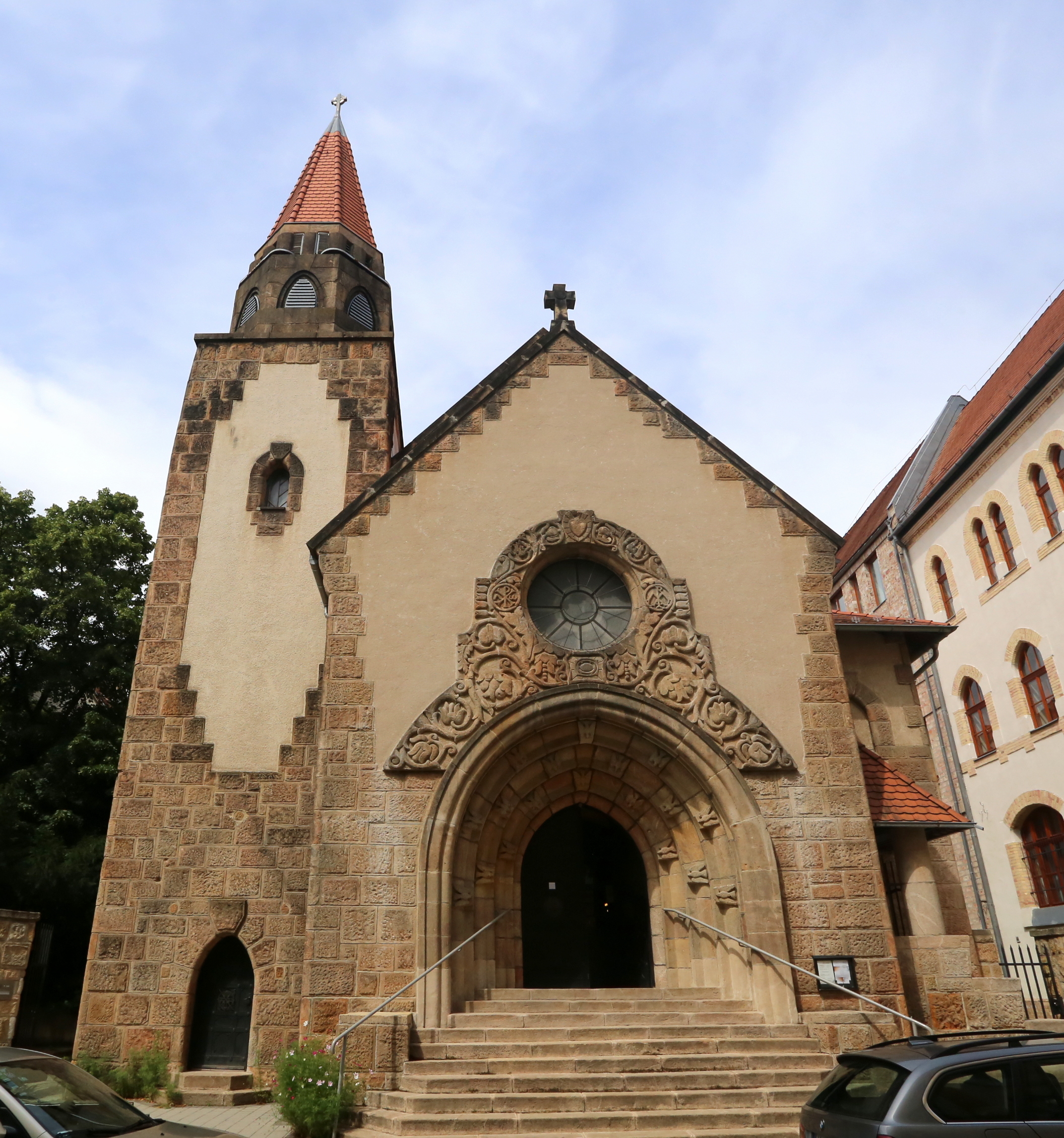
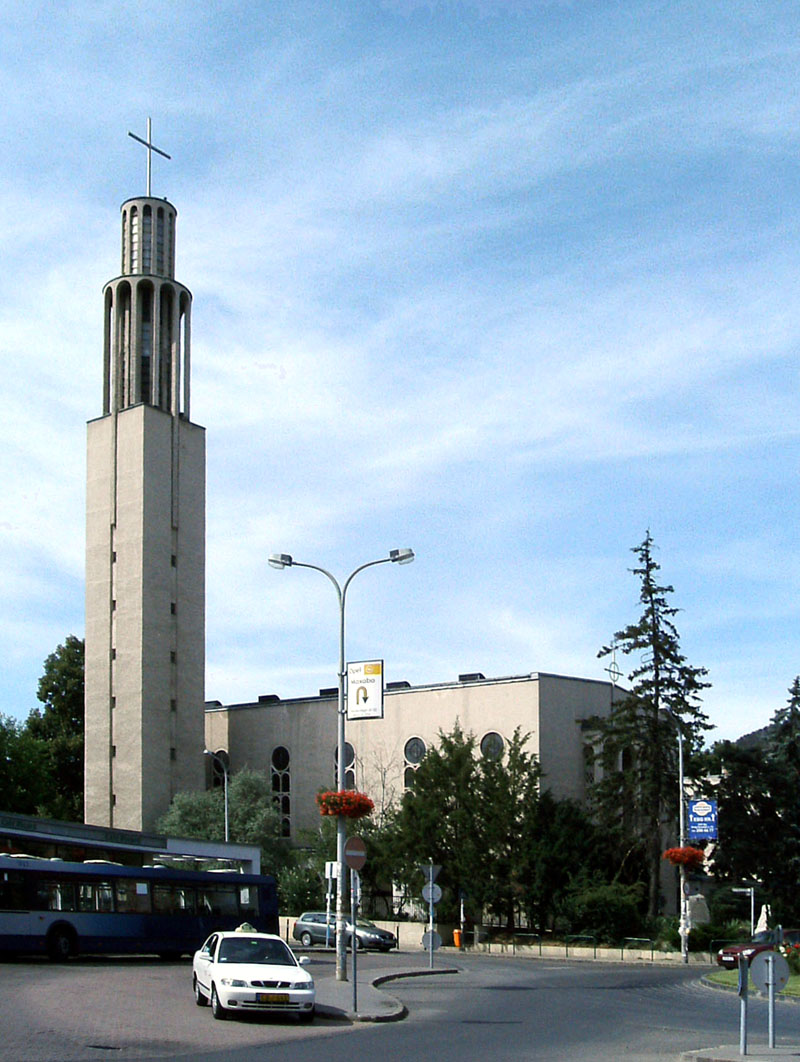
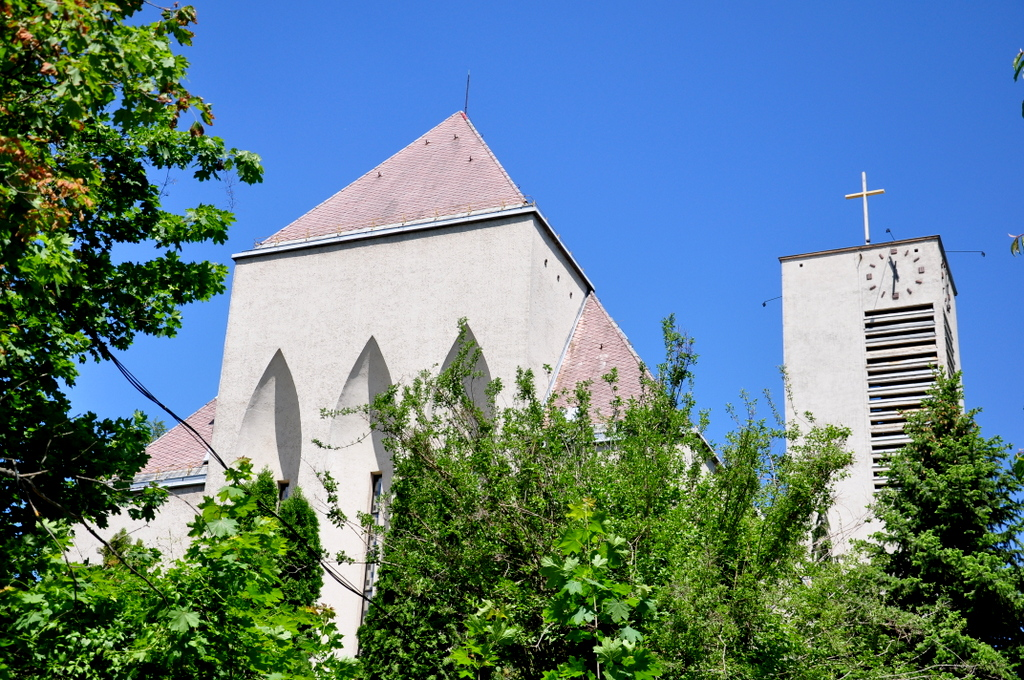
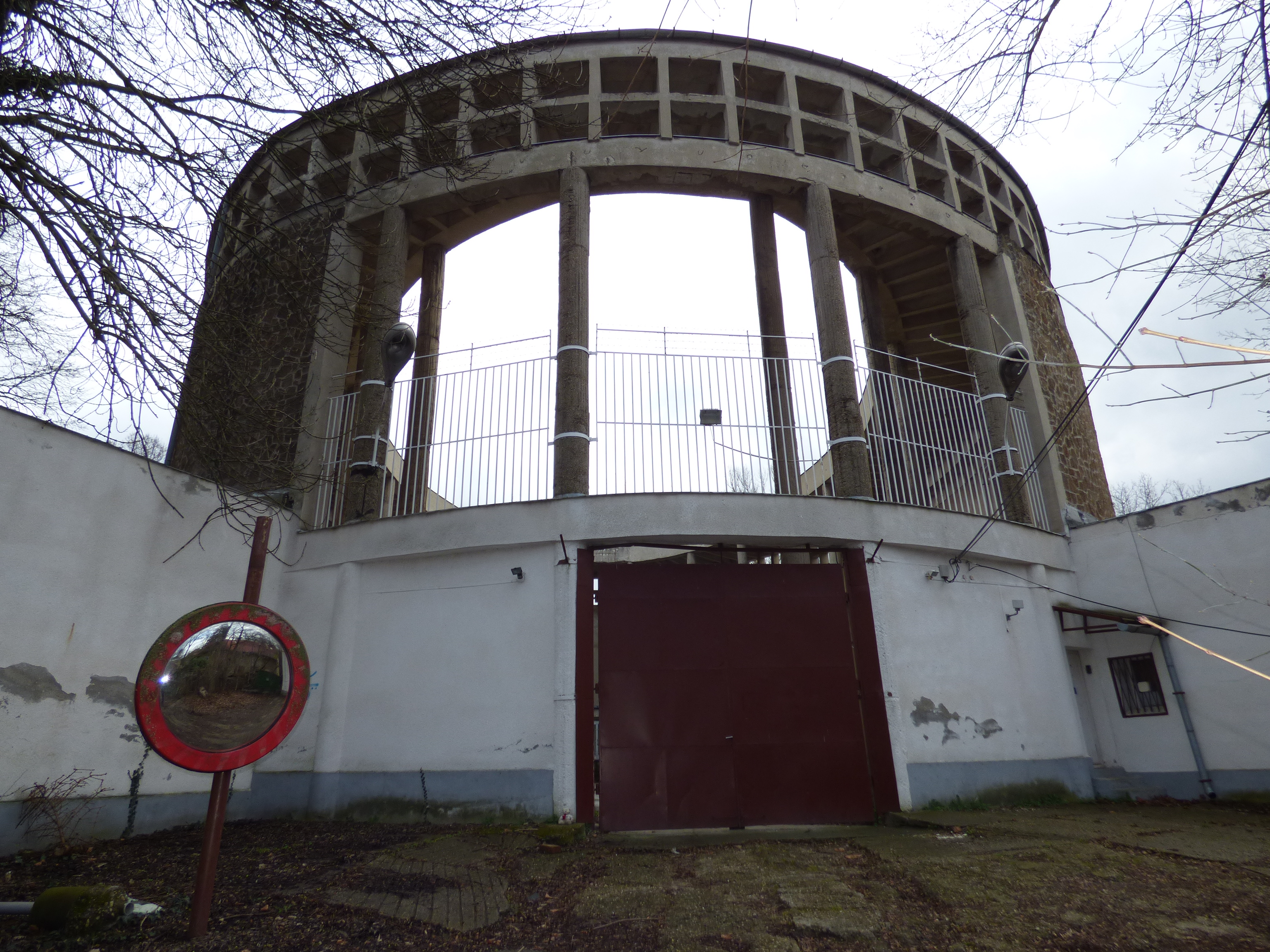
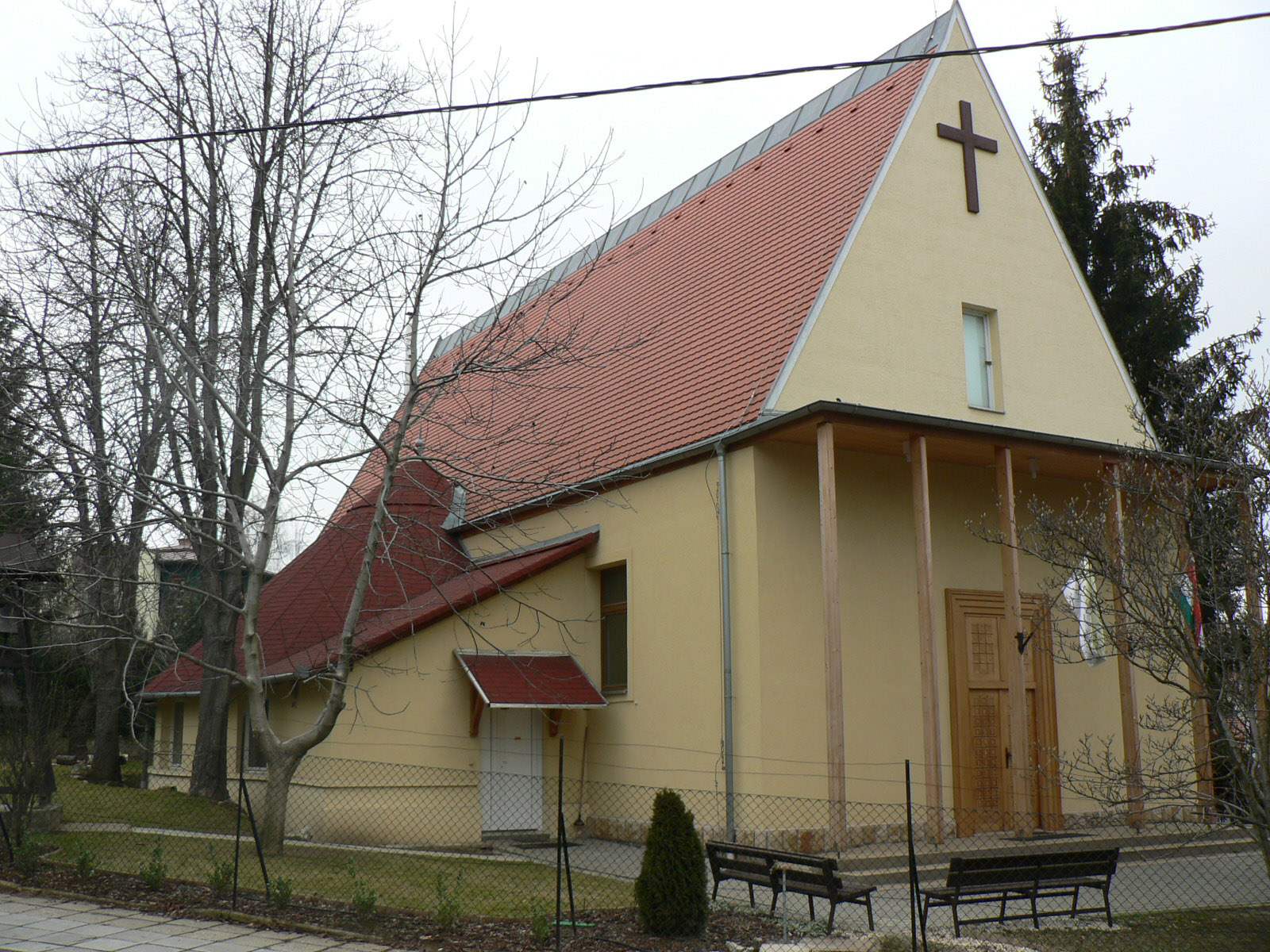
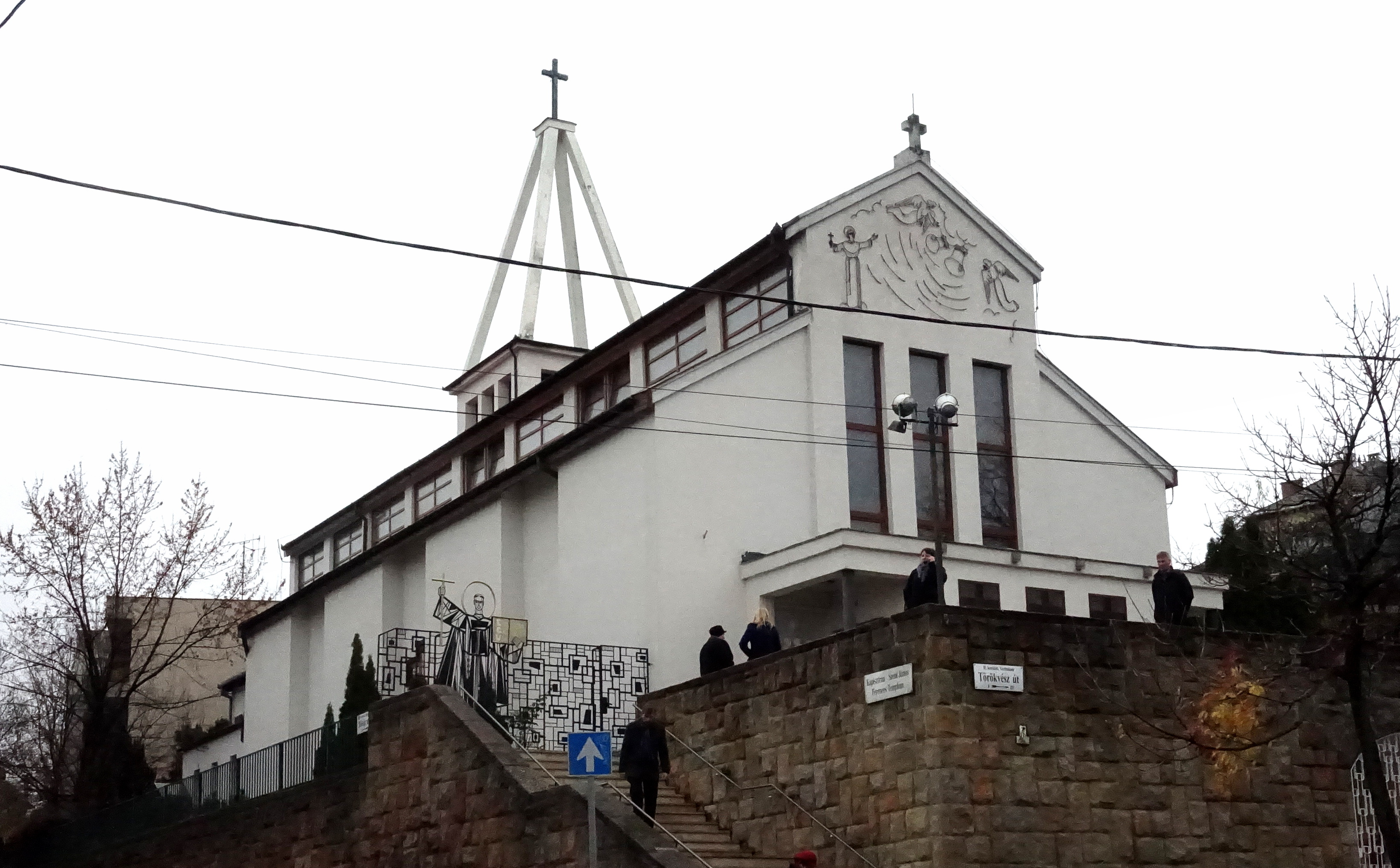
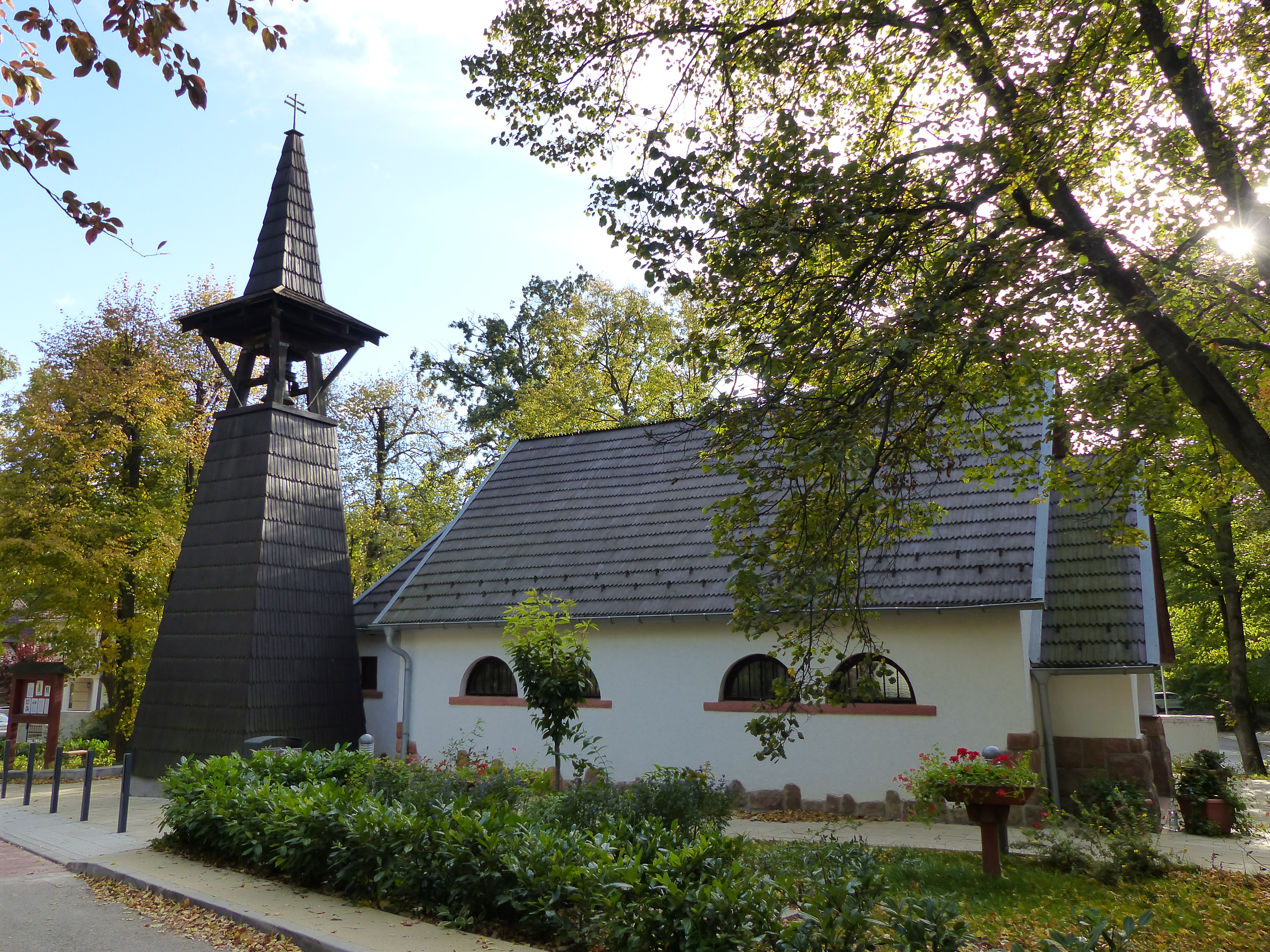
| Picture | Name | Construction time | Architectural style | Designer | Address, comments |
|---|---|---|---|---|---|
| | Gercse Parish Church (Gercsepusztai Boldogasszony templom) | 13th century (before 1333) | Romanian | n. a. | 1028 Budapest, Gercsényi u. |
| | Pesthidegkút-Ófalui Sarlós Boldogasszony plébániatemplom | 1717 | baroque | n. a. | 1028 Budapest, Templom köz 1. |
| | Budapest Országúti Szent István első vértanú templom | 1753–1770 | baroque | n. a. | 1024 Budapest, Margit körút 23. |
| | Újlaki Sarlós Boldogasszony-plébániatemplom | 1756 | baroque | Hamon Kristóf | 1021 Budapest, Bécsi út 34. |
| | Ferenc-halmi Szűz Mária- és Nepomuki Szent János-kápolna | 1821 | protoromantic | n. a. | 1021 Budapest, Budakeszi út 51. |
| | Császárfürdői Szent István-kápolna | 1844 | classicist | Hild József | 1023 Budapest, Frankel Leó út 54. |
| | Szépvölgyi úti körmeneti kápolna | 1854 | romantic | Knabe Ignác | 1025 Budapest, Szépvölgyi út 46. |
| | Az Országos Pszichiátriai és Neurológiai Intézet kápolnája | 1868 | romantic | Zettl Lajos | 1021 Hűvösvölgyi út 116. |
| | Kisboldogasszony-templom | 1899 | neogothic | Schönner Ferenc, Hauszmann Alajos | 1029 Budapest, Templomkert utca 1. |
| | Rózsadombi Krisztus Király-templom | 1926 | Hungarian folk | Árkay Aladár | 1024 Keleti Károly u. 39. |
| | Páduai Szent Antal-plébániatemplom (Pasaréti téri templom) | 1930–1934 | modern | Gyula Rimanóczy | 1026 Budapest, Pasaréti út 137. |
| | Remetekertvárosi Szentlélek-plébániatemplom | 1937–1942 | neo-romanesque (?) | Kismarty-Lechner Jenő | 1028 Budapest, Máriaremetei út 34. |
| | Magyar Szentföld-templom | 1940–1949 | bauhaus (modern) | Molnár Farkas | 1021 Budapest, Heinrich István u. 3. It is not finished. |
| | Széphalmi Jézus Szíve-plébániatemplom | 1948–1951 | modern | Sándor Marosi | 1028 Budapest, Kossuth Lajos utca 13. |
| | Kapisztrán Szent János-templom | 1949–1950 | modern | Sai-Halász Antal | 1022 Budapest, Tövis u. 1/a. |
| | Jézus szíve kápolna (Tárogató úti Jézus Szíve kápolna) | 1959 | Hungarian folk (?) | Schoditsch Lajos, Eberling Béla (a villa) | 1021 Budapest, Tárogató út 77. It was built in 1912 according to the plans of Lajos Schoditsch and Béla Eberling. |
| | Szent Lukács-kórházkápolna | 2010 | n. a. | n. a. | 1023 Budapest, Frankel Leó út 25–29. It operates in the National Institute of Rheumatology and Physiotherapy. |
| | Assisi Szent Ferenc-kórházkápolna | 2019 | modern | n. a. | 1021 Budapest, Széher út 71–73. It operates in St. Francis Hospital. |
| | Adyligeti Szent István király kápolna | n. a. | n. a. | n. a. | 1029 Budapest, Feketerigó u. 28/b. |

=== Greek Catholic churches ===
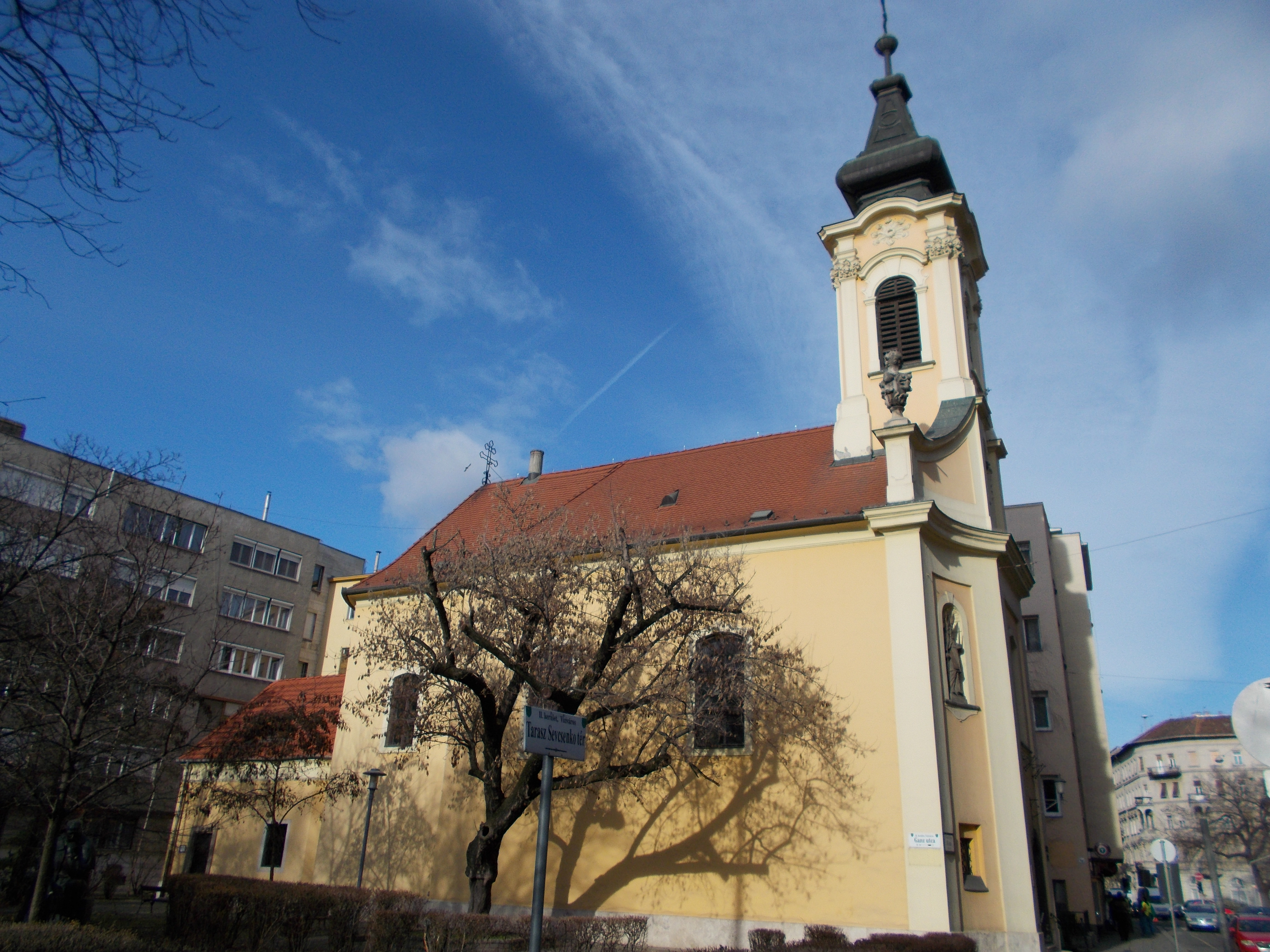
| Picture | Name | Construction time | Architectural style | Designer | Address, comments |
|---|---|---|---|---|---|
| | Szent Flórián vértanú görögkatolikus templom | 1754 | baroque | Nöpauer Máté (part of it) | 1027 Budapest, Fő utca 88. |

=== Reformed churches ===
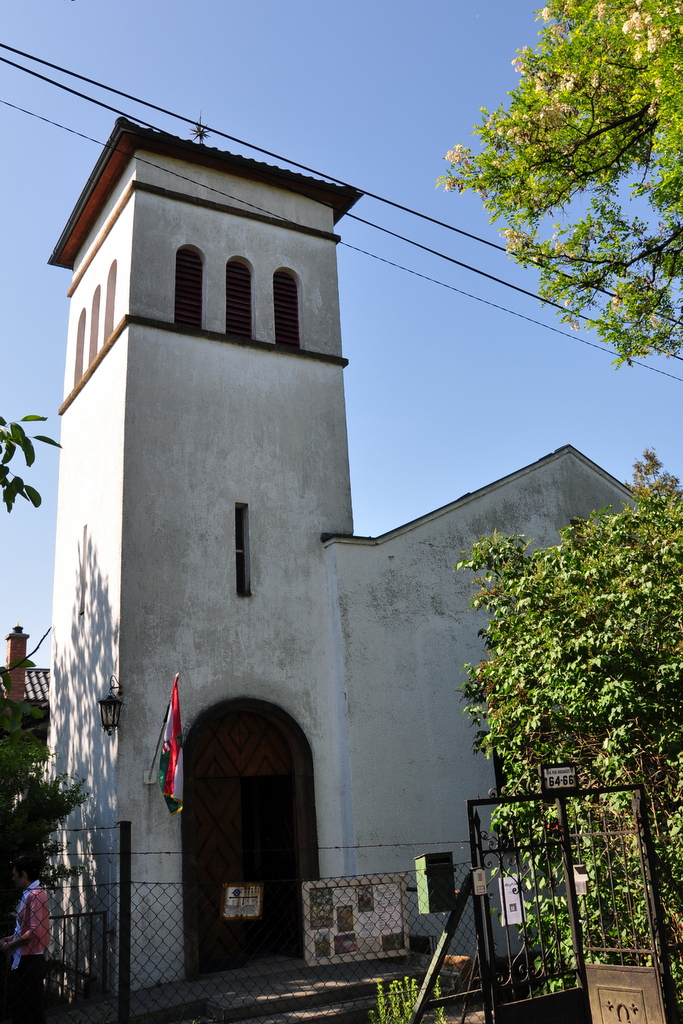
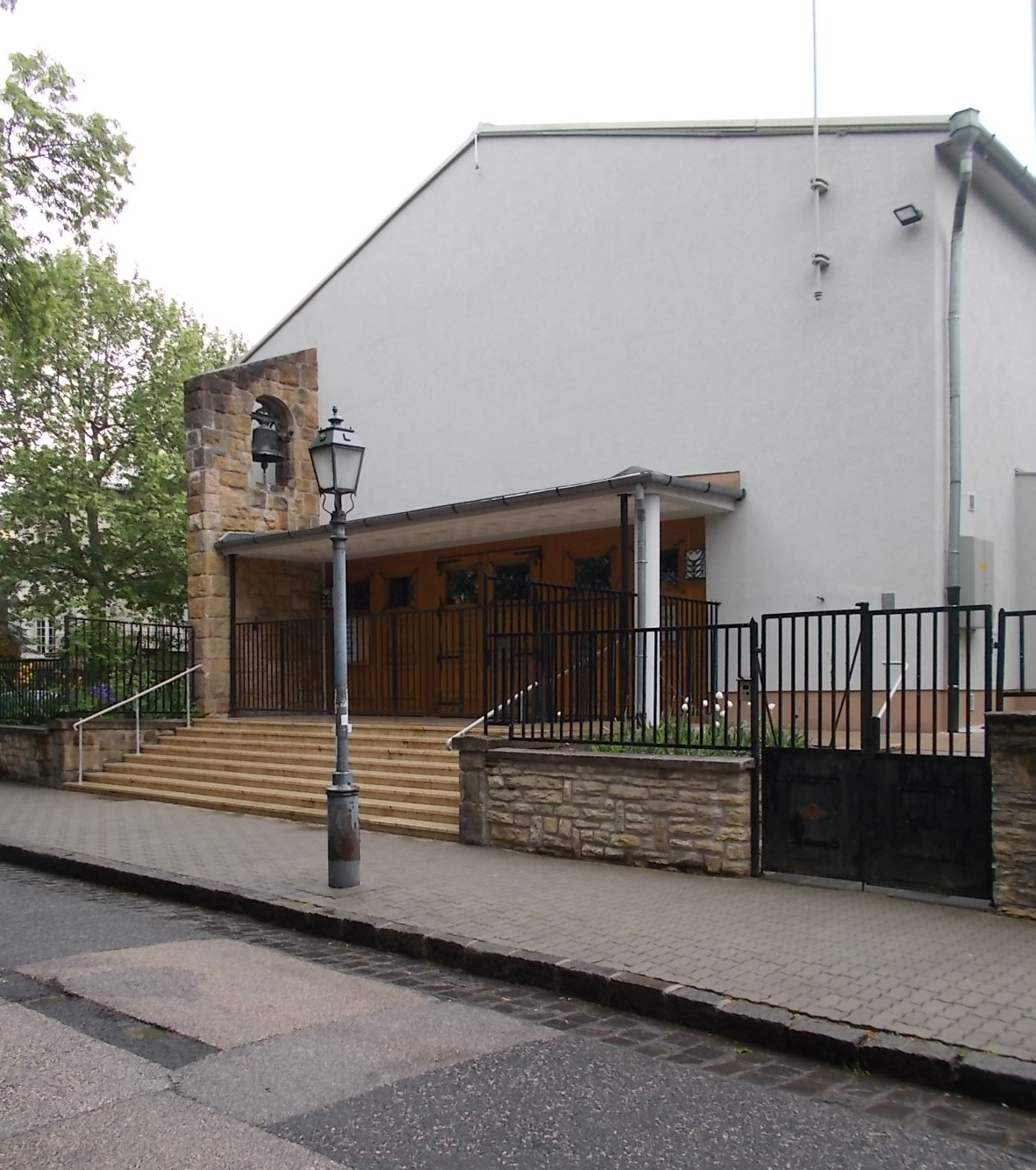
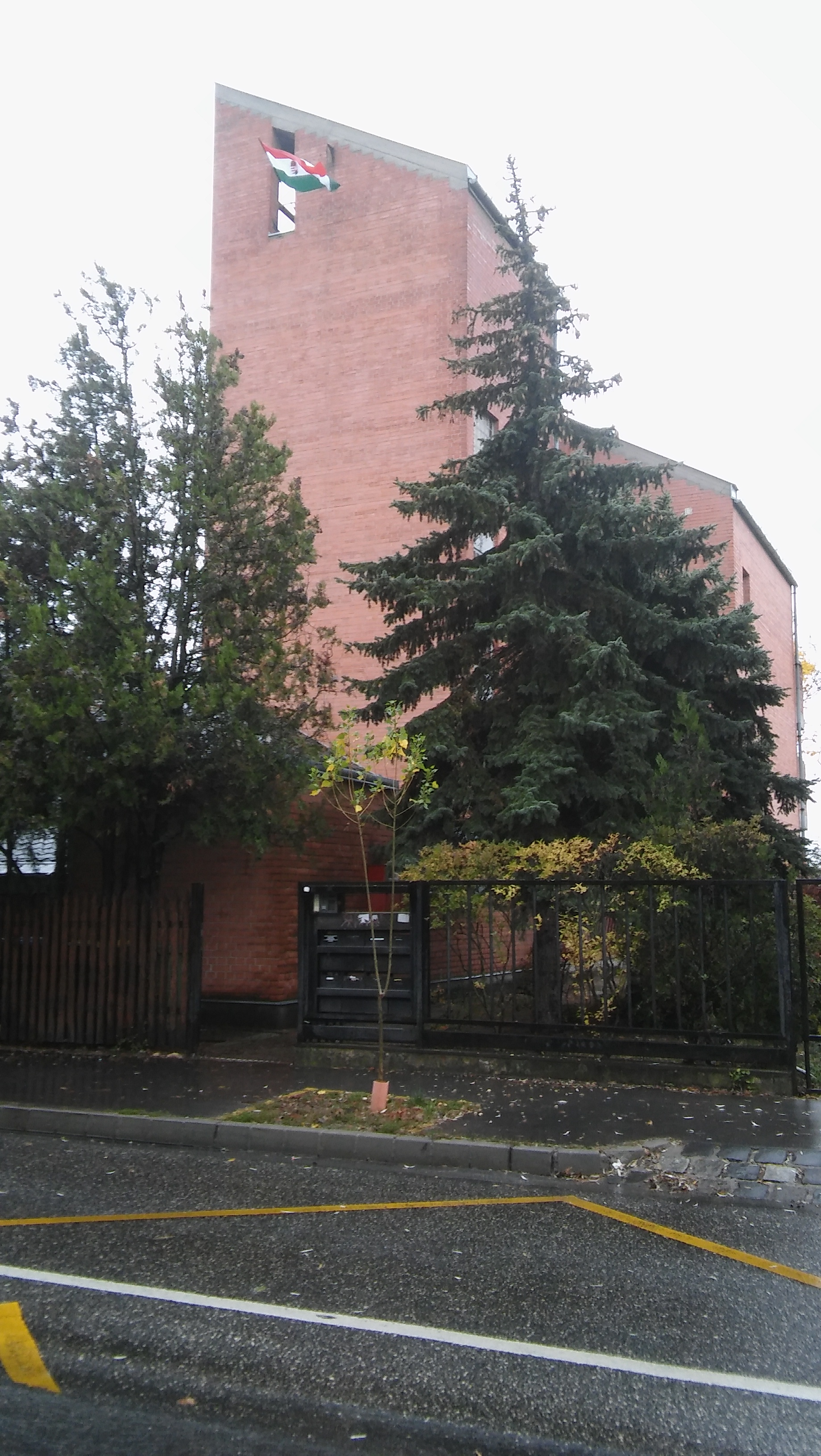
| Picture | Name | Construction time | Architectural style | Designer | Address, comments |
|---|---|---|---|---|---|
| | Pesthidegkúti református templom | 1939 | n. a. | Zoltán Kárpáthy | 1028 Budapest, Hidegkúti út 64–66. |
| | Pasaréti református templom | 1939 | bauhaus | n. a. | 1026 Budapest, Torockó tér 1. |
| | Cimbalom utcai református templom | 1980–1983 | late modern | István Szabó | 1025 Budapest, Cimbalom u. 22–24. |

=== Evangelical churches ===
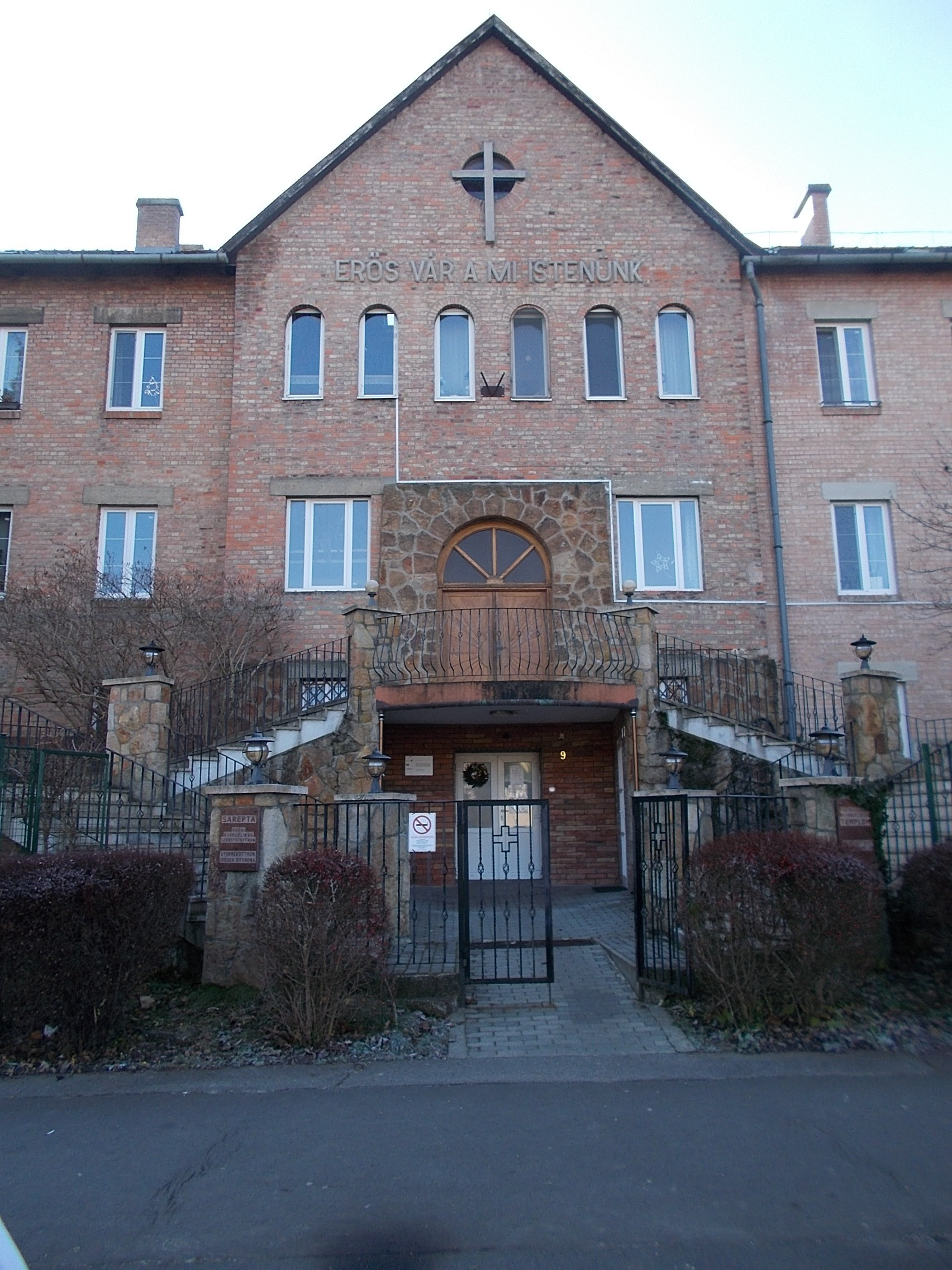
| Picture | Name | Construction time | Architectural style | Designer | Address, comments |
|---|---|---|---|---|---|
| | Pesthidegkúti evangélikus templom | 1941–1944 | n. a. | Gyula Sándy | 1029 Budapest, Báthory utca 8. The building of the Sarepta Lutheran Home of Love in Buda gives its space. |
| | Fébé Evangélikus Diakonissza Egyesület Anyaház imaterme | n. a. | n. a. | n. a. | 1021 Budapest, Hűvösvölgyi út 121. |

== District III ==
=== Roman Catholic churches ===
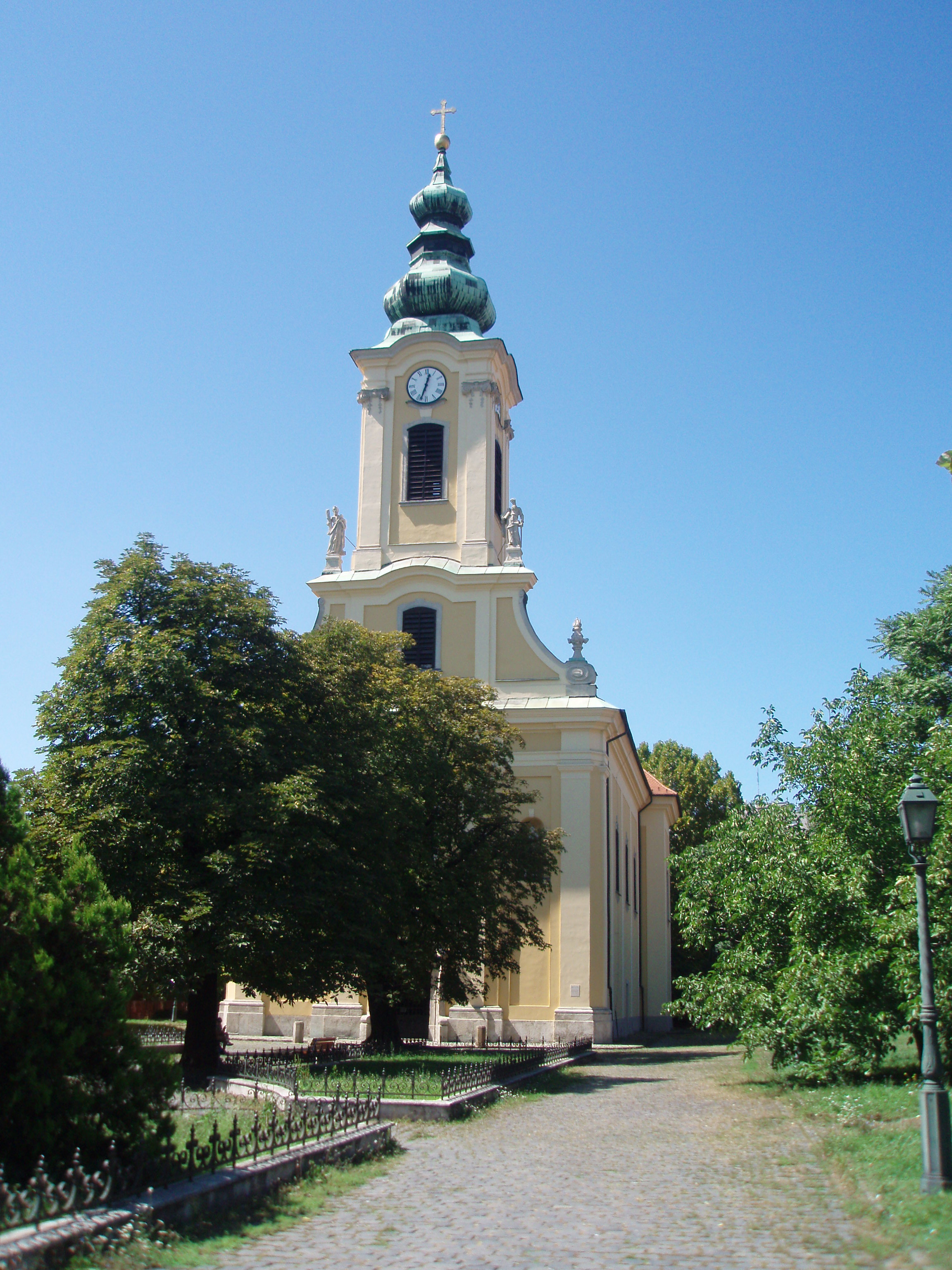
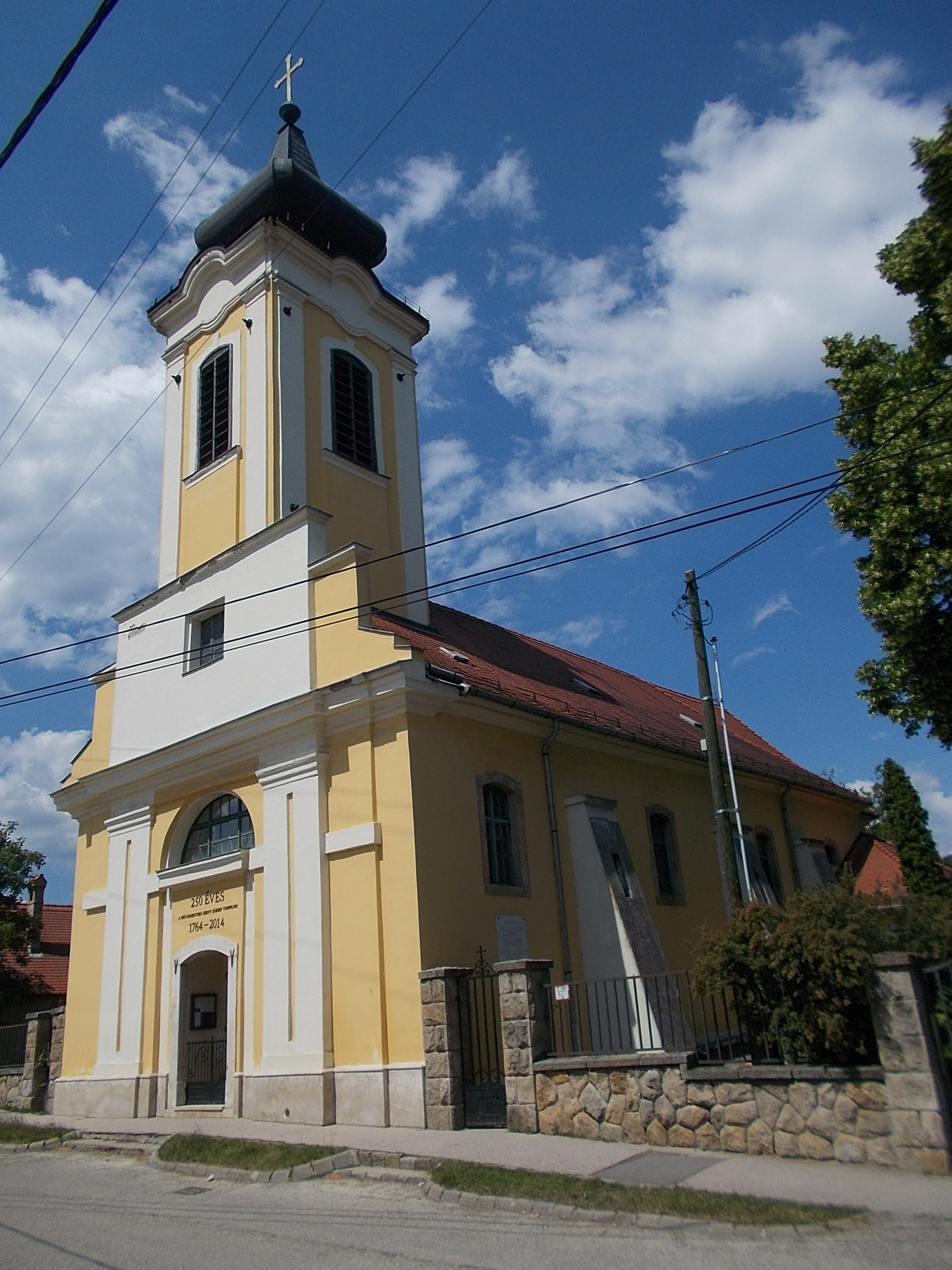
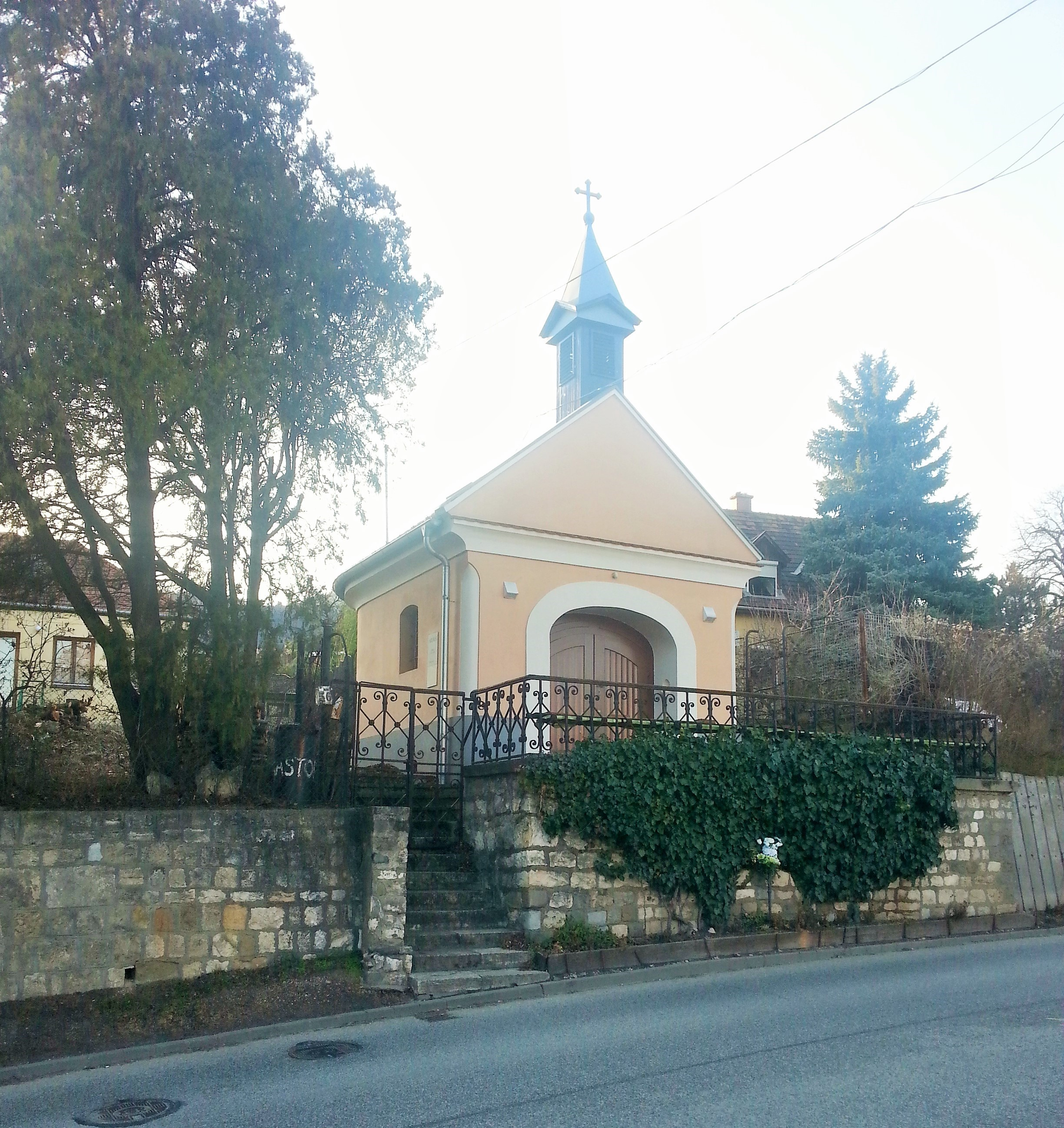
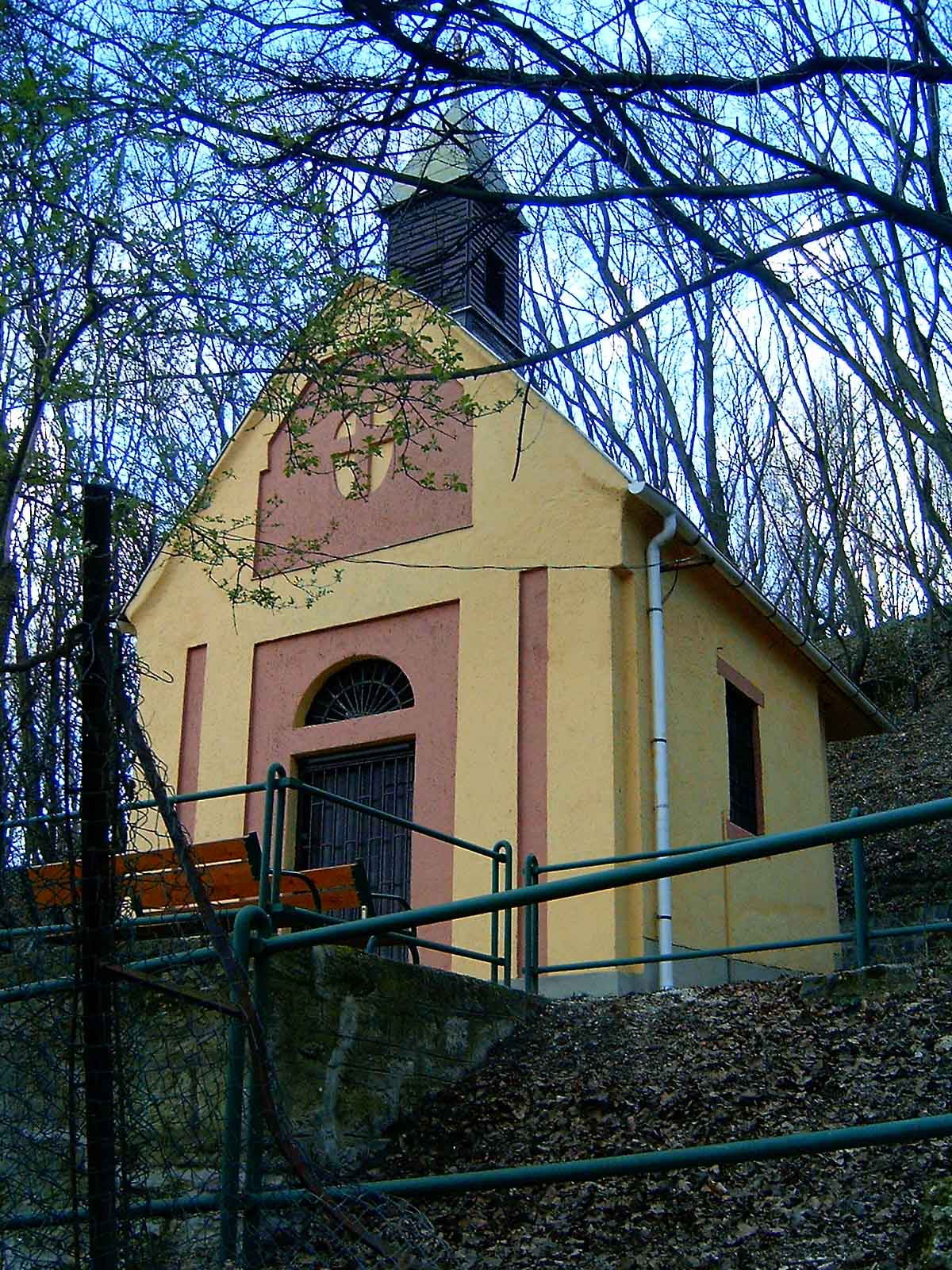
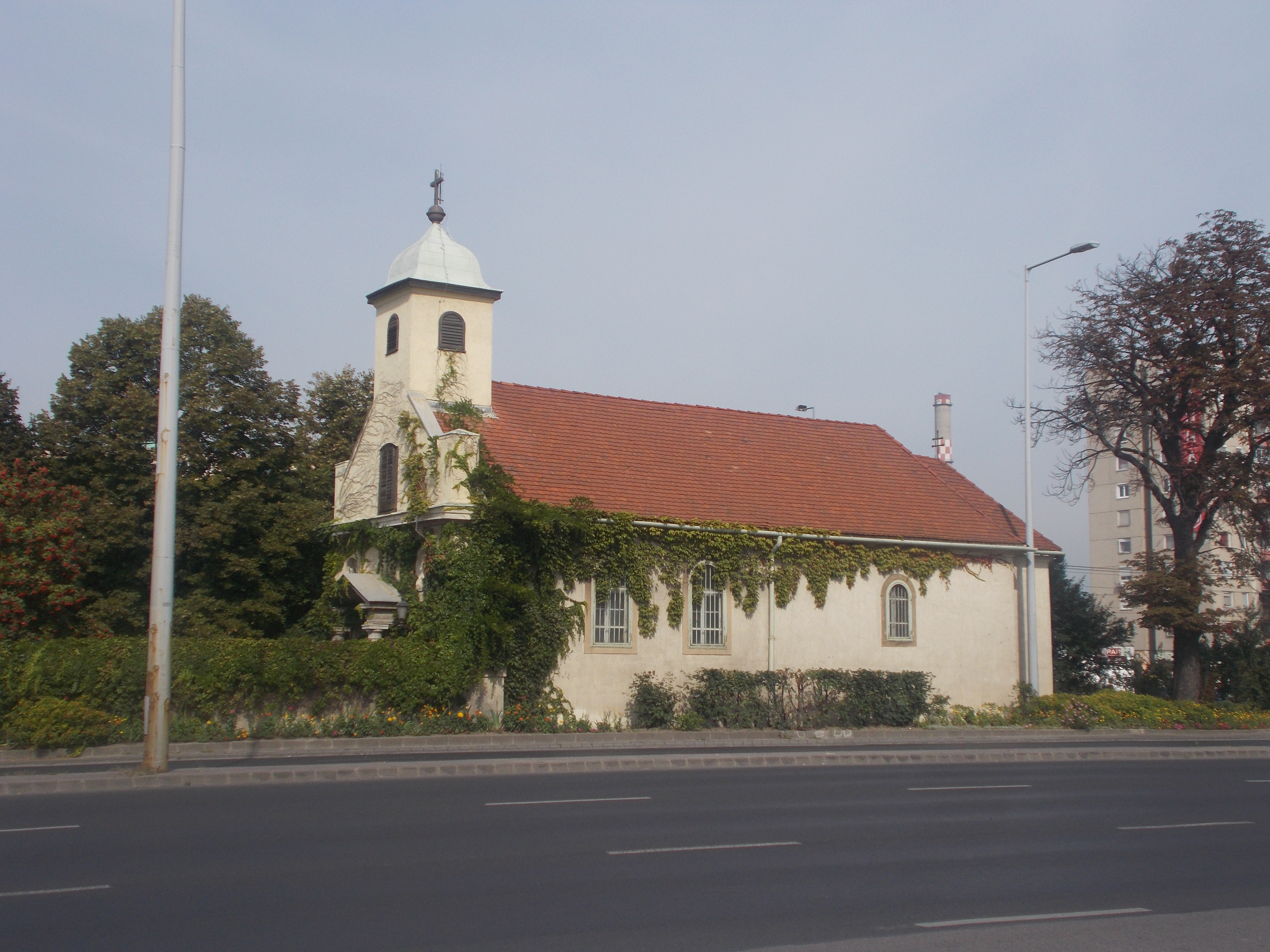
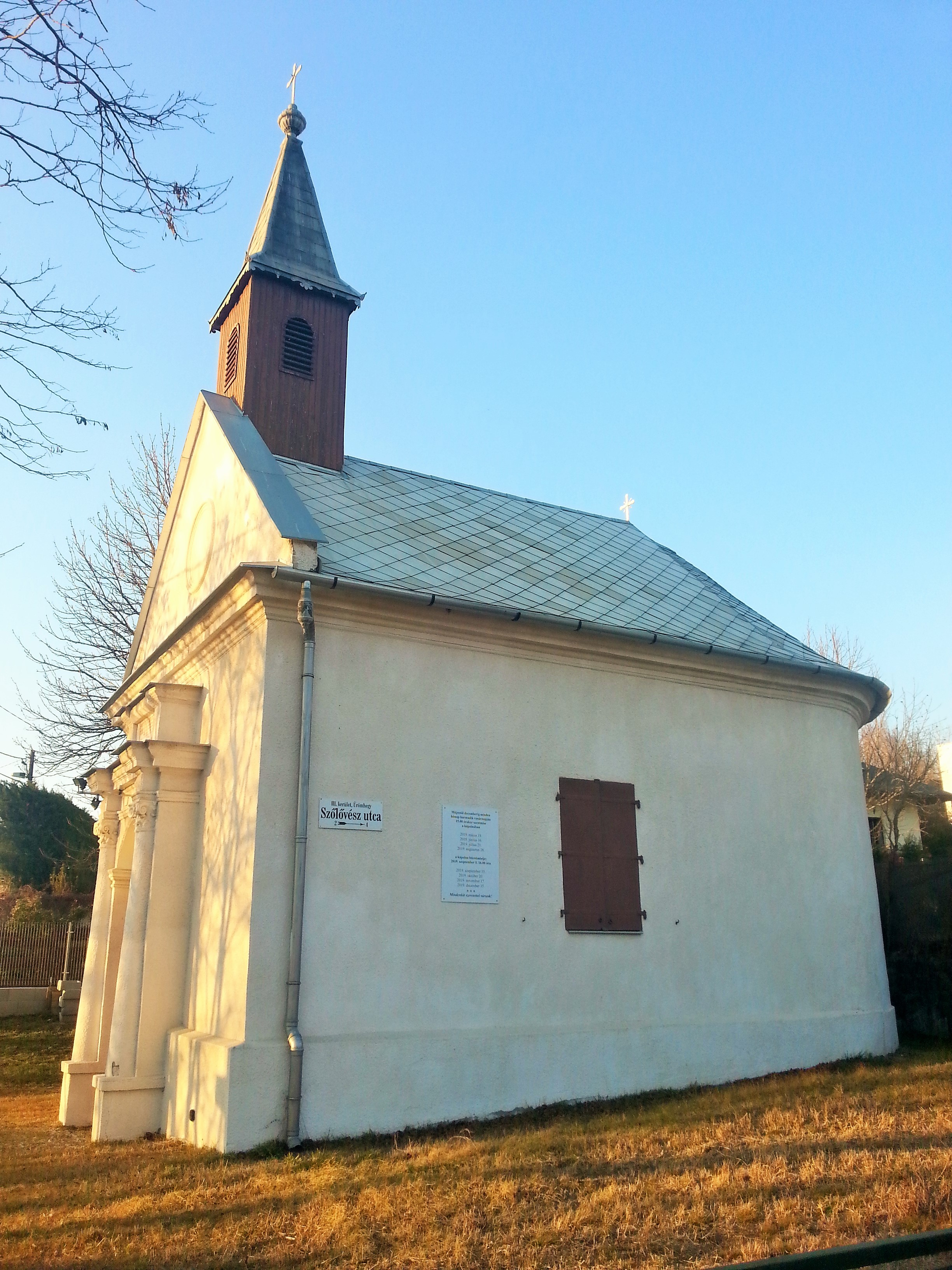
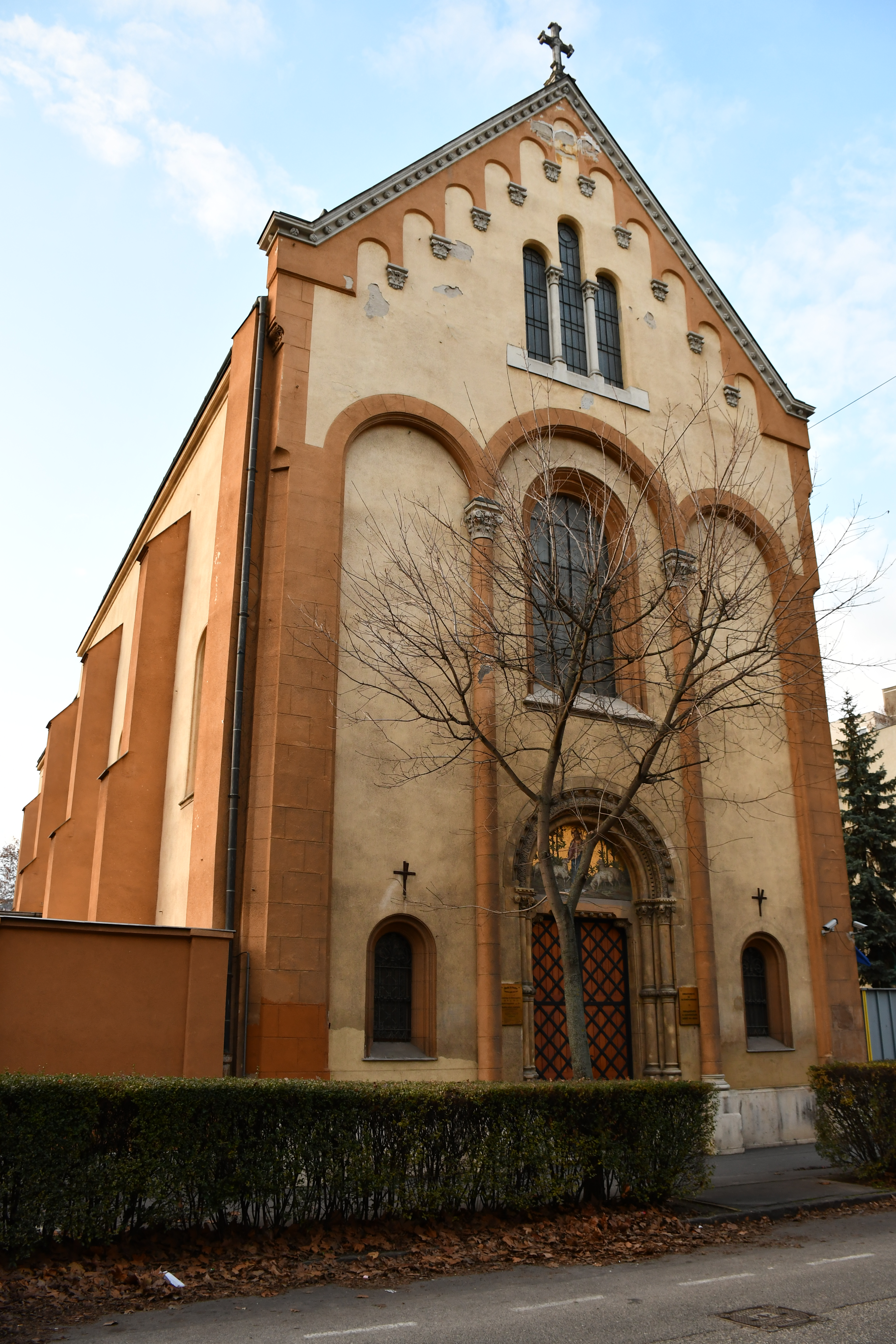
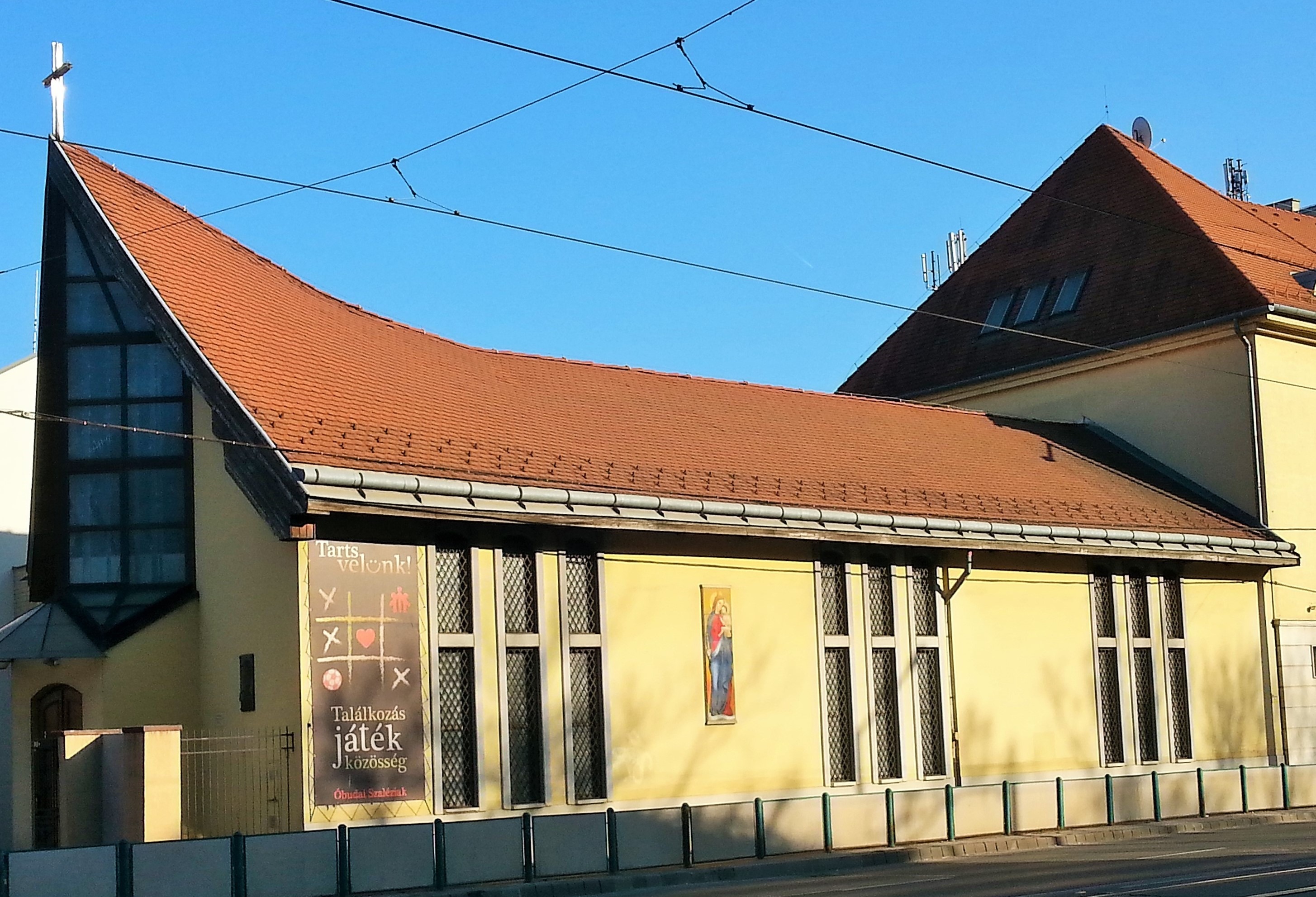
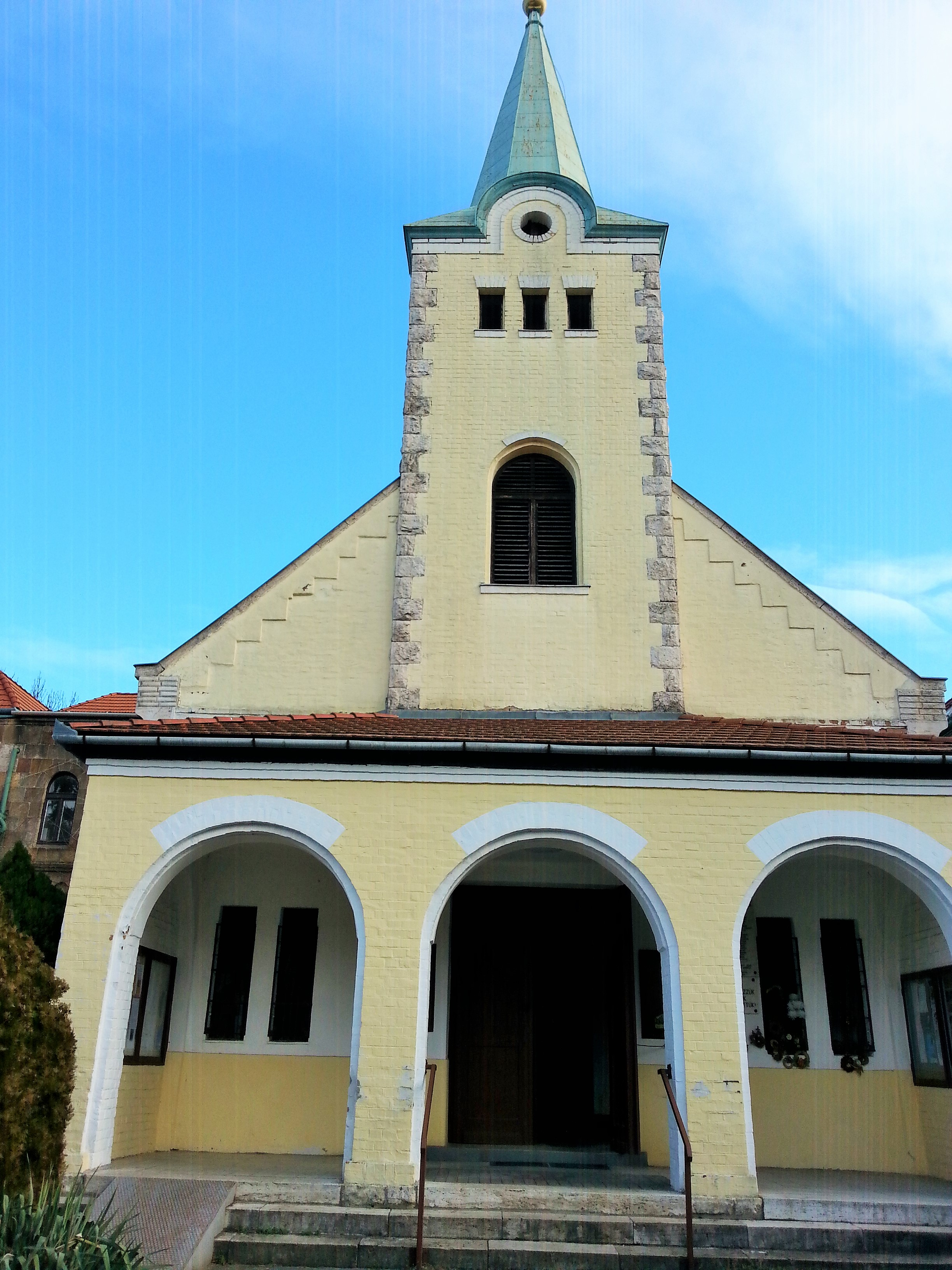
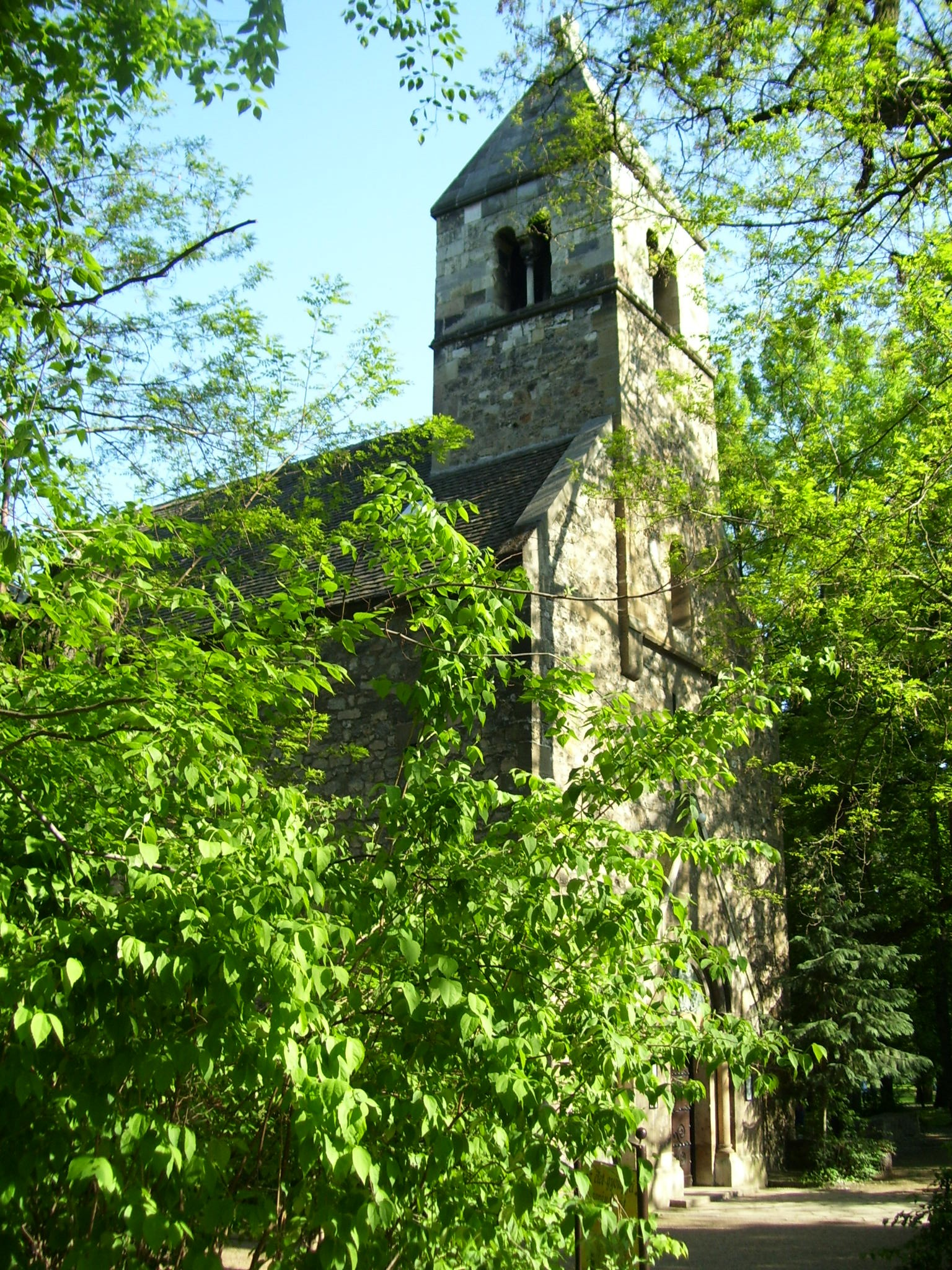
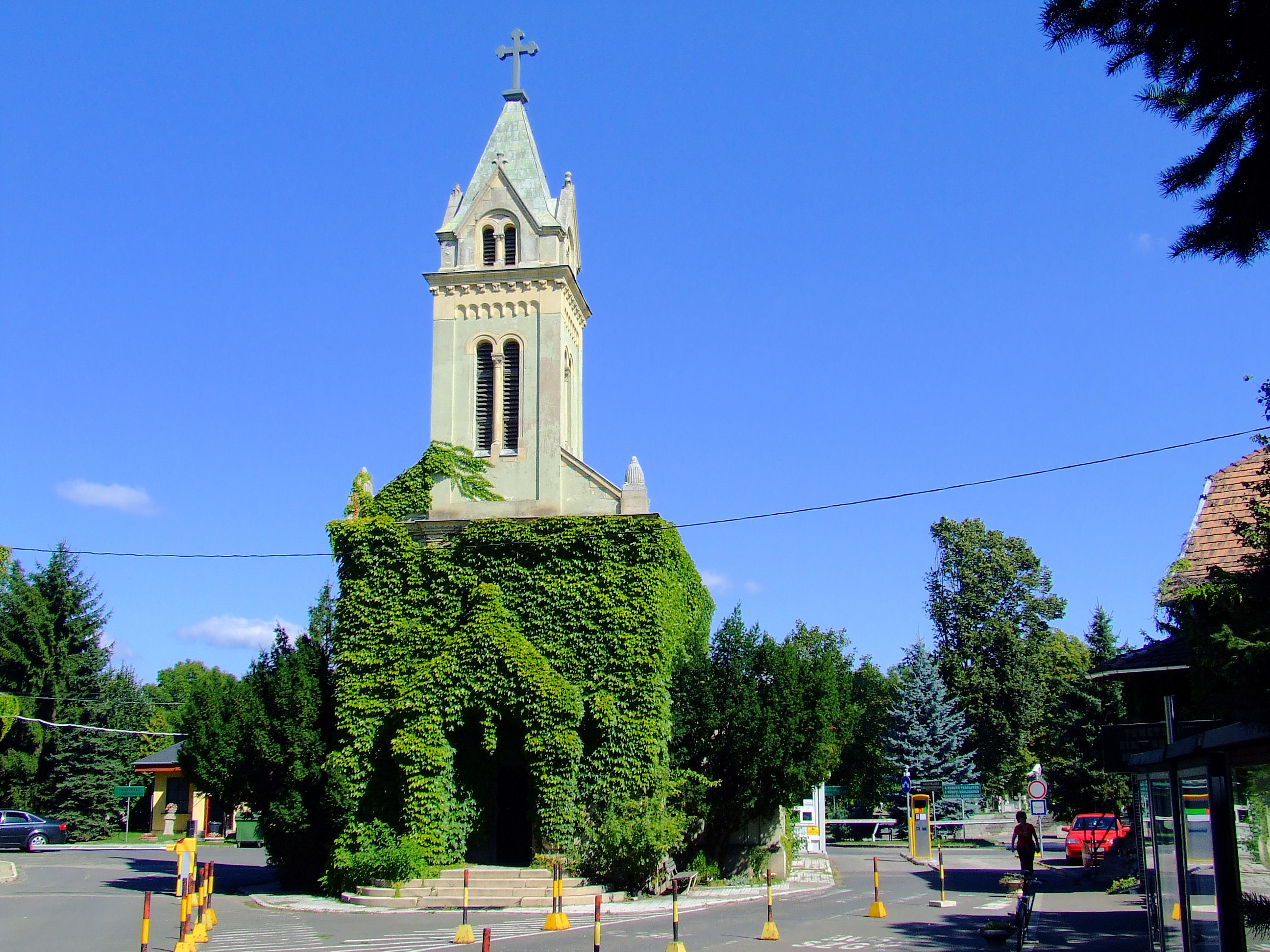
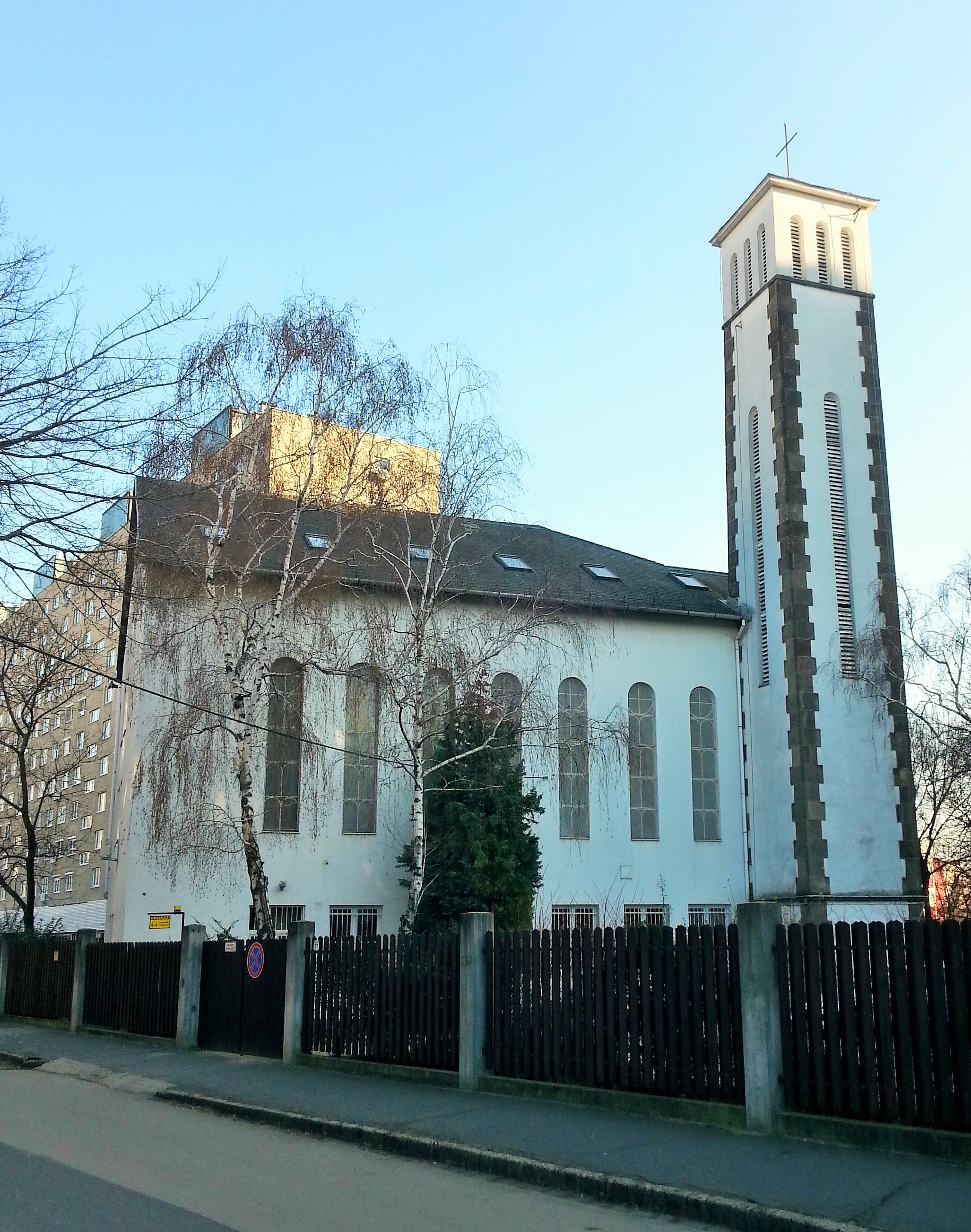
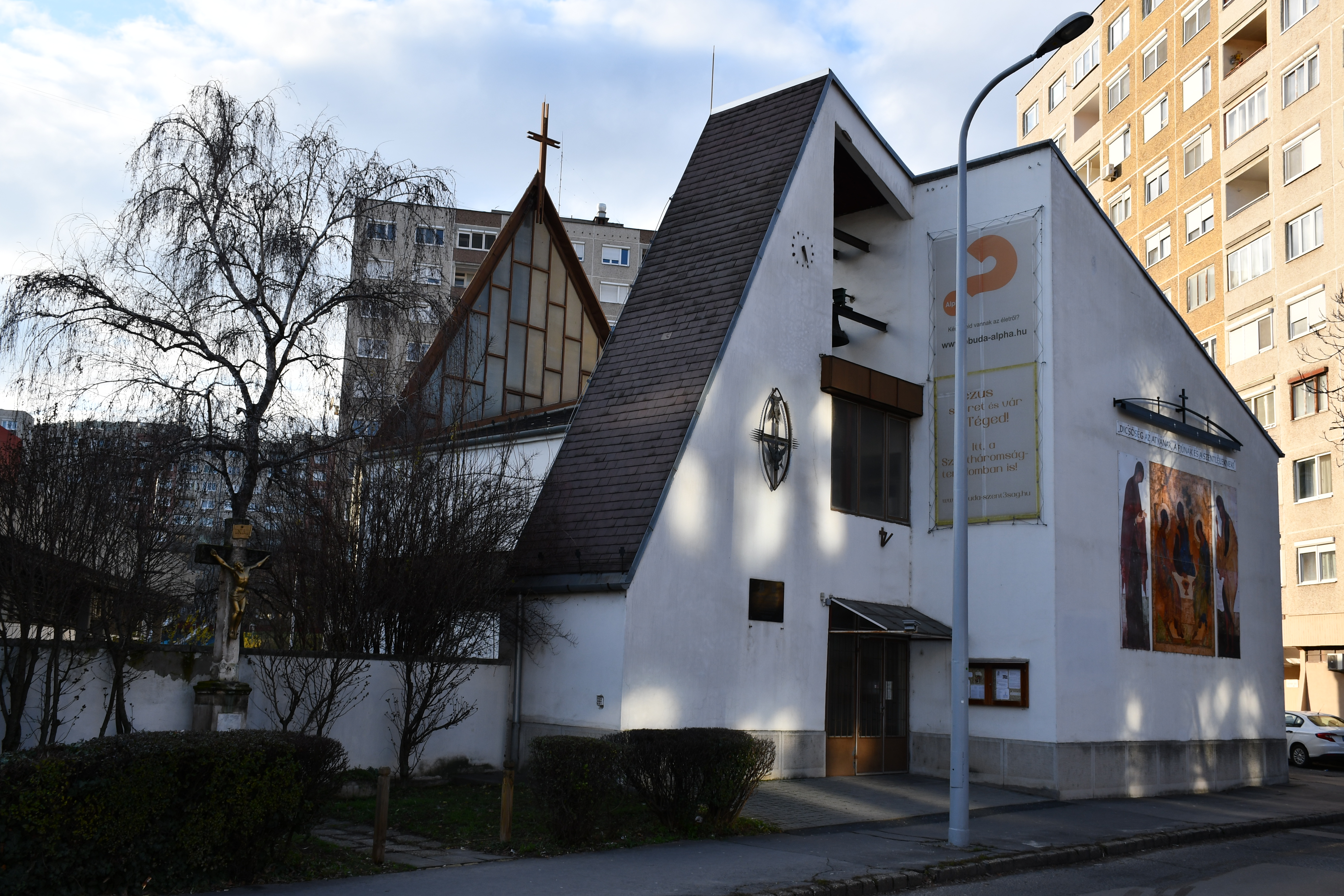
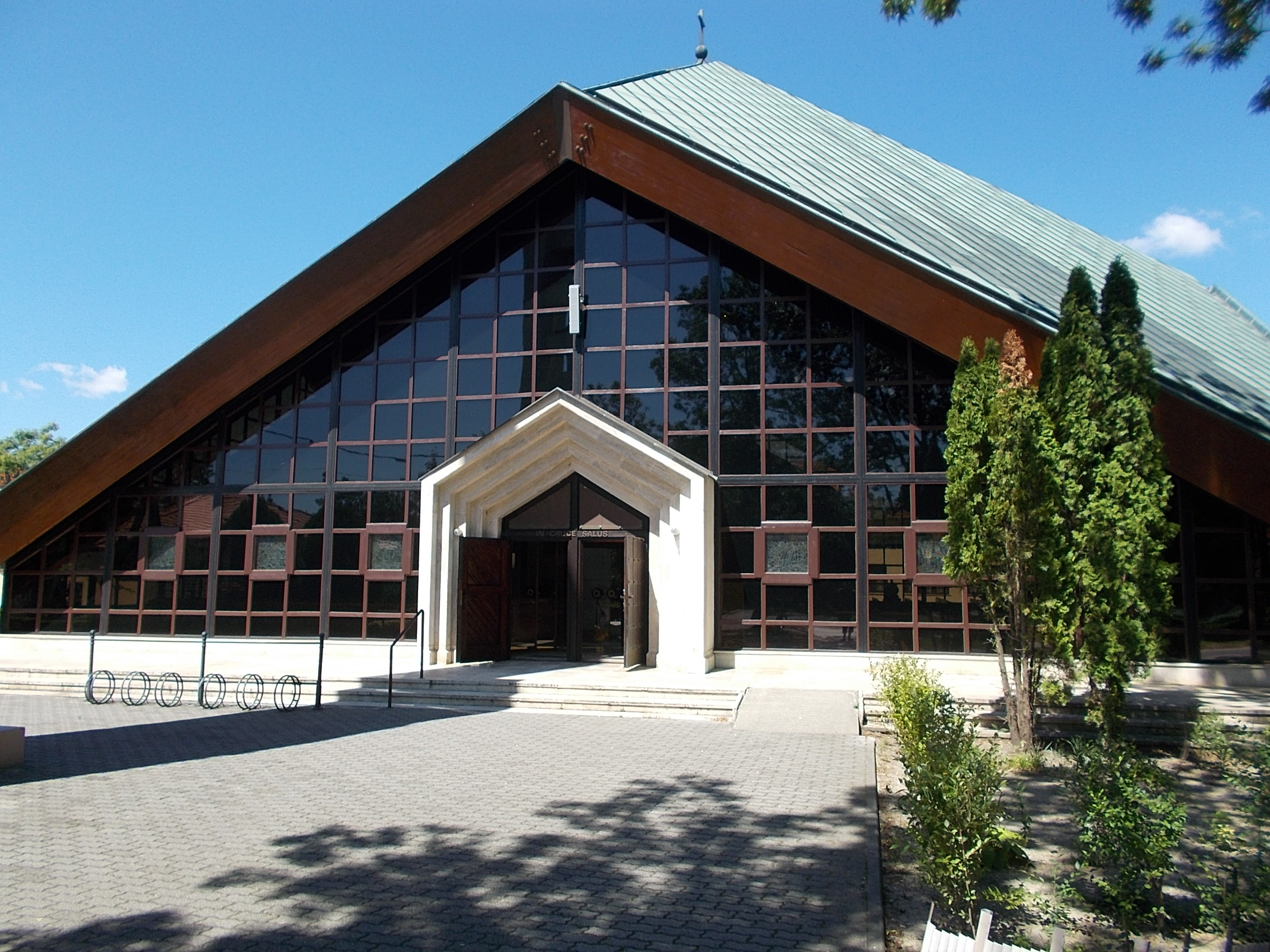
| Picture | Name | Construction time | Architectural style | Designer | Address, comments |
|---|---|---|---|---|---|
| | Szent Péter és Pál-főplébánia-templom | 1744–1749 | baroque | Paur János György | 1036 Budapest, Lajos u. 168. |
| | Budapest-Békásmegyer-Ófalui Szent József plébániatemplom | 1754–1789 | baroque | Scháden János Mihály | 1038 Budapest, Templom u. 18. |
| | Farkastoroki Szent Donát-kápolna | 1781 | baroque (?) | n. a. | 1037 Budapest, Farkastoroki út 56. |
| | Szent Vér kápolna (Kiscelli kálvária kápolna) | 1812–1814 | classicist | n. a. | 1034 Budapest, Doberdó út |
| | Kövi Szűz Mária-plébániatemplom | 1865 | neo-romanesque | Ziegler József | 1033 Budapest, Szentendrei út 69–71. |
| | Külső Bécsi úti kápolna (Filoxéra kápolna) | 1885 | n. a. | n. a. | 1037 Budapest, Külső-Bécsi út és Szőlővész utca sarok |
| | Tamás utcai urnatemető kápolnája | 19th century | n. a. | n. a. | 1038 Budapest, Tamás u. 15. |
| | Jó Pásztor-templom | 1901 | neo-romanesque | Hofhauser Antal | 1032 Budapest, Szőlő u. 56. |
| | Óbudai Segítő Szűz Mária templom (Szaléziak temploma) | 1921 (?) | n. a. | n. a. | 1032 Budapest, Bécsi út 175. |
| | Budapest-Csillaghegyi Jézus Szíve Jézus szíve plébániatemplom | 1928 | neo-romanesque (?) | n. a. | 1039 Budapest, Lehel u. 14. |
| | Margitszigeti Szent Mihály kápolna | 1930–1932 | neo-romanesque | Lux Kálmán | 1007 Budapest, Margit sziget |
| | Óbudai Feltámadt Üdvözítő temetőkápolna | 1931 | neo-gothic | n. a. | 1037 Budapest, Bécsi út 365. |
| | Óbudai Szent József templom (Kórház utcai kápolna) | 1941 | n. a. | Ferenc Rácz | 1035 Budapest, Kórház u. 37. |
| | Budapest-Óbuda-Hegyvidéki Szentháromság plébániatemplom | 1948 | modern | Balinszki-Cs. B. Imre | 1032 Budapest, Vörösvári út 110. |
| | Boldog Özséb-plébániatemplom | 1985–1987 | modern | n. a. | 1039 Budapest Lékai Bíboros tér 8–10. |
| | Karácsonyi Kis Jézus-plébániatemplom | 1989 | n. a. | Dombai László | 1031 Budapest, Zaránd u. 35. |
| | Csúcshegyi Szeplőtelen Szűz Mária-kápolna | n. a. | n. a. | n. a. | 1037 Budapest, Menedékház utca 24. |
| | Szent Margit kórházkápolna | n. a. | n. a. | n. a. | 1032 Budapest, Bécsi út 132. It is located in St. Margaret Hospital. |

=== Reformed churches ===
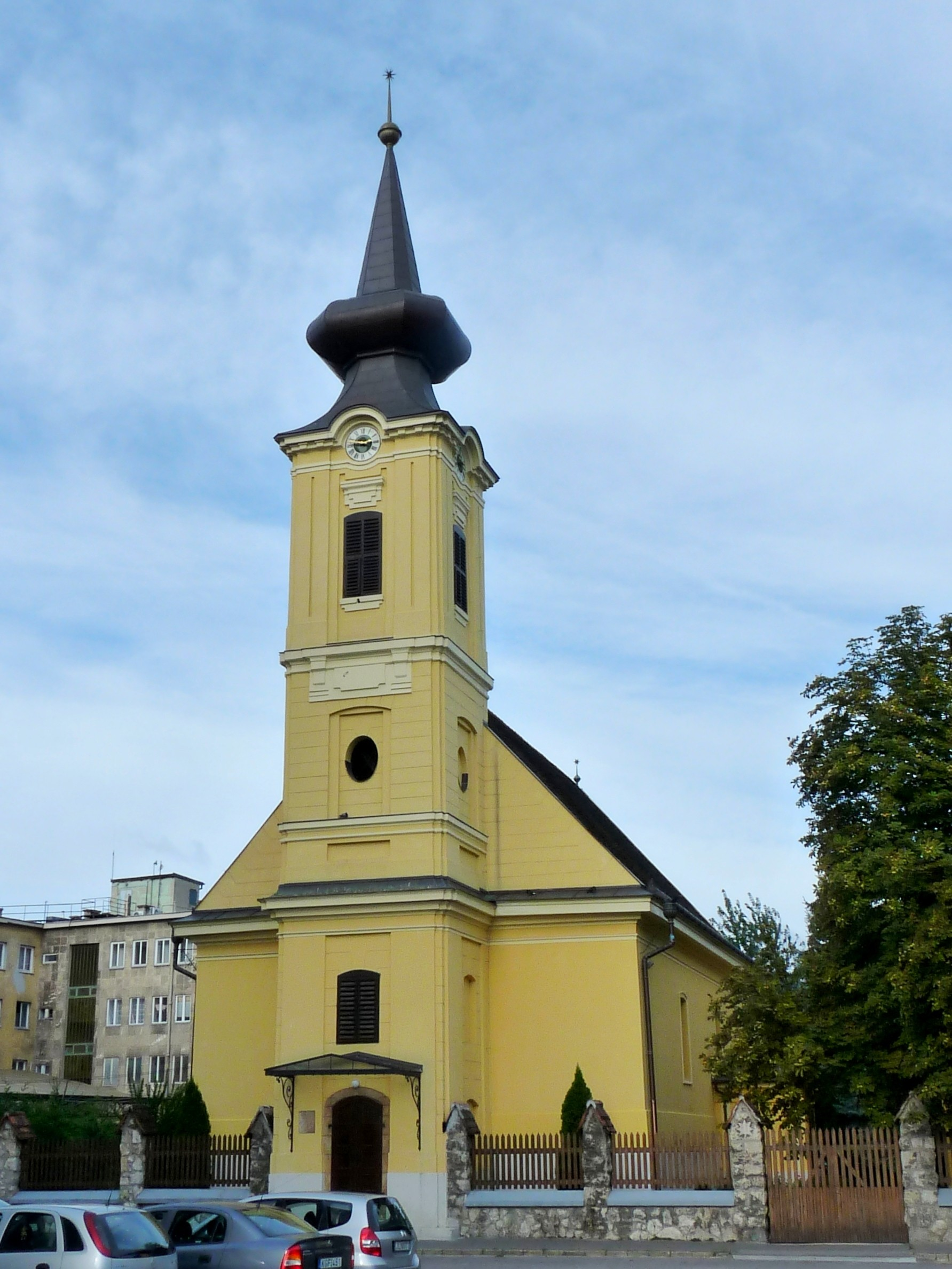
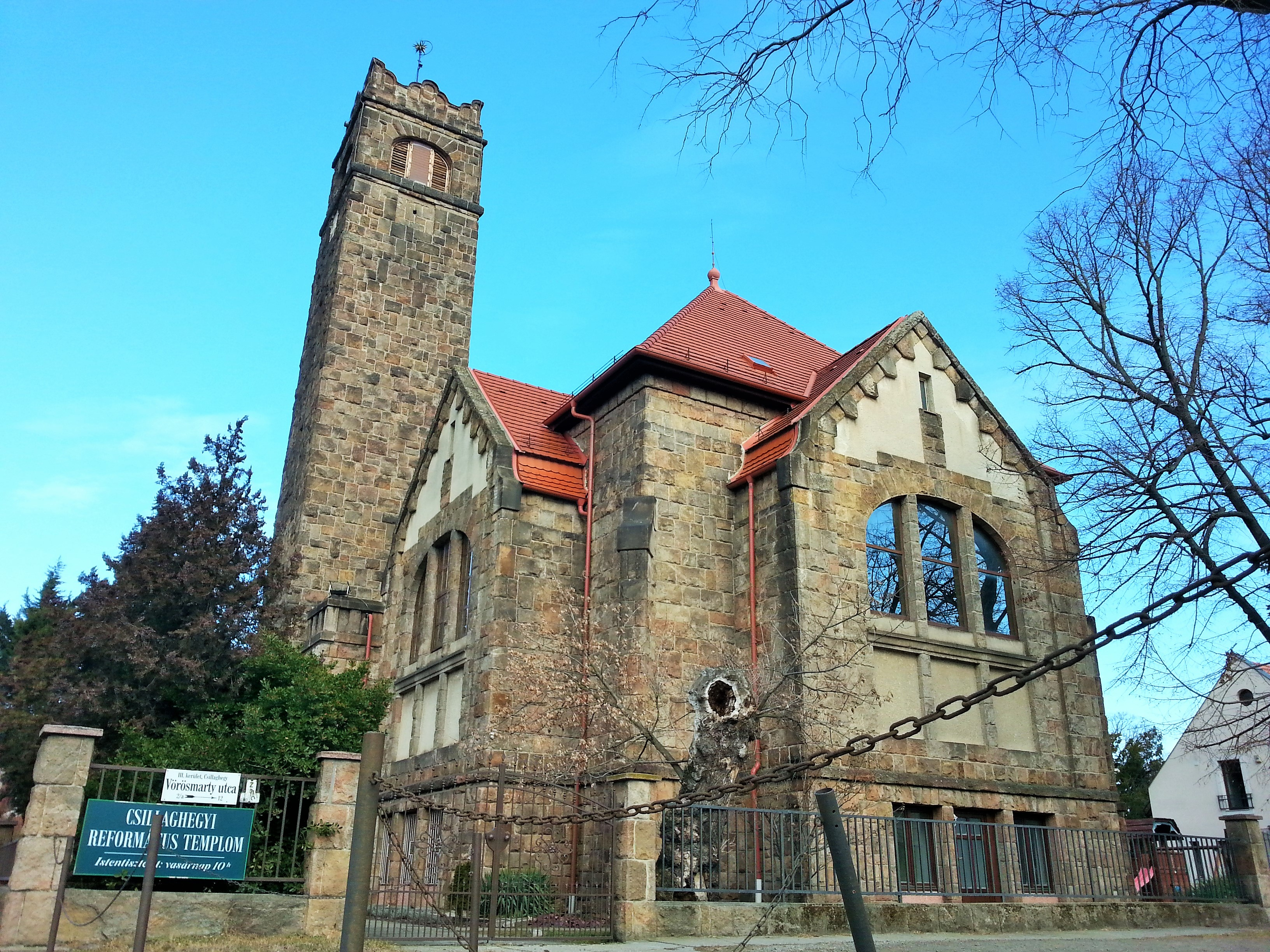
| Picture | Name | Construction time | Architectural style | Designer | Address, comments |
|---|---|---|---|---|---|
| | Óbudai református templom | 1785–1786 | copf (late baroque) | n. a. | 1033 Budapest, Kálvin köz 4. |
| | Csillaghegyi református templom | 1926–1941 | Hungarian folk (?) | Szántay Endre | 1039 Budapest, Vörösmarty u. 2. |

=== Evangelical churches ===
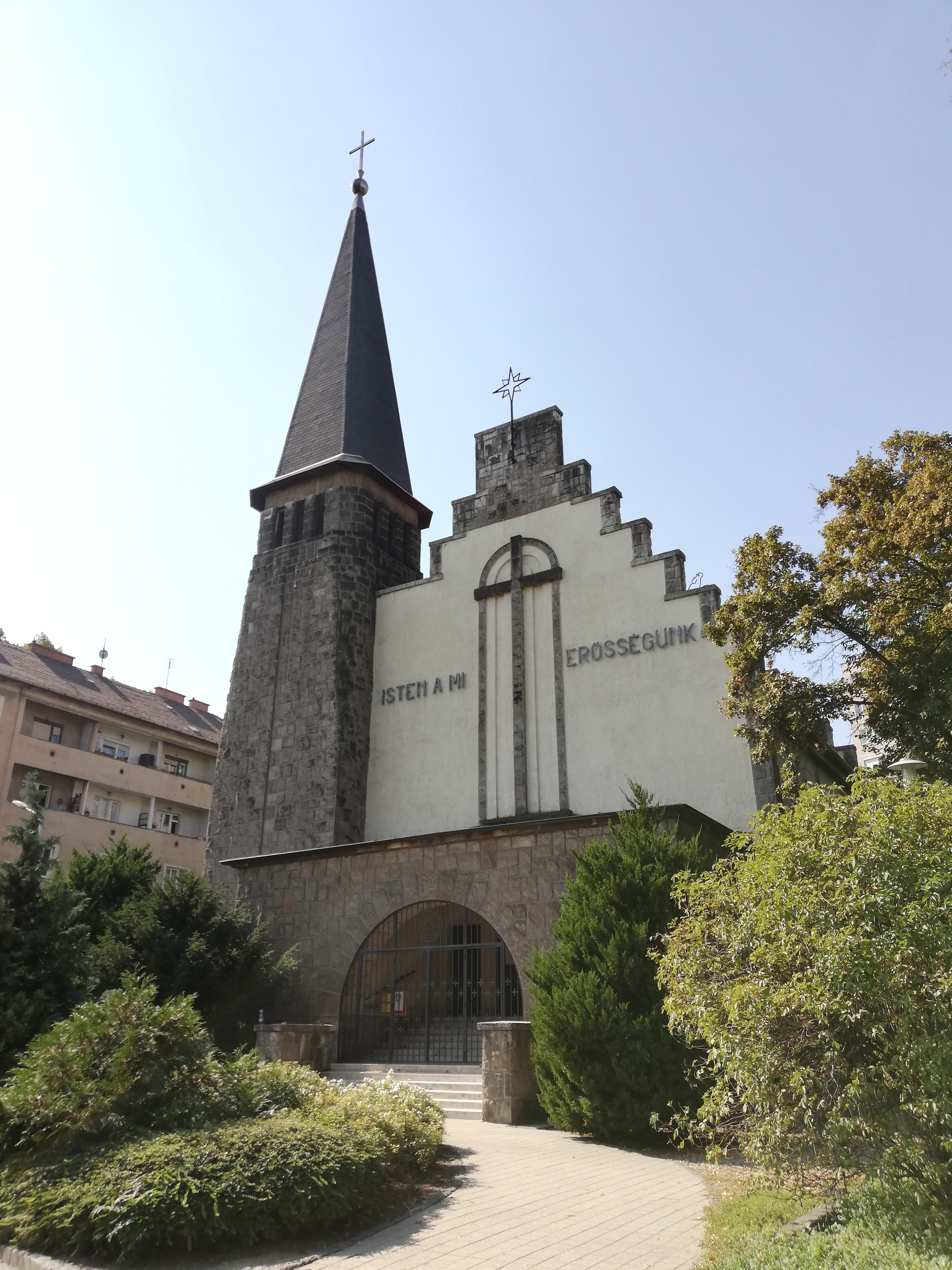
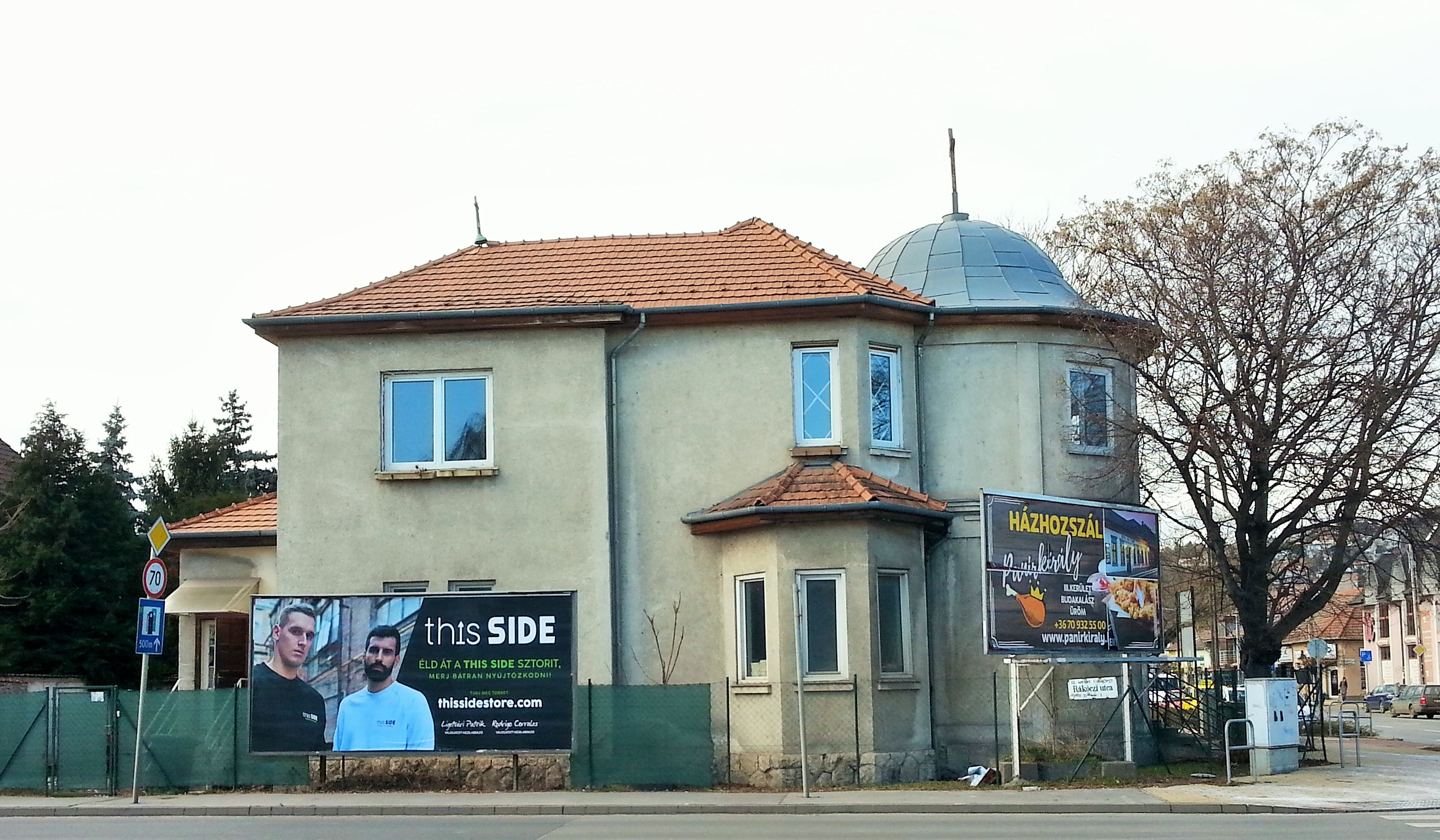
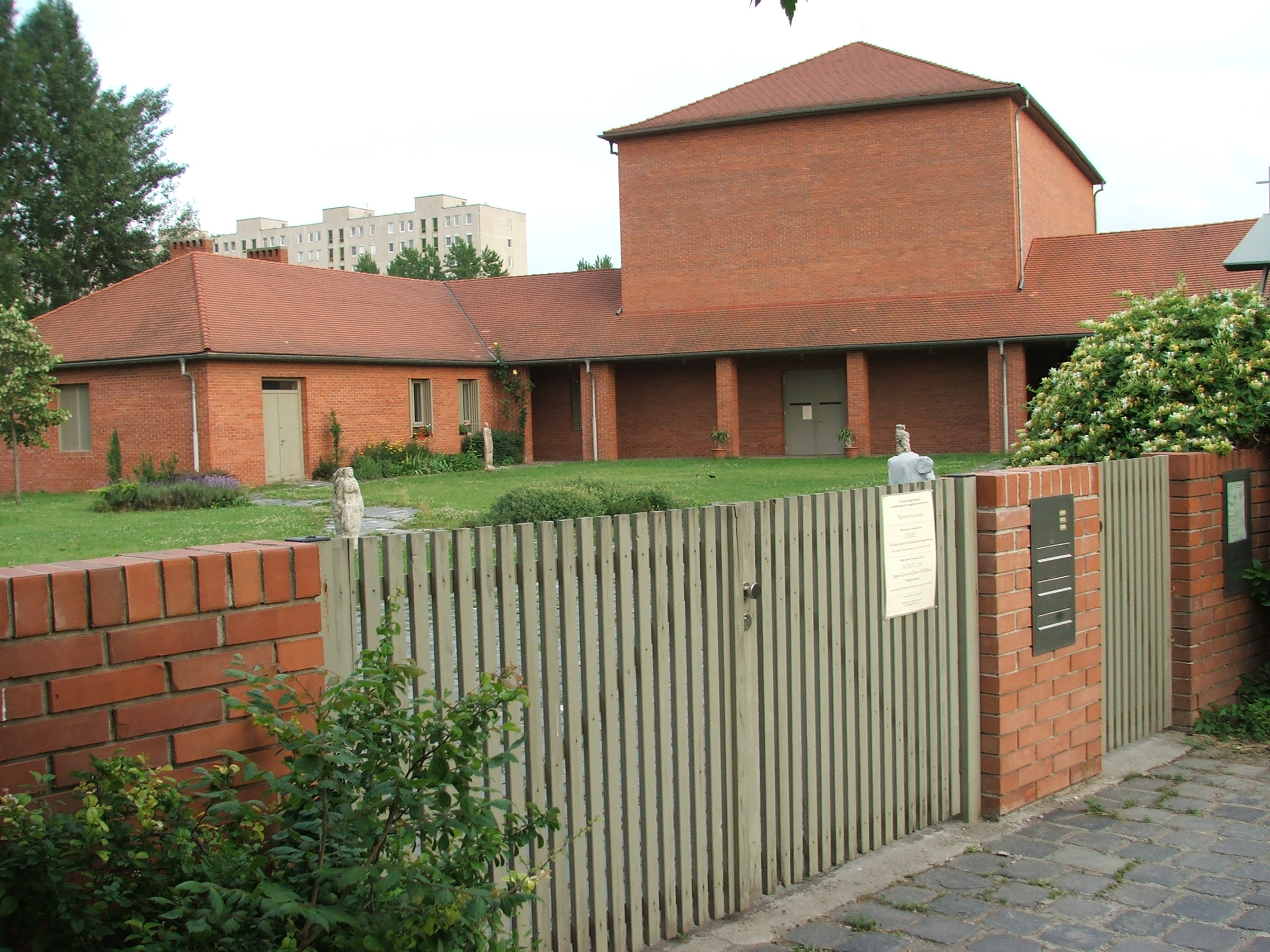
| Picture | Name | Construction time | Architectural style | Designer | Address, comments |
|---|---|---|---|---|---|
| | Óbudai evangélikus templom | 1935 | Hungarian folk | Friedrich Lóránt | 1034 Budapest, Dévai Bíró Mátyás tér 1. |
| | Csillaghegyi régi evangélikus templom | before 1935 | neoclassicist (?) | n. a. | 1039 Budapest, Rákóczi u. 1. A helyi gyülekezet 1935-ben egy üdülőnek épült villát vásárolt a Mátyás Király úton, melyet Raffay Sándor püspök szentelt fel. |
| | Csillaghegyi új evangélikus templom | 1999–2000 | modern | Pazár Béla építész és az MNDP Építőművész Kft. | 1038 Budapest, Mező u. 12. |

=== Other churches ===
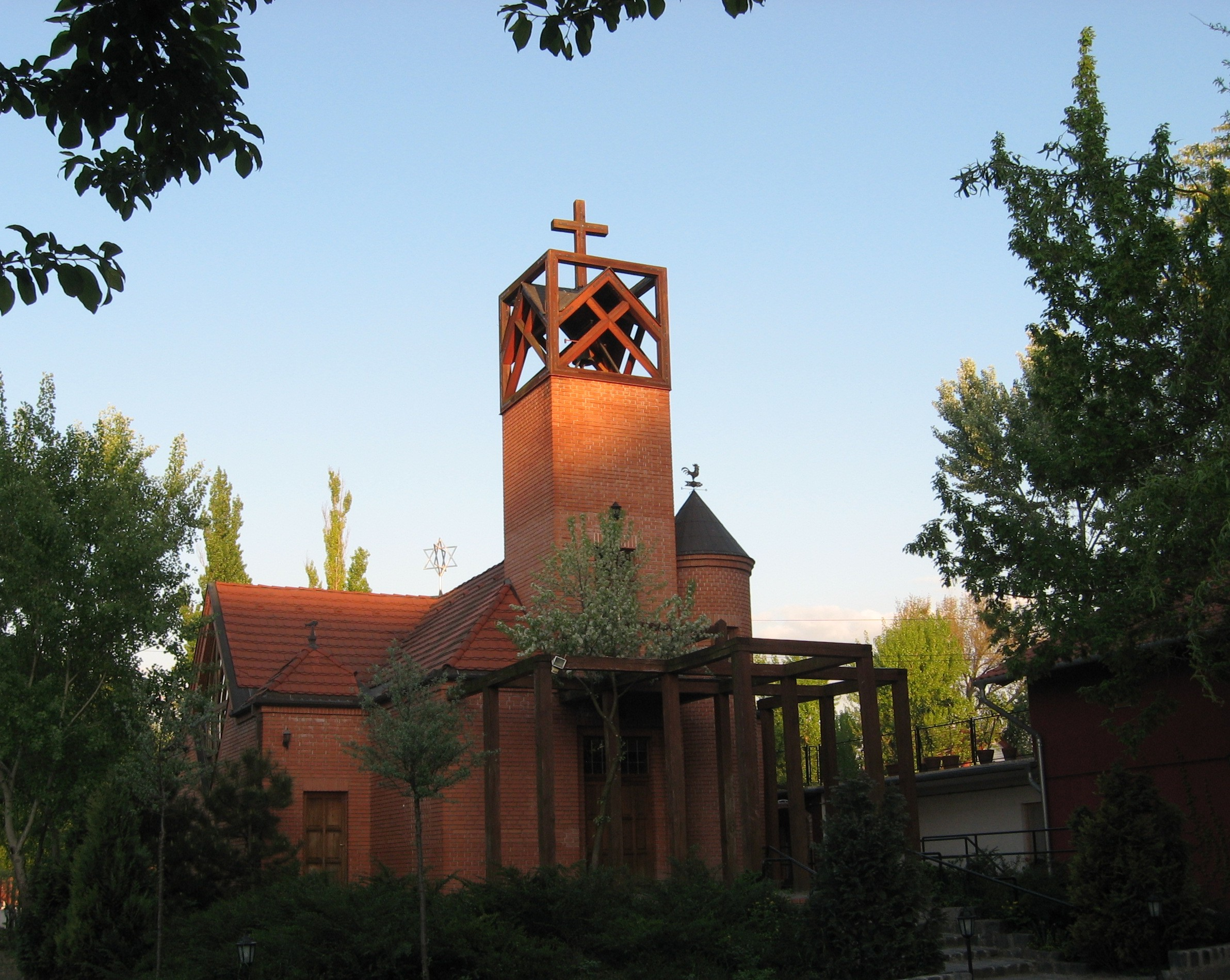
| Picture | Name | Construction time | Architectural style | Designer | Address, comments |
|---|---|---|---|---|---|
| | House of Reconciliation (A Megbékélés Háza) | 1992–1998 | modern | Nagy Bálint és Társai tervező irodája | 1039 Budapest, Királyok útja 297. A Magyarországi Evangéliumi Testvérközösség temploma. |

== District IV ==
=== Roman Catholic churches ===
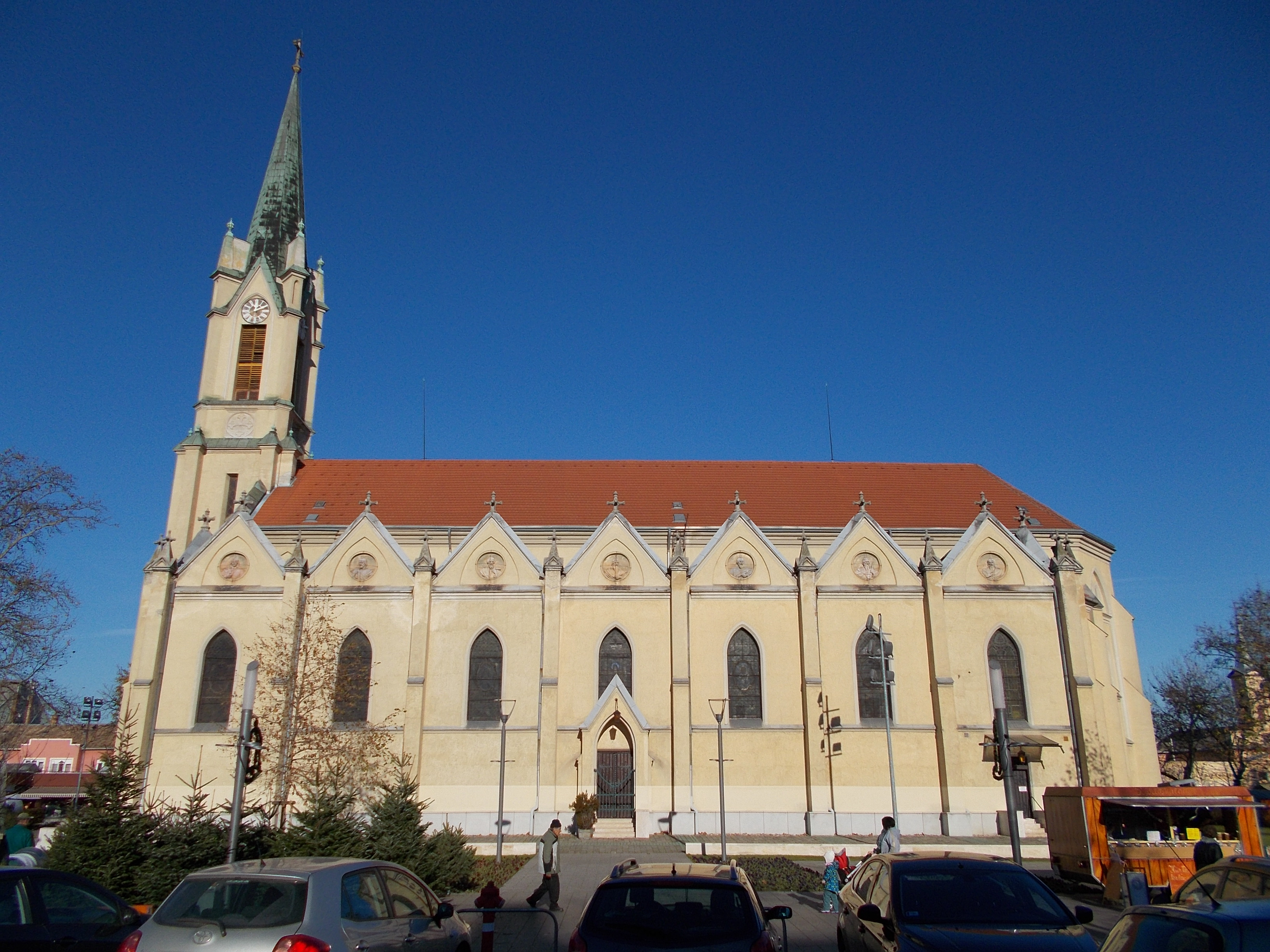
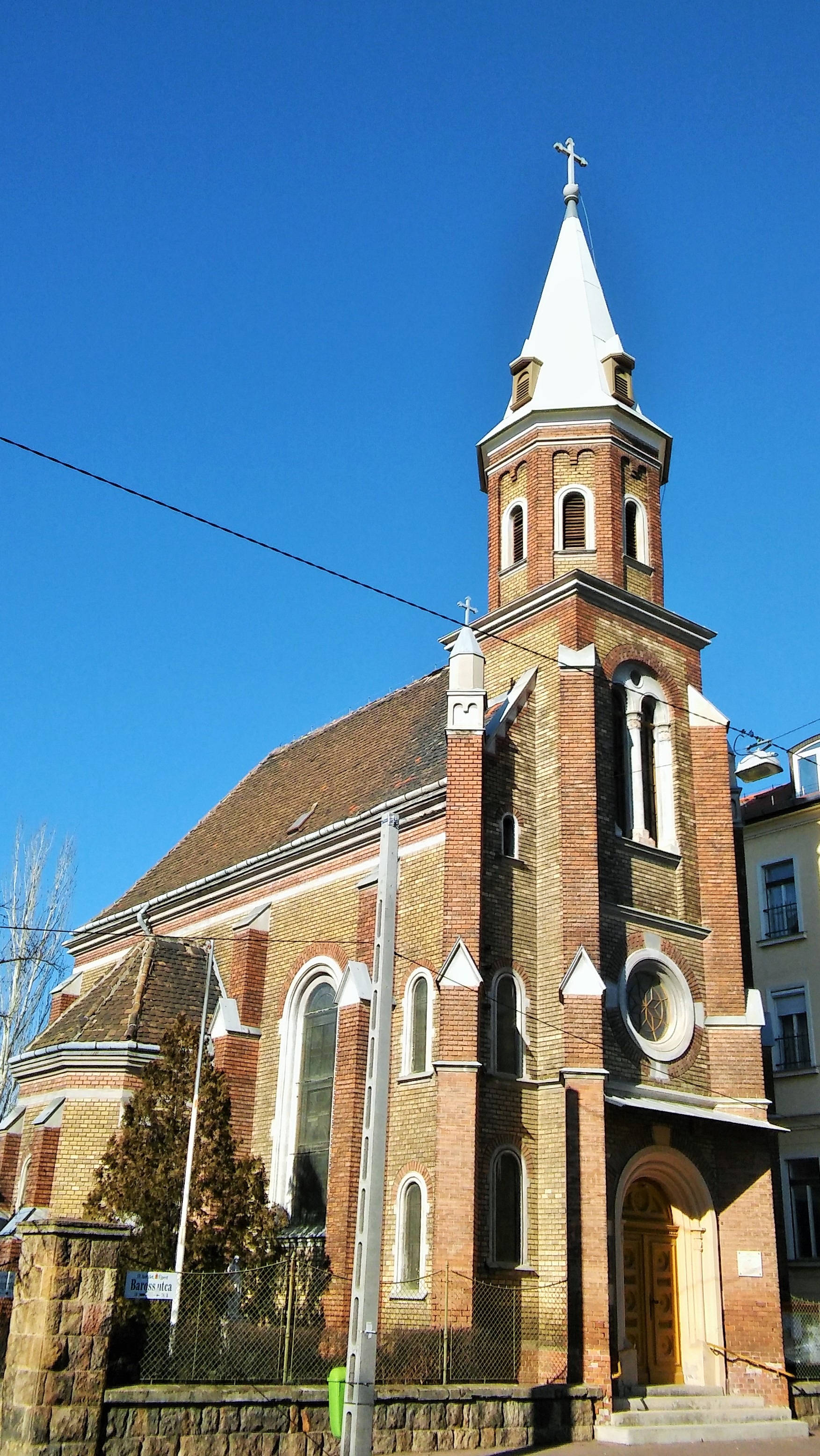
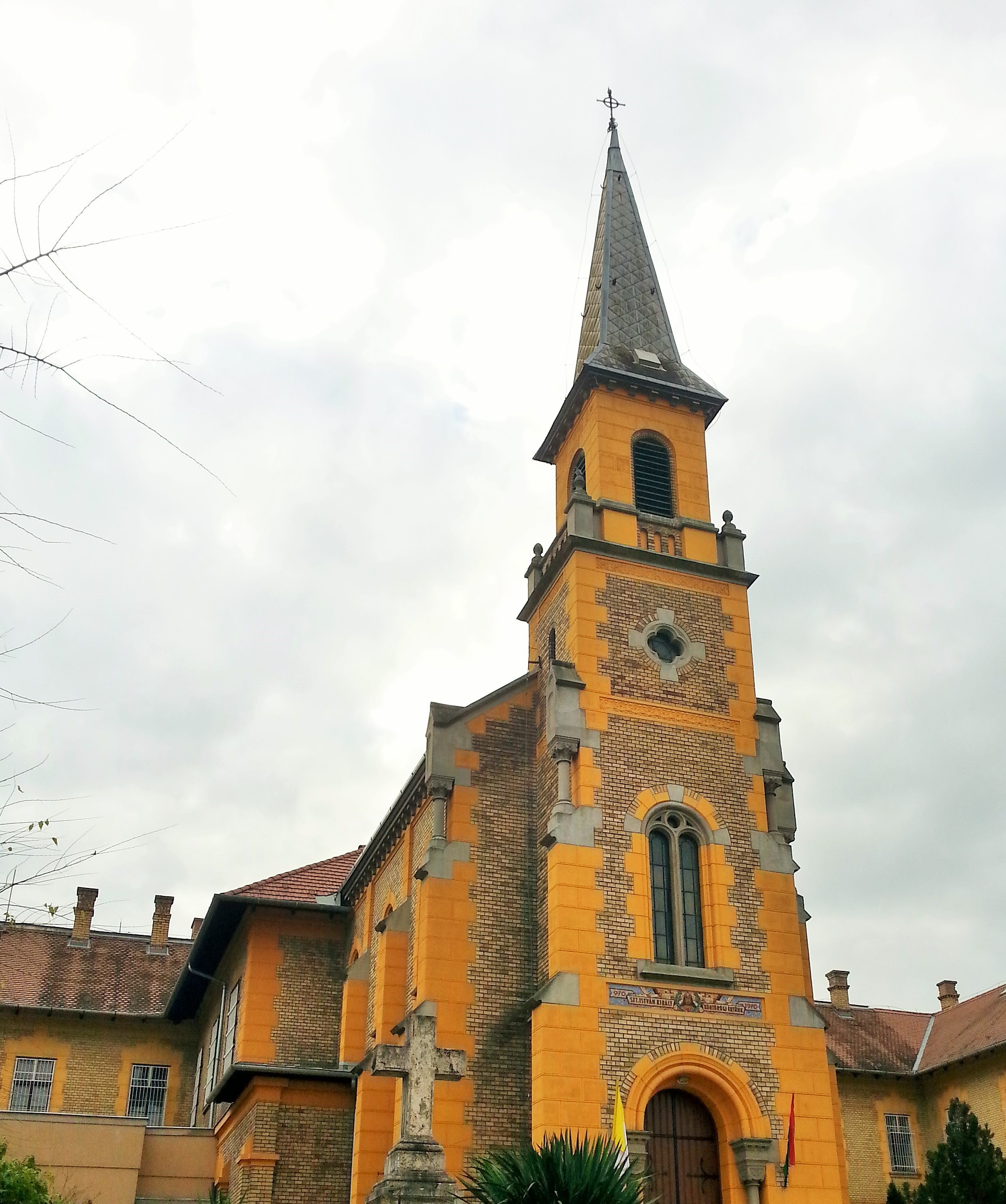
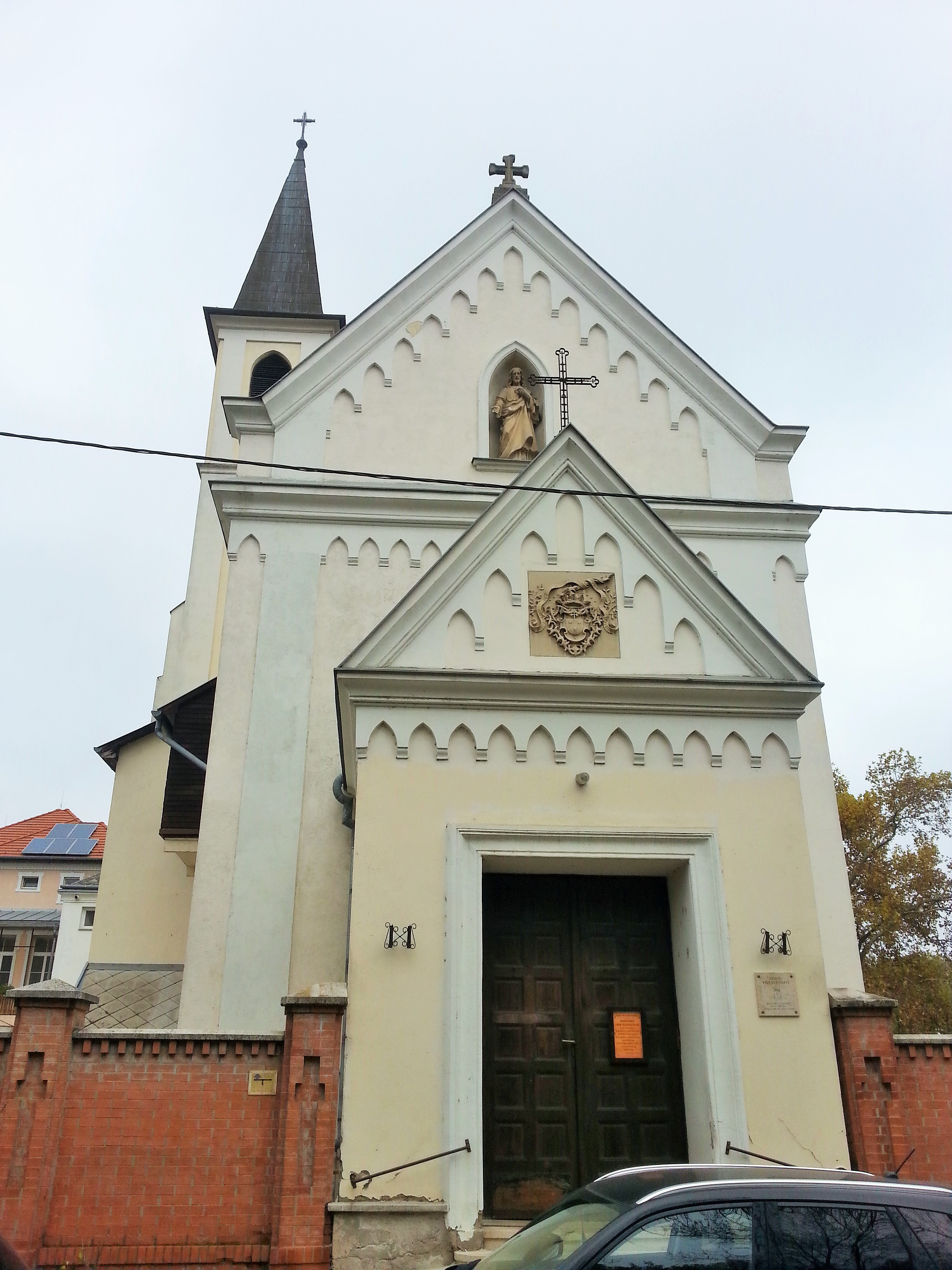
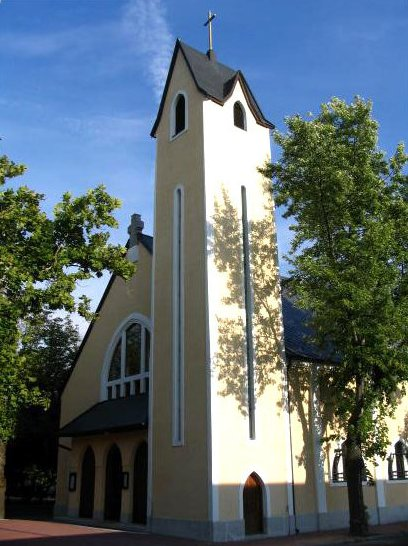
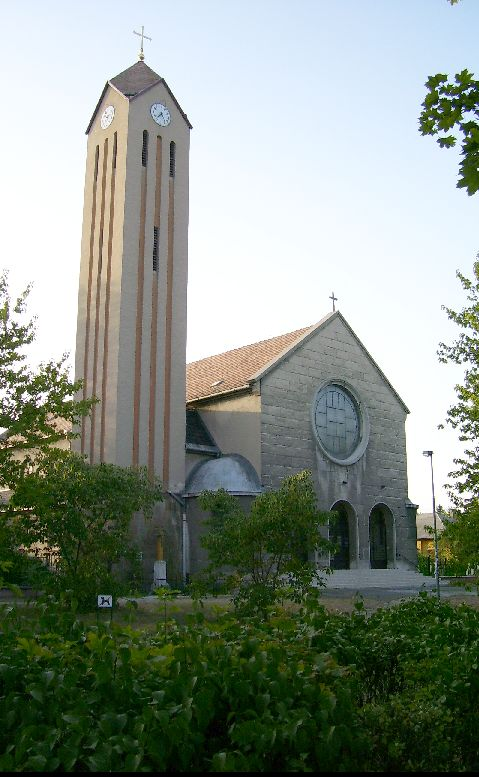
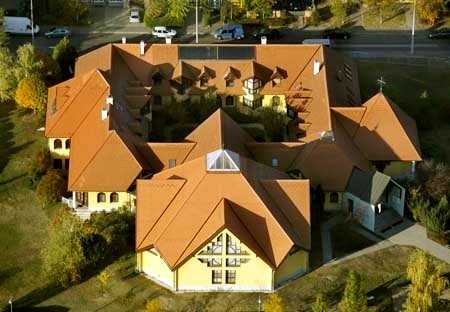
| Picture | Name | Construction time | Architectural style | Designer | Address, comments |
|---|---|---|---|---|---|
| | Egek Királynéja-templom | 1875–1881 | neogothic | n. a. | 1041 Budapest, Szent István tér 13. |
| | Újpesti Jézus Szíve templom (Baross utcai templom) | 1886 | neogothic | Károly Bachmann | 1047 Budapest, Baross u. 70. |
| | Szent István Király templom | 1888 | neogothic | Ybl Miklós | 1045 Budapest, Árpád. u. 199. |
| | Újpesti Nagyboldogasszony-templom | 1928 | neo-romantic (?) | Bruno Buchwieser | 1044 Budapest, Anscher Lipót tér 10. |
| | Újpest Szent József templom (Nap utcai templom) | 1934 | n. a. | n. a. | 1045 Budapest, Nap u. 14. |
| | Szent István király-templom | 1942–1946 | neo-romanesque | n. a. | 1046 Budapest, Rákóczi tér 4–8. |
| | Káposztásmegyeri Szentháromság templom | 1991–1995 | modern | B. Greskovics Klára, Becker Gábor | 1046 Budapest, Tóth Aladár u. 2. |

=== Reformed churches ===
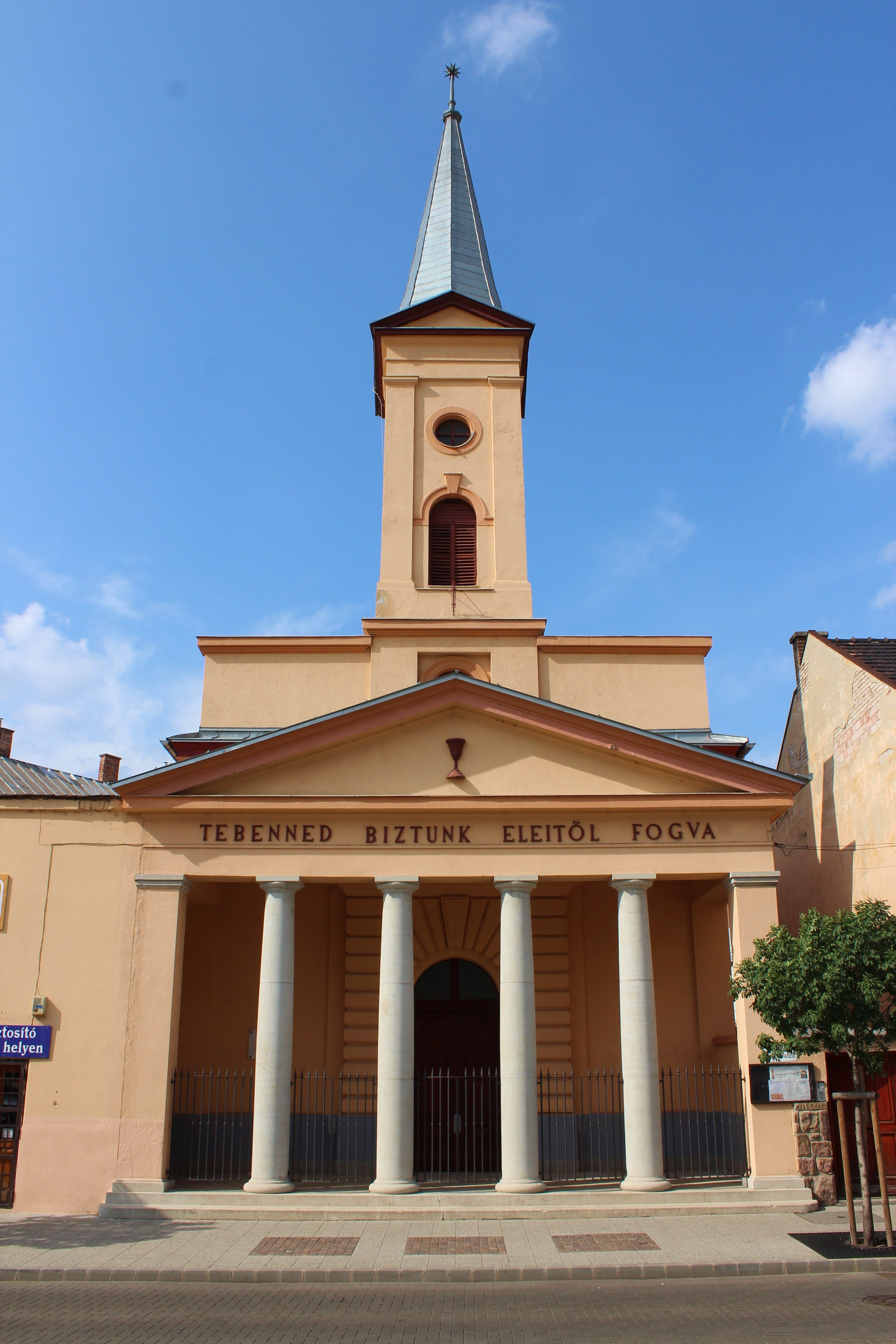
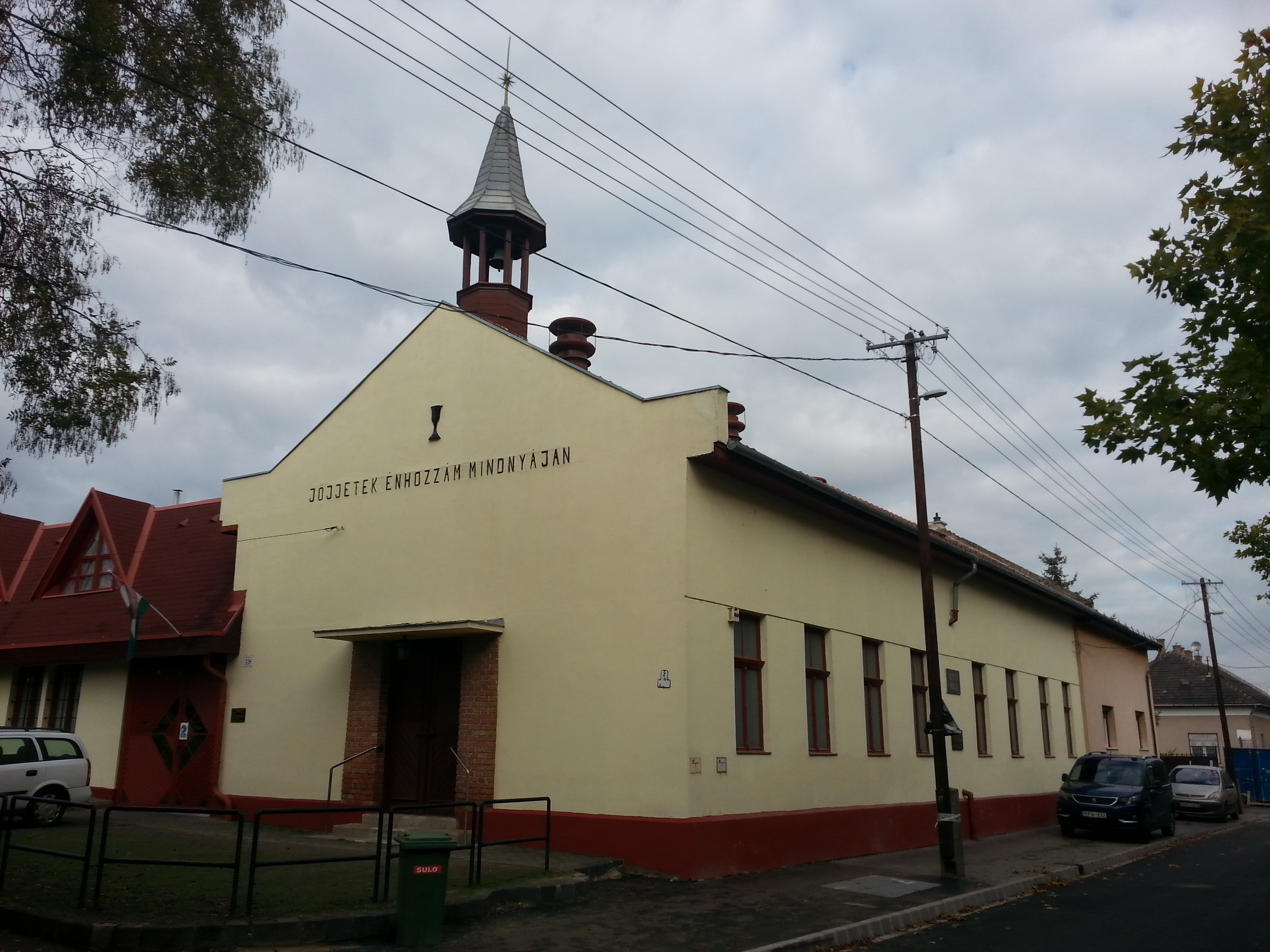
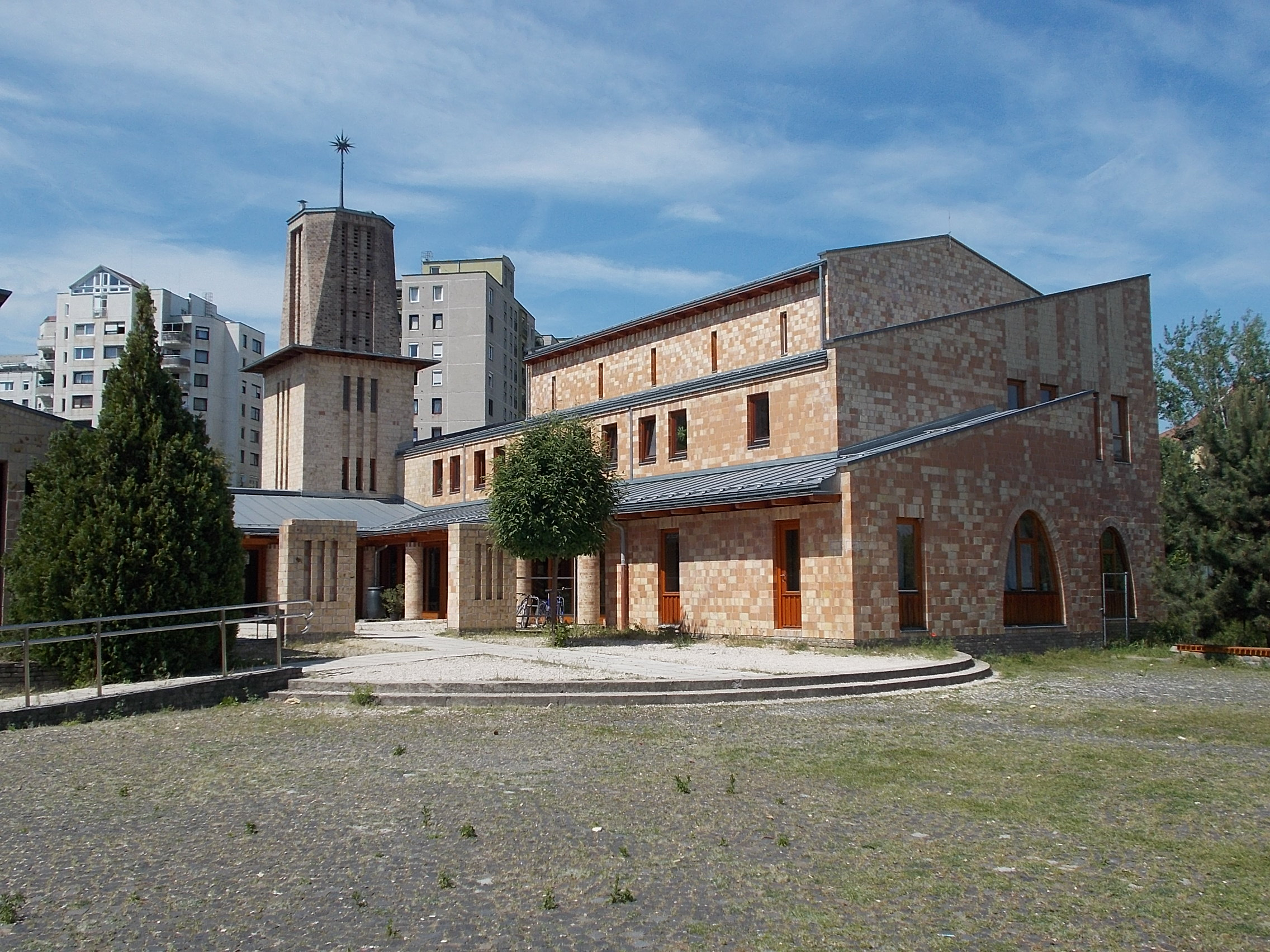
| Picture | Name | Construction time | Architectural style | Designer | Address, comments |
|---|---|---|---|---|---|
| | Újpest-Belsővárosi református templom | 1878 | neoclassicist (?) | n. a. | 1041 Budapest, Szent István tér 24. |
| | Újpest-Újvárosi református templom | 1944 előtt | n. a. | n. a. | 1047 Budapest, Attila u. 118. The house, which was inherited, was converted into a church between 1944 and 1947. |
| | Káposztásmegyeri református templom | 2001–2011 | modern | n. a. | 1048 Budapest, Bőröndös u. 17. |

=== Evangelical churches ===
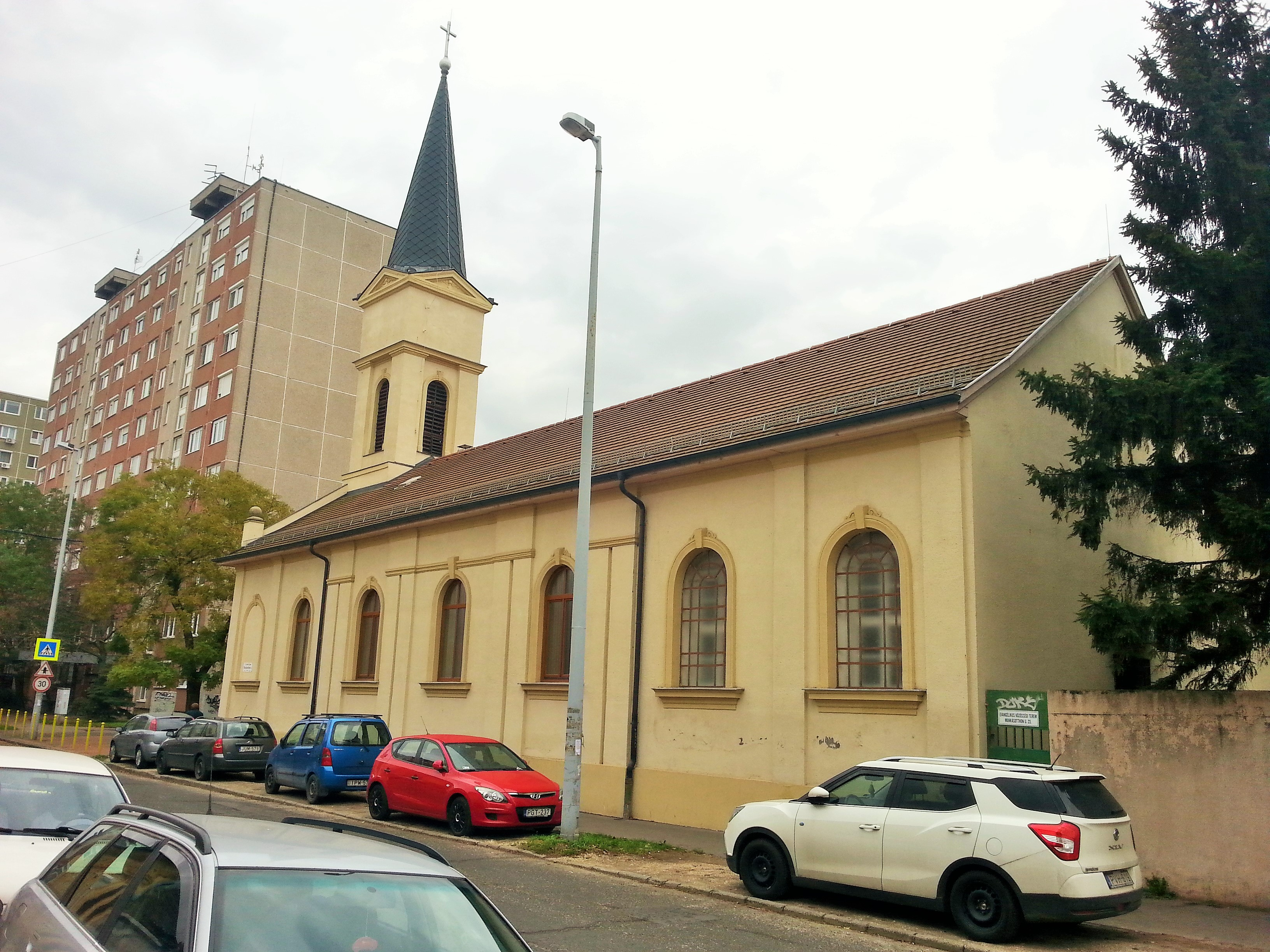
| Picture | Name | Construction time | Architectural style | Designer | Address, comments |
|---|---|---|---|---|---|
| | Újpesti evangélikus templom | 1873–1875 | eclectic | Lajos Kósa | 1043 Budapest, Lebstück Mária u. 36–38. |

=== Other churches ===
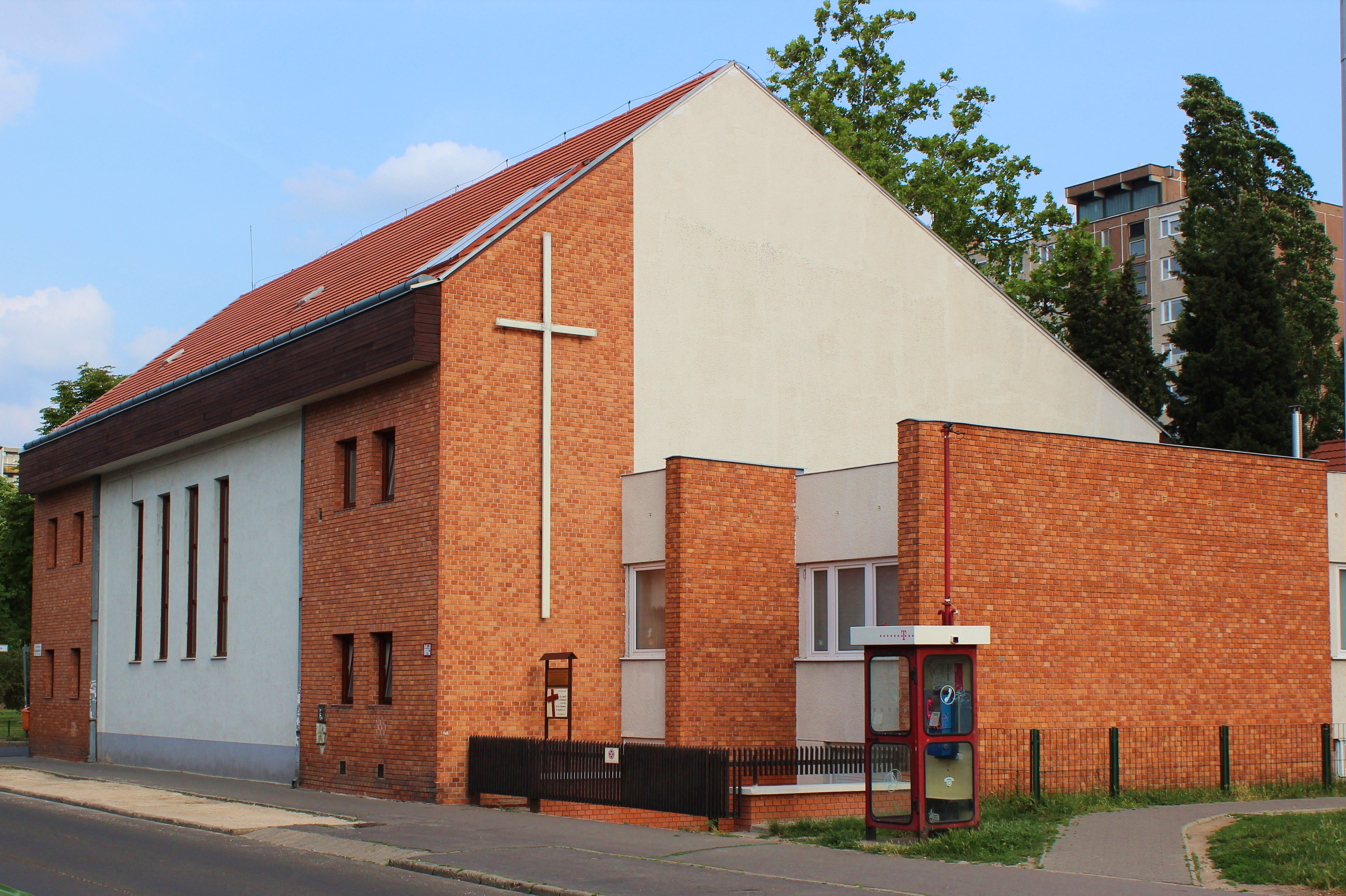
| Picture | Name | Construction time | Architectural style | Designer | Address, comments |
|---|---|---|---|---|---|
| | Újpesti baptista templom | n. a. | n. a. | n. a. | 1043 Budapest, Kassai u. 26. |
| | Újpesti Adventista Gyülekezet imaház | 20th century | n. a. | n. a. | 1048 Budapest, Kordován tér 10. |
| | Újpesti Új Élet Gyülekezet temploma | 20th century | n. a. | n. a. | 1043 Budapest, Virág u. 26. |

== District V ==
=== Roman Catholic churches ===
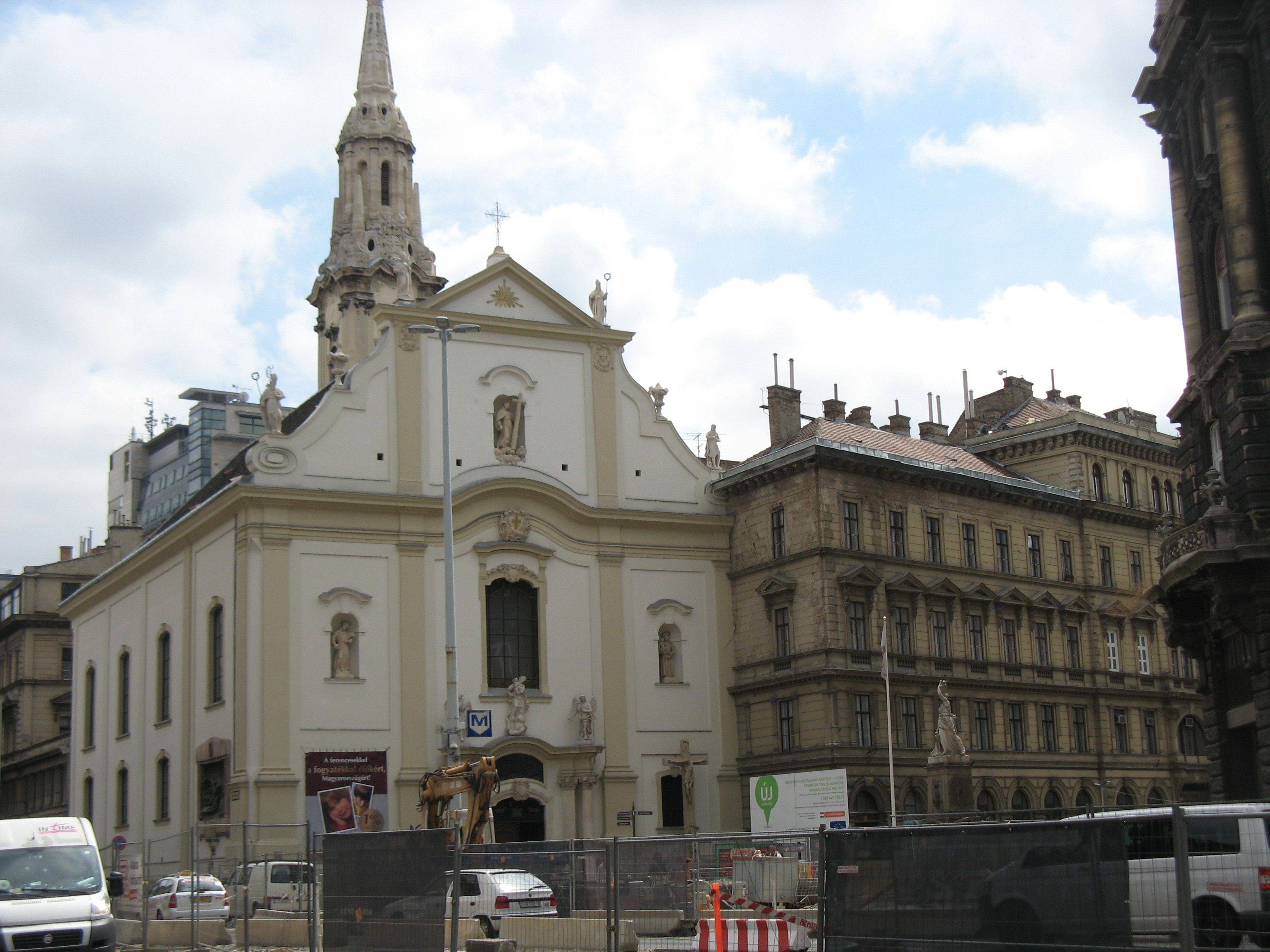
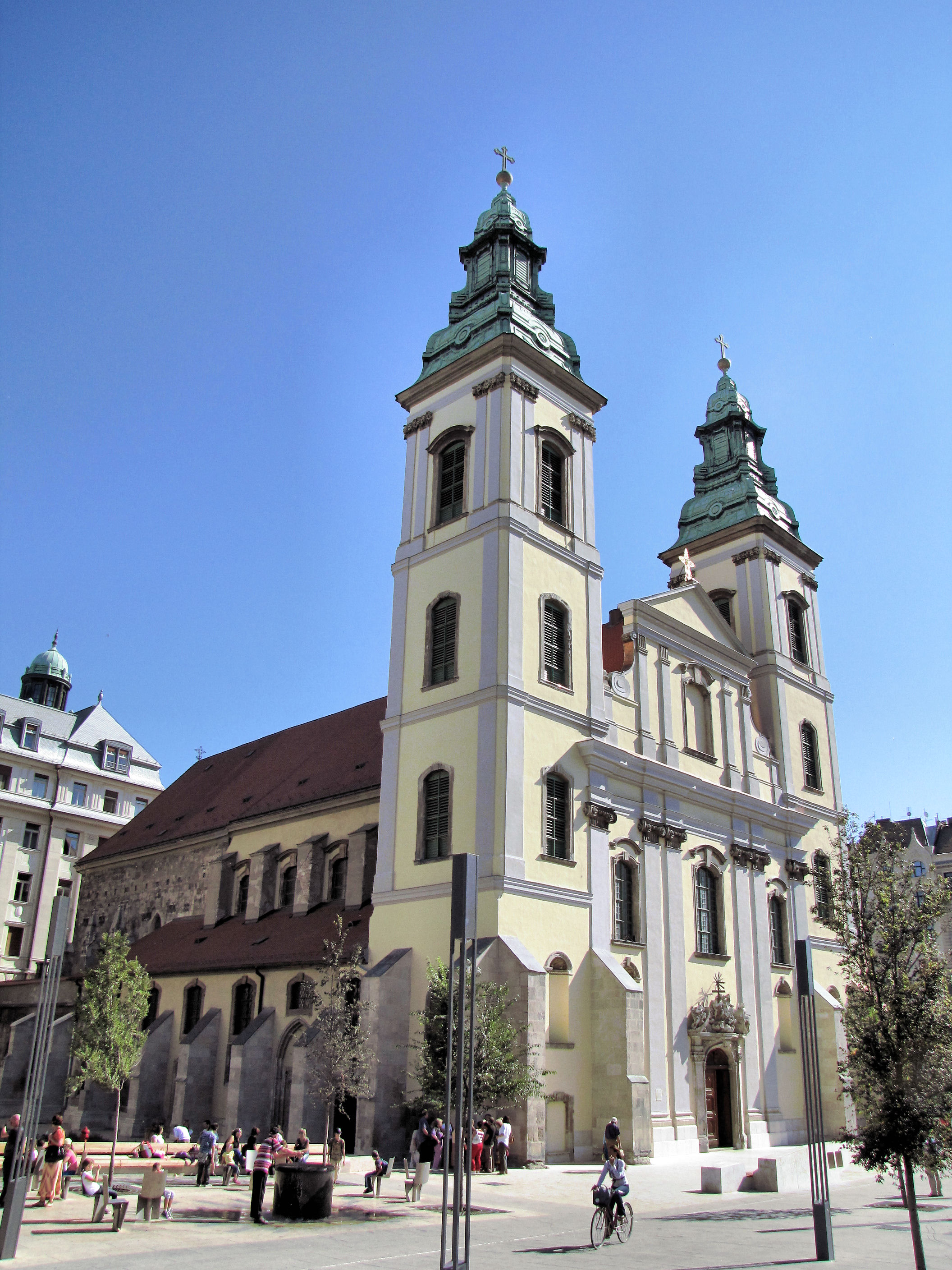
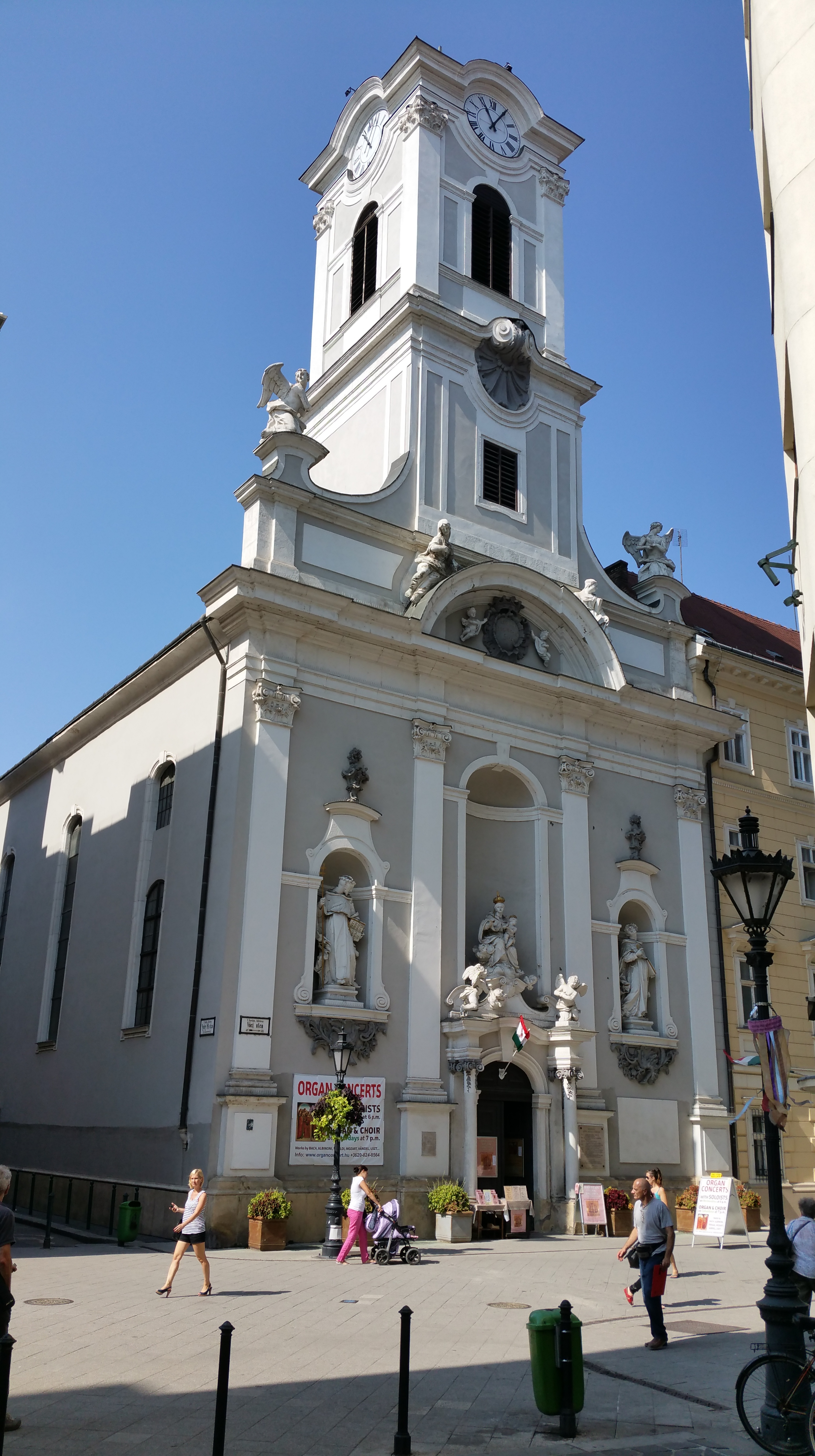
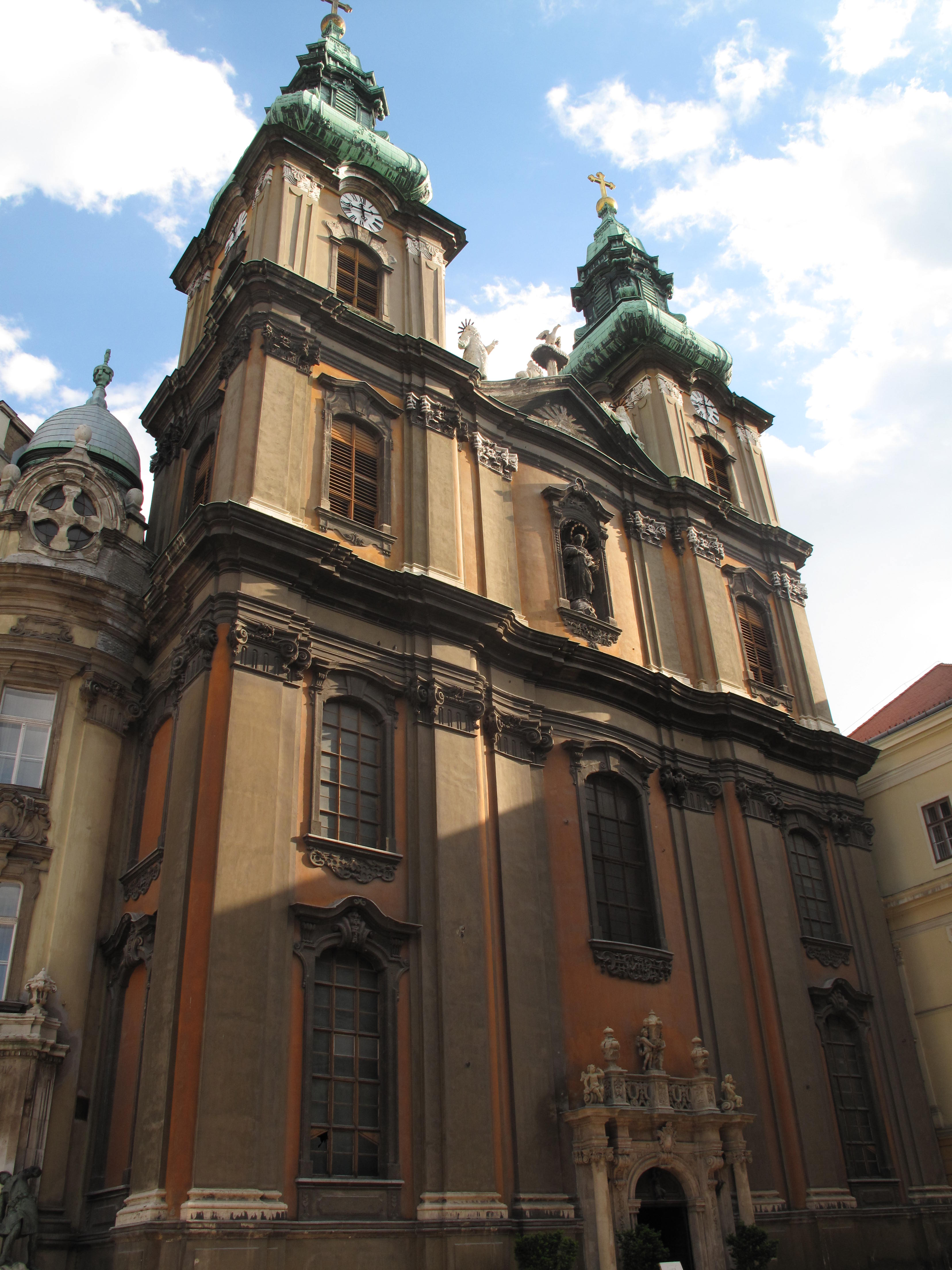
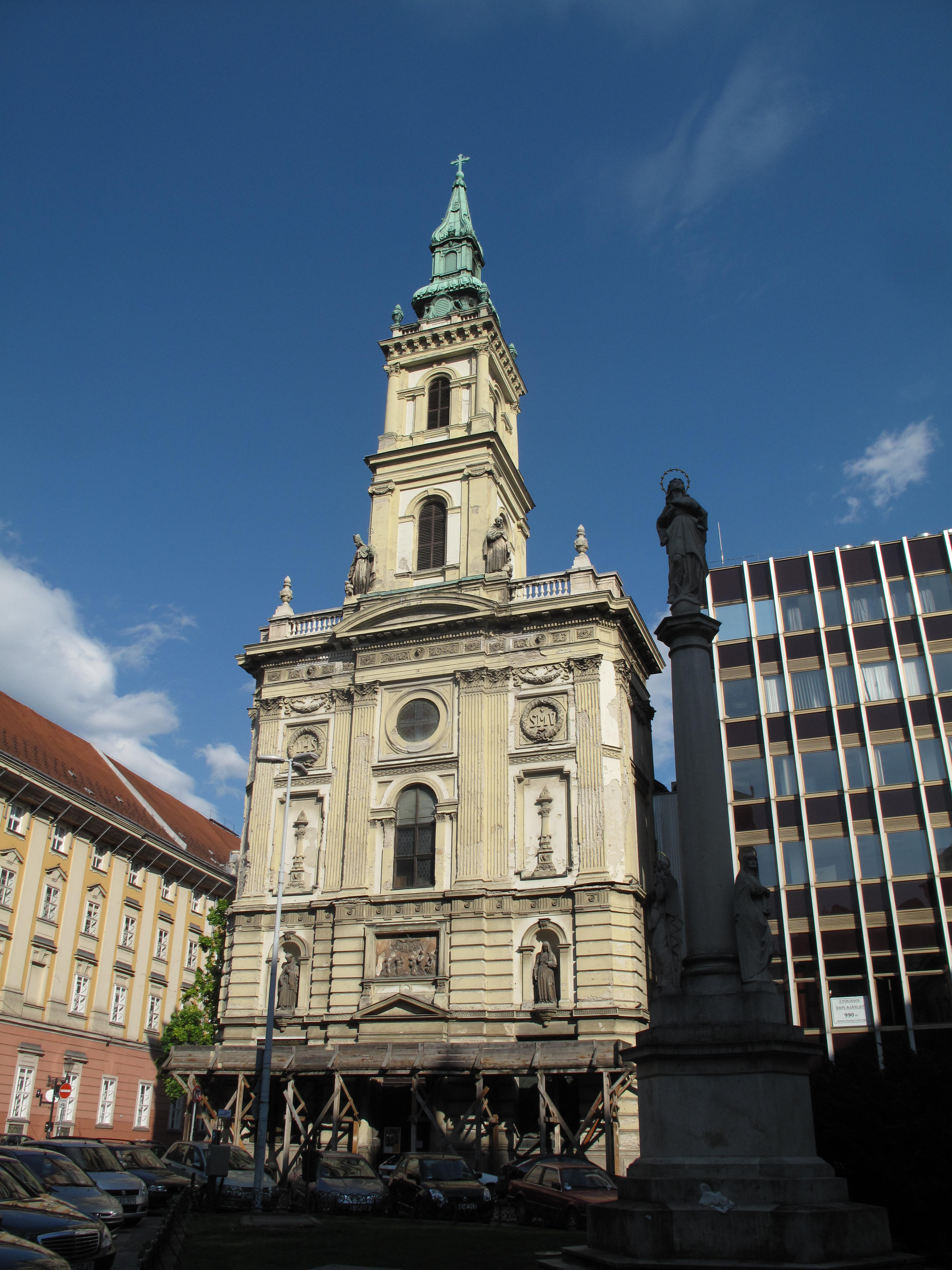
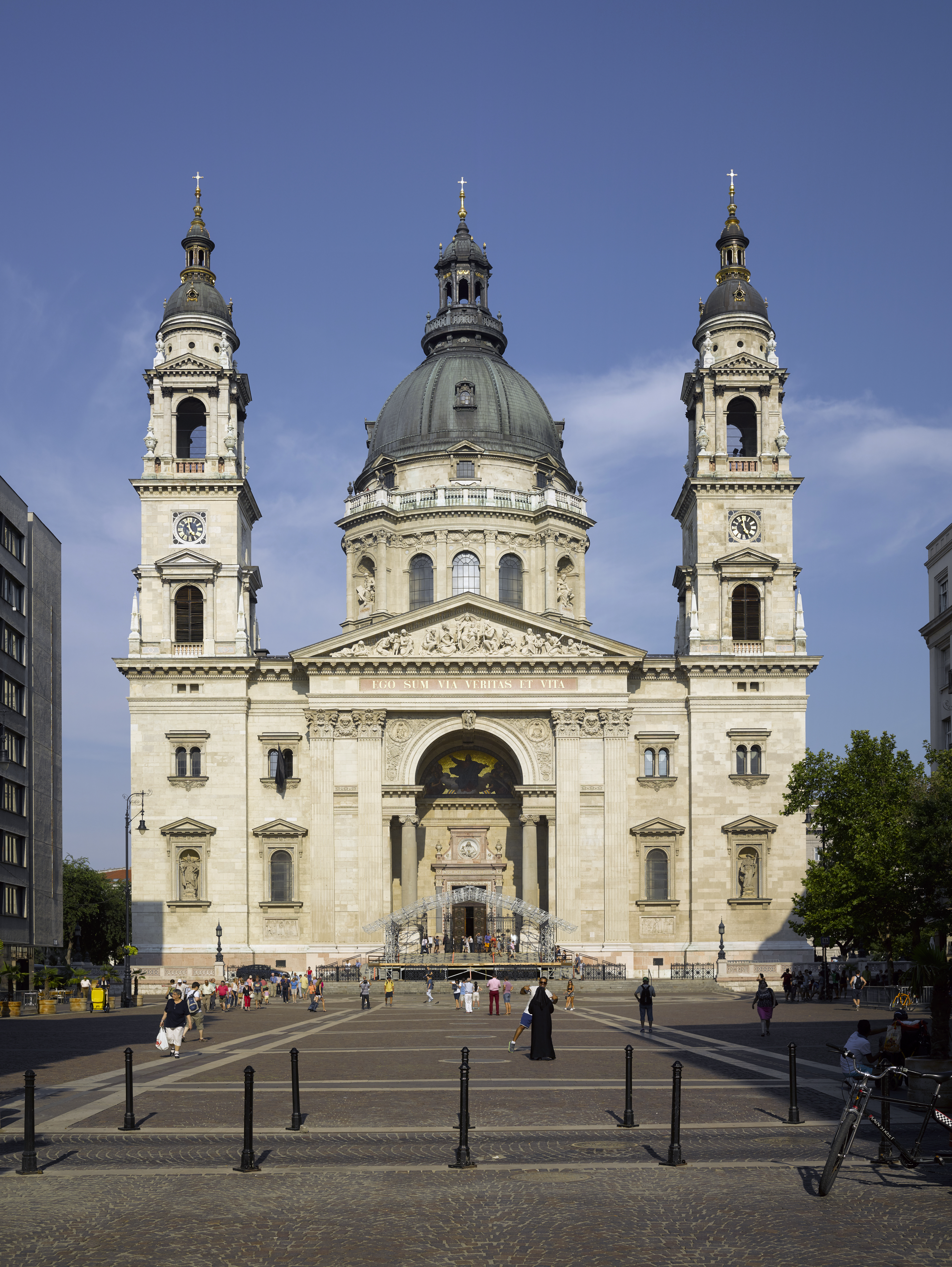
| Picture | Name | Construction time | Architectural style | Designer | Address, comments |
|---|---|---|---|---|---|
| | Alcantarai Szent Péter-templom | after 1241 | baroque (as it is today) | n. a. | 1053 Budapest, Ferenciek tere 9. |
| | Belvárosi plébániatemplom | 14th century | gothic, after baroque | n. a. | 1056 Budapest, Március 15. tér |
| | Szent Mihály-templom (Angolkisasszonyok temploma) | 1747–1749 | baroque | Mayerhoffer András | 1056 Budapest, Váci utca 47/b. |
| | Kisboldogasszony-templom (Egyetemi templom) | 1715–1742 | baroque | valószínűleg Mayerhoffer András | 1053 Budapest, Papnövelde utca 5–7. |
| | Belvárosi Szent Anna-plébániatemplom (Szervita templom) | 1725–1732 | baroque | Hölbling János, Pauer János György | 1052 Budapest, Szervita tér 6. |
| | St. Stephen's Basilica (Szent István-bazilika) | 1851–1906 | neorenaissance | Hild József, Ybl Miklós, Kauser József | 1051 Budapest, Szent István tér 1. |
| | Kalazanci Szent József piarista kápolna | 1917 | neo-baroque | Hültl Dezső | 1052 Budapest, Piarista utca 1. It is located in the Piarist Monastery. |

=== Reformed churches ===
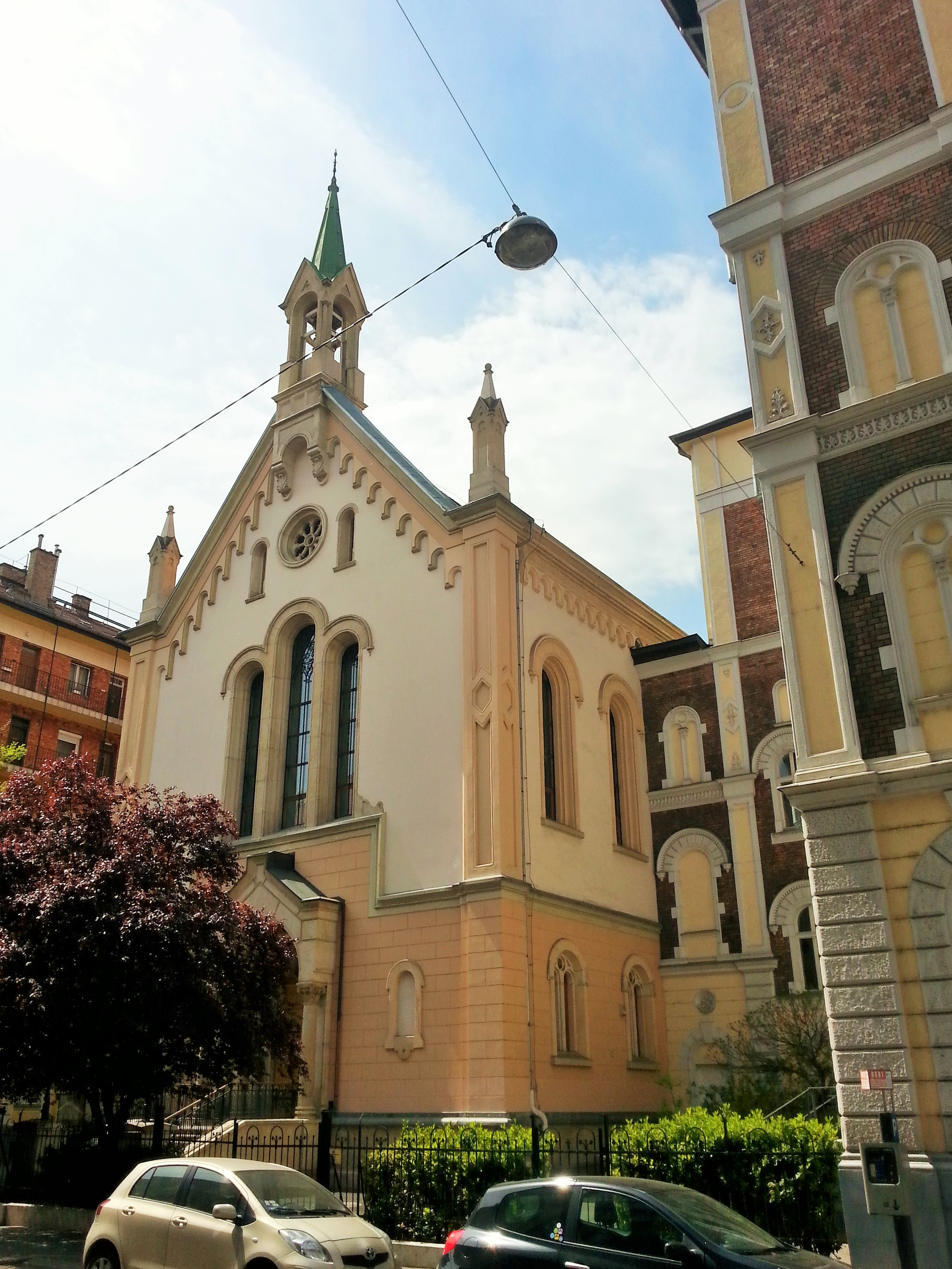
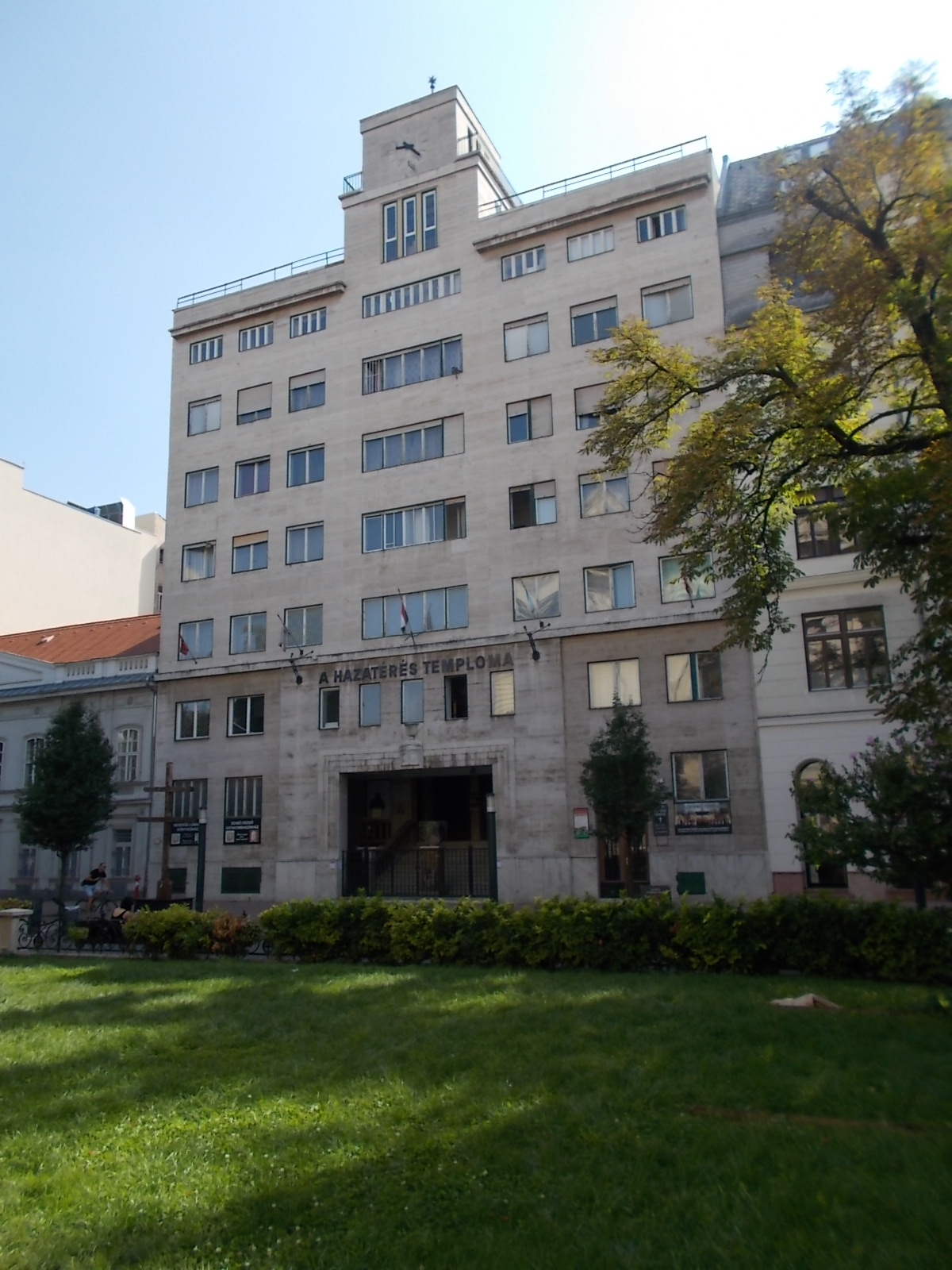
| Picture | Name | Construction time | Architectural style | Designer | Address, comments |
|---|---|---|---|---|---|
| | Budapesti Németajkú Református Egyházközség temploma | 1878 | neogothic | Ray Rezső Lajos | 1054 Budapest, Hold u. 18–20. |
| | A hazatérés temploma | 1939–1940 | bauhaus | Dabasi Halász Géza, Győry Sándor | 1051 Budapest, Szabadság tér 2. Located at the bottom of an apartment building. |

=== Evangelical churches ===
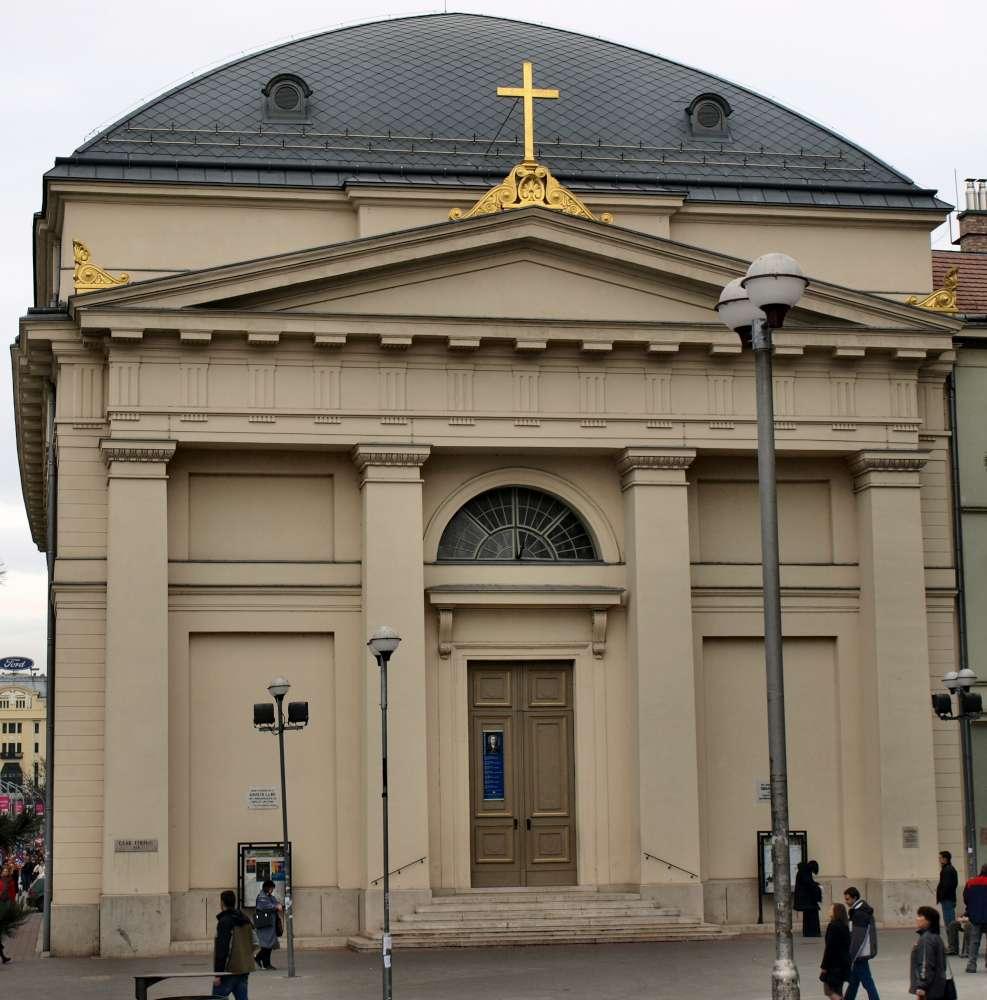
| Picture | Name | Construction time | Architectural style | Designer | Address, comments |
|---|---|---|---|---|---|
| | Deák téri evangélikus templom | 1799–1808 | classicist | Pollack Mihály, Hild József | 1052 Budapest, Deák tér 4. |

=== Unitarian churches ===
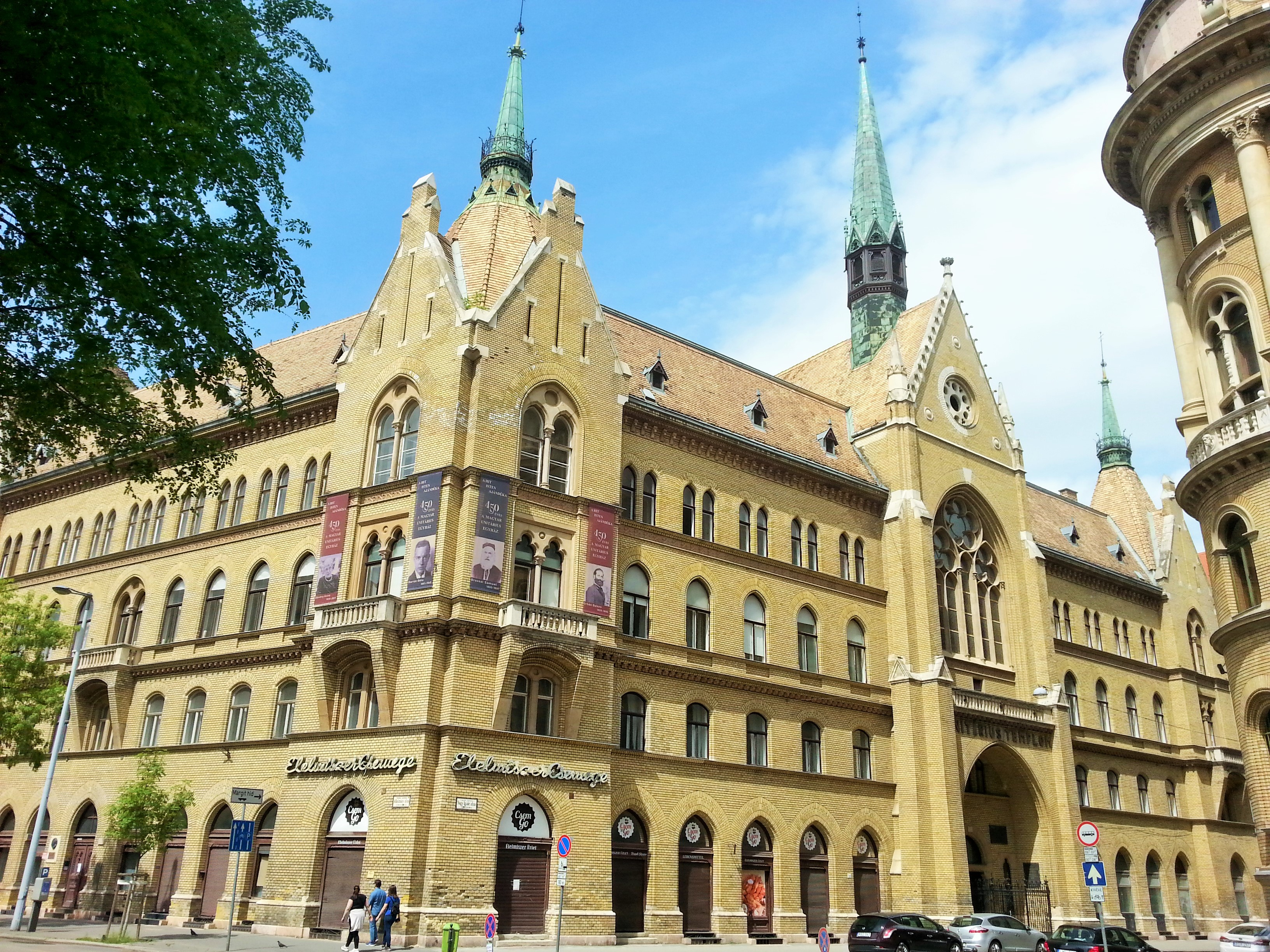
| Picture | Name | Construction time | Architectural style | Designer | Address, comments |
|---|---|---|---|---|---|
| | Budapesti unitárius templom és székház | 1888–1890 | neogothic | Pecz Samu | 1055 Budapest, Nagy Ignác utca 2–4. |

=== Orthodox churches ===
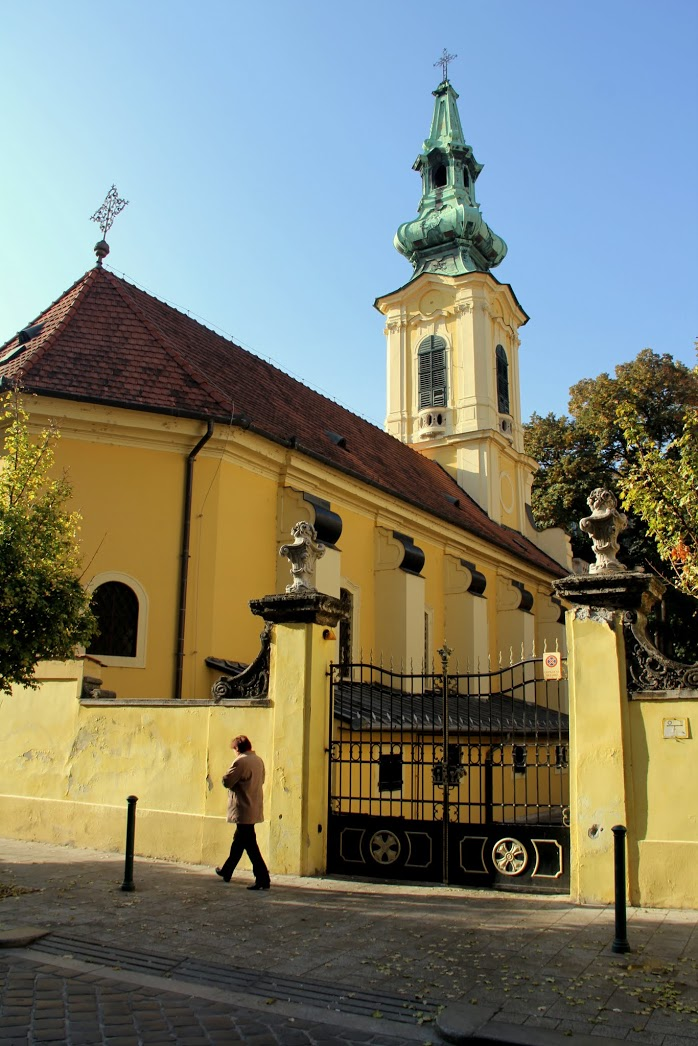
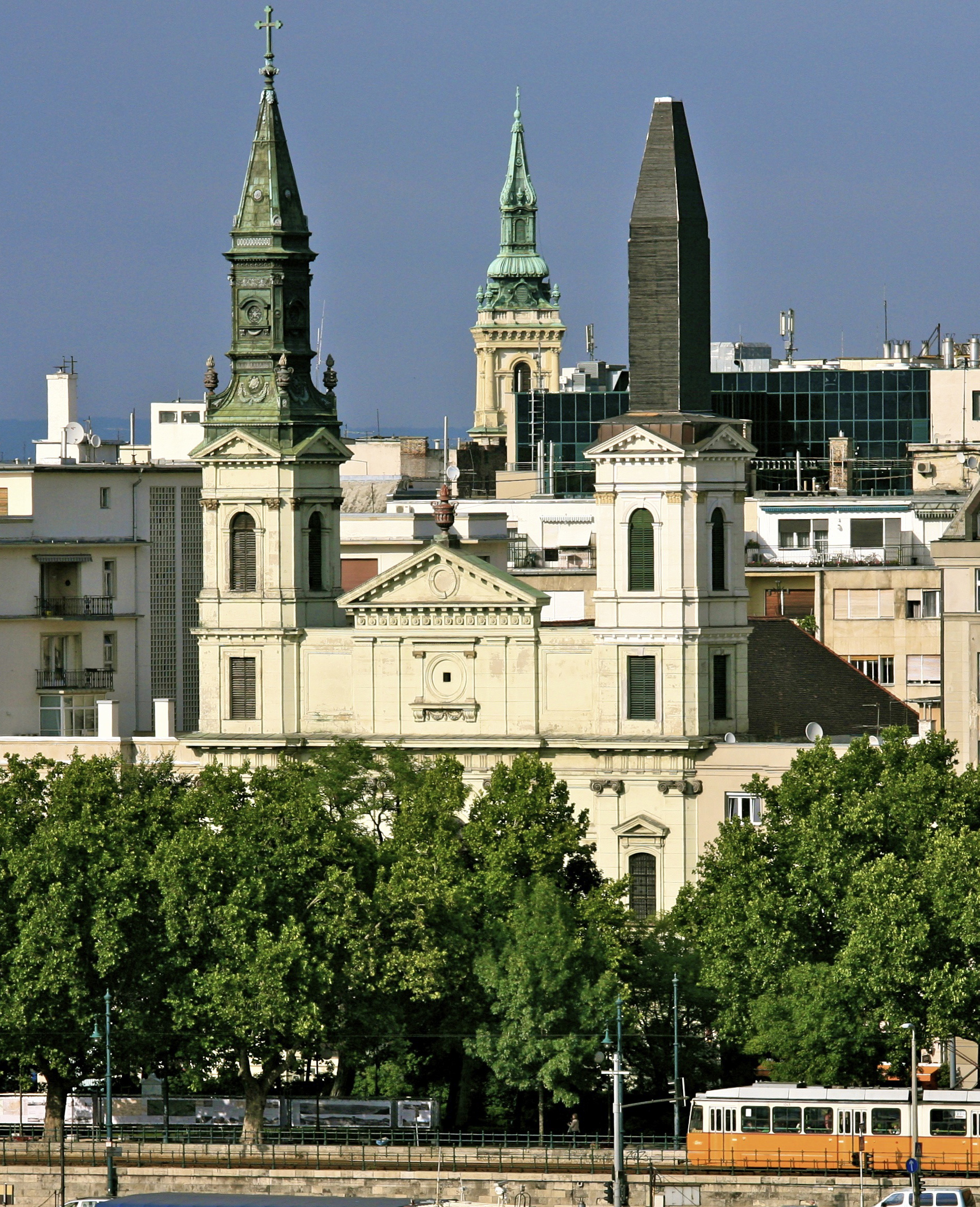
| Picture | Name | Construction time | Architectural style | Designer | Address, comments |
|---|---|---|---|---|---|
| | Serbian Orthodox Church of St. George | 1733–1752 | baroque | Mayerhoffer András | 1056 Budapest, Szerb utca 4. |
| | Istenszülő elhunyta Nagyboldogasszony-székesegyház | 1791–1801 | baroque | Jung József | 1052 Budapest, Petőfi tér 2. |

== District VI ==
=== Roman Catholic churches ===
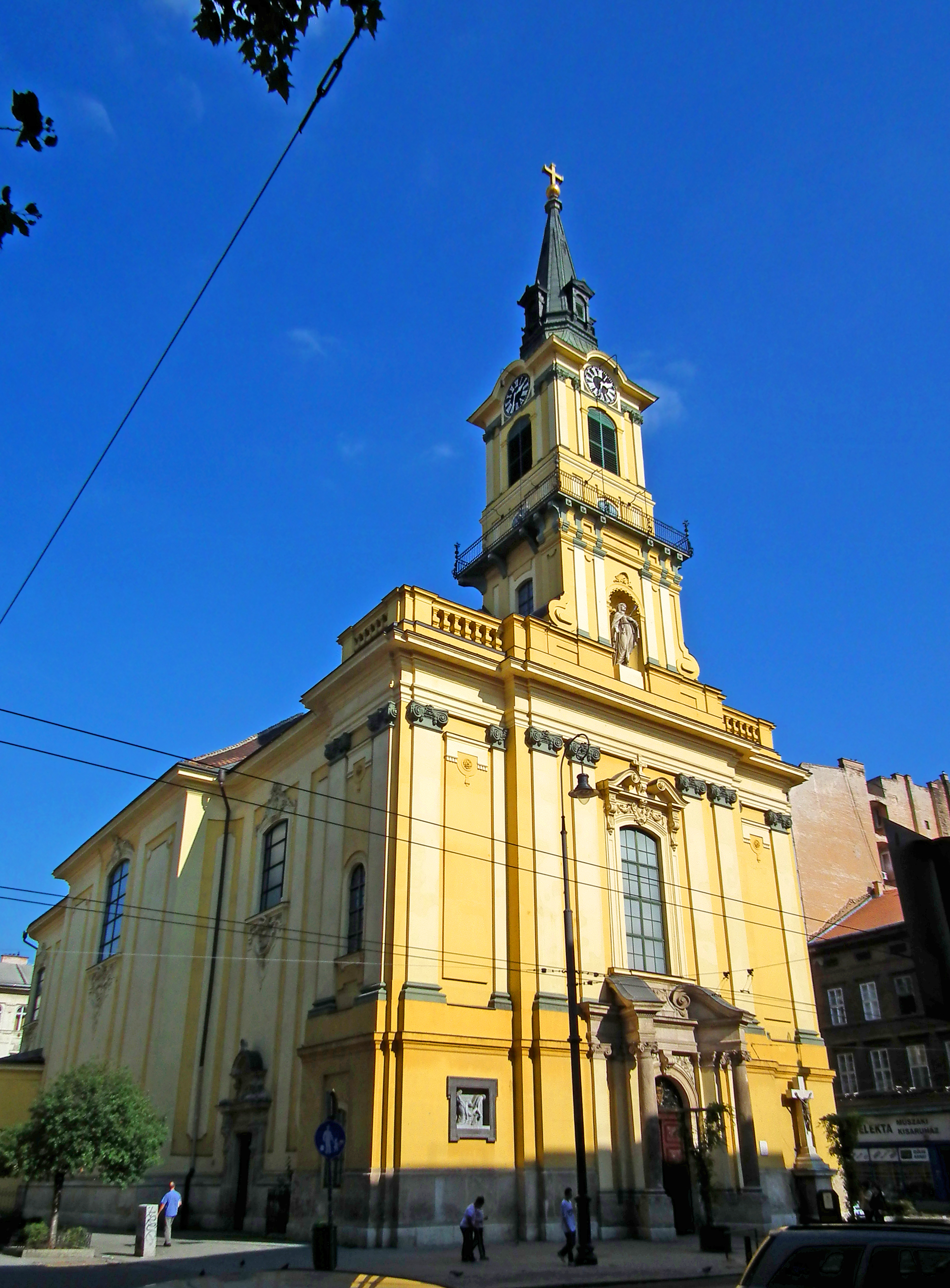
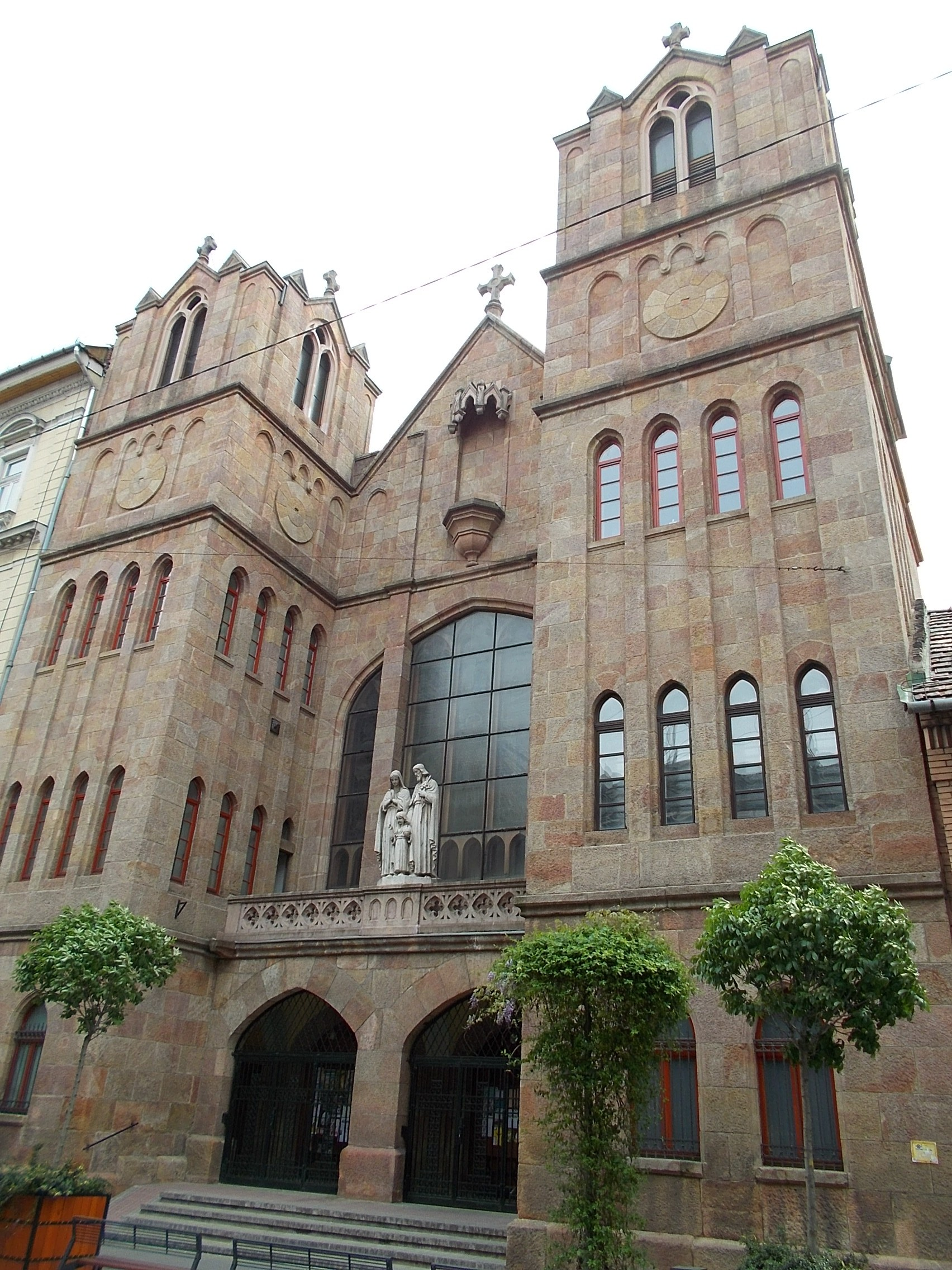
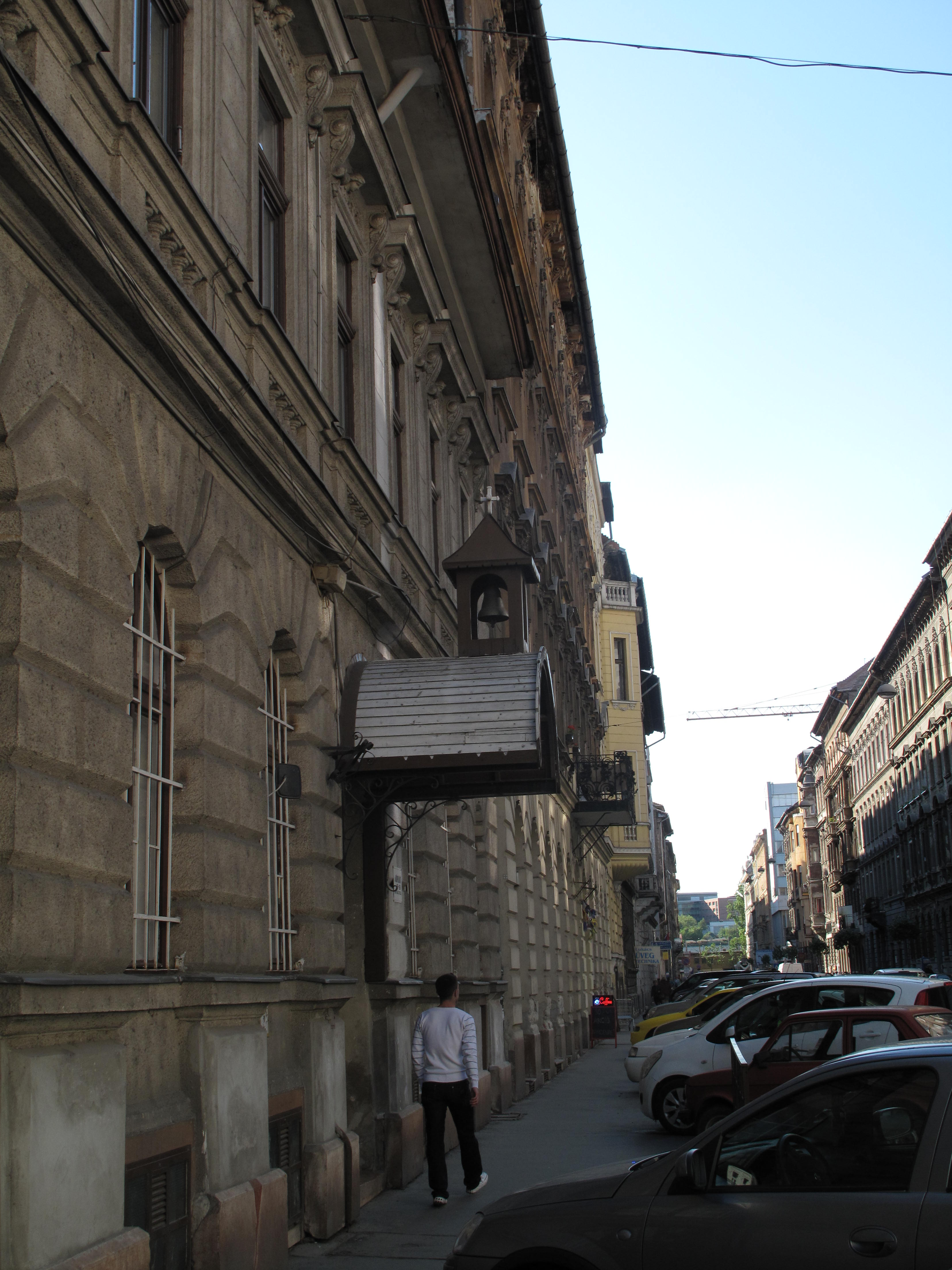
| Picture | Name | Construction time | Architectural style | Designer | Address, comments |
|---|---|---|---|---|---|
| | Ávilai Nagy Szent Teréz-plébániatemplom | 1801–1809 | baroque | Kasselik Fidél | 1065 Budapest, Pethő Sándor u. 2. |
| | Szent Család-kápolna | before 1921 | n. a. | n. a. | 1062 Budapest, Székely Bertalan u. 25. A barn was converted into a chapel. |
| | Szent Család-templom | 1930–1931 | neo-romanesque | Fábián Gáspár | 1063 Budapest, Szondi u. 67. |
| | Oltáriszentség-kápolna | before 1949 | n. a. | n. a. | 1064 Budapest, Vörösmarty u. 40. It was built in a residential house in 1949. |

=== Orthodox churches ===
| Picture | Name | Construction time | Architectural style | Designer | Address, comments |
|---|---|---|---|---|---|
| | Radonyezsi Szent Szergij orosz kápolna | n. a. | n. a. | n. a. | 1056 Budapest, Lendvay u. 26. |

=== Other churches ===
| Picture | Name | Construction time | Architectural style | Designer | Address, comments |
|---|---|---|---|---|---|
| | Felsőerdősori metodista imaház | n. a. | n. a. | n. a. | 1068 Budapest, Felsőerdősor u. 5. |
| | Terézvárosi adventista kápolna | n. a. | n. a. | n. a. | 1062 Budapest, Székely Bertalan u. 13. |

== District VII ==
=== Roman Catholic churches ===
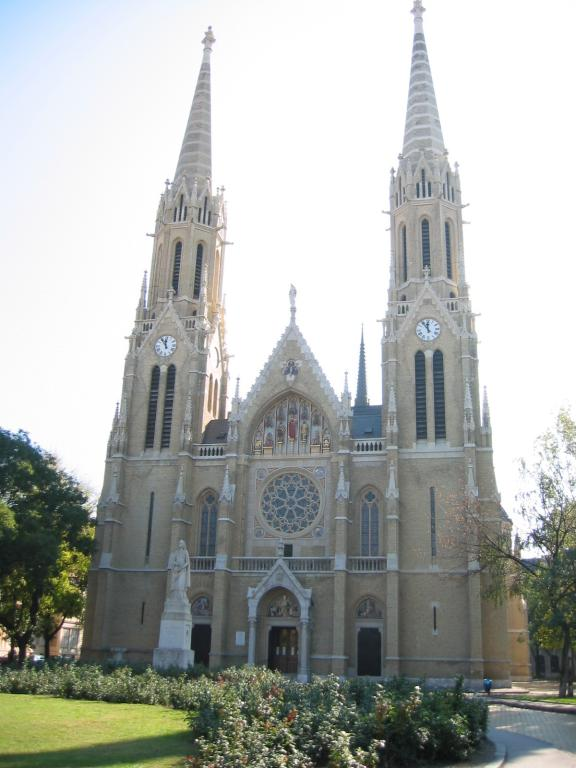
| Picture | Name | Construction time | Architectural style | Designer | Address, comments |
|---|---|---|---|---|---|
| | Árpád-házi Szent Erzsébet-plébániatemplom | 1895–1901 | neogothic | Steindl Imre | 1074 Budapest, Rózsák tere 8. |

=== Greek Catholic churches ===
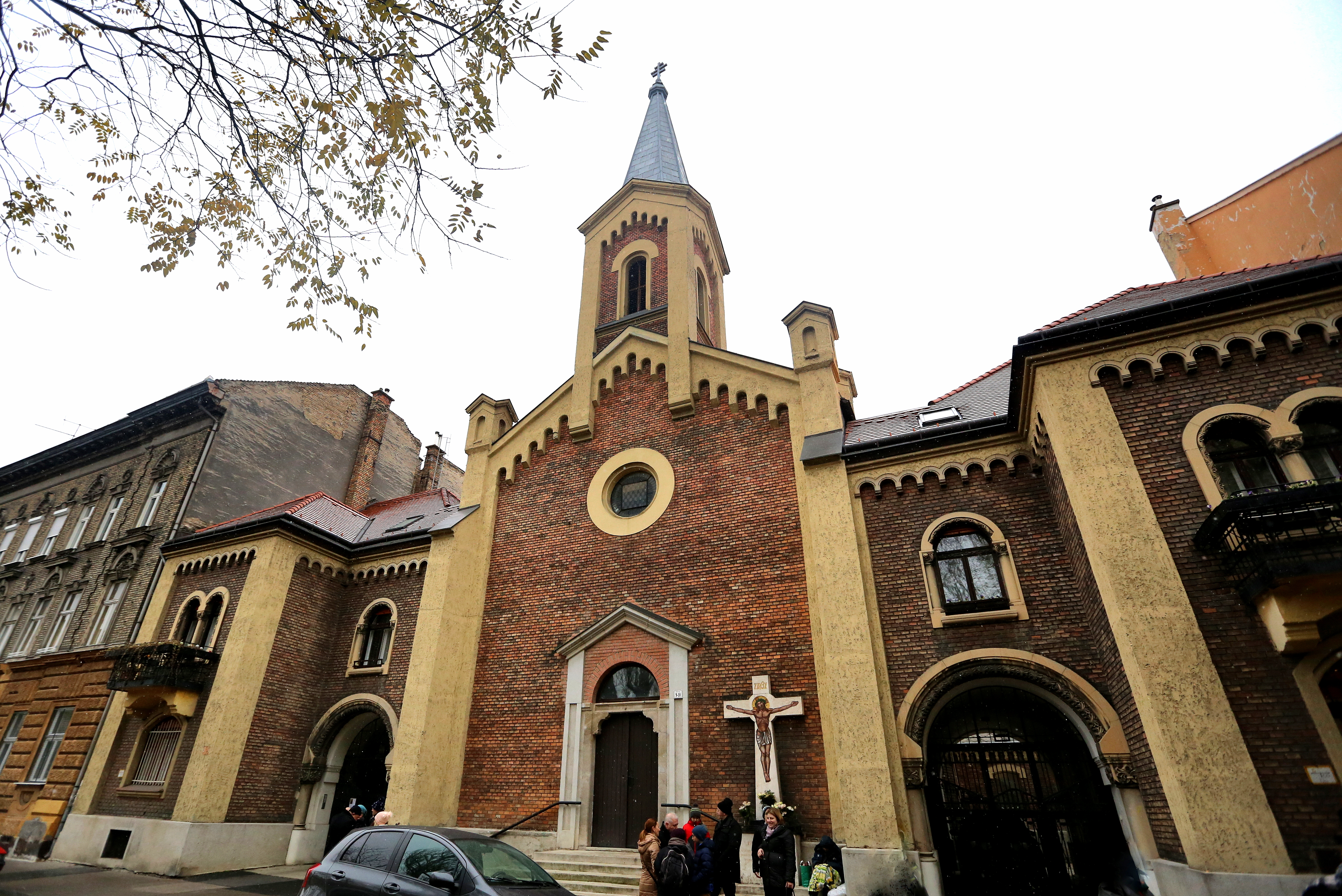
| Picture | Name | Construction time | Architectural style | Designer | Address, comments |
|---|---|---|---|---|---|
| | Istenszülő oltalma templom | 1881 | eclectic | Czigler Győző | 1074 Budapest, Rózsák tere 10. |

=== Reformed churches ===
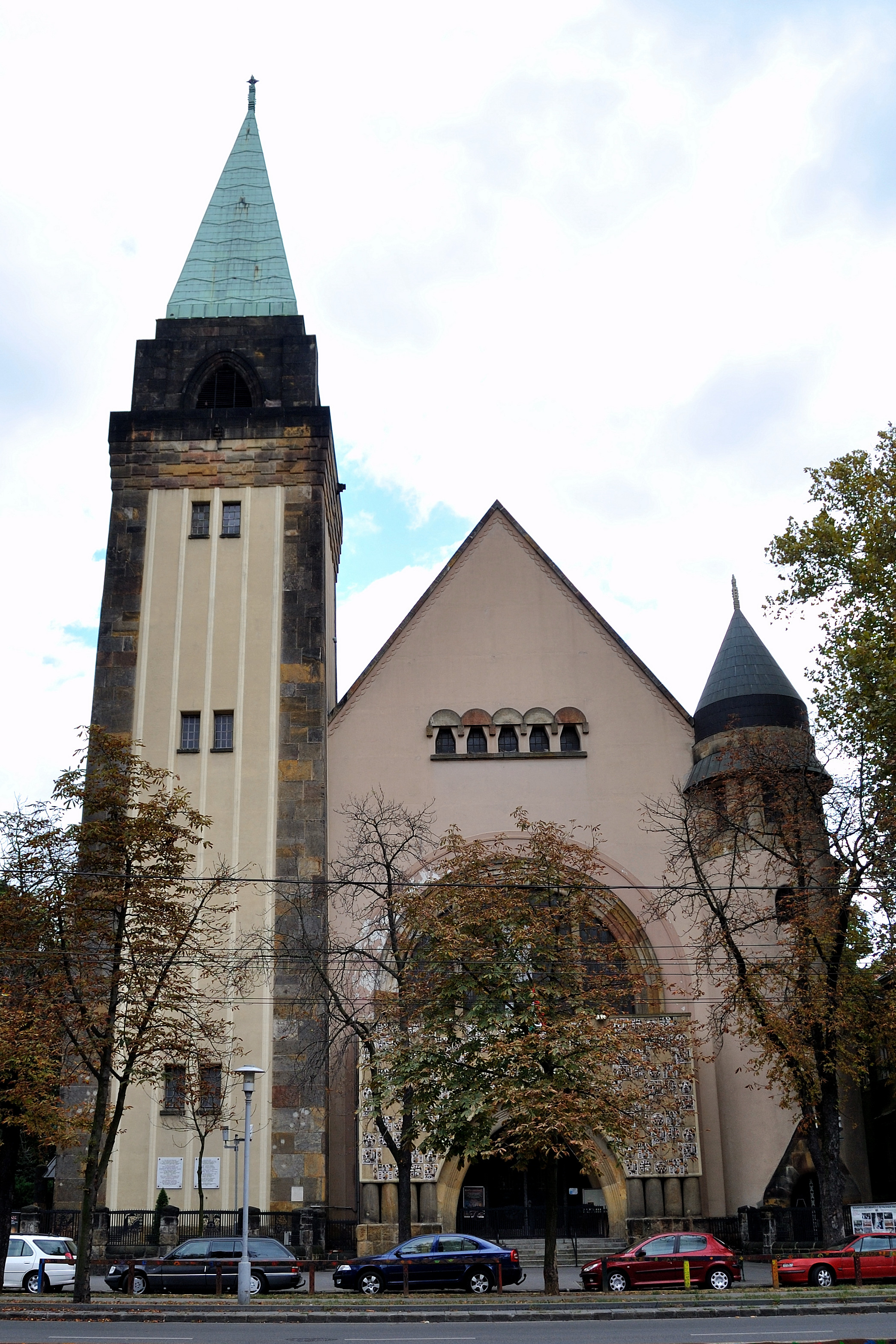
| Picture | Name | Construction time | Architectural style | Designer | Address, comments |
|---|---|---|---|---|---|
| | Reformed Church of Fasor (Fasori református templom) | 1911–1913 | Hungarian folk | Árkay Aladár | 1071 Budapest, Városligeti fasor 7. |

=== Evangelical churches ===
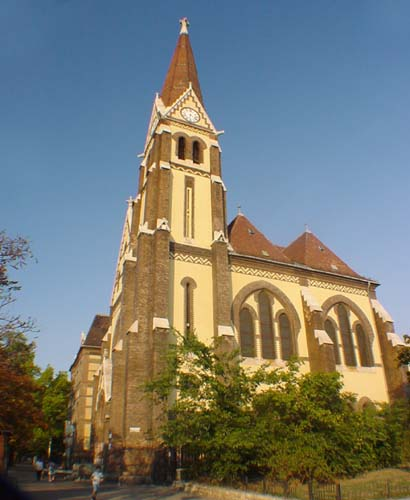
| Picture | Name | Construction time | Architectural style | Designer | Address, comments |
|---|---|---|---|---|---|
| | Fasori evangélikus templom | 1903–1905 | neogothic | Pecz Samu | 1071 Budapest, Városligeti fasor 17. |

=== Orthodox churches ===
| Picture | Name | Construction time | Architectural style | Designer | Address, comments |
|---|---|---|---|---|---|
| | Keresztelő Szent János román kápolna | 1859 | romantic | Hild József | 1075 Budapest, Holló u. 8. It was built in 1900 in the tenement house. |

=== Other churches ===
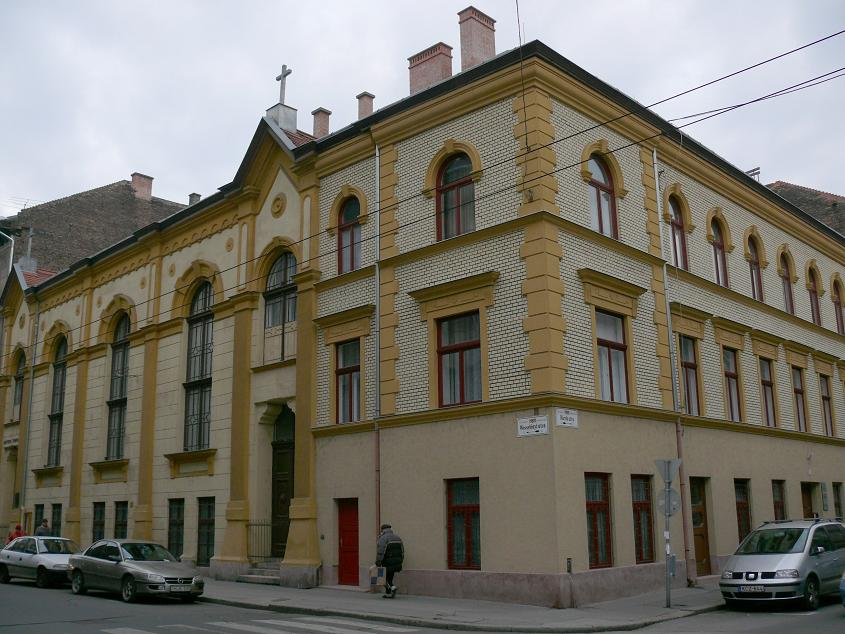
| Picture | Name | Construction time | Architectural style | Designer | Address, comments |
|---|---|---|---|---|---|
| | Wesselényi utcai baptista templom és közösségi ház | 1884–1887 | neogothic | n. a. | 1077 Budapest, Wesselényi u. 53. The first Baptist church in Hungary. |

== District VIII ==
=== Roman Catholic churches ===
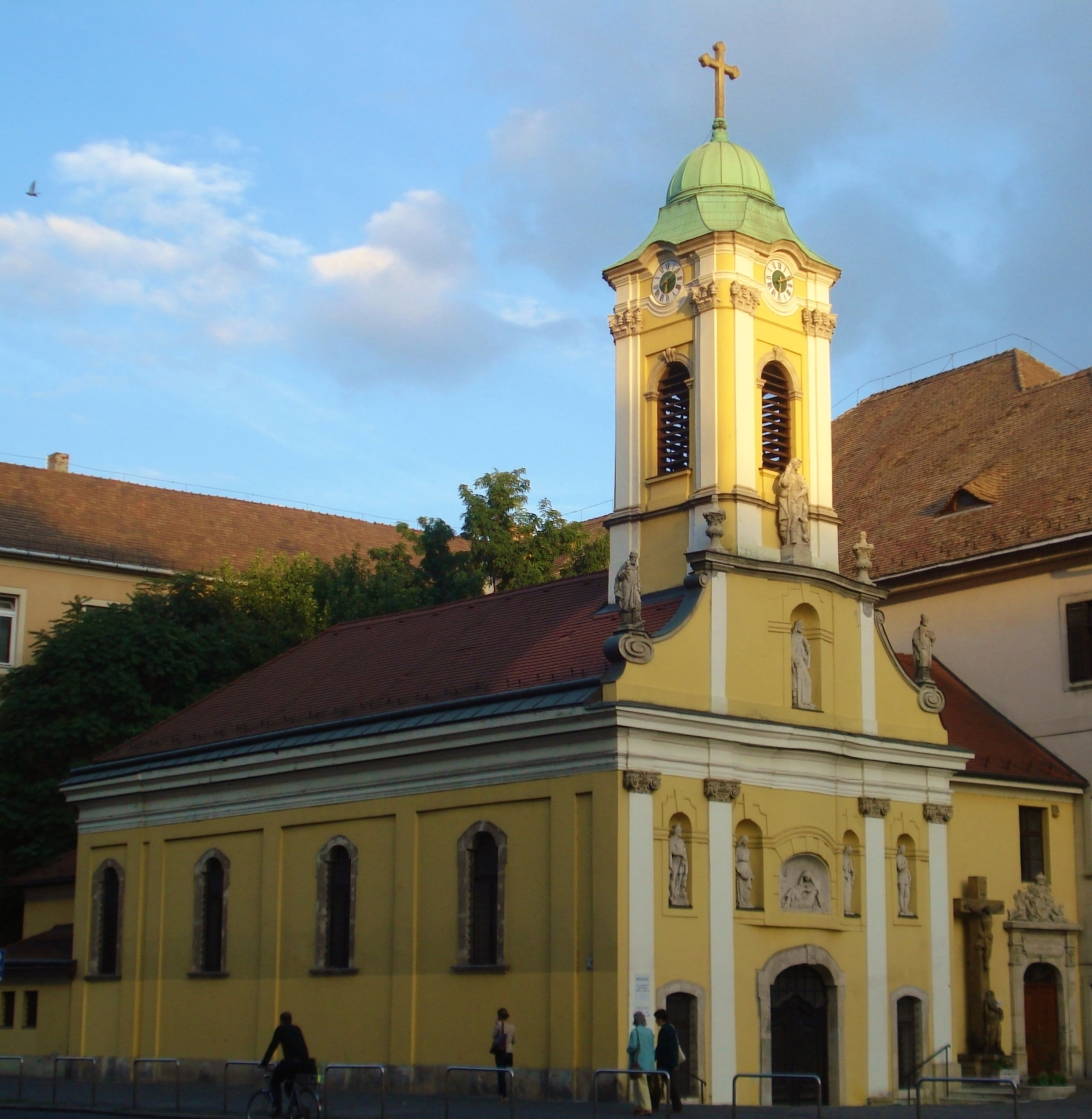
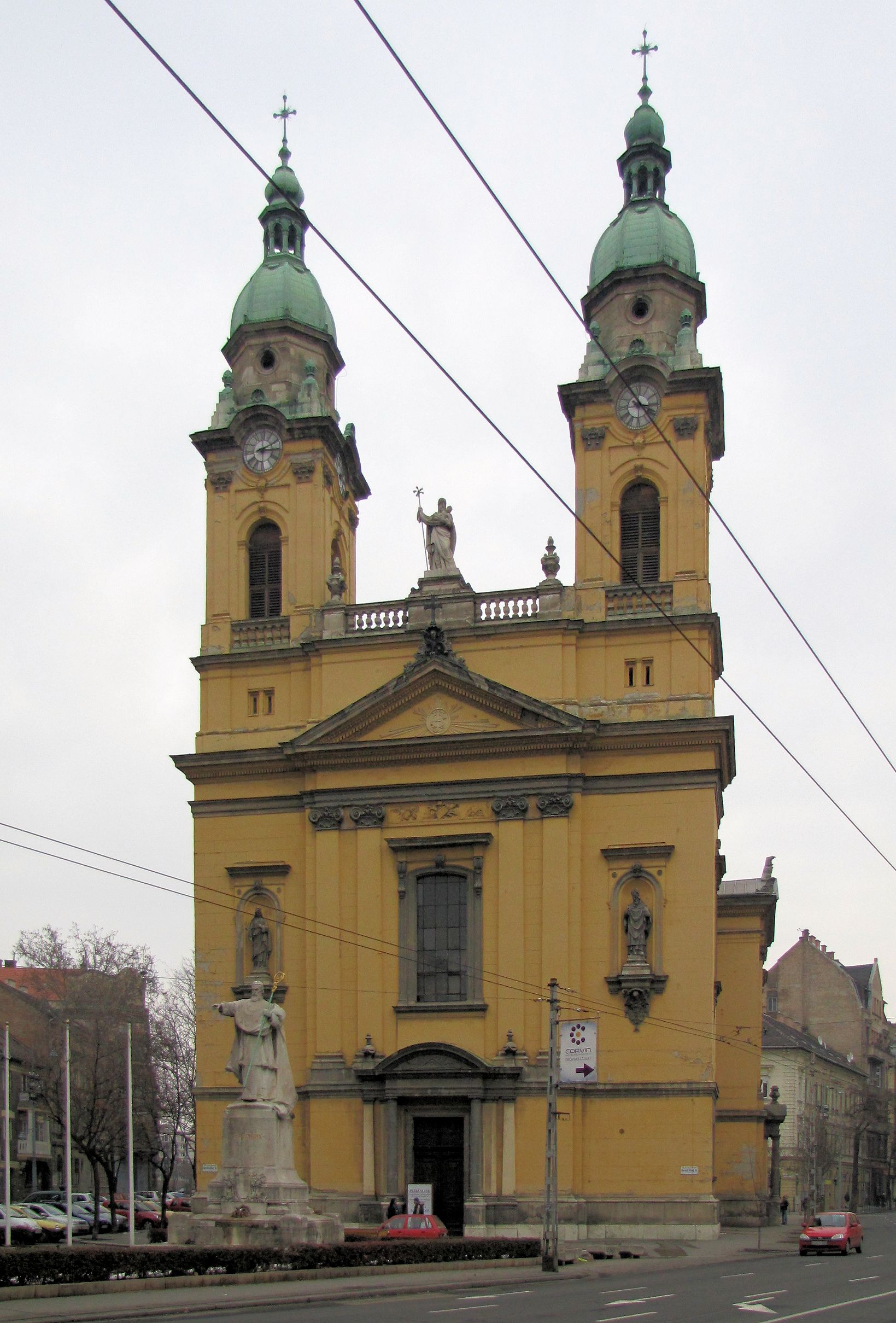
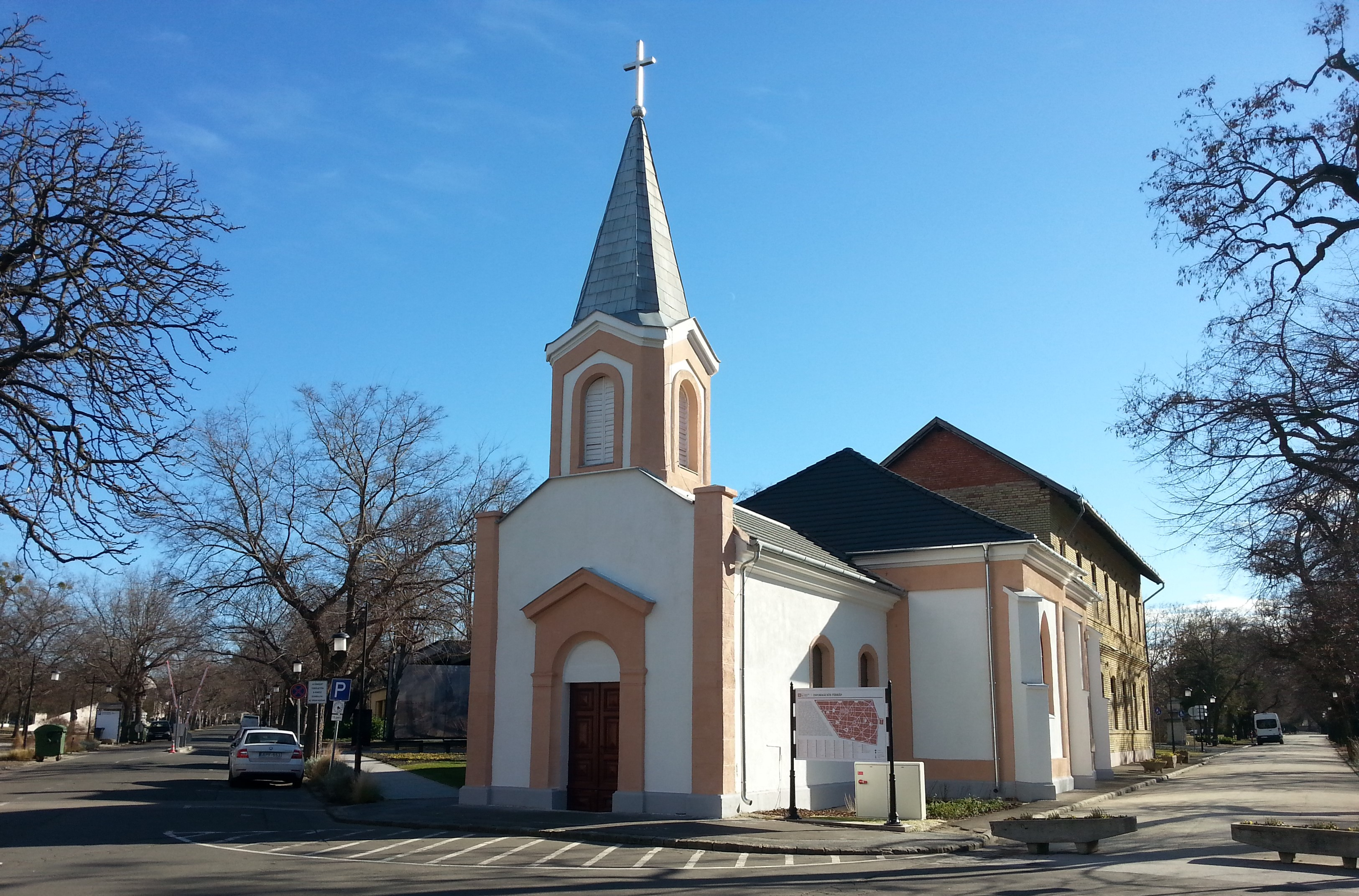
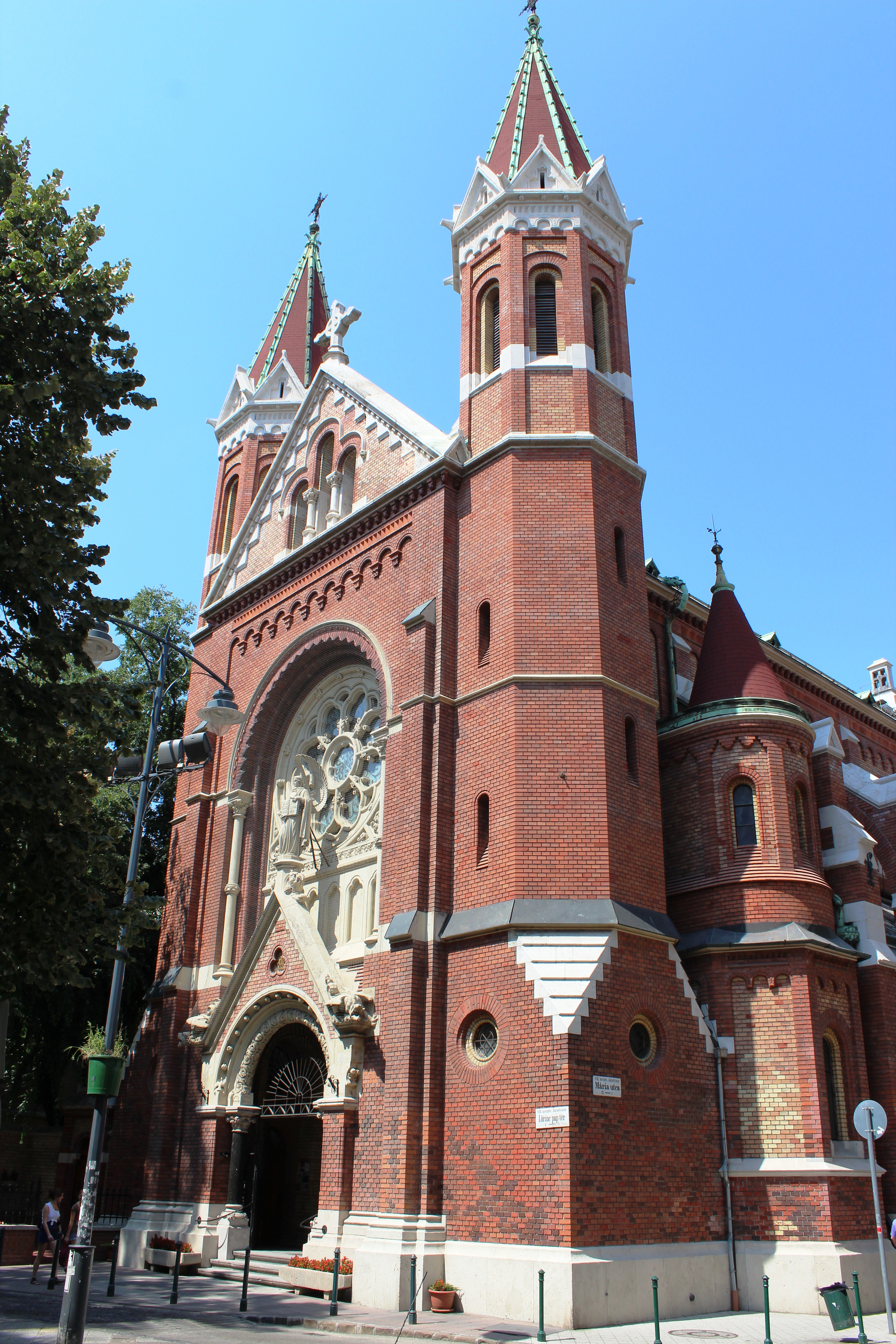
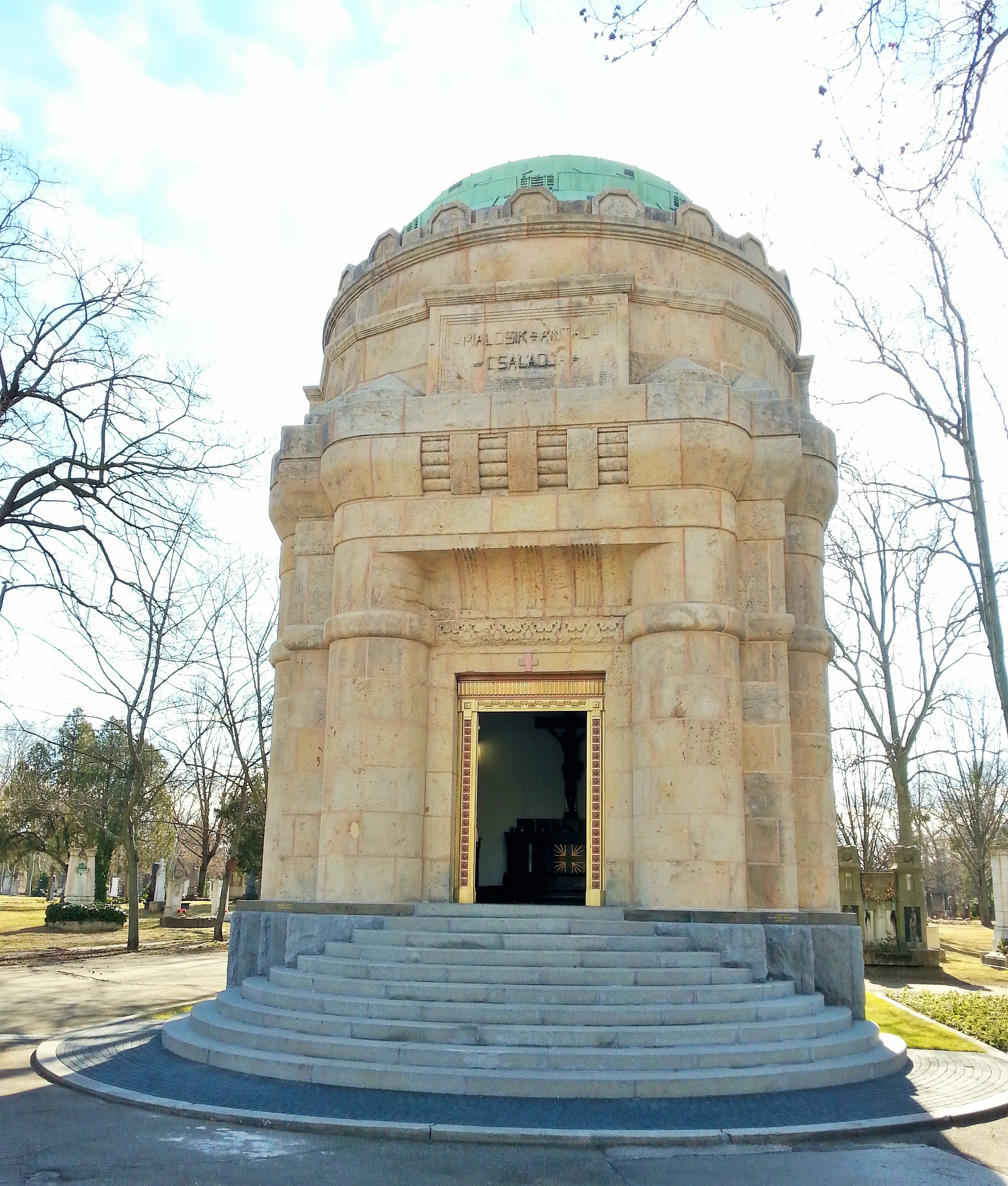
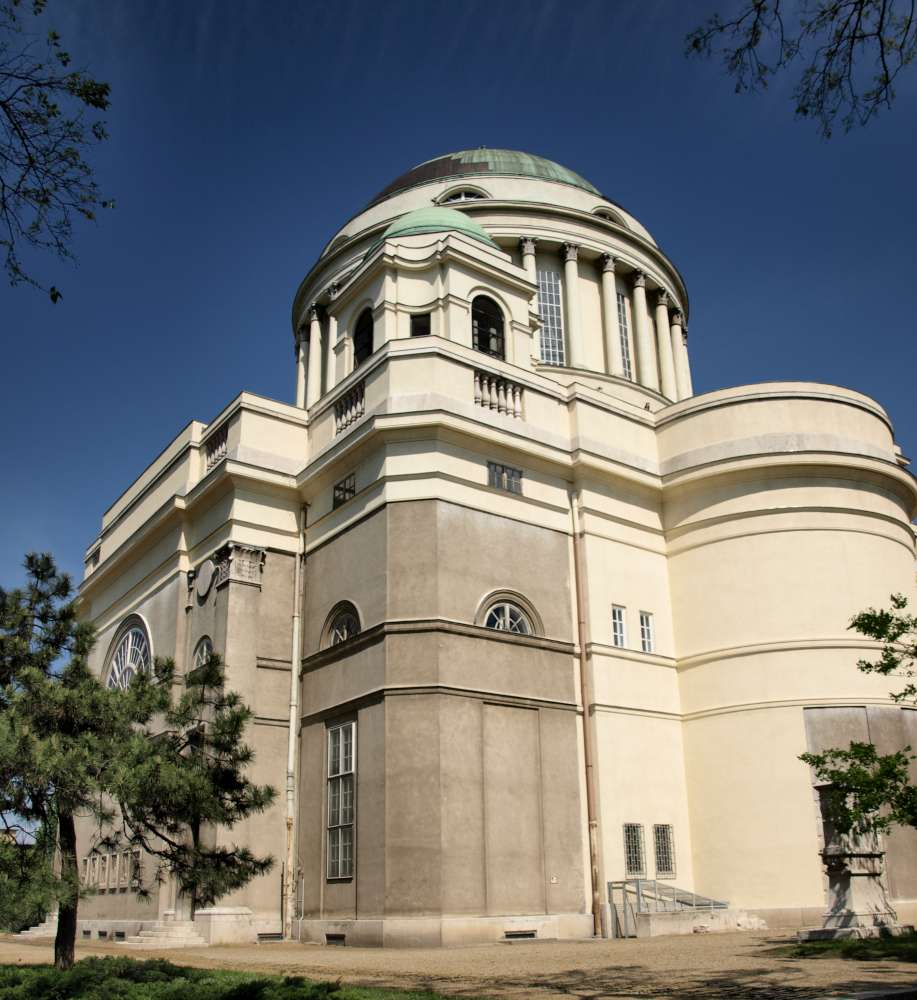
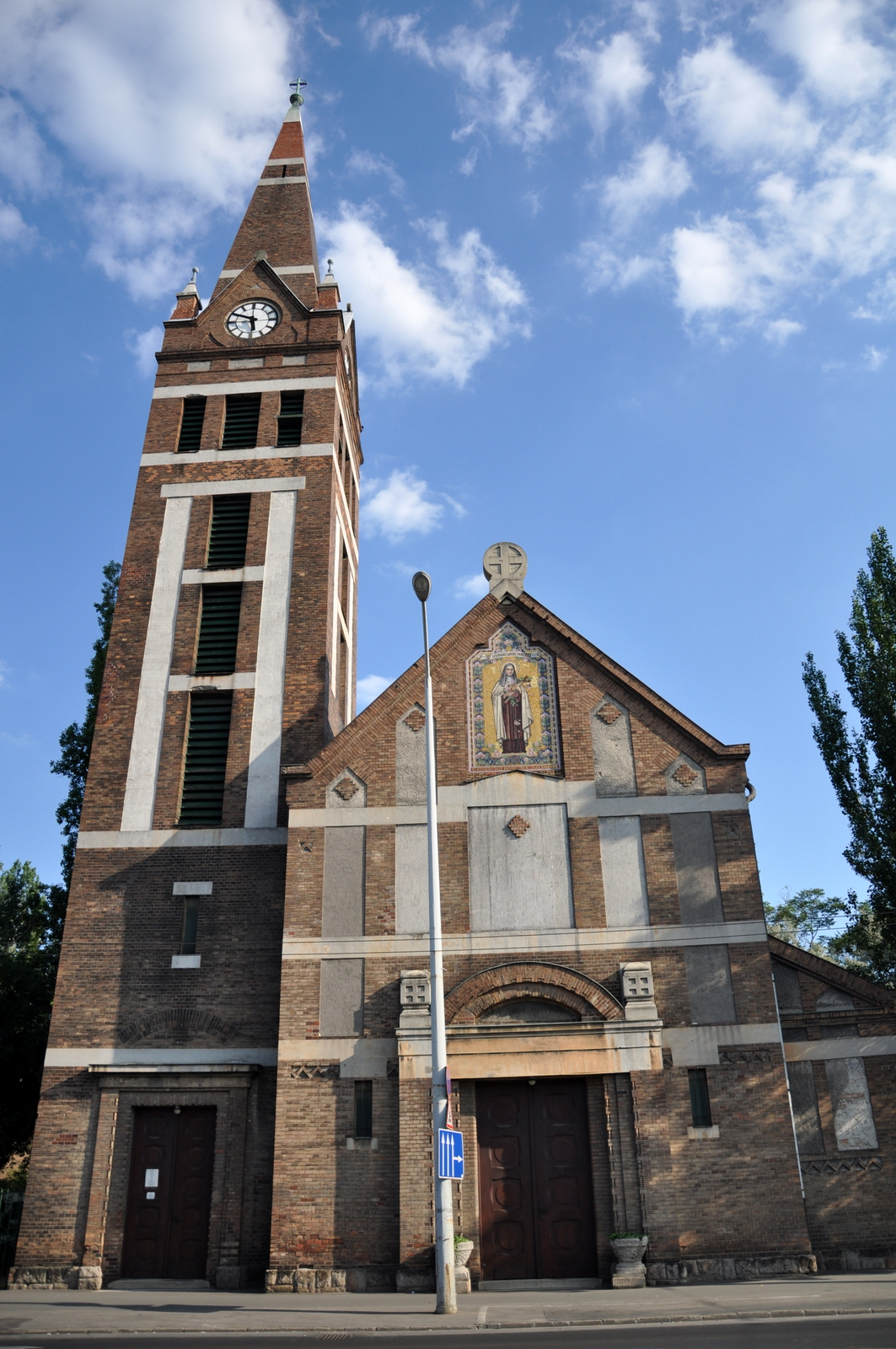
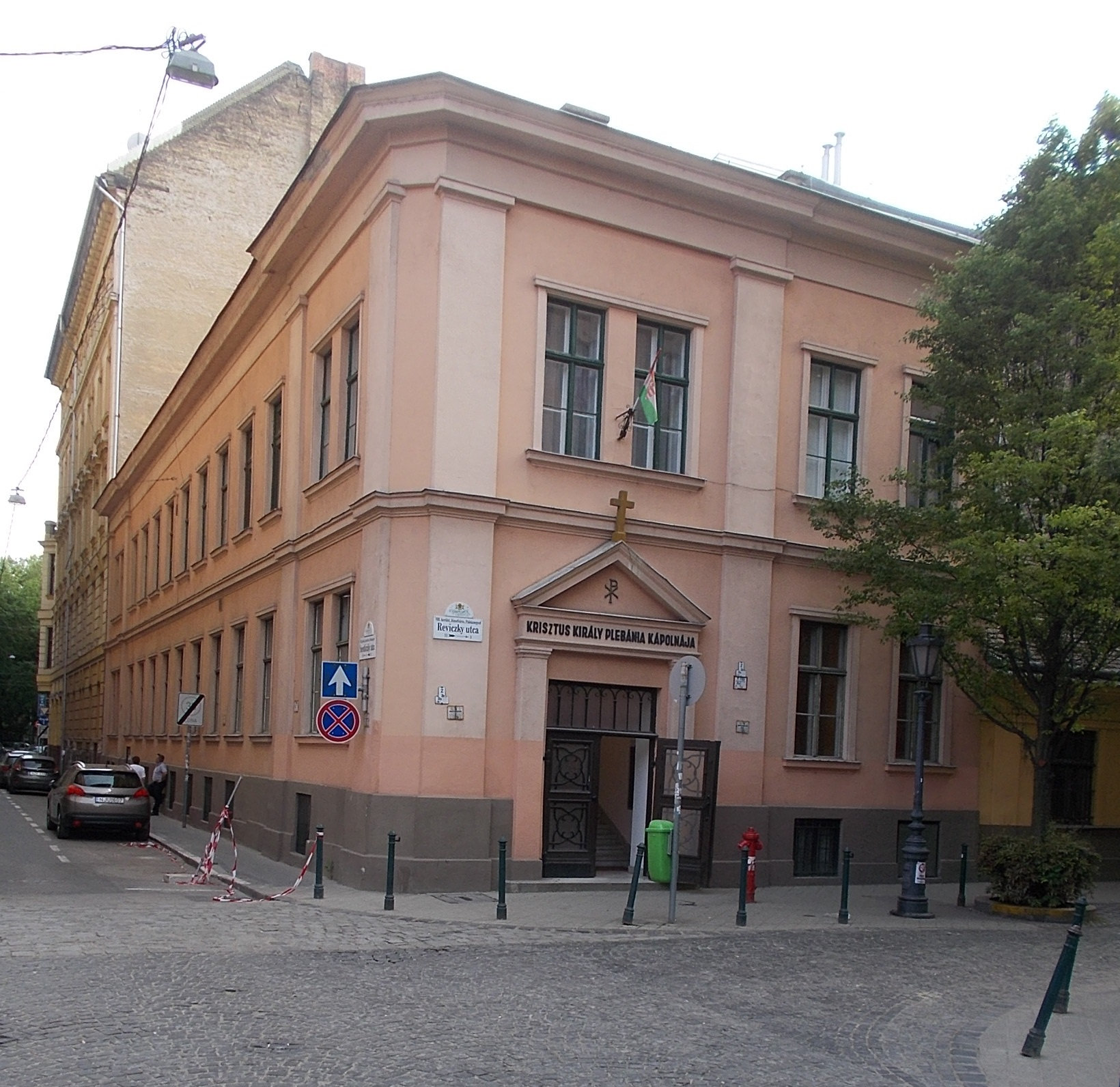
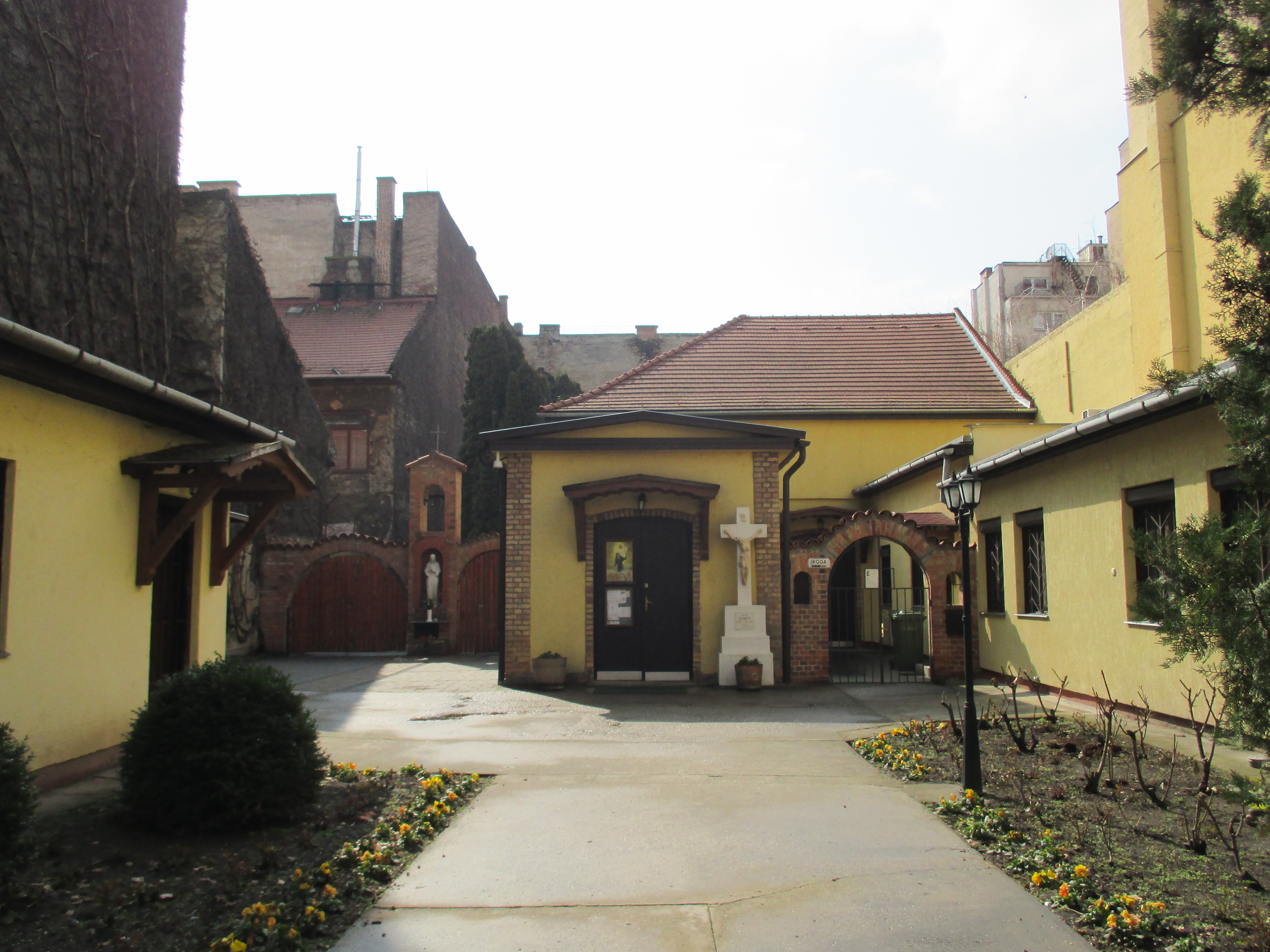
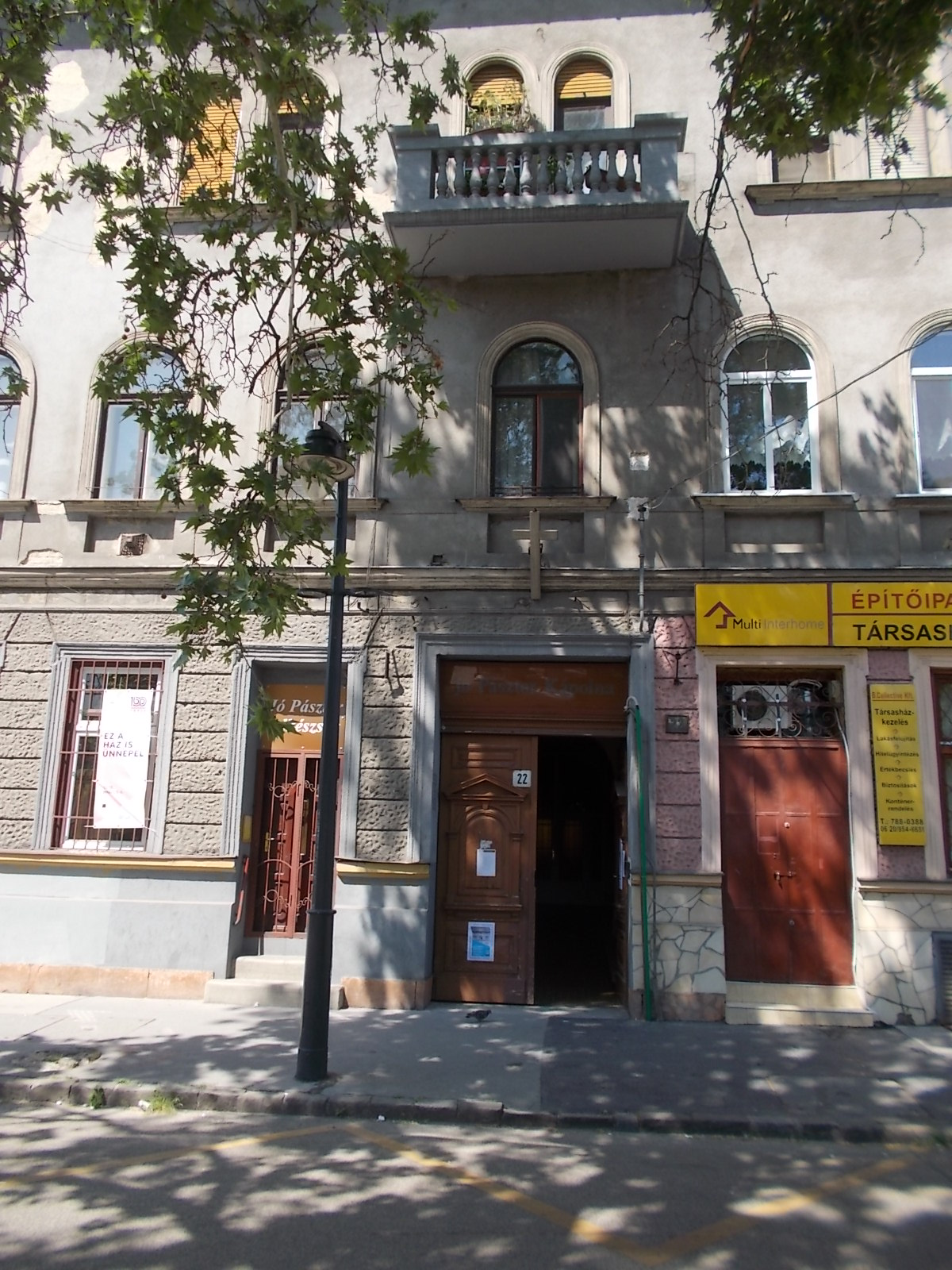
| Picture | Name | Construction time | Architectural style | Designer | Address, comments |
|---|---|---|---|---|---|
| | Szent Rókus-kápolna | 1711 | baroque | n. a. | 1085 Budapest, Gyulai Pál u. 2. |
| | Józsefvárosi Szent József-templom | 1797–1814 | baroque | Tallherr József | 1082 Budapest, Horváth Mihály tér 7. |
| | Krisztus Urunk mennybemenetele kápolna (Kerepesi temető kápolnája) | 1857 | romantic | n. a. | 1086 Budapest, Fiumei út 16–18. The Catholic Chapel of the Fiume Road Tomb Garden. |
| | Józsefvárosi Jézus Szíve-templom | 1888–1891 | neo-romanesque | Kauser József | 1085 Budapest, Mária u. 25. |
| | A Malosik-mauzóleum kápolnája | 1906–1917 | Art Nouveau | Wachtel Elemér | 1086 Budapest, Fiumei út 16–18. It is located in Fiume Road Tomb Garden. |
| | Tisztviselőtelepi Magyarok Nagyasszonya-plébániatemplom | 1924–1931 | neoclassicist | Kismarty-Lechner Jenő | 1089 Budapest, Bláthy Ottó utca 22. |
| | Lisieux-i Szent Teréz-templom | 1928 | neo-eclectic | Petrovácz Gyula | 1087 Budapest, Kerepesi út 33. |
| | Budapest-Belsőjózsefvárosi Krisztus Király plébánia | 1928 | n. a. | n. a. | 1088 Budapest, Reviczky u. 9. It is housed in a residential building that was built around 1910. |
| | Szent Rita kápolna | 1947 | n. a. | n. a. | 1081 Budapest, Kun u. 5. |
| | Béke Királynéja kápolna | 1950 | n. a. | n. a. | 1083 Budapest, Tömő u. 31. |
| | Kalocsai Iskolanővérek kápolnája | 1990 előtt | n. a. | n. a. | 1085 Budapest, Mária u. 20. It was built in an apartment building in 1990. |
| | Budapesti Jó Pásztor kápolna | n. a. | n. a. | n. a. | 1089 Budapest, Kálvária tér 22. Located in an apartment building. |

=== Reformed churches ===
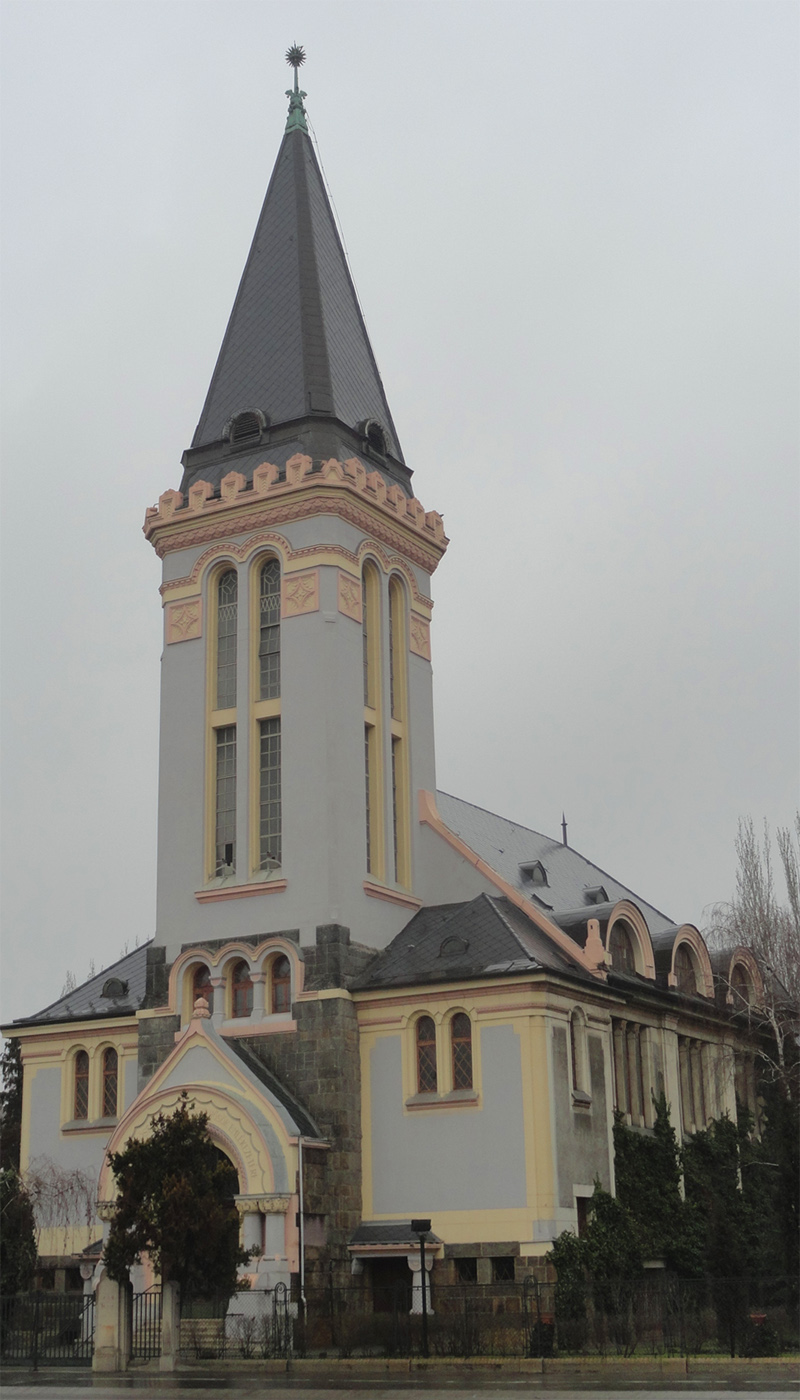
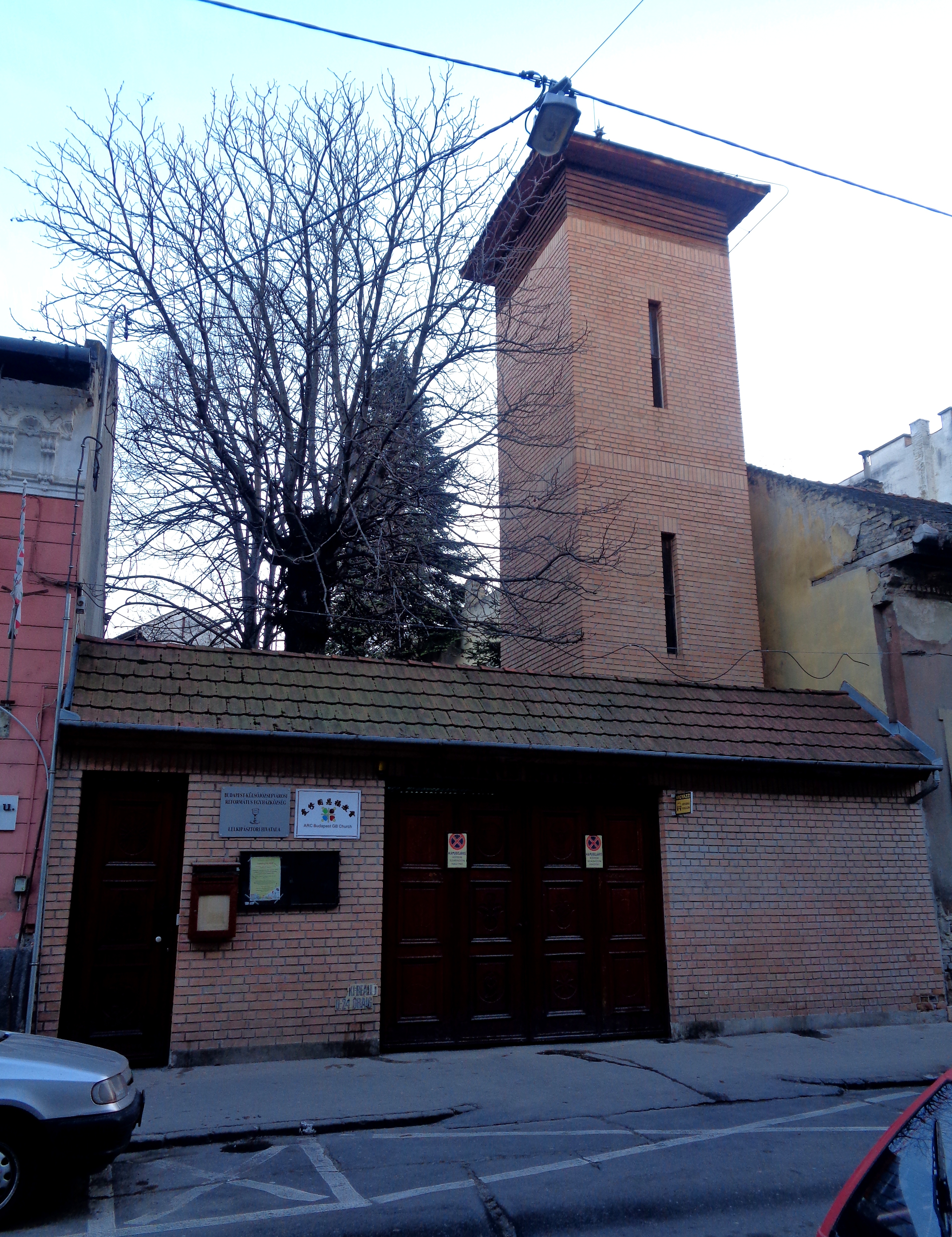
| Picture | Name | Construction time | Architectural style | Designer | Address, comments |
|---|---|---|---|---|---|
| | Magyar Reménység Református Templom (Salétrom utcai református templom) | before 1927 | n. a. | n. a. | 1085 Budapest, Salétrom u. 5. It was originally one of the warehouses of the Kölber car factory, which was converted into a church in 1927 according to the plans of Lóránd Almási Balogh. |
| | Nagyvárad téri református templom | 1930–1935 | neo-eclectic | Dudás Kálmán | 1089 Budapest, Üllői út 90. |
| | Kőris utcai református templom | 1940 | n. a. | n. a. | 1089 Budapest, Kőris u. 13. |
| | Törökőri református templom | 20. század | n. a. | n. a. | 1087 Budapest, Százados u. 4. |
| | Gyulai Pál utcai református imaterem | 20. század | n. a. | n. a. | 1085 Budapest, Gyulai Pál u. 9. |

=== Evangelical churches ===
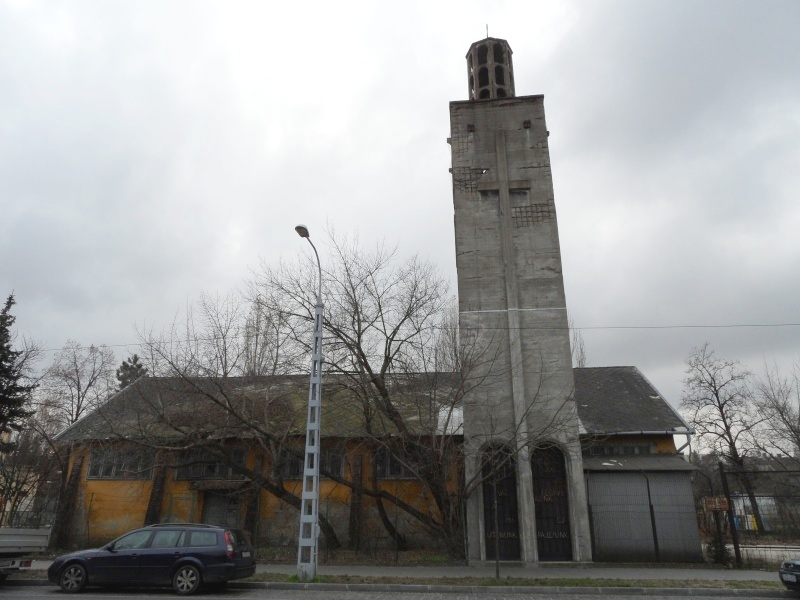
| Picture | Name | Construction time | Architectural style | Designer | Address, comments |
|---|---|---|---|---|---|
| , | Luther-udvar temploma | 1867 | romantic | n. a. | 1081 Budapest, Rákóczi út 57/a. The church stands in the courtyard of an apartment building. Out of order. |
| | Üllői úti evangélikus templom | 1905 | n. a. | Francsek Imre | 1088 Budapest, Üllői út 24. Located in an apartment building. It was originally built as a boardroom. |
| | Vajda Péter utcai templomtorony | 1934 | modern | Lux Kálmán | 1089 Budapest, Bláthy Ottó utca 33–35. Only the tower stands today. |
| | Mandák Mária evangélikus gyülekezeti ház | 20. század | n. a. | n. a. | 1086 Budapest, Karácsony Sándor u. 31–33. |

=== Orthodox churches ===
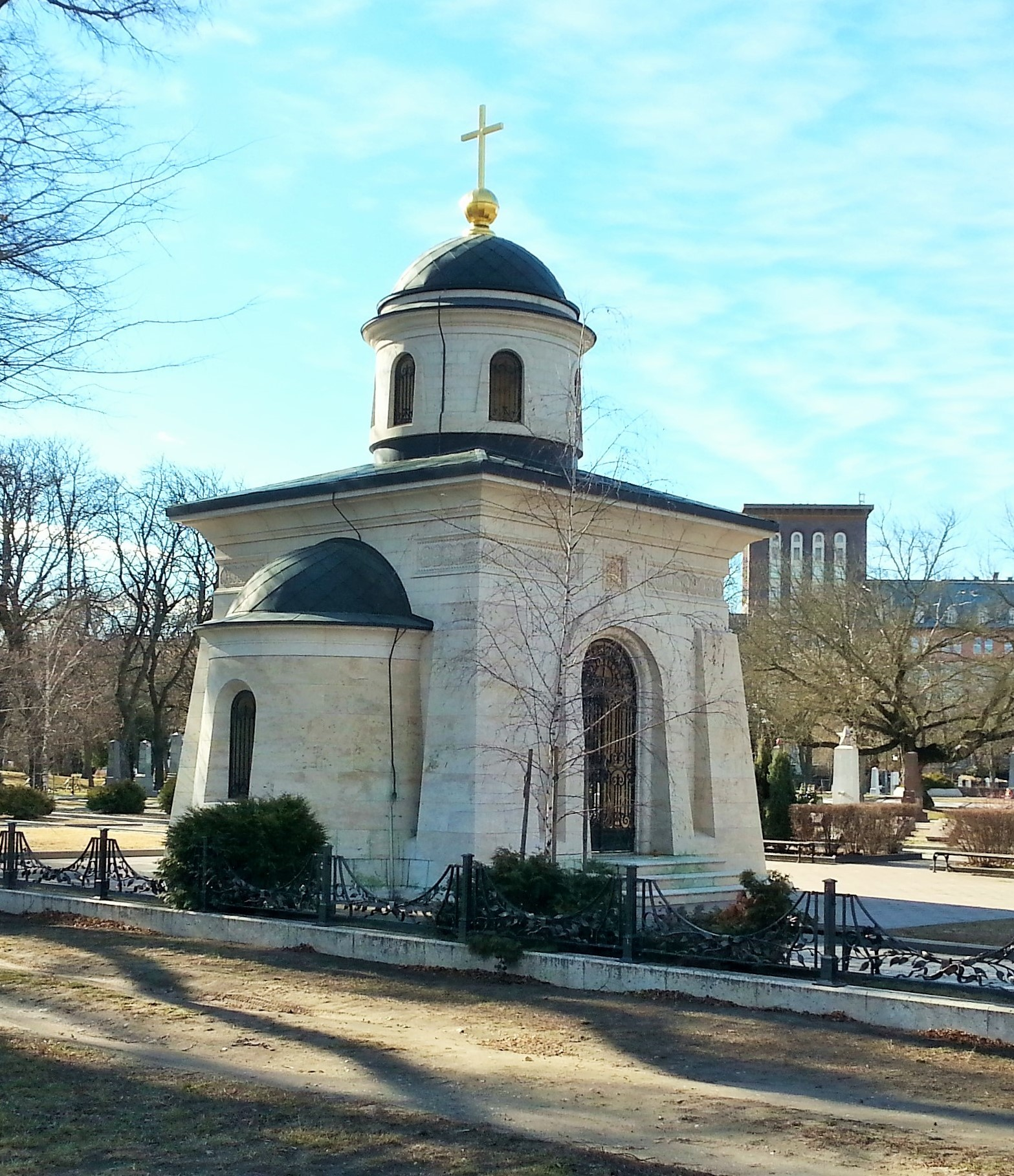
| Picture | Name | Construction time | Architectural style | Designer | Address, comments |
|---|---|---|---|---|---|
| | Mihály arkangyal kápolna | c. 2014 | n. a. | n. a. | 1086 Budapest, Fiumei út 16–18. It was built during the renovation of the Soviet military plot of Fiume Road Tomb Garden. |

=== Other churches ===
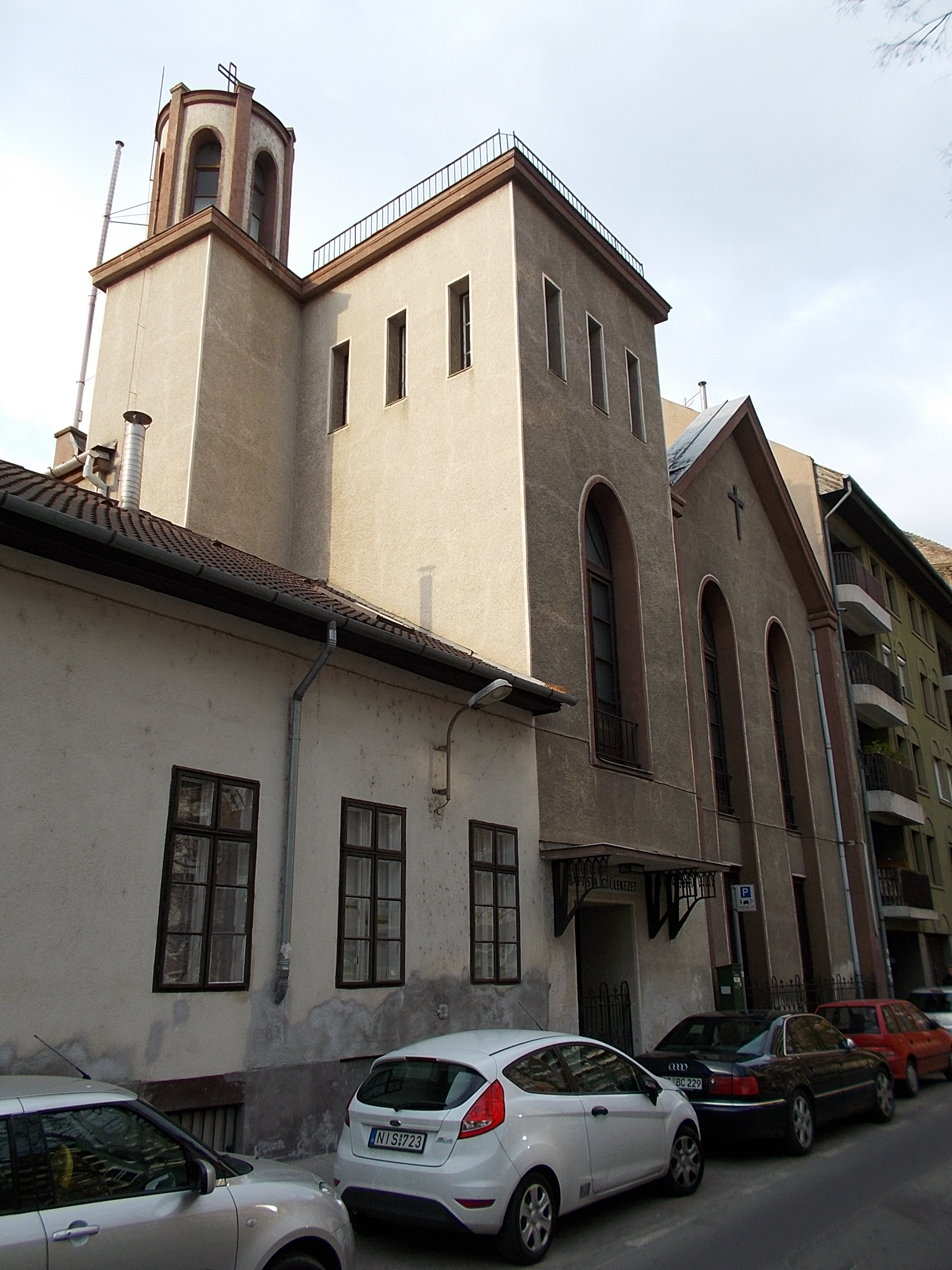
| Picture | Name | Construction time | Architectural style | Designer | Address, comments |
|---|---|---|---|---|---|
| | József utcai baptista kápolna | 1914 | n. a. | n. a. | 1084 Budapest, József u. 12. |
| | Nap utcai baptista templom | 20th century | n. a. | n. a. | 1082 Budapest, Nap u. 40. |
| | Krisztus Szege metodista kápolna | 20th century | n. a. | n. a. | 1086 Budapest, Dankó u. 11. It was built in an old butcher shop building. |
| | Józsefvárosi adventista imaház | 20th century | n. a. | n. a. | 1083 Budapest, Práter u. 12. |

== District IX ==
=== Roman Catholic churches ===
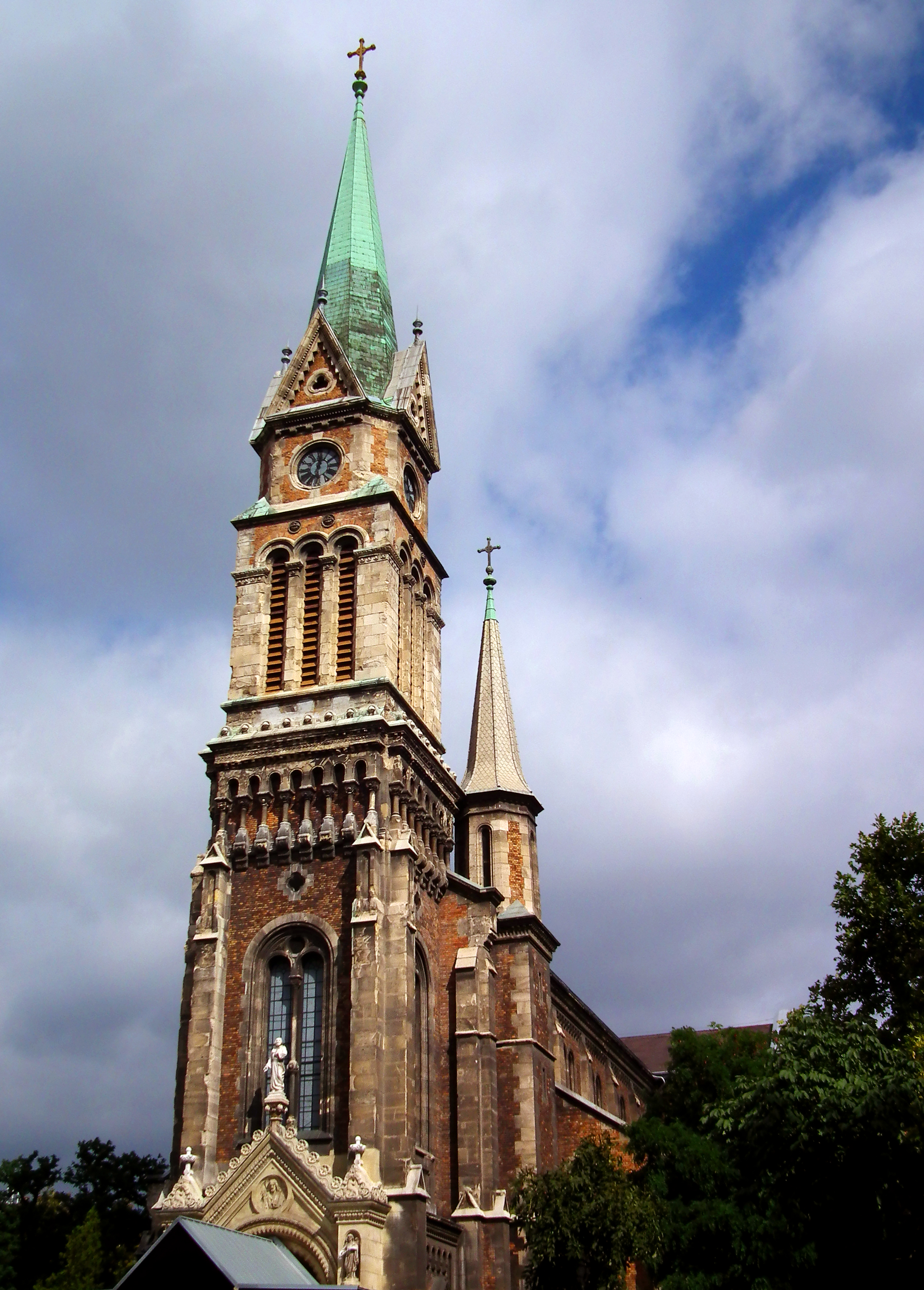
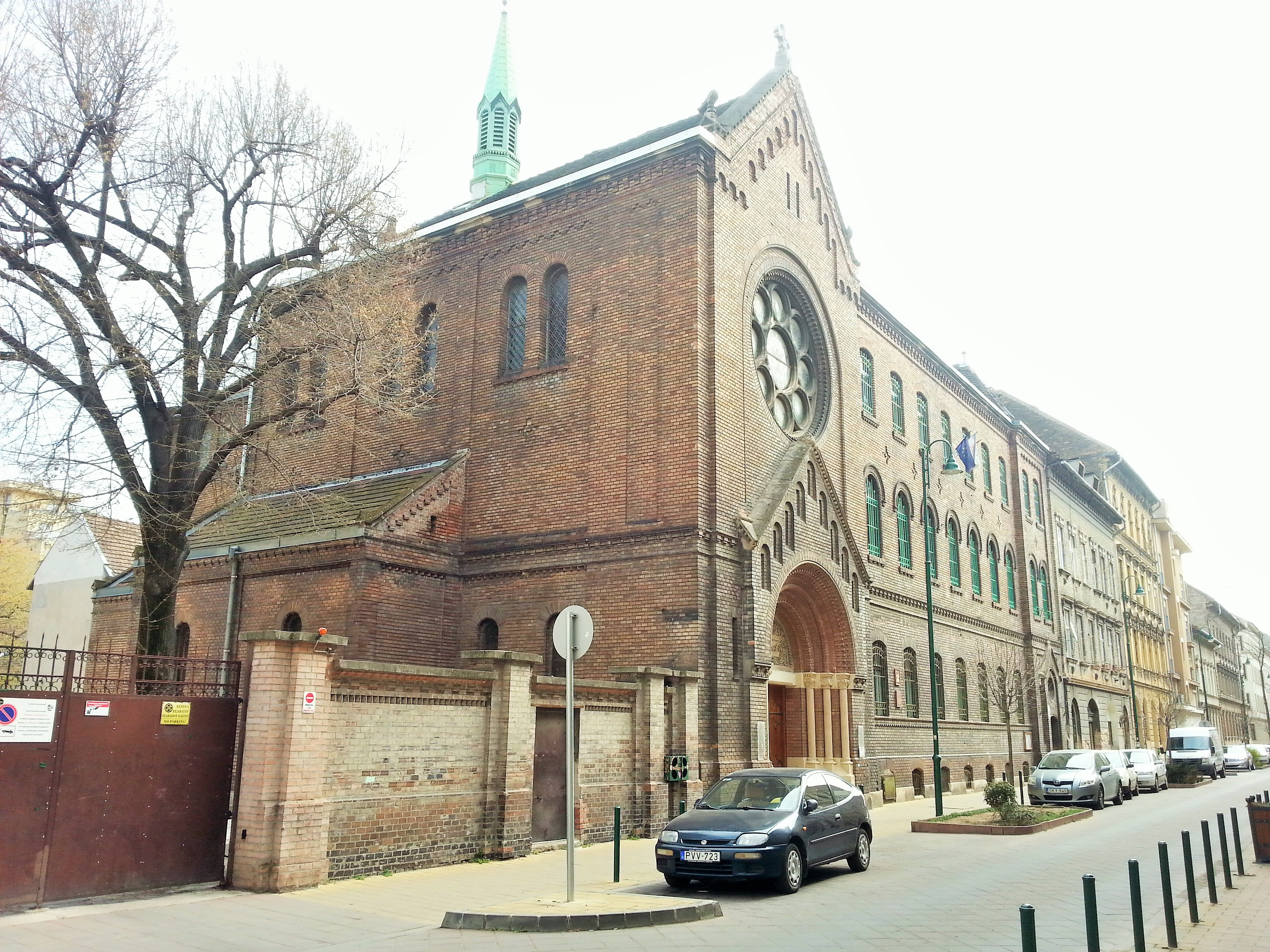
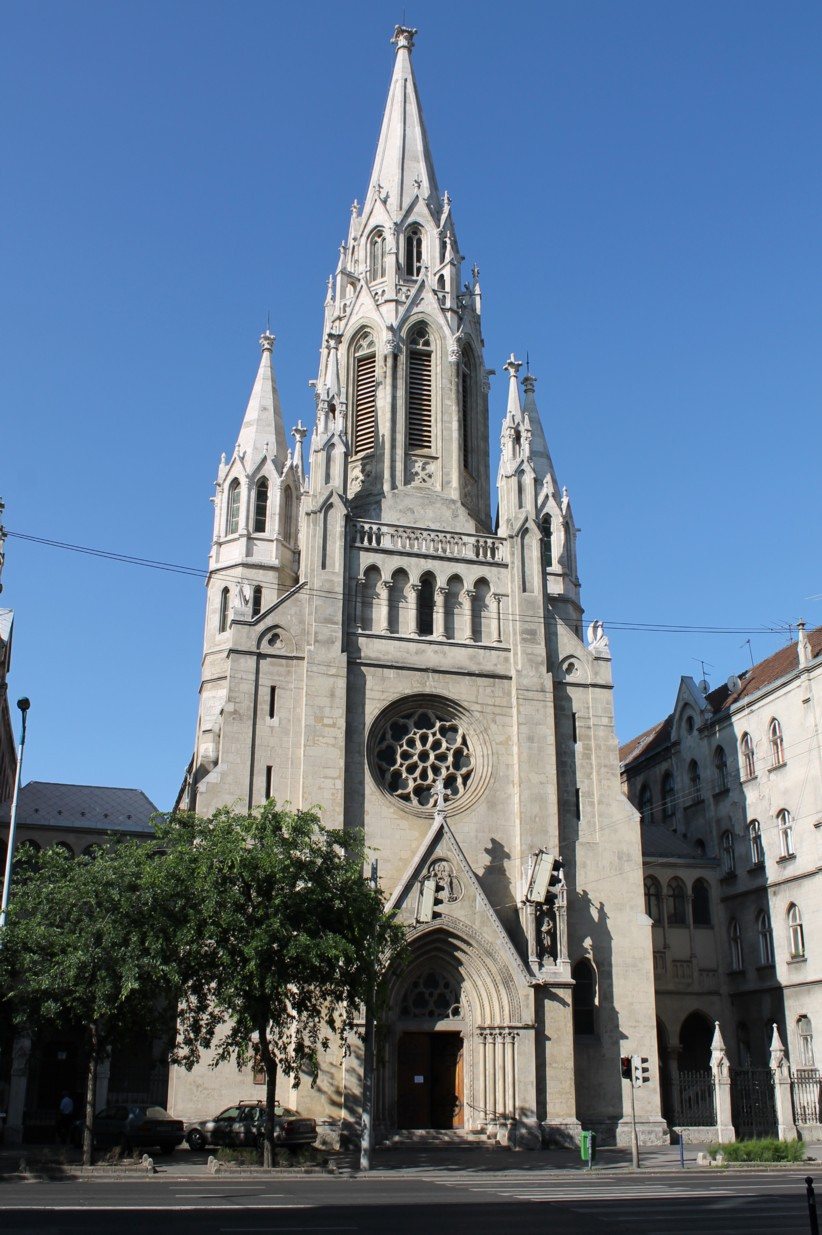
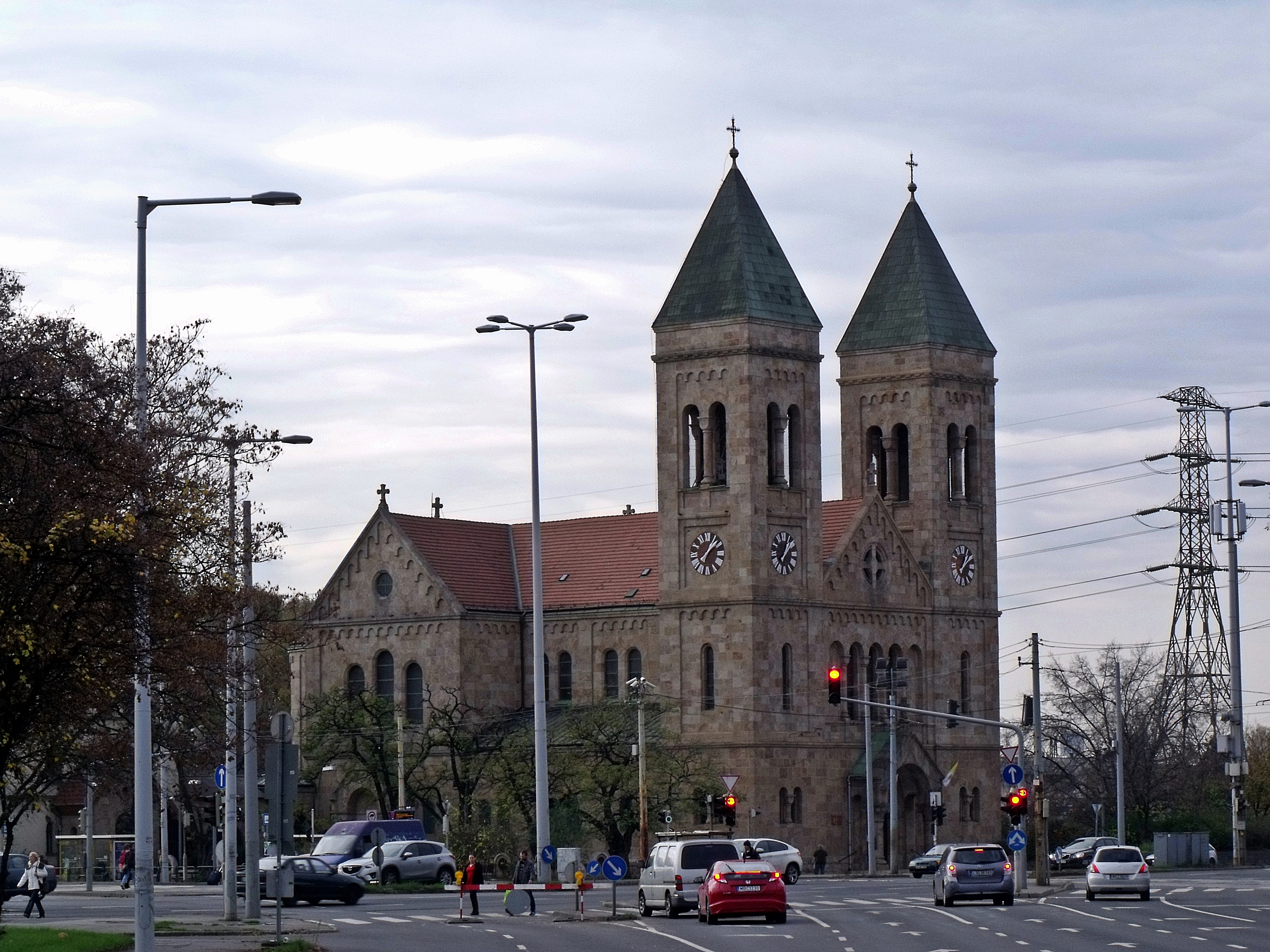
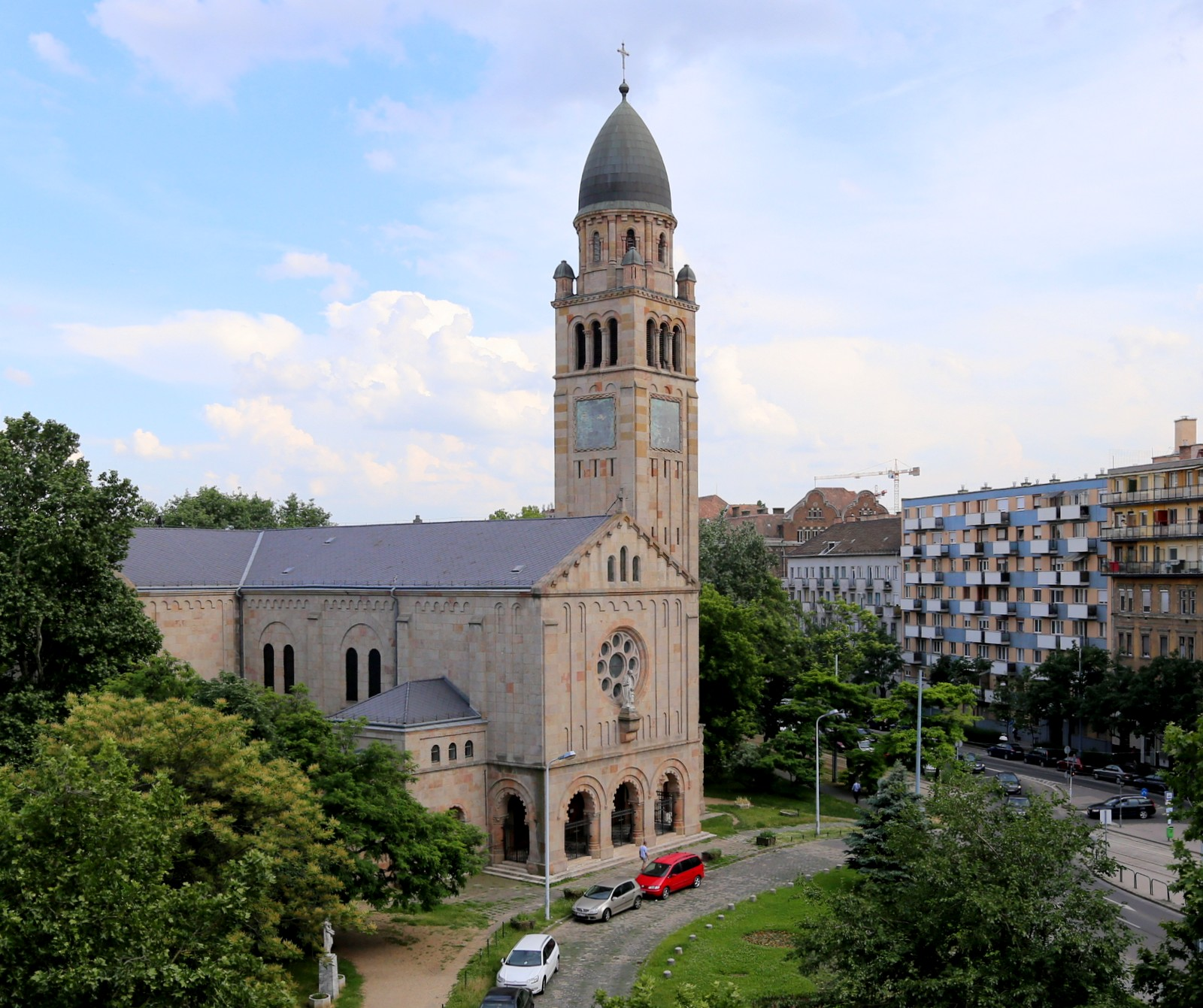
| Picture | Name | Construction time | Architectural style | Designer | Address, comments |
|---|---|---|---|---|---|
| | Assisi Szent Ferenc-templom | 1867–1879 | neogothic | Ybl Miklós | 1092 Budapest, Bakáts tér 13. |
| | Kaniziusz Szent Péter-templom | 1903 | neo-romanesque | Hofhauser Antal | 1095 Budapest, Gát utca 2–6. |
| | Örökimádás templom | 1904–1908 | neogothic | Aigner Sándor | 1094 Budapest, Üllői út 77. |
| | Szent Kereszt-templom | 1929–1930 | neo-romanesque | Fábián Gáspár | 1091 Budapest, Üllői út 145. |
| | Páli Szent Vince-plébániatemplom | 1935–1936 | neo-romanesque | Fábián Gáspár | 1096 Budapest, Haller u. 19–21. |
| | Külsősoroksári úti Szent Borbála kápolna | n. a. | n. a. | n. a. | 1097 Budapest, Hentes u. 17. |

=== Reformed churches ===
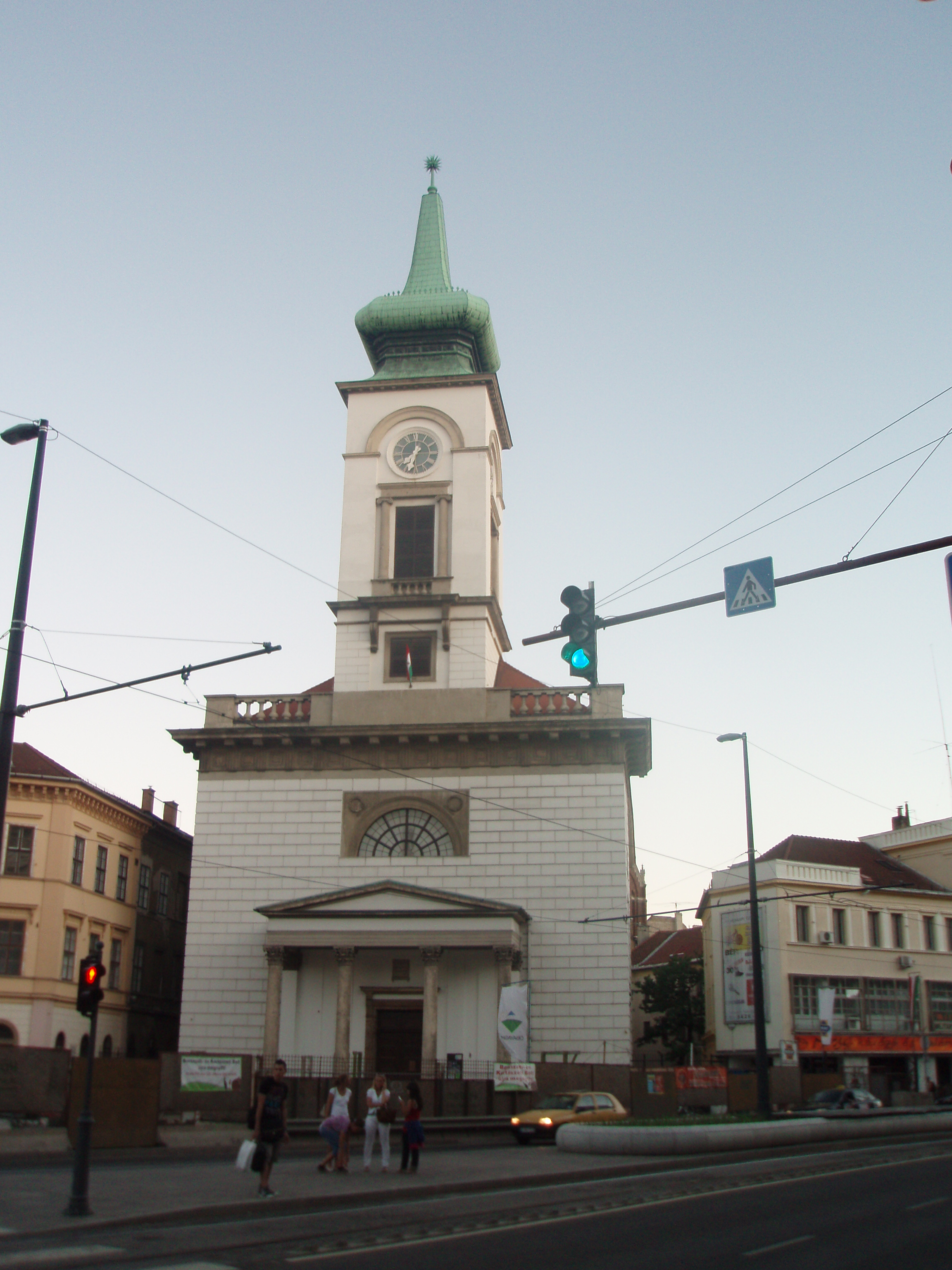
| Picture | Name | Construction time | Architectural style | Designer | Address, comments |
|---|---|---|---|---|---|
| | Kálvin téri református templom | 1816–1830 | classicist | Hild Vince | 1091 Budapest, Kálvin tér 7. |

=== Unitarian churches ===
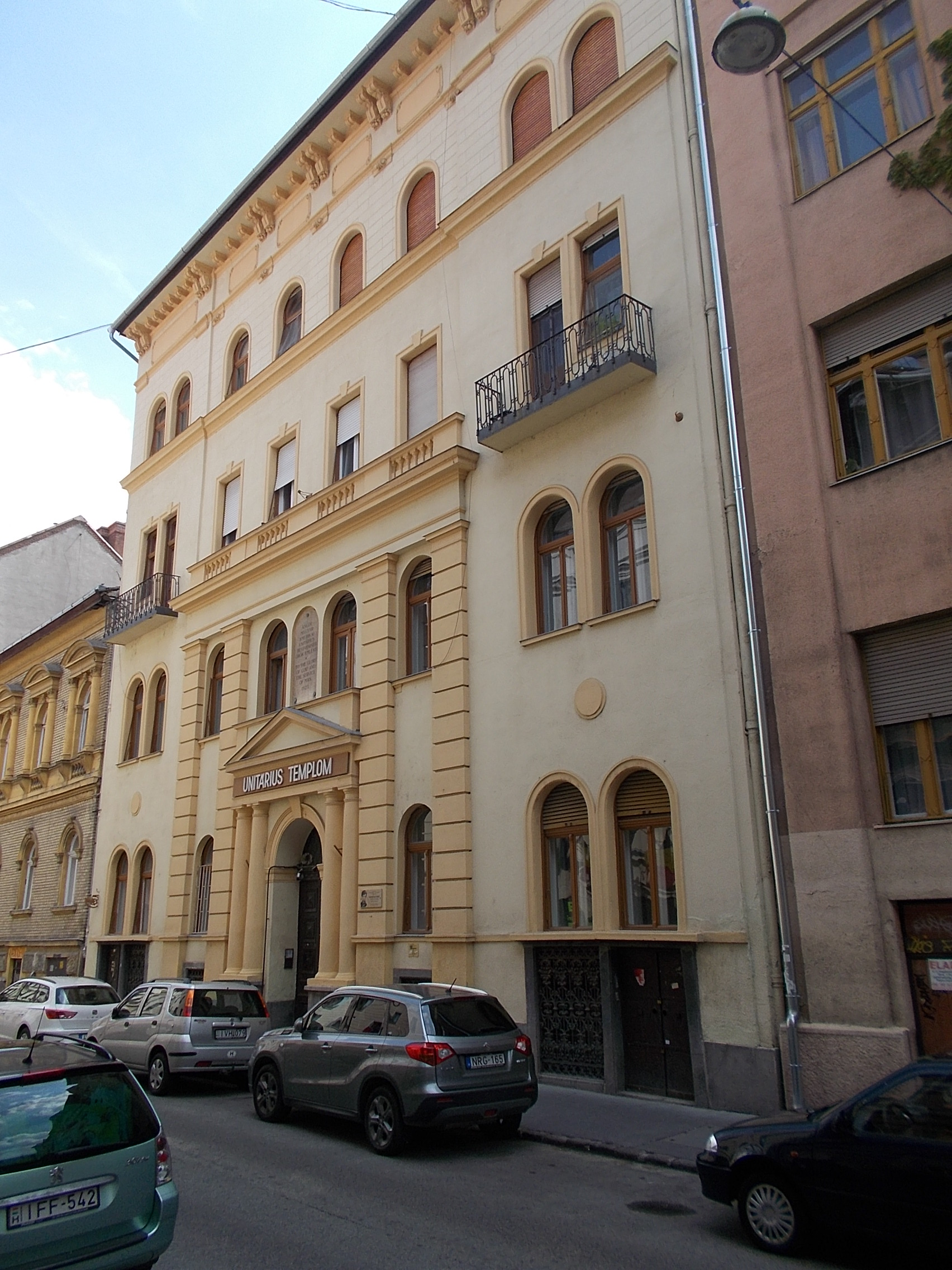
| Picture | Name | Construction time | Architectural style | Designer | Address, comments |
|---|---|---|---|---|---|
| | Bartók Béla Unitárius Egyházközség temploma | 1923–1929 | n. a. | n. a. | 1092 Budapest, Hőgyes Endre u. 3. |

=== Orthodox churches ===
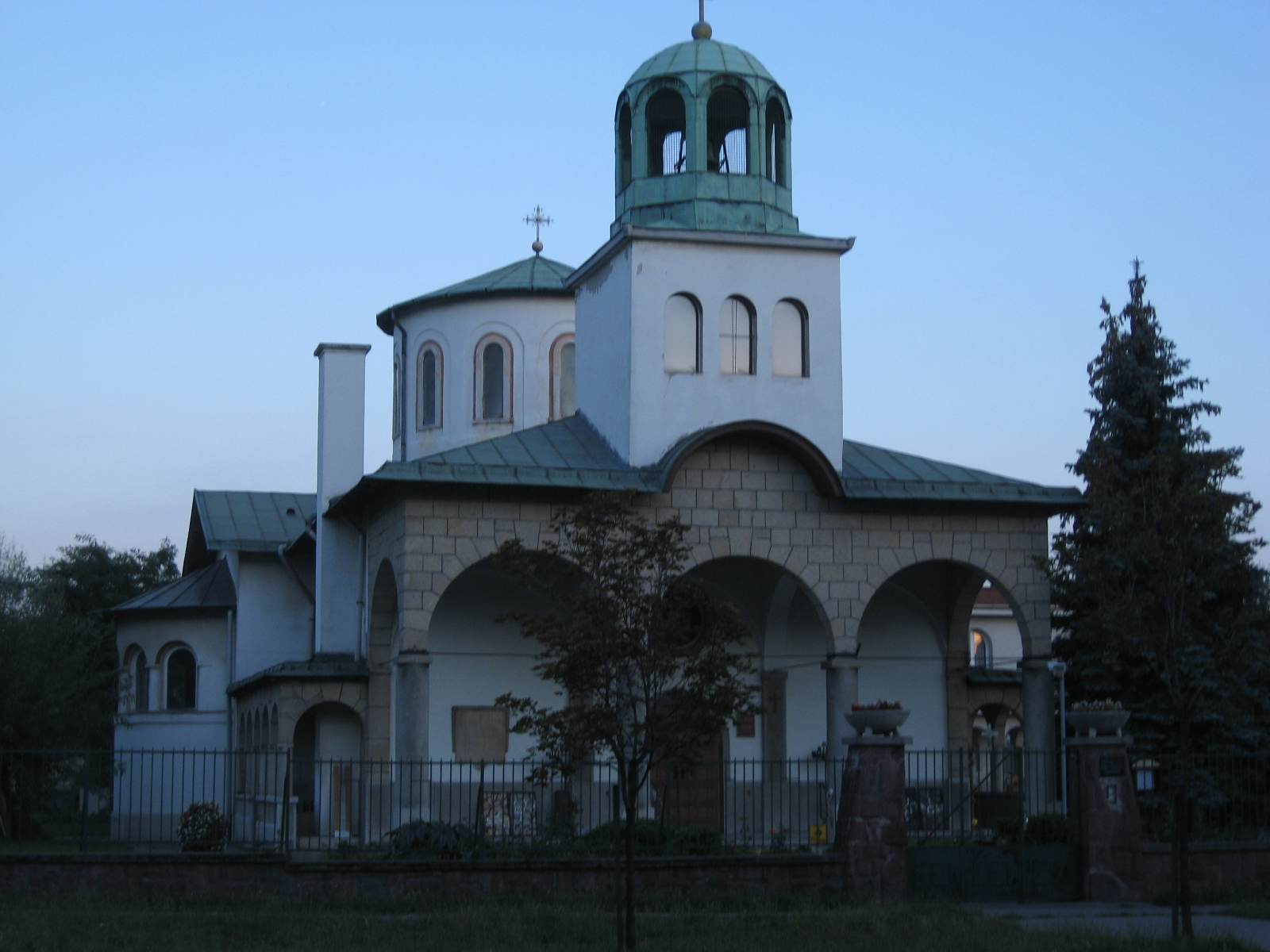
| Picture | Name | Construction time | Architectural style | Designer | Address, comments |
|---|---|---|---|---|---|
| | Szent Cirill és Szent Metód Bolgár Pravoszláv templom | 1931 | historicizing early modern | Árkay Aladár | 1097 Budapest, Vágóhíd u. 15. |

=== Other churches ===
| Picture | Name | Construction time | Architectural style | Designer | Address, comments |
|---|---|---|---|---|---|
| | Ferencvárosi Forrás Gyülekezet imaháza | 20th century | n. a. | n. a. | 1098 Budapest, Toronyház u. 3/b. Baptist house of worship. |
| | Új Élet Gyülekezet imaháza | 20th century | n. a. | n. a. | 1098 Budapest, Toronyház u. 3/b. Pentecostal house of prayer. |

== District X ==
=== Roman Catholic churches ===
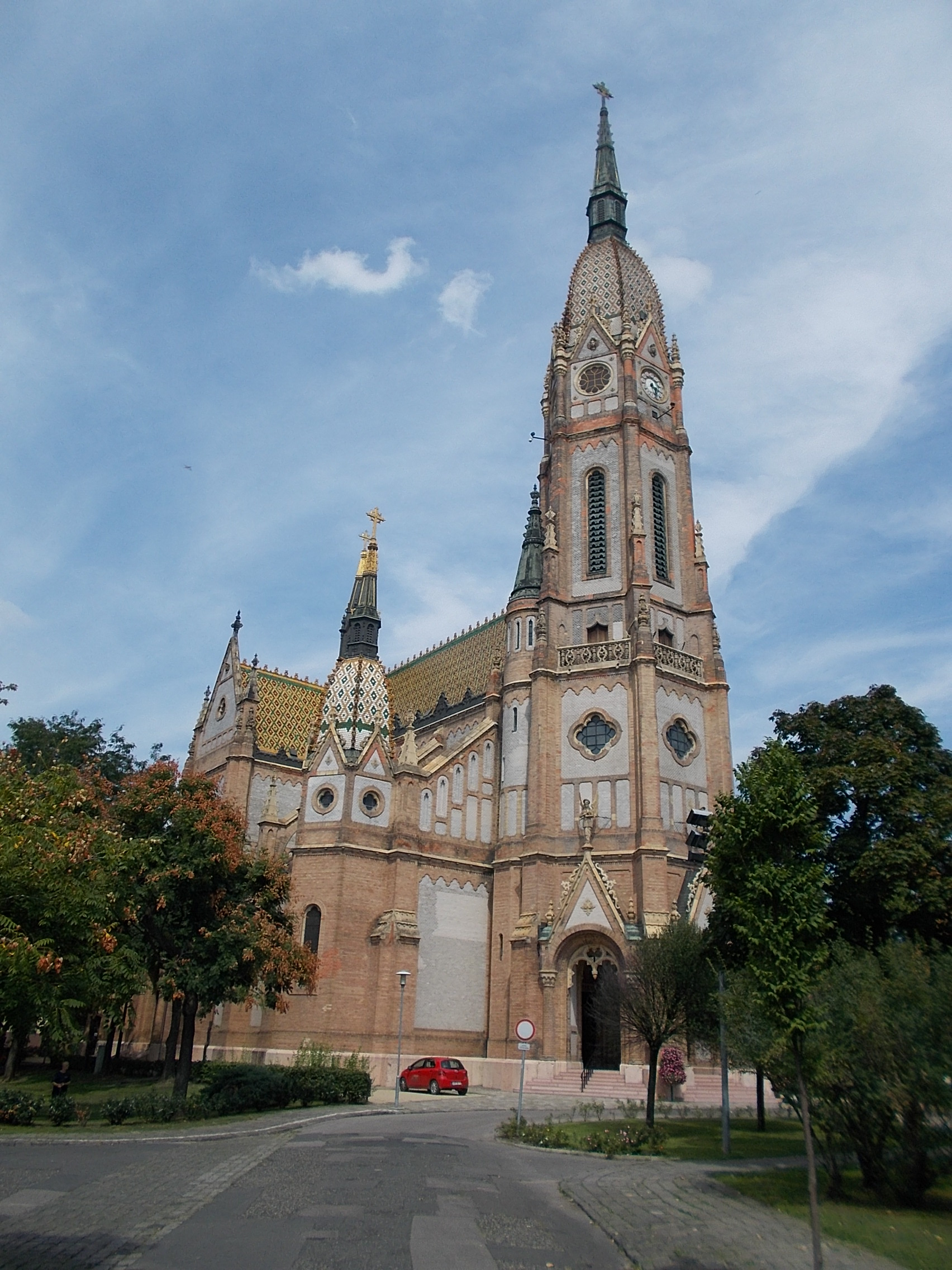
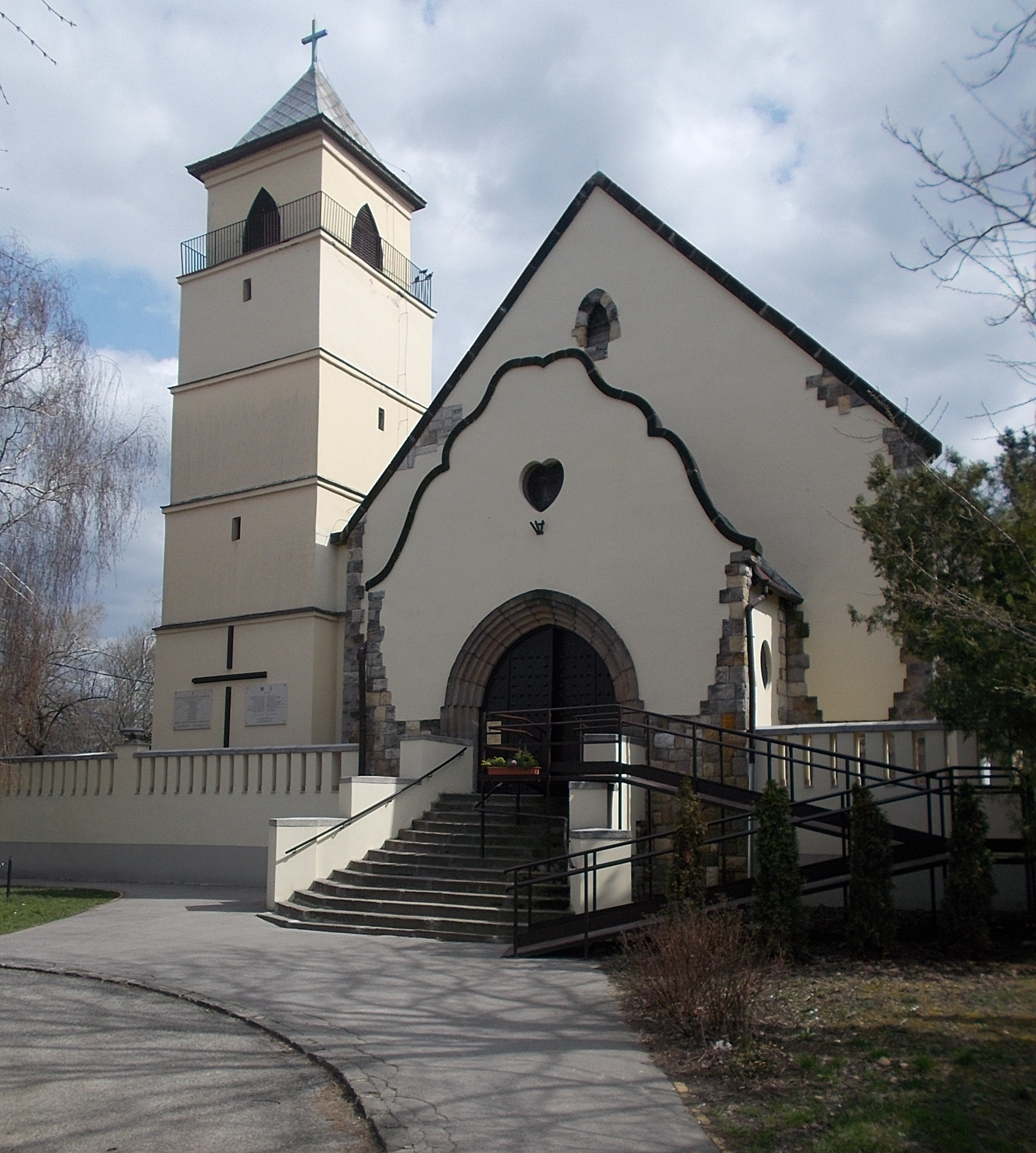
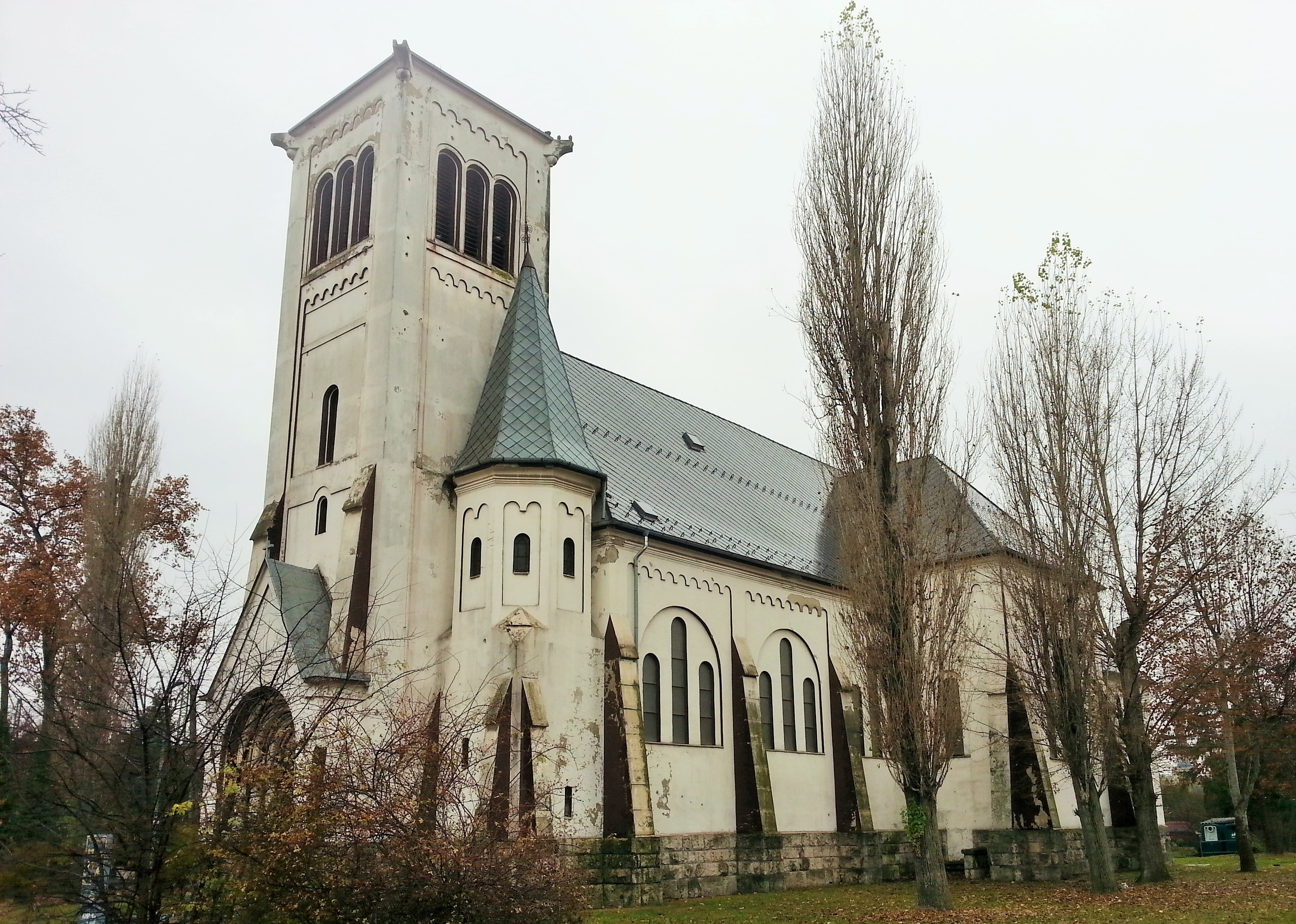
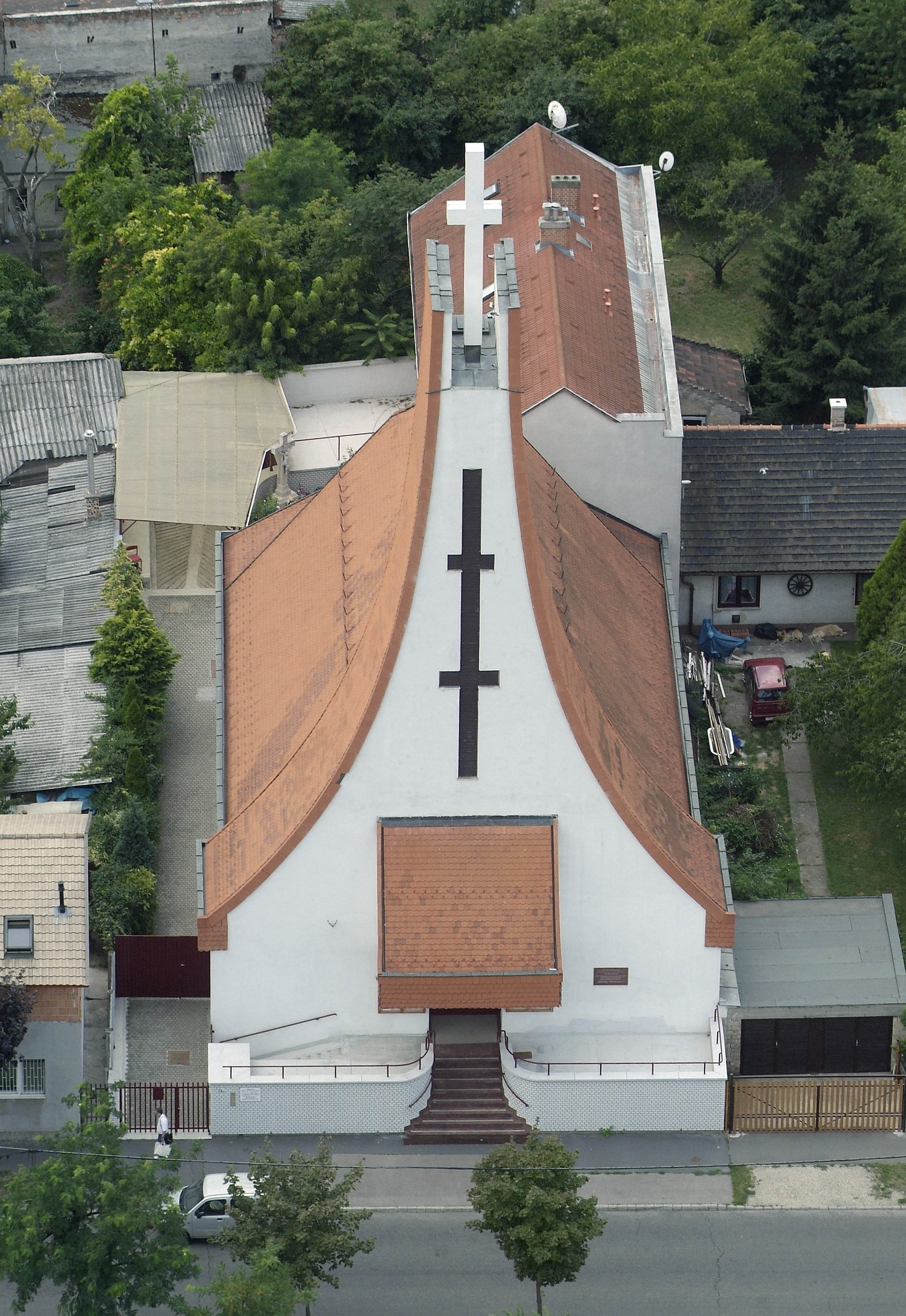
| Picture | Name | Construction time | Architectural style | Designer | Address, comments |
|---|---|---|---|---|---|
| | Szent László-templom | 1894–1899 | Art Nouveau | Lechner Ödön | 1102 Budapest, Szent László tér 25. |
| | Pongrác úti Föltámadott Krisztus templom | 1925 | Hungarian folk (?) | Martsekényi Imre | 1101 Budapest, Kistorony park |
| | Lengyel nemzetiségi templom | 1925–1930 | Art Nouveau | Árkay Aladár | 1103 Budapest, Óhegy u. 11. |
| | Kőbánya-MÁV-telepi Kisboldogasszony-templom | 1930–1931 | neo-romanesque | Dusek Ede, Horesnyi József | 1087 Budapest, Tbiliszi tér 1. |
| | Külső Kőbányai Szent Család templom | 1938 előtt | n. a. | n. a. | 1103 Budapest, Kada u. 5. The church was built in 1938 in a school building. |
| | Kőbányai Szent György templom | 1990–1994 | n. a. | n. a. | 1104 Budapest, Sörgyár u. 73/A. |
| | Árpád-házi Szent Erzsébet kórházkápolna | 2014 | modern | Temesvári Lászlóné | 1106 Budapest, Maglódi út 89–91. It was built in Bajcsy-Zsilinszky Hospital. |

=== Greek Catholic churches ===
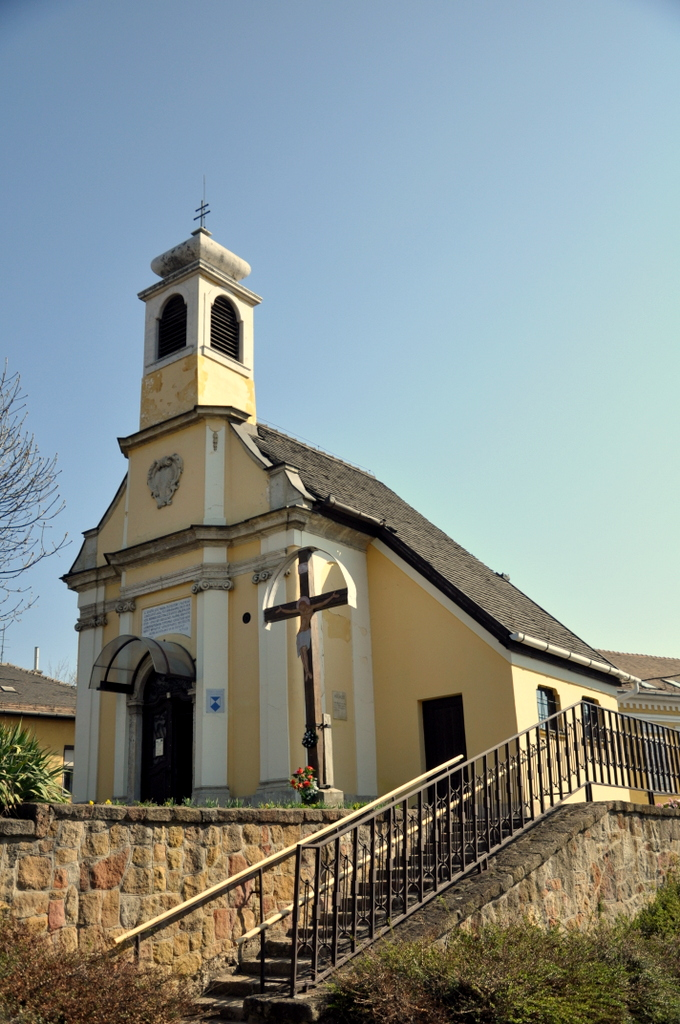
| Picture | Name | Construction time | Architectural style | Designer | Address, comments |
|---|---|---|---|---|---|
| | Conti-kápolna | 1739–1740 | baroque | n. a. | 1103 Budapest, Kápolna tér. |

=== Reformed churches ===
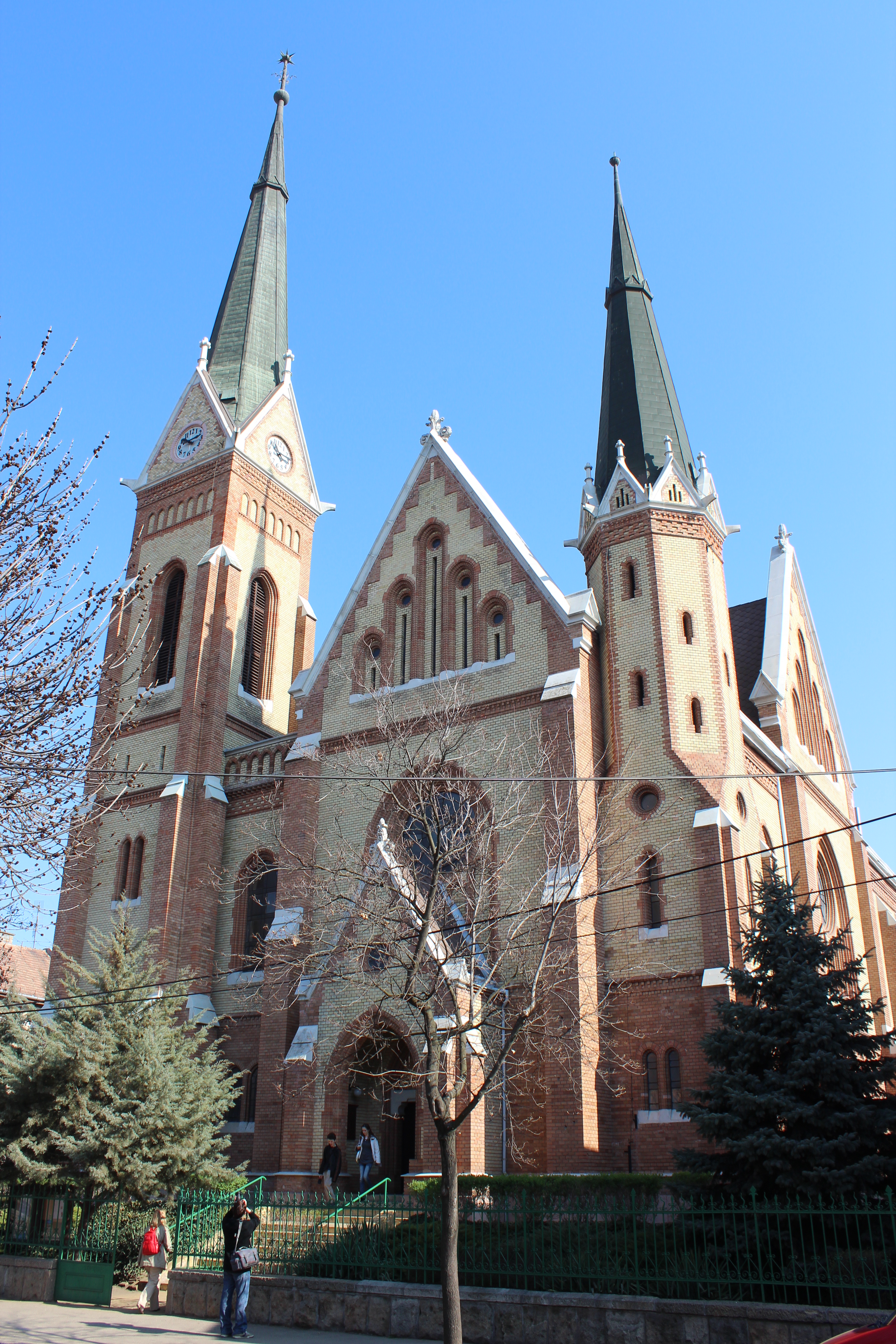
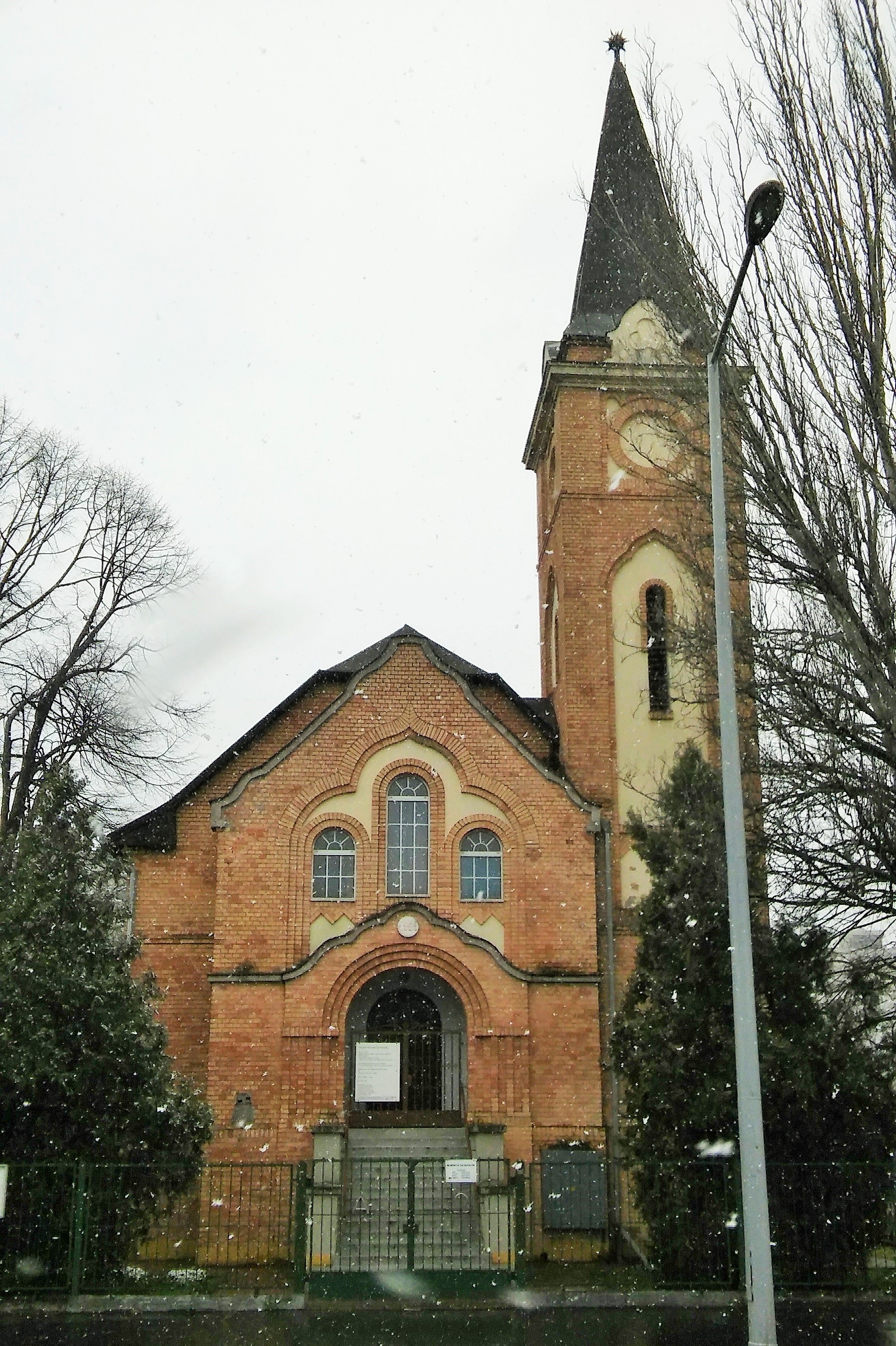
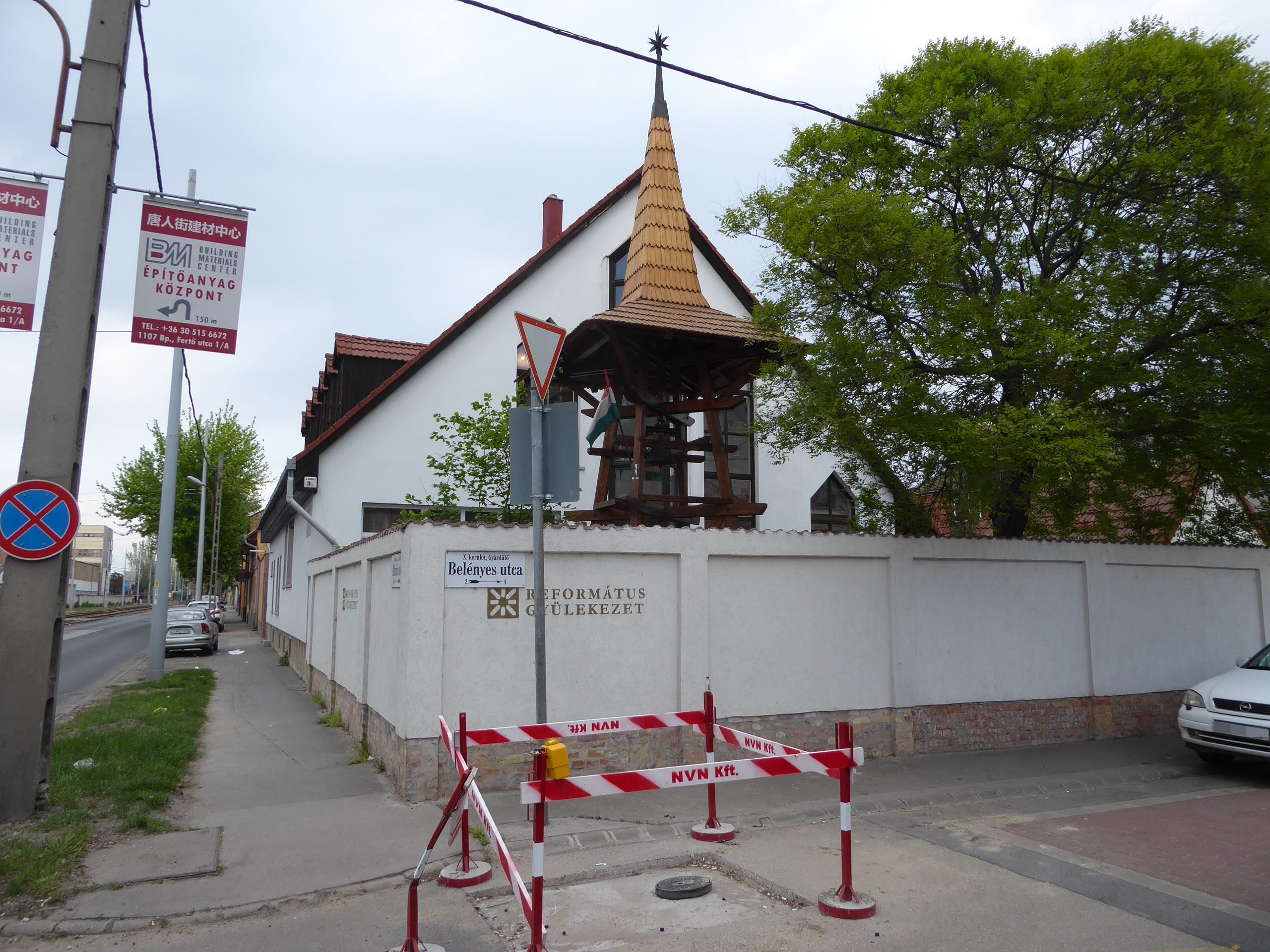
| Picture | Name | Construction time | Architectural style | Designer | Address, comments |
|---|---|---|---|---|---|
| | Kőbányai református templom | 1900 | neogothic | Schodits Lajos | 1105 Budapest, Ihász u. 15. |
| | Rákosfalvai református templom | 1928–1929 | neo-romanesque | Pucher József | 1106 Budapest, Kerepesi út 69. |
| | Külső-Üllői úti református templom | n. a. | n. a. | n. a. | 1107 Budapest, Belényes u. 2. |

=== Evangelical churches ===
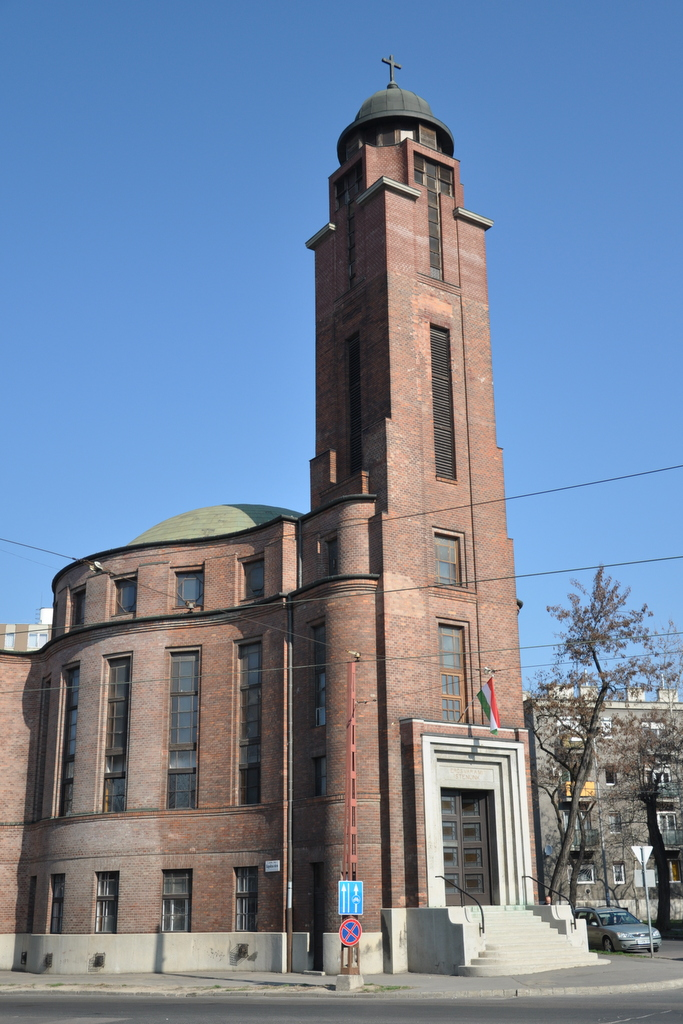
| Picture | Name | Construction time | Architectural style | Designer | Address, comments |
|---|---|---|---|---|---|
| | Kőbányai evangélikus templom | 1930–1931 | Art Déco | Frecska János | 1105 Budapest, Kápolna u. 14. |

=== Other churches ===
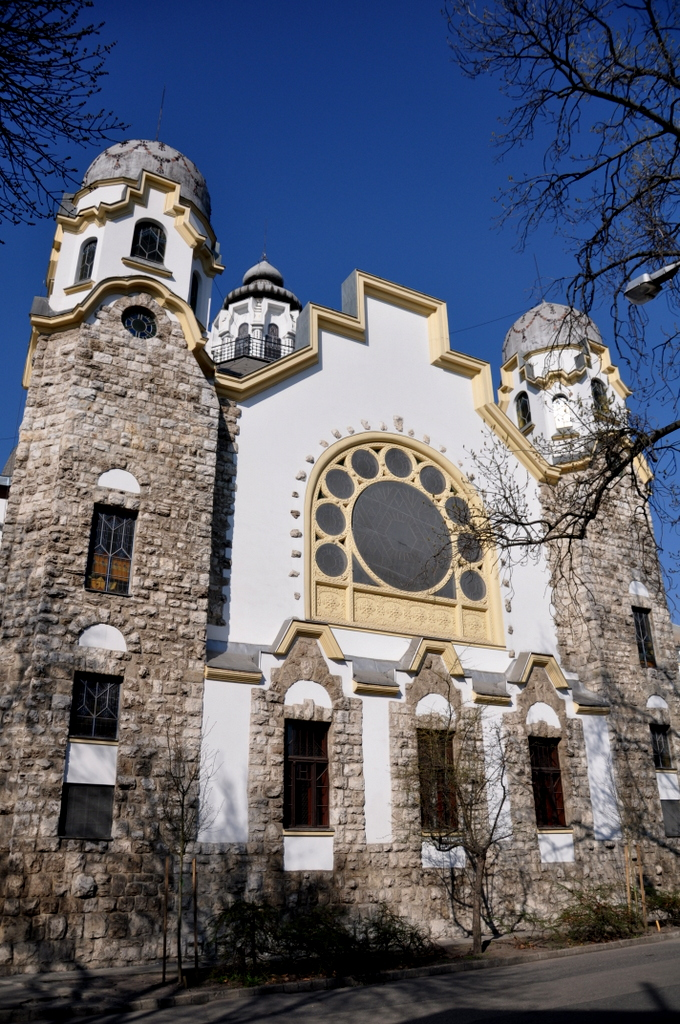
| Picture | Name | Construction time | Architectural style | Designer | Address, comments |
|---|---|---|---|---|---|
| | Mindenki Temploma | 1909–1912 | Art Nouveau | Schöntheil Richárd | 1105 Budapest, Cserkesz u. 7–9. It used to be a synagogue, today it is an ecumenical church. |
| | Kőbányai adventista imaház | 20th century | n. a. | n. a. | 1102 Budapest, Állomás u. 5. |

== District XI ==
=== Roman Catholic churches ===
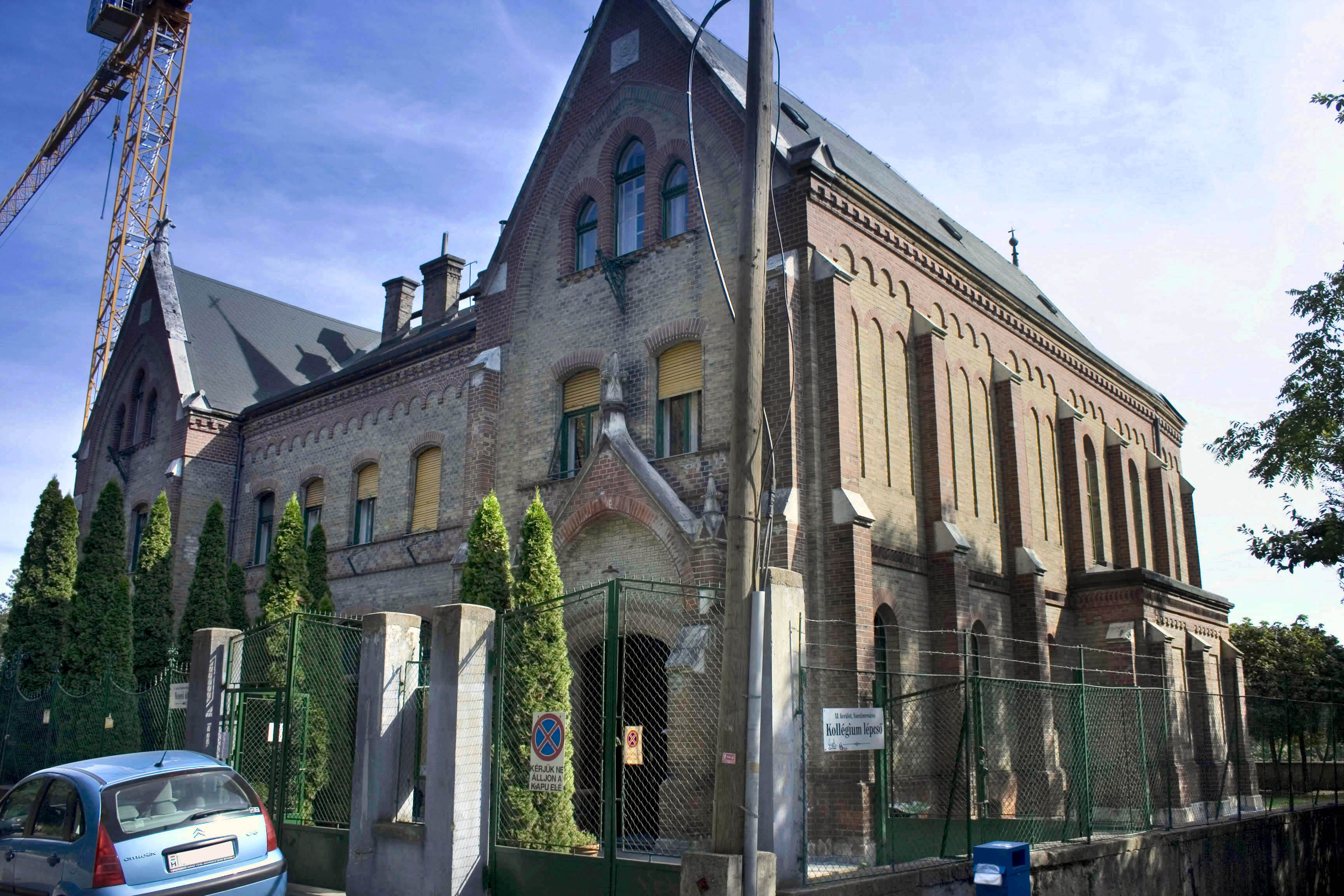
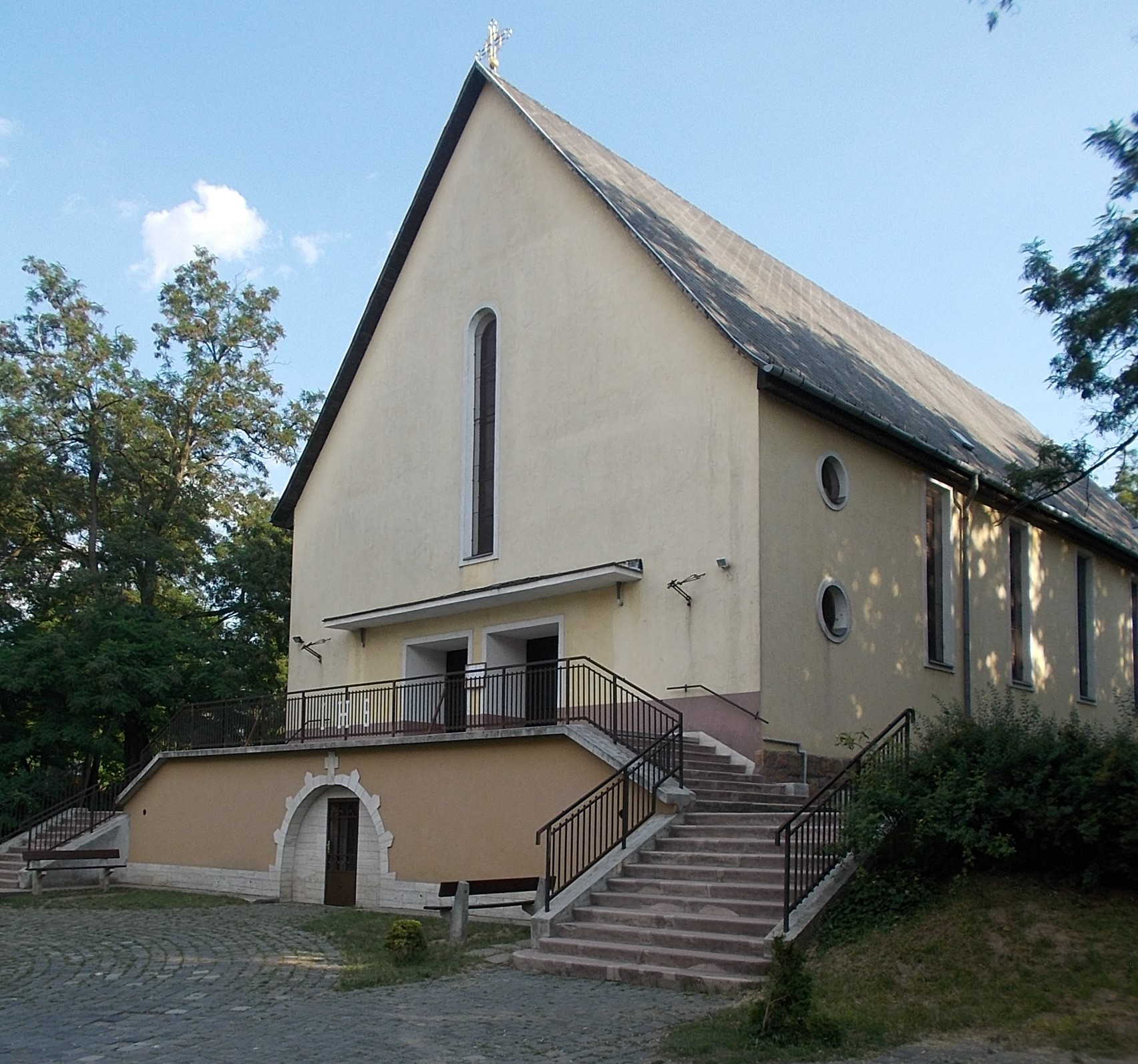
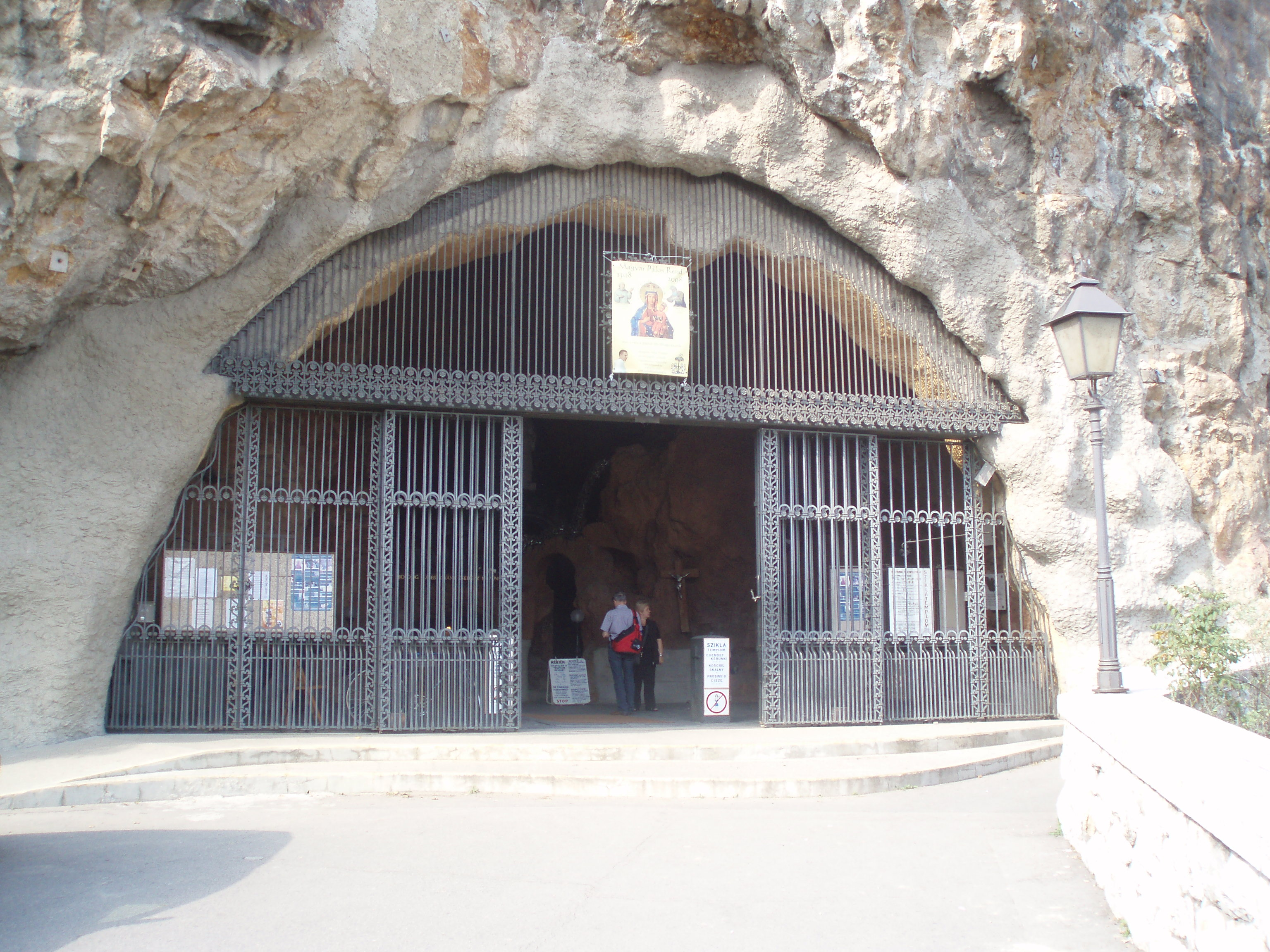
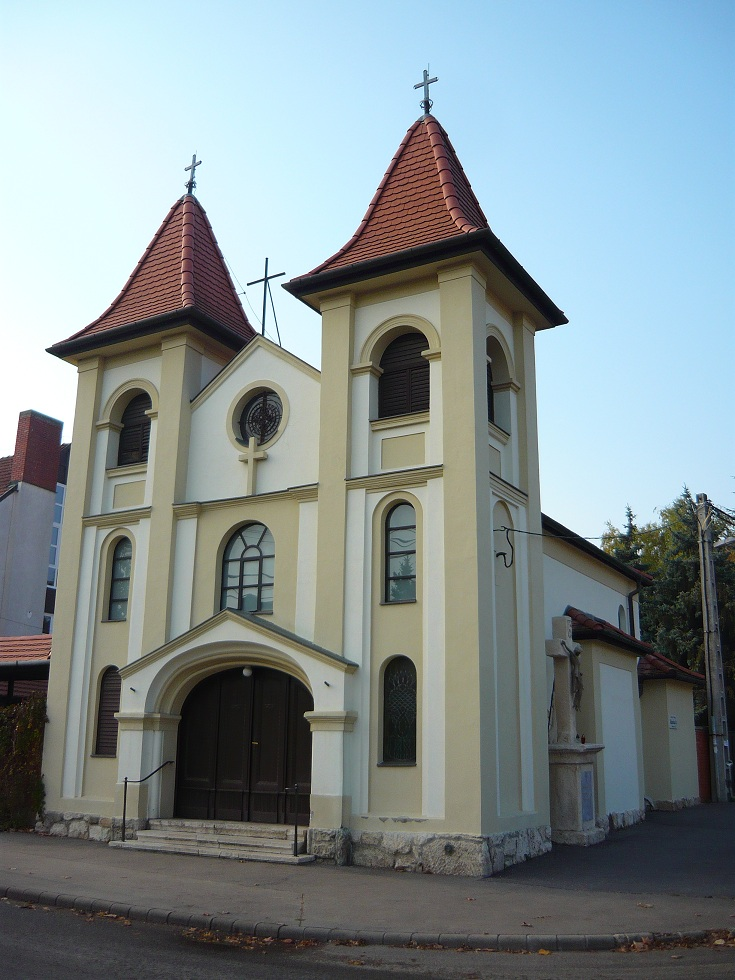
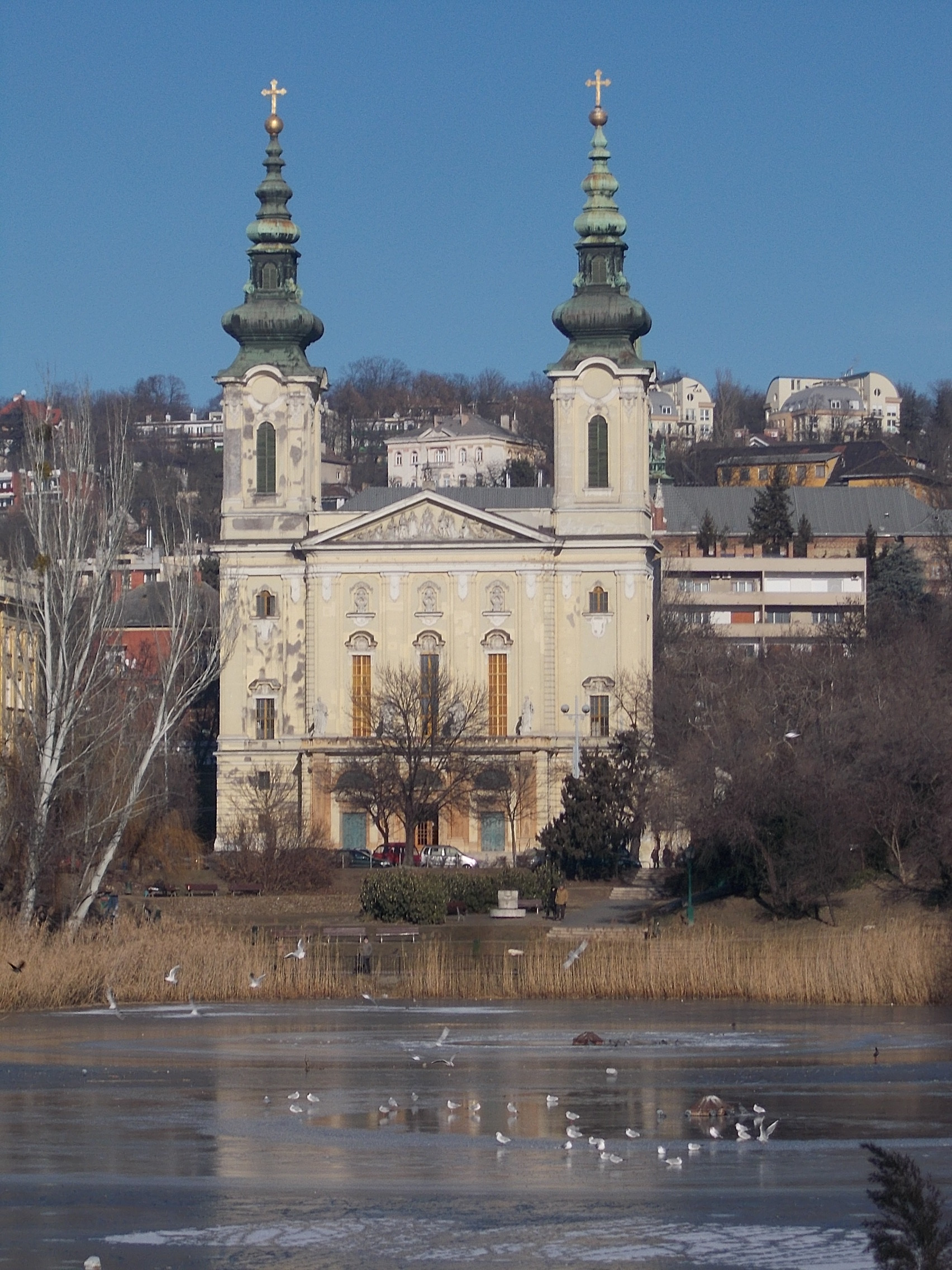
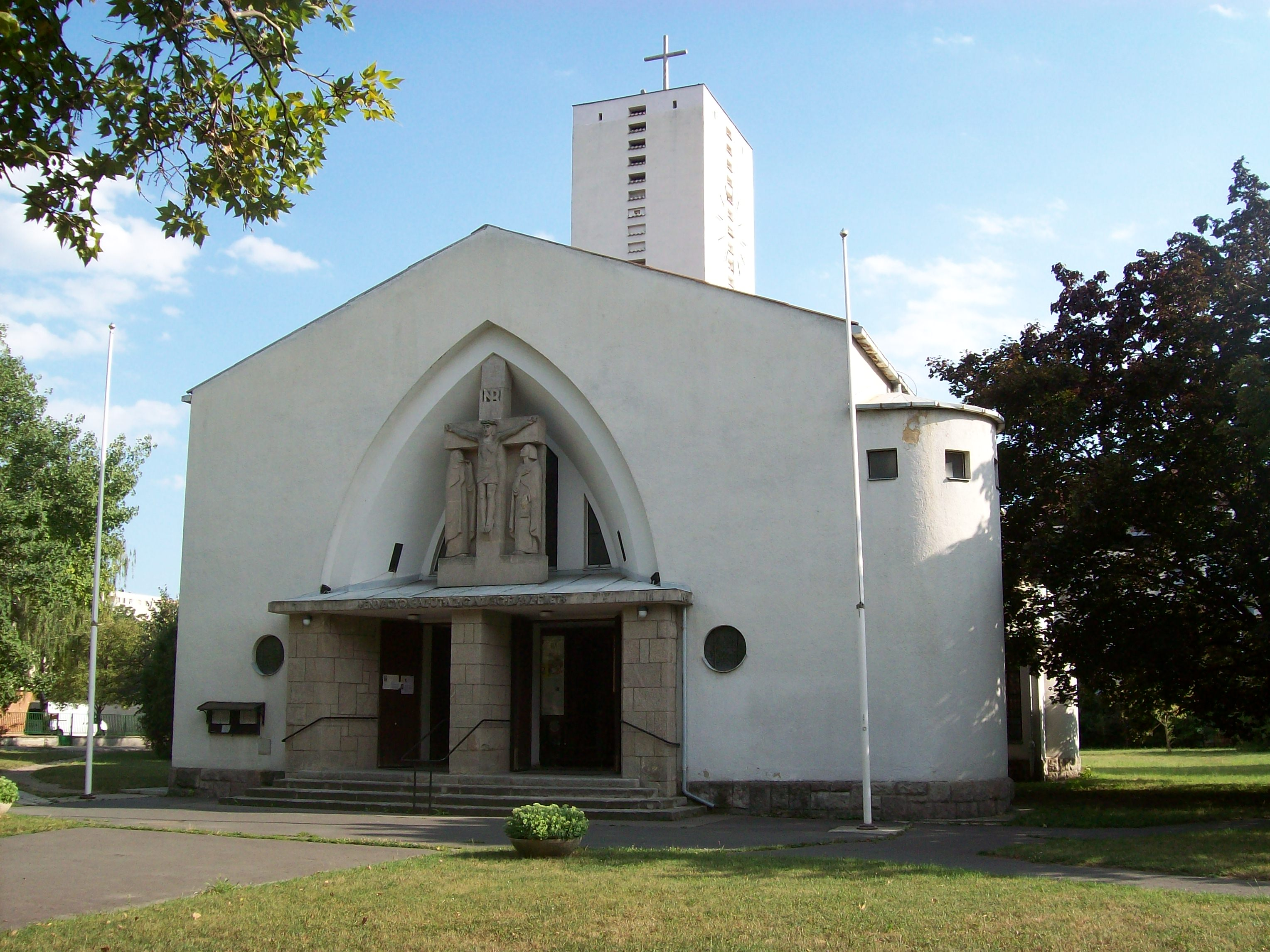
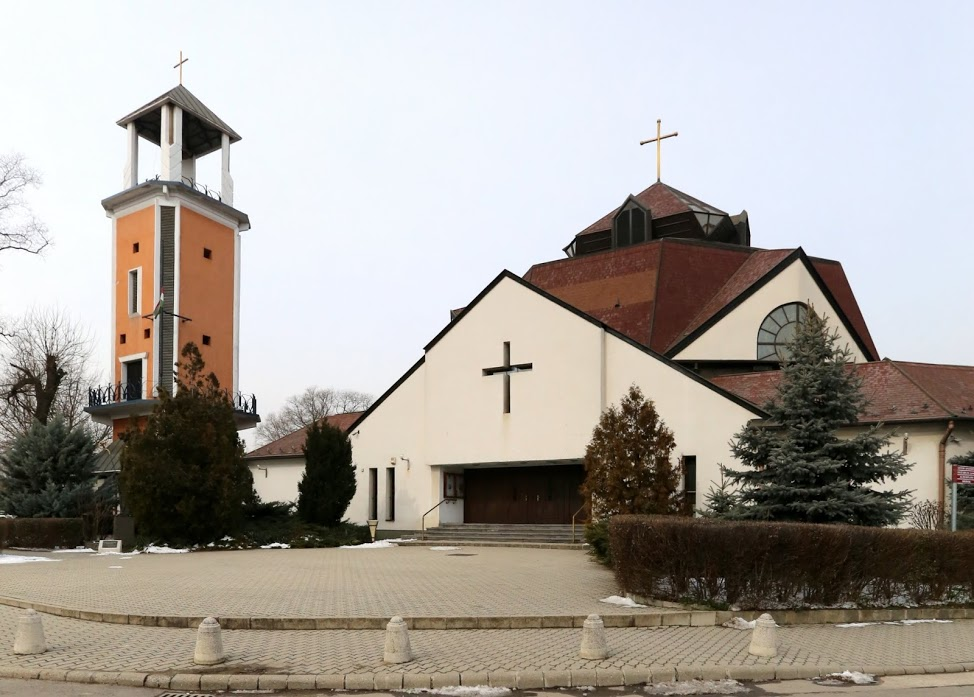
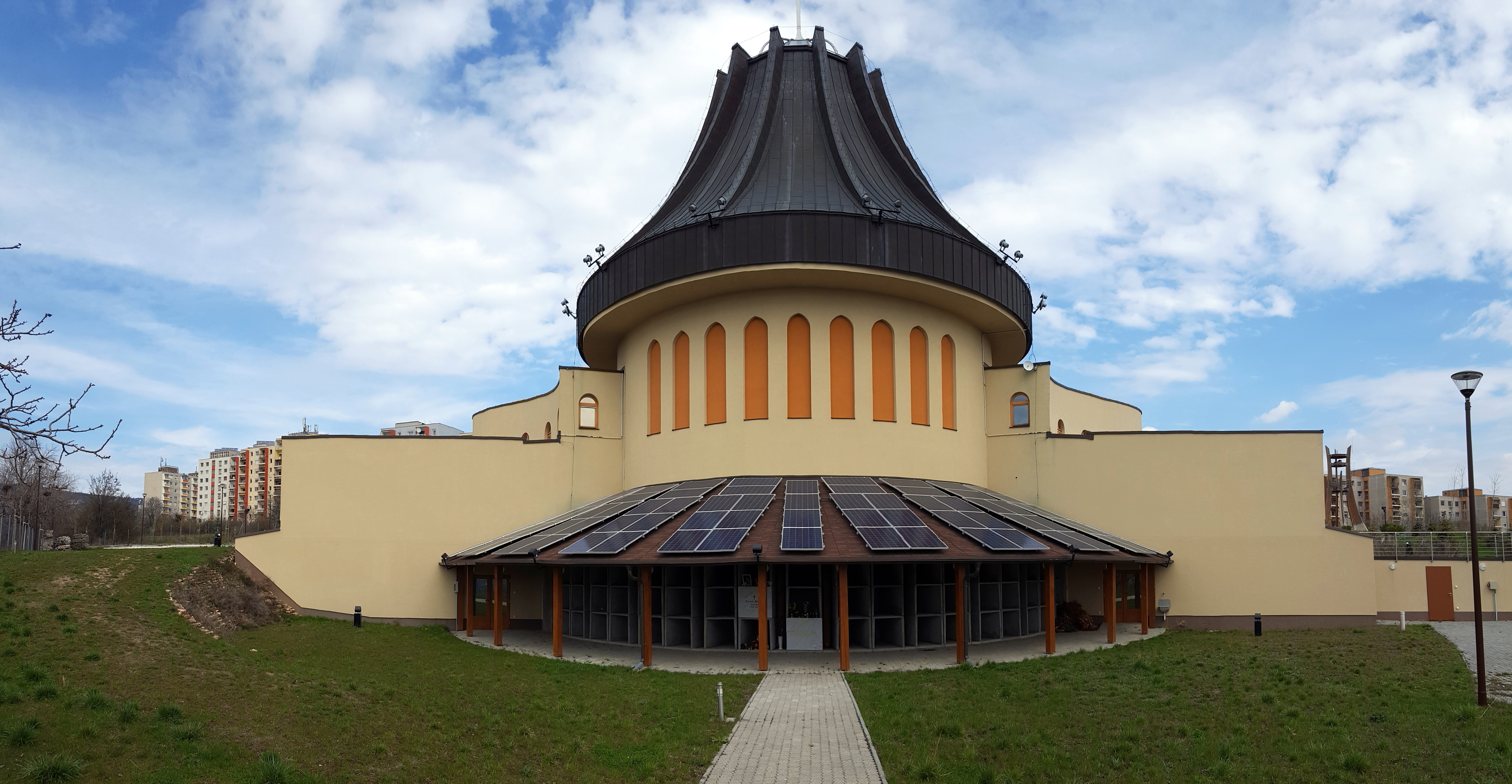
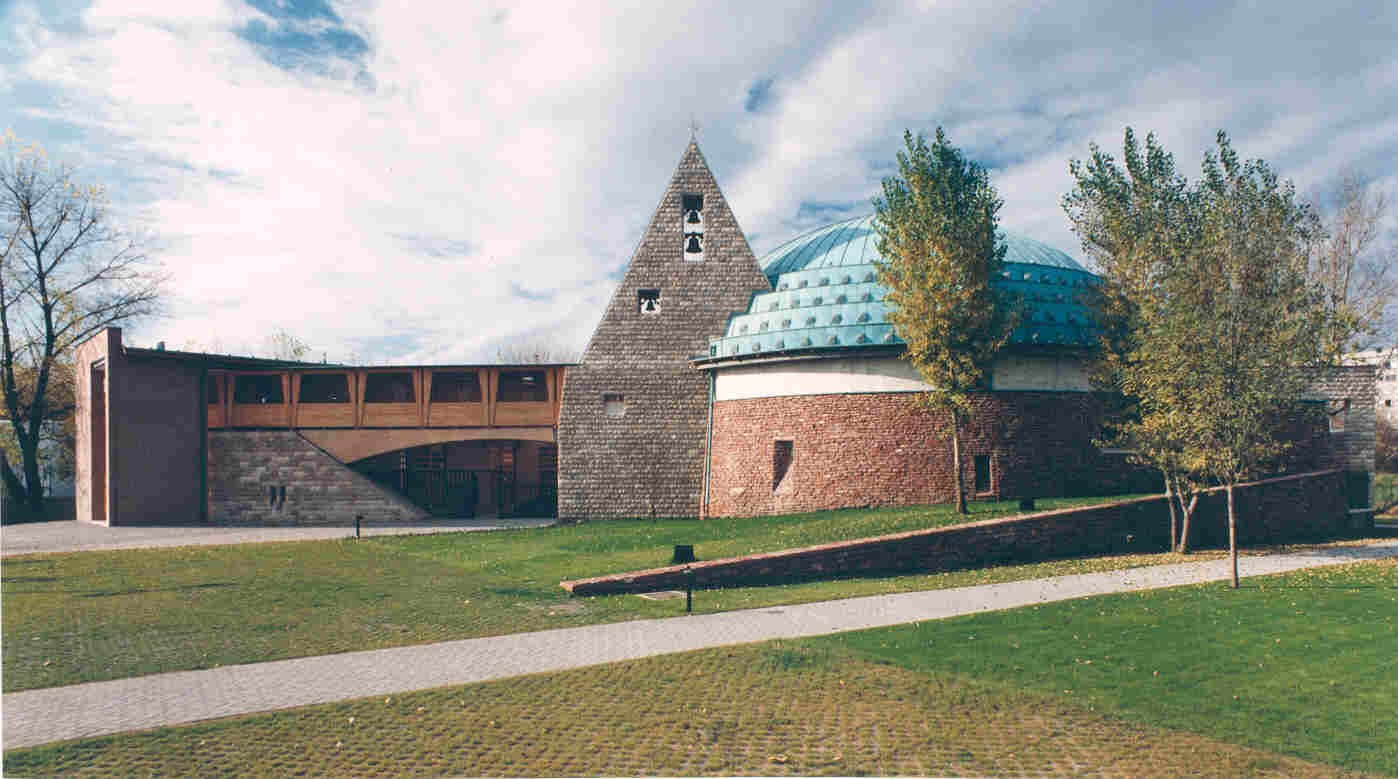
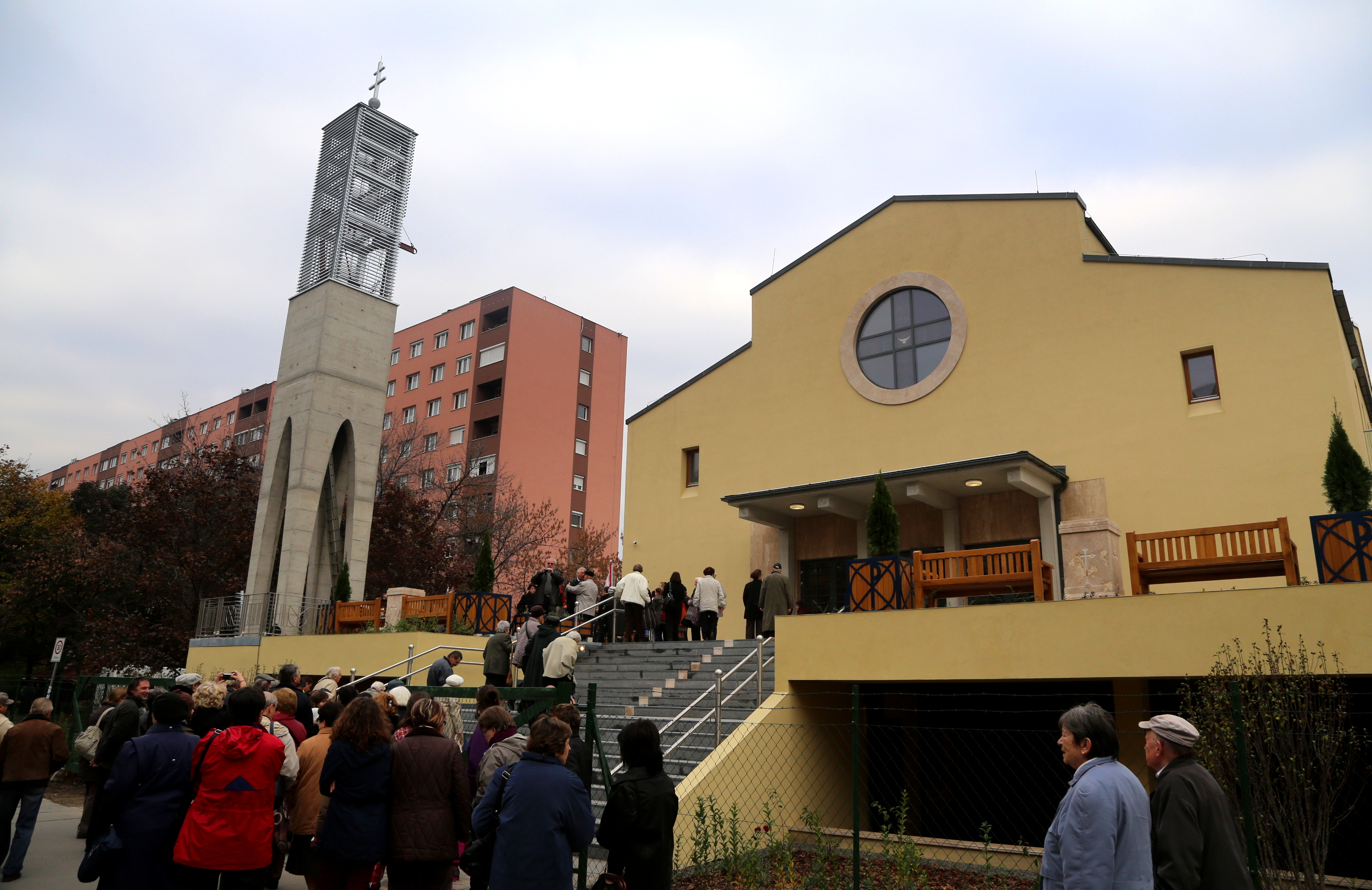
| Picture | Name | Construction time | Architectural style | Designer | Address, comments |
|---|---|---|---|---|---|
| | Szent Gellért lazarista kápolna | 1910 | neogothic | Szuchy János | 1118 Budapest, Ménesi út 26. |
| | Kelenvölgyi Szentháromság Plébániatemplom | 1931 | n. a. | n. a. | 1116 Budapest, Kecskeméti József utca 16–20. |
| | Magyarok Nagyasszonya-sziklatemplom | 1931 | n. a. | Lux Kálmán | 1114 Budapest, Szent Gellért rakpart 1. It was built inside Gellért Hill. |
| | Szent Szabina-kápolna | 1934 | n. a. | n. a. | 1012 Budapest, Péterhegyi út. 67. |
| | Budai ciszterci Szent Imre-templom | 1938 | neo-baroque | Wälder Gyula | 1114 Budapest, Villányi út 25. |
| | Albertfalvai Szent Mihály templom | 1941 | n. a. | n. a. | 1116 Budapest, Bükköny u. 3. |
| | Karolina úti Gyümölcsoltó Boldogasszony kápolna | before 1985 | n. a. | n. a. | 1113 Budapest, Bocskai út 67. It was arranged in a residential house. |
| | Kelenföldi Szent Gellért-plébánia | 1984–1992 | modern | András Kiss | 1115 Budapest, Bartók Béla út 149. |
| | Gazdagréti Szent Angyalok-templom | 1994–2002 | n. a. | Koppányi Imre | 1112 Budapest, Gazdagréti út 14. |
| | Magyar Szentek temploma | 1996 | n. a. | Török Ferenc, Balázs Mihály | 1117 Budapest, Magyar Tudósok Körútja 1. |
| | Lágymányosi Szent Adalbert-plébánia | 2013–2014 | modern | Jahoda Róbert | 1116 Budapest, Fehérvári út 88. |
| | Szent Kozma és Damján kórházkápolna | 2005 | n. a. | n. a. | 1122 Budapest, Ráth György u. 7–9. It was built on the site of a previously demolished hospital chapel. |
| | Bartók Béla úti Szent Imre kápolna | n. a. | n. a. | n. a. | 1114 Budapest, Bartók Béla út 19. |
| | Ulászló utcai Szent Lélek kápolna | n. a. | n. a. | n. a. | 1114 Budapest, Ulászló u. 15. |
| | Felsőlágymányosi Szent Tádé kápolna | n. a. | n. a. | n. a. | 1117 Budapest, Magyar tudósok körútja 1. |

=== Armenian Catholic churches ===
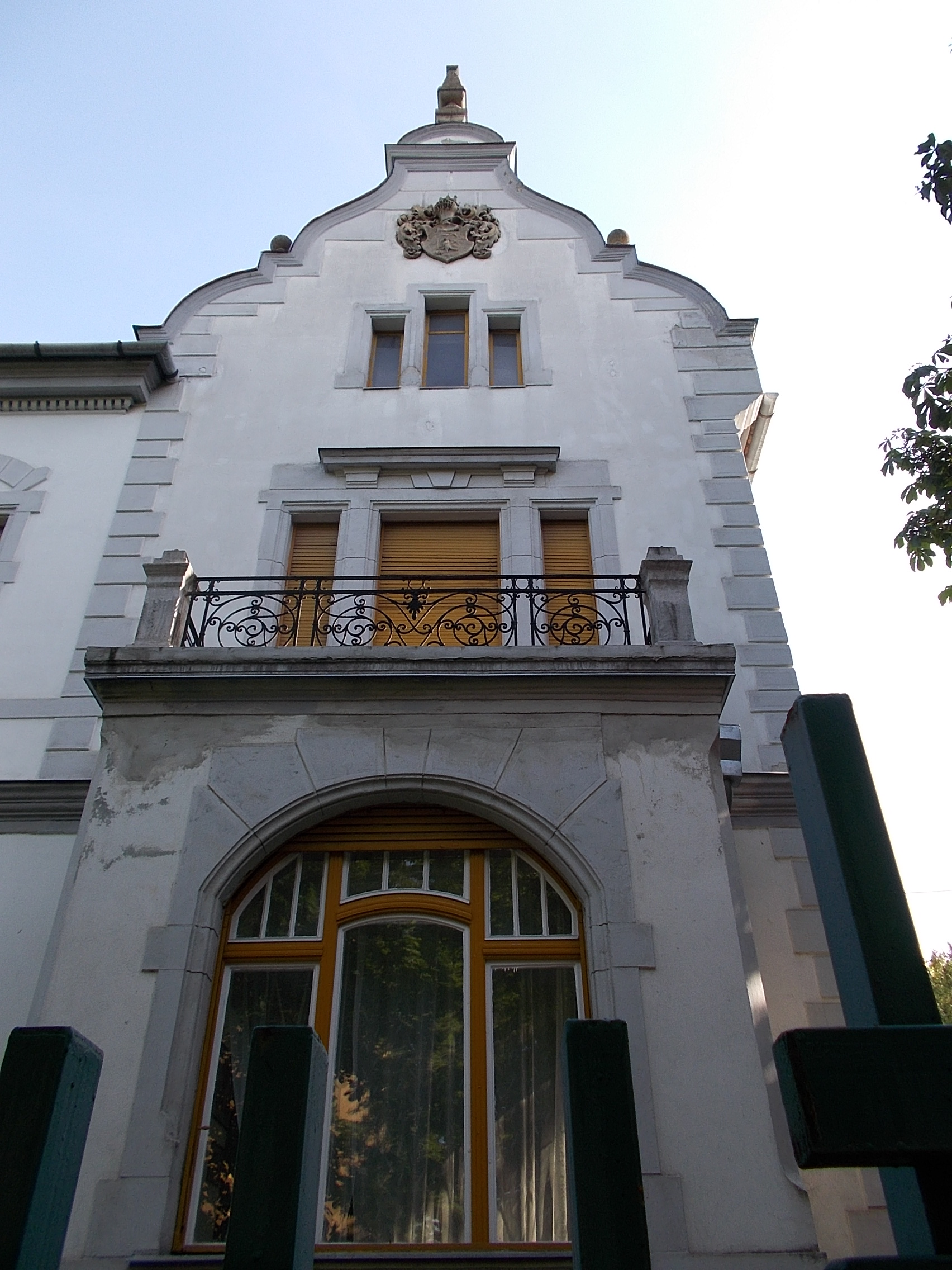
| Picture | Name | Construction time | Architectural style | Designer | Address, comments |
|---|---|---|---|---|---|
| | Budapesti Fogolykiváltó Boldogasszony és Világosító Szent Gergely örmény katolikus templom | 1973 | n. a. | n. a. | 1114 Budapest, Orlay u. 6. |

=== Reformed churches ===
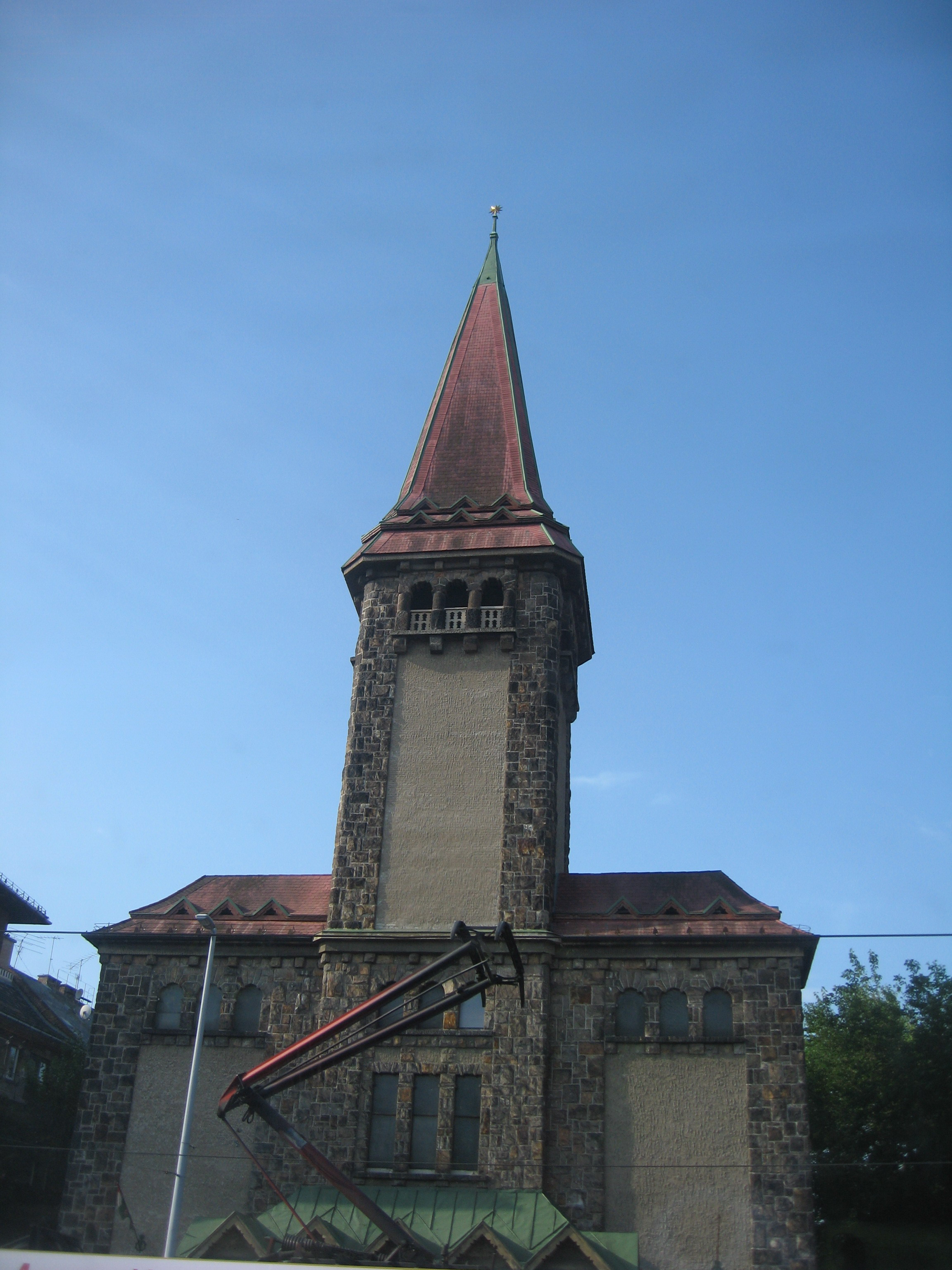
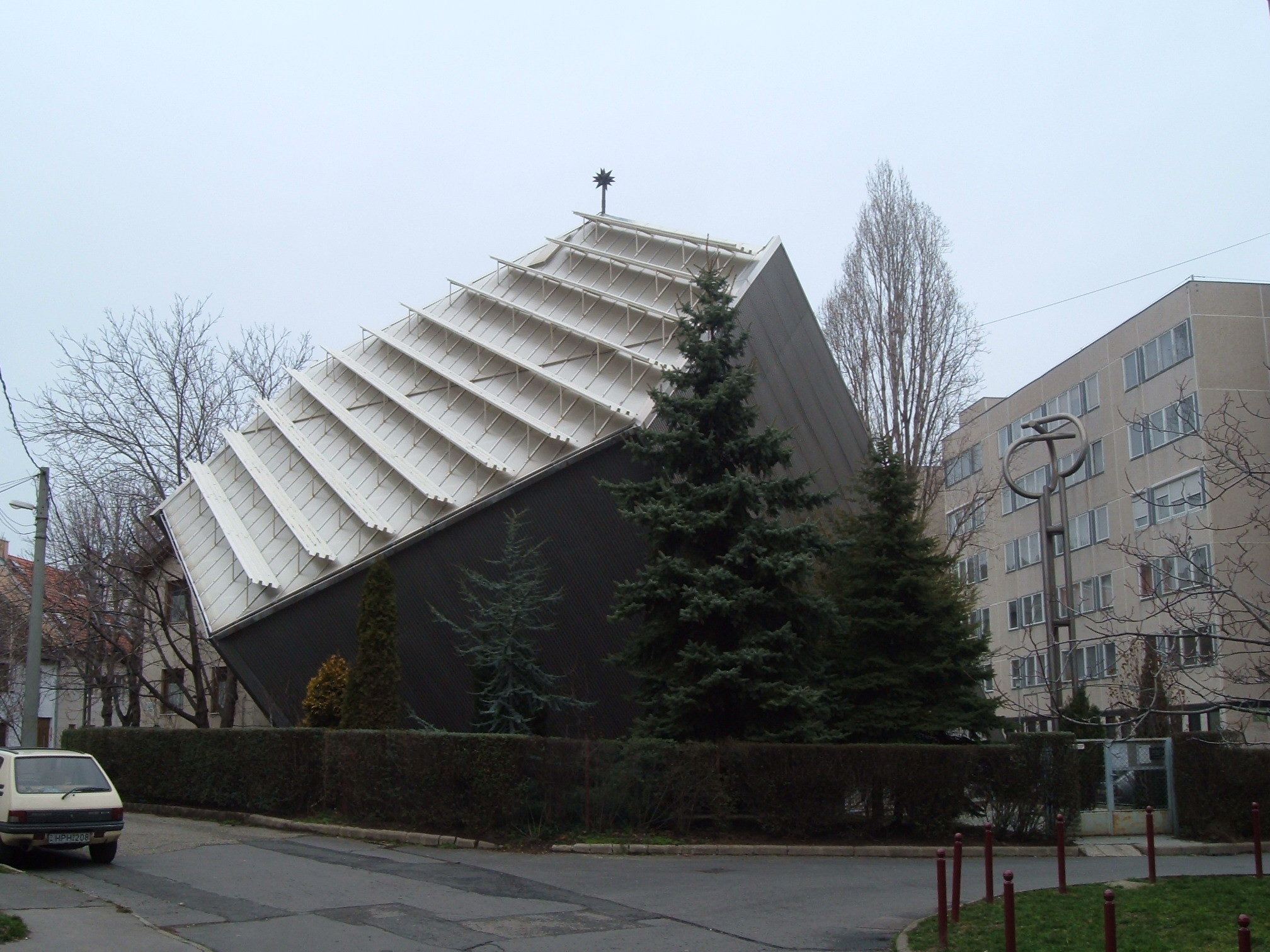
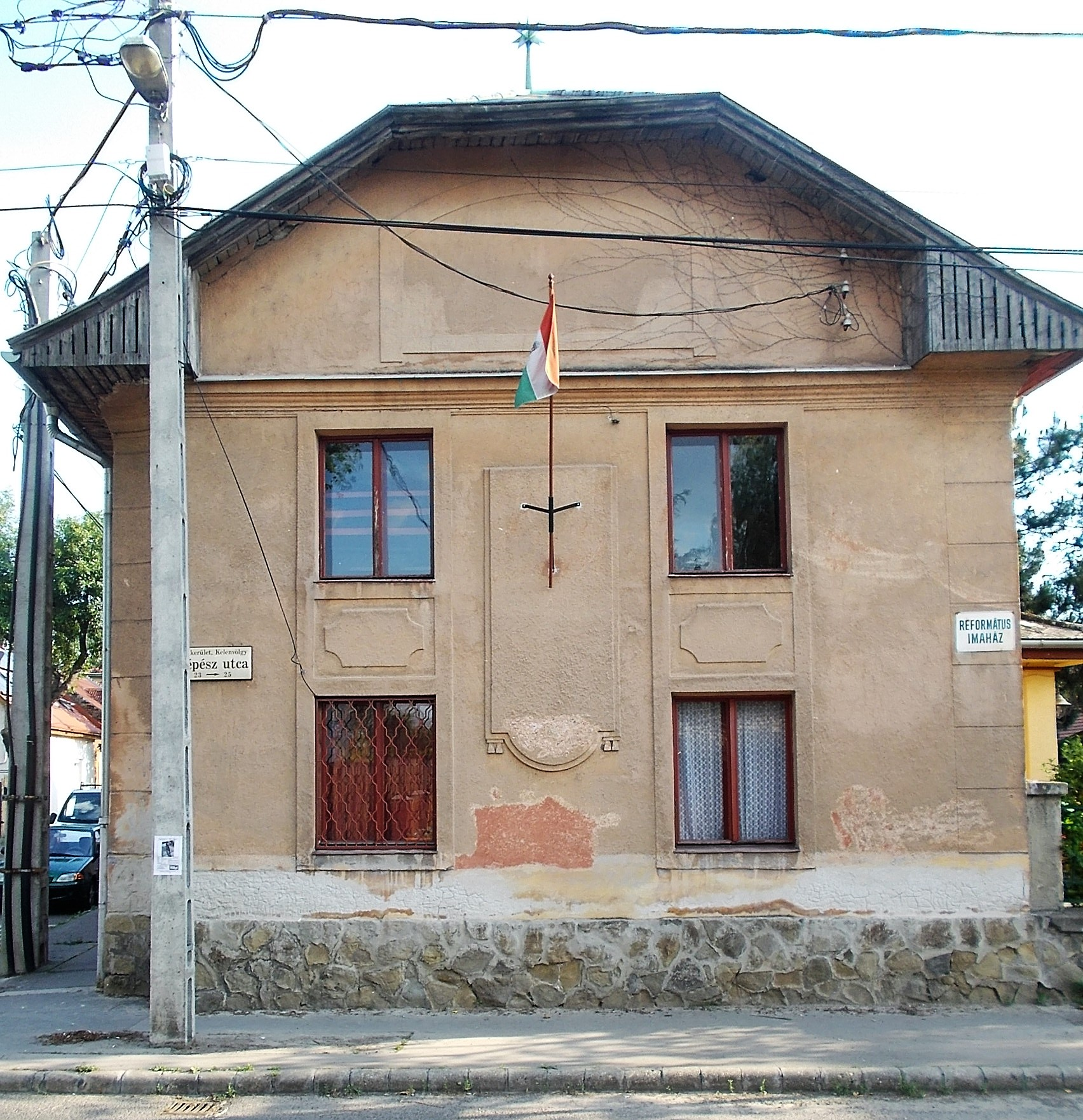
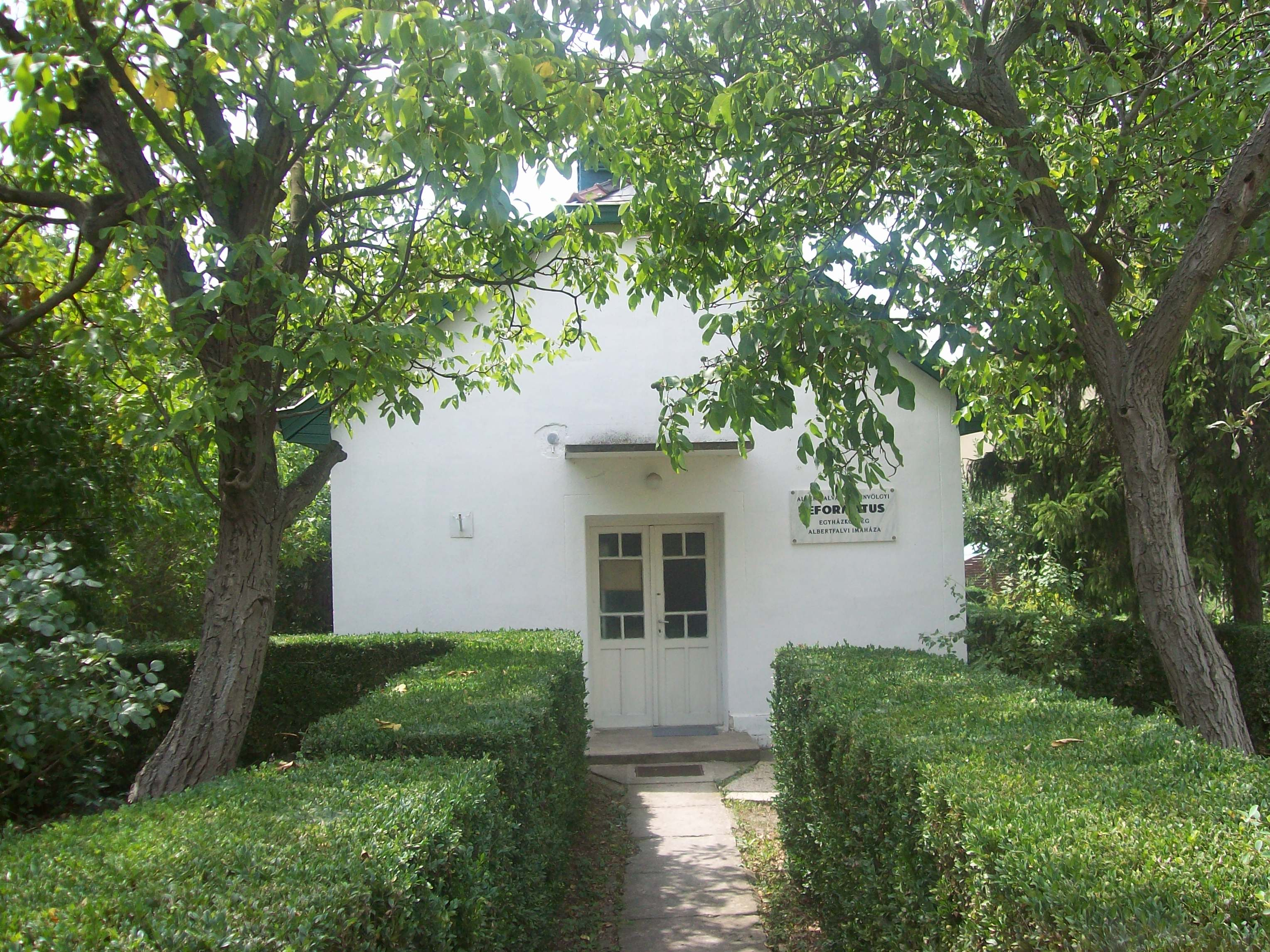
| Picture | Name | Construction time | Architectural style | Designer | Address, comments |
|---|---|---|---|---|---|
| | Kelenföldi református templom | 1928–1929 | Hungarian folk | Medgyaszay István | 1117 Budapest, Október 23. utca 5. |
| | Kelenföldi evangélikus és Külső-Kelenföldi református templom | 1979–1981 | modern | Szabó István | 1115 Budapest, Ildikó tér 1. The two churches share the church. |
| | Albertfalva-kelenvölgyi református imaház | 20th century | n. a. | n. a. | 1116 Budapest, Gépész u. 23. |
| | Gazdagréti református templom | 2004 | n. a. | n. a. | 1118 Budapest, Rétköz u. 41. |
| | Albertfalvi református imaház | n. a. | n. a. | n. a. | 1116 Budapest, Sáfrány u. 17. |

=== Evangelical churches ===
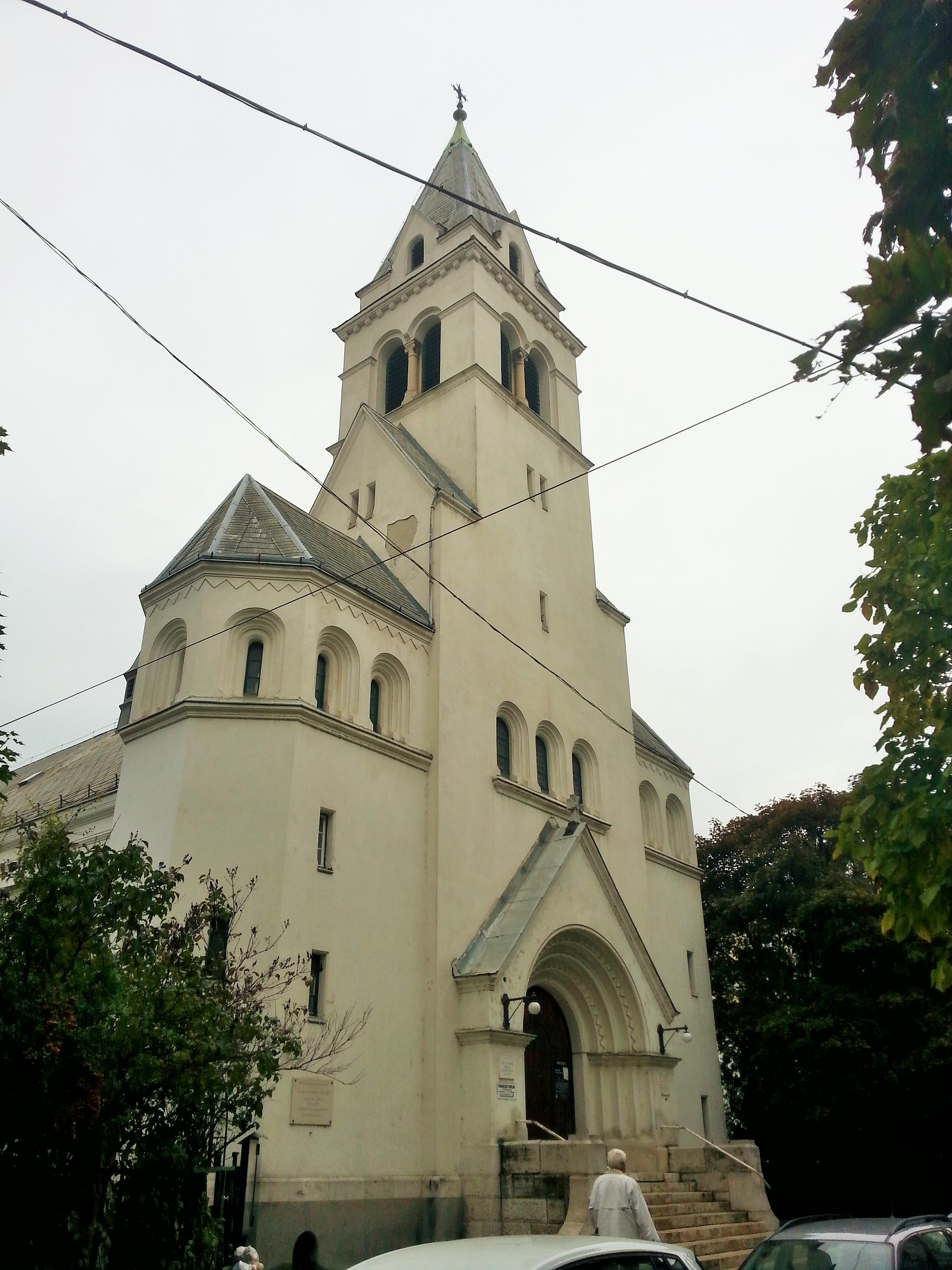
| Picture | Name | Construction time | Architectural style | Designer | Address, comments |
|---|---|---|---|---|---|
| | Kelenföldi evangélikus templom | 1926–1928 | neo-romanesque | Schulek János | 1114 Budapest, Magyari István u. 1–3. |

=== Other churches ===
| Picture | Name | Construction time | Architectural style | Designer | Address, comments |
|---|---|---|---|---|---|
| | Budai baptista kápolna | 1965 | n. a. | n. a. | 1118 Budapest, Alsóhegy u. 38. |
| | Budai adventista imaház | 20th century | n. a. | n. a. | 1118 Budapest, Szüret u. 19. |
| | Lágymányosi Ökumenikus Központ Egyetemi temploma | 2001 | n. a. | n. a. | 1117 Budapest, Magyar tudósok körútja 3. |

== District XII ==
=== Roman Catholic churches ===
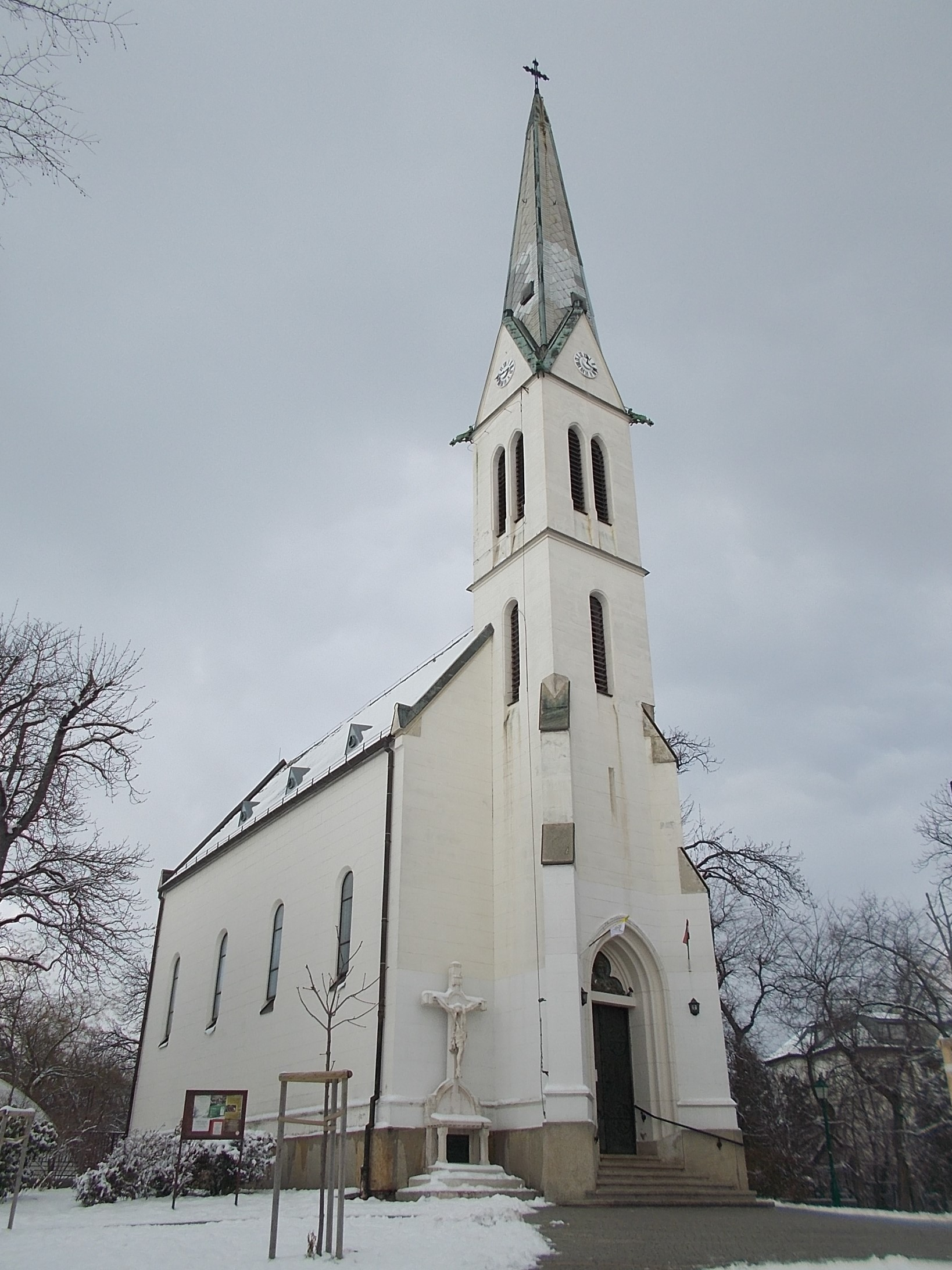
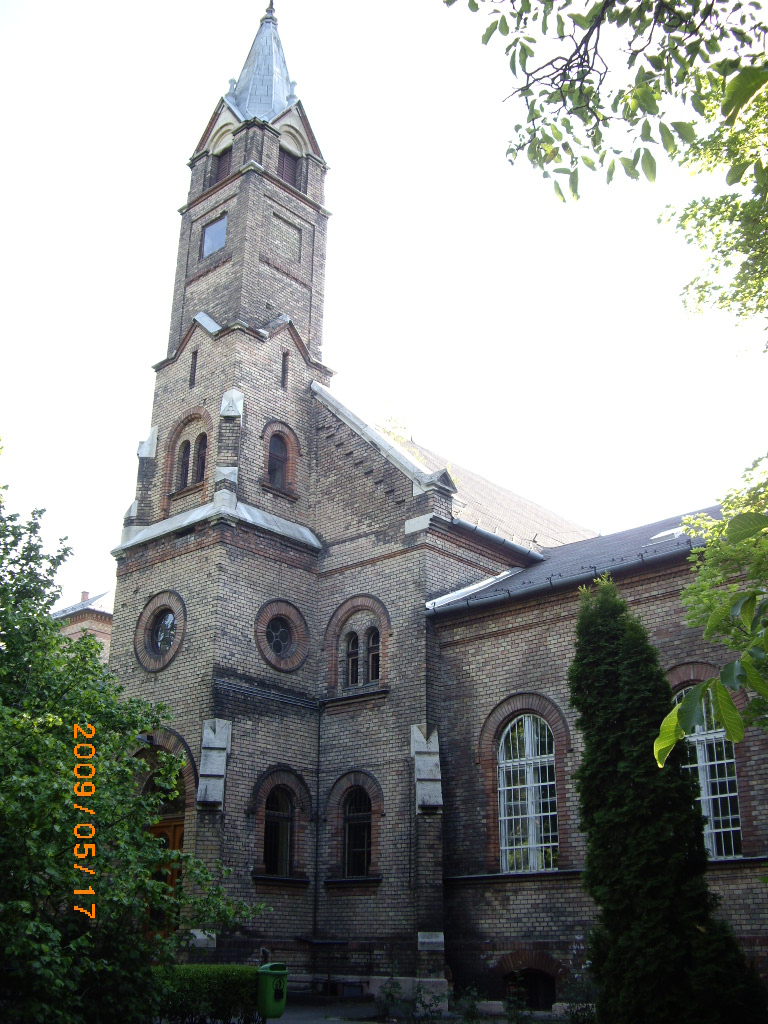
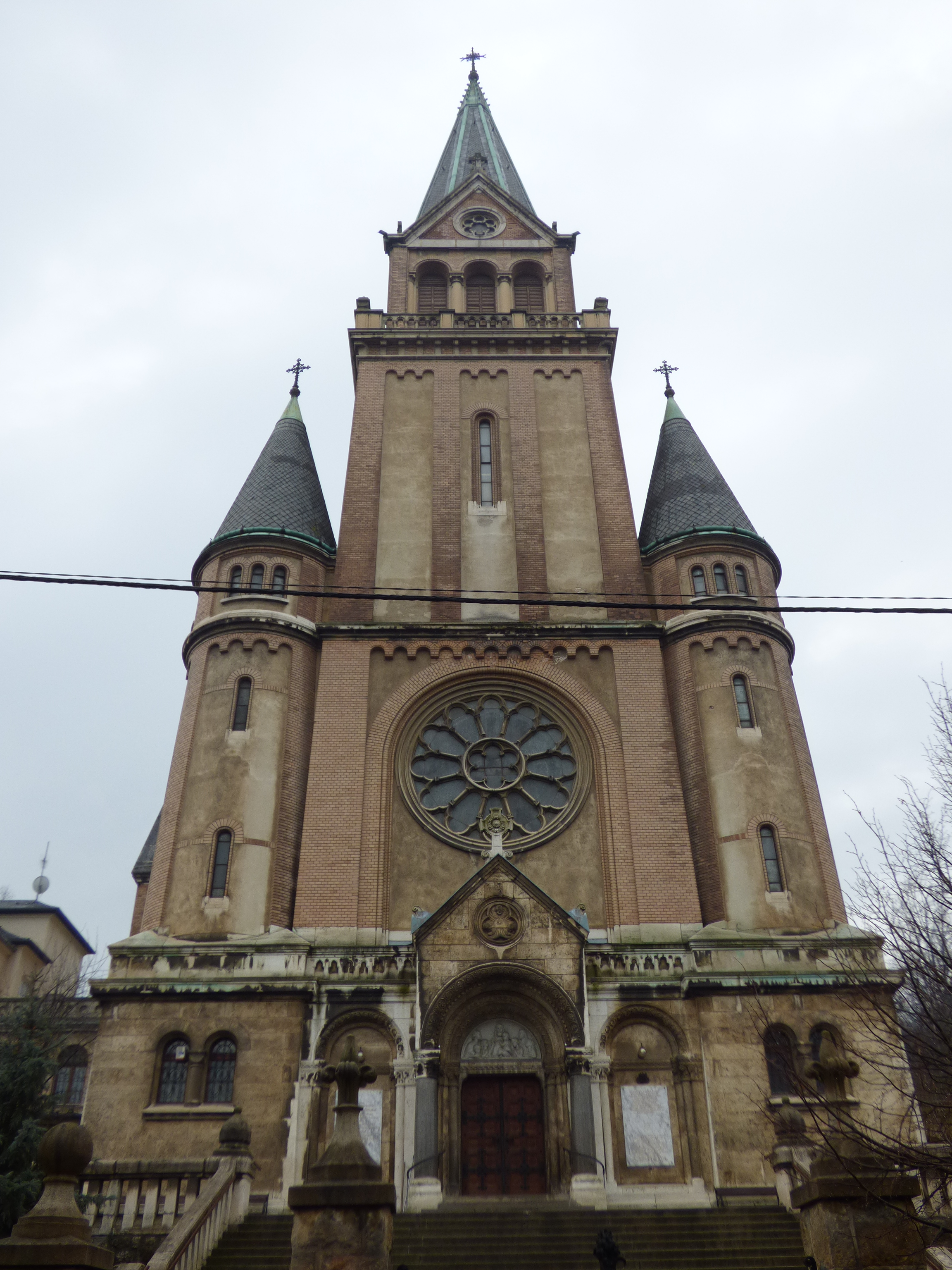
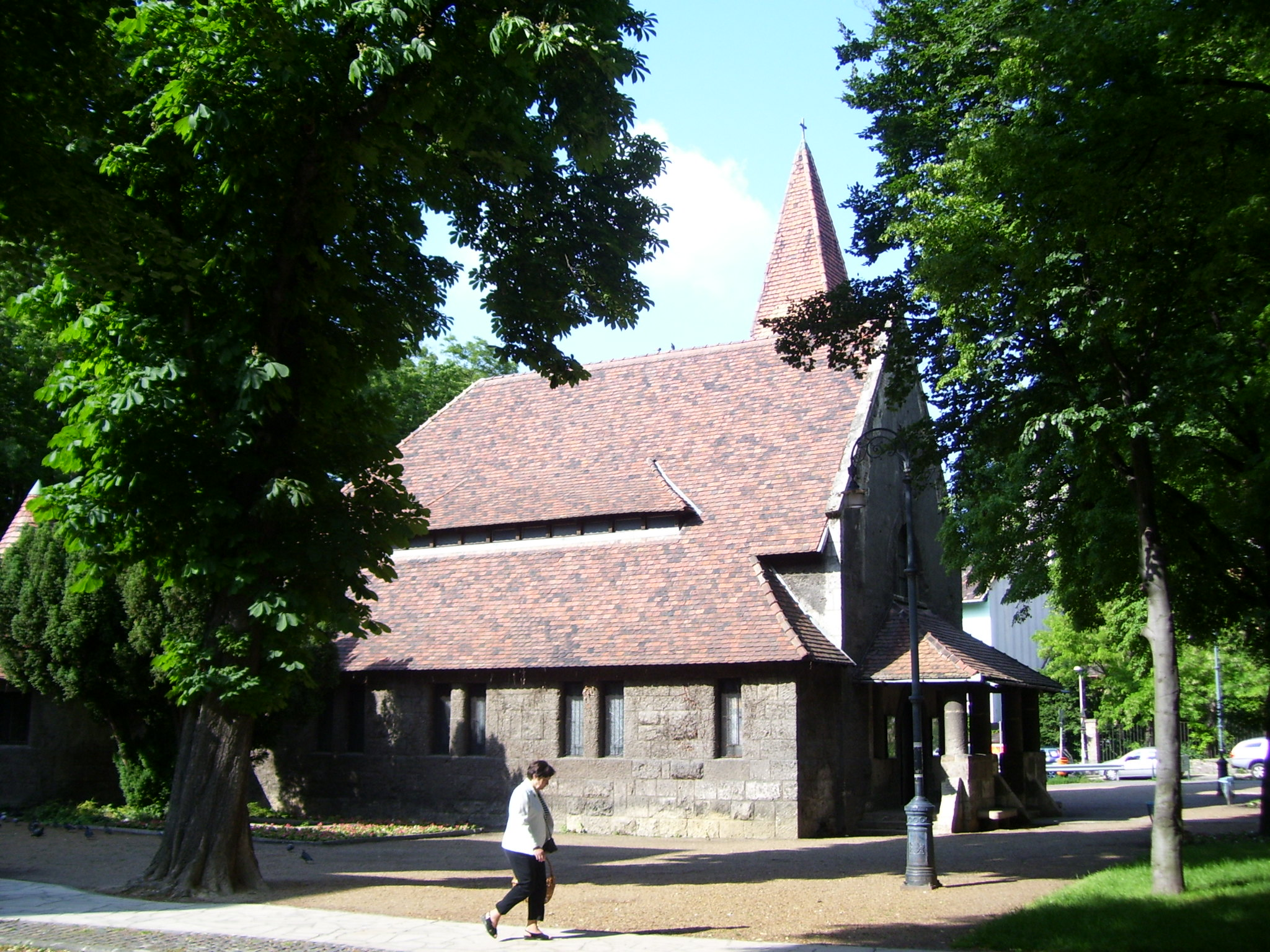
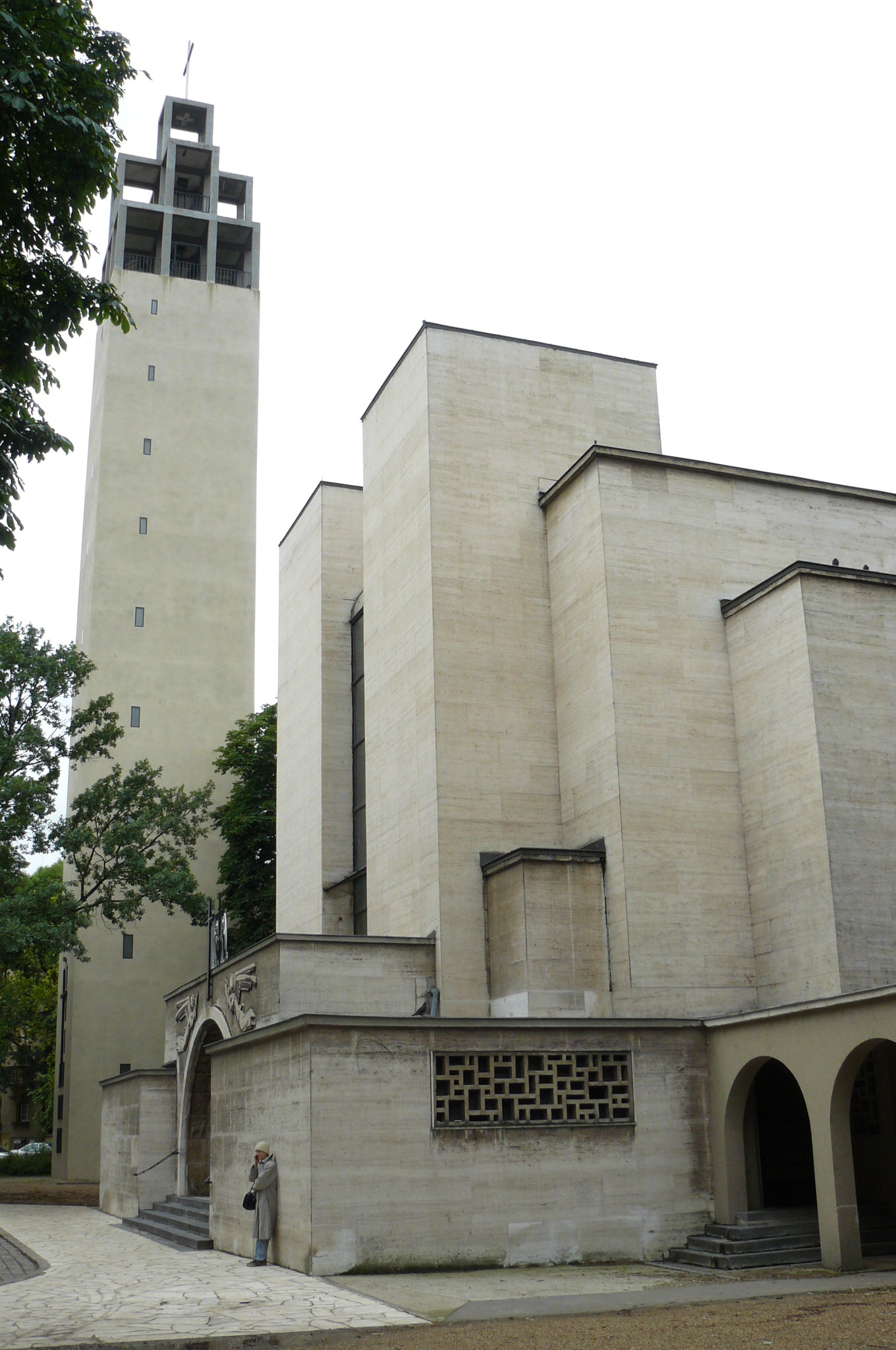
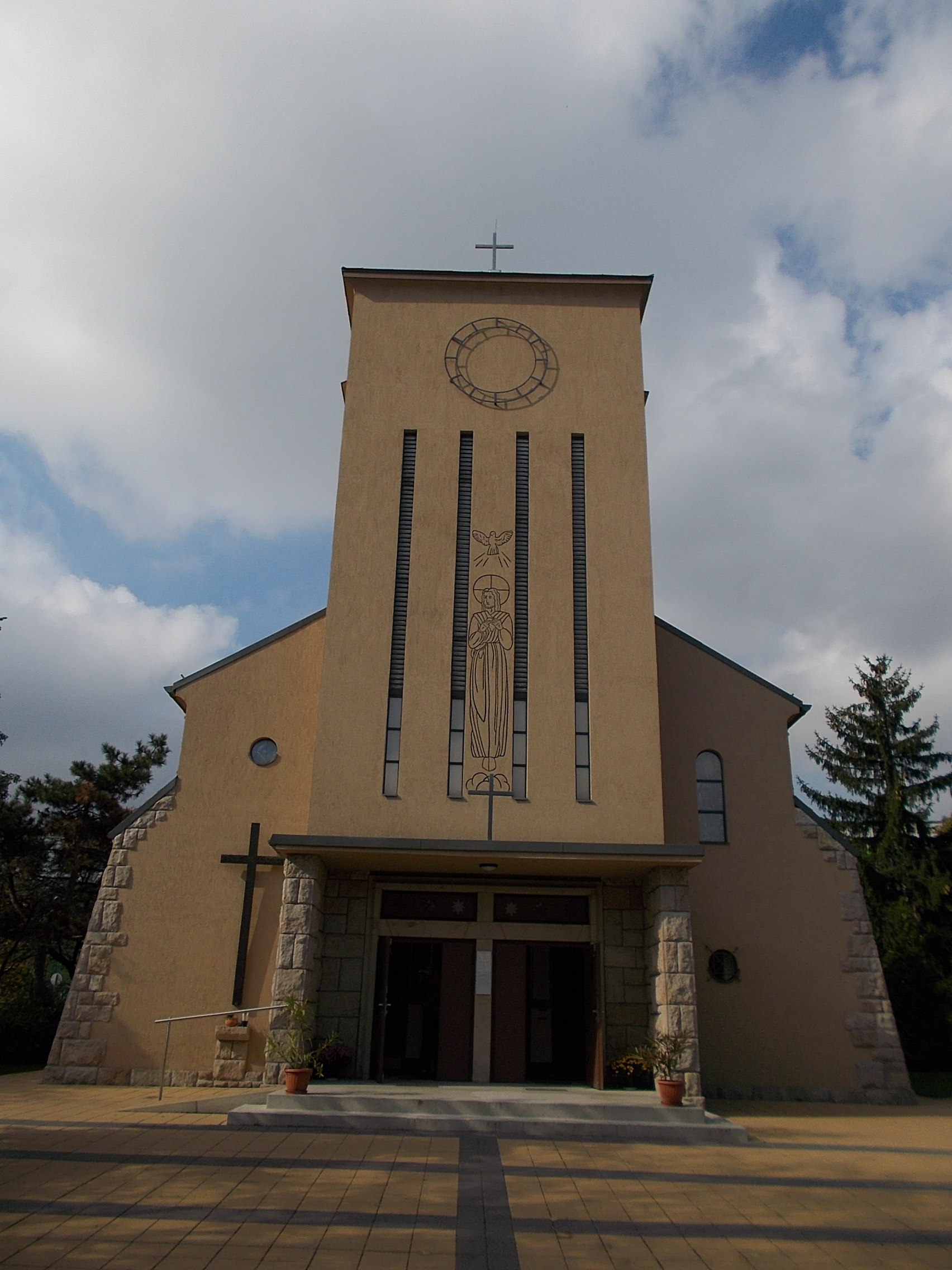
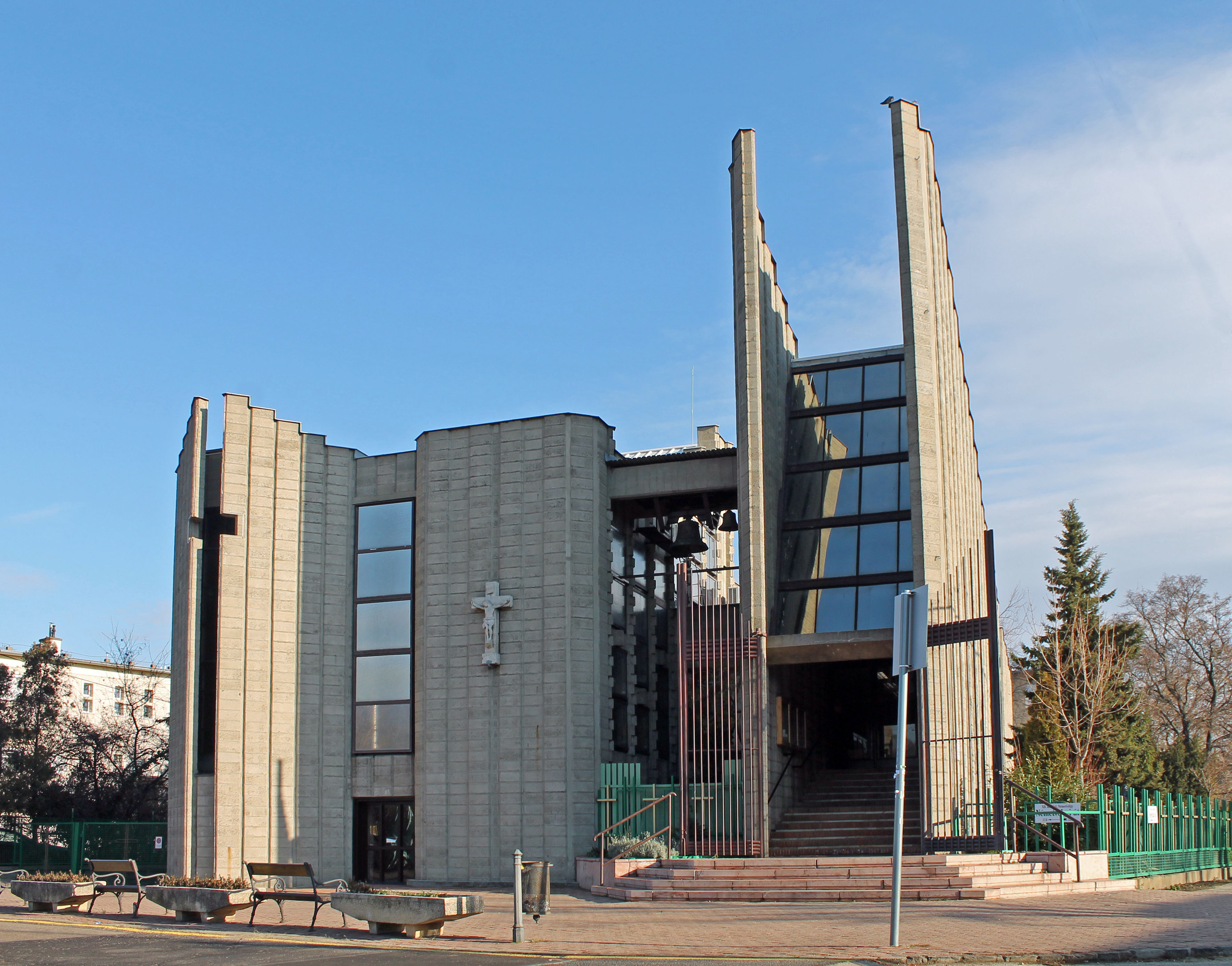
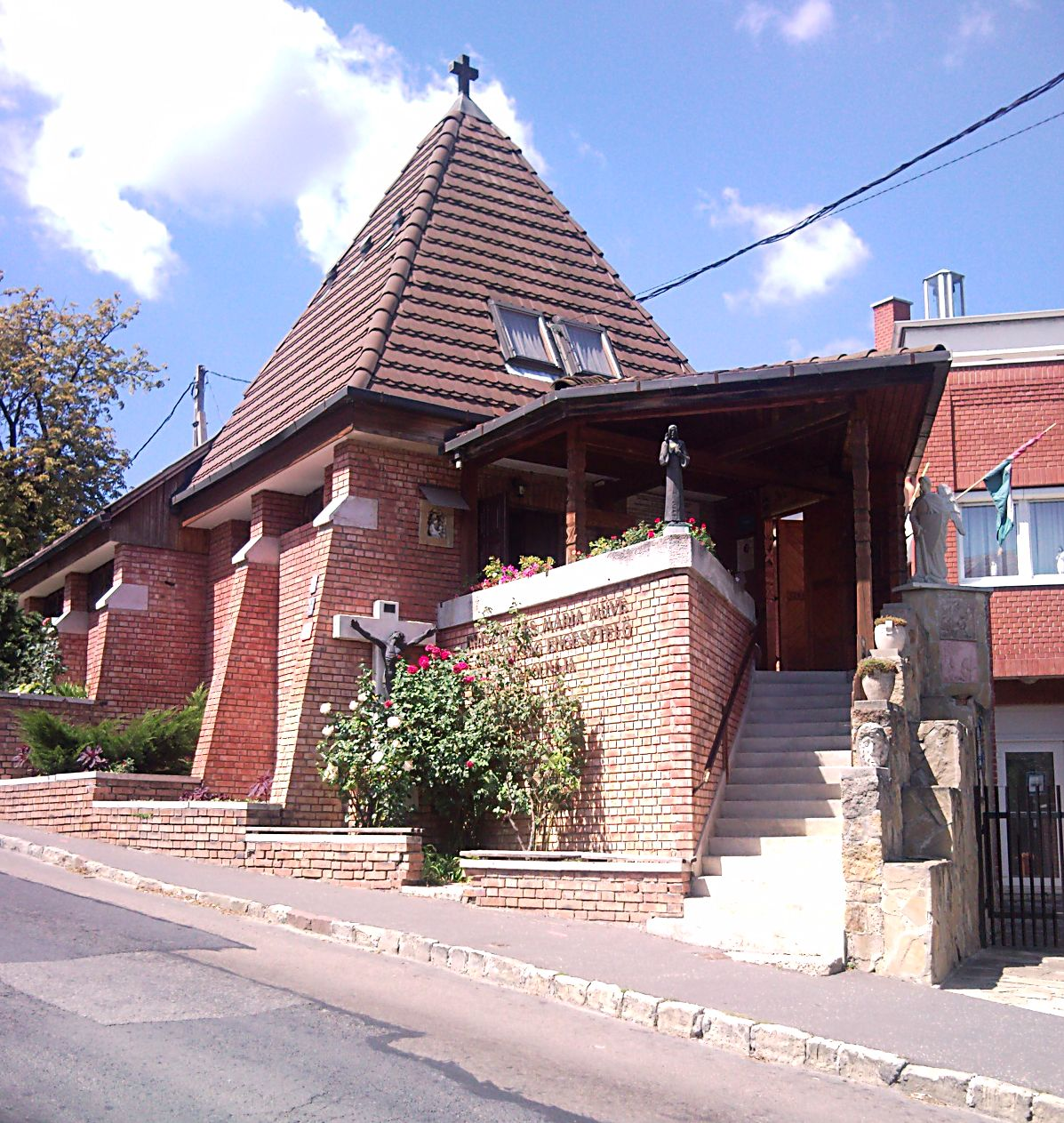
| Picture | Name | Construction time | Architectural style | Designer | Address, comments |
|---|---|---|---|---|---|
| | Istenhegyi Szent László-templom | 1860 | romantic | Ybl Miklós | 1125 Budapest, Diana u. 15a. The tower was built only in 1886 according to the plans of Ferenc Pfaff. |
| | Nepomuki Szent János Kápolna | 1898 (?) | neogothic | Barcza Elek (?) | 1125 Budapest, Diós árok 1–3. It is located in St. John's Hospital. |
| | Szent Család-plébániatemplom | 1913–1917 | neo-romanesque | Hültl Dezső | 1125 Budapest, Szarvas Gábor u. 52. |
| | Városmajori Jézus Szíve-kistemplom (Városmajori kistemplom, Városmajori kápolna) | 1922–1923 | Hungarian folk | Árkay Aladár | 1122 Budapest, Csaba u. 5. |
| | Városmajori Jézus Szíve-plébániatemplom | 1932–1933 | modern | Árkay Aladár, Árkay Bertalan | 1122 Budapest, Csaba u. 5. |
| | Felső-krisztinavárosi Keresztelő Szent János Plébánia templom | 1934 | modern | Fiala Ferenc, Lehoczky György | 1124 Budapest, Apor Vilmos tér 9. |
| | Mindenszentek-plébániatemplom | 1975–1977 | modern | István Szabó | 1124 Budapest, Hegyalja út 139. |
| | Szent Kereszt templom | 1979 | modern | István Szabó | 1123 Budapest, Táltos u. 16. |
| | Kútvölgyi Boldogasszony-kápolna | 1990 | n. a. | n. a. | 1125 Budapest, Galgóczi u. 49–51. It was built on the site of an earlier chapel. |
| | Irgalmas Jézus onkológiai kórházkápolna | 20th century | n. a. | n. a. | 1122 Budapest, Ráth György u. 7–9. |

=== Reformed churches ===
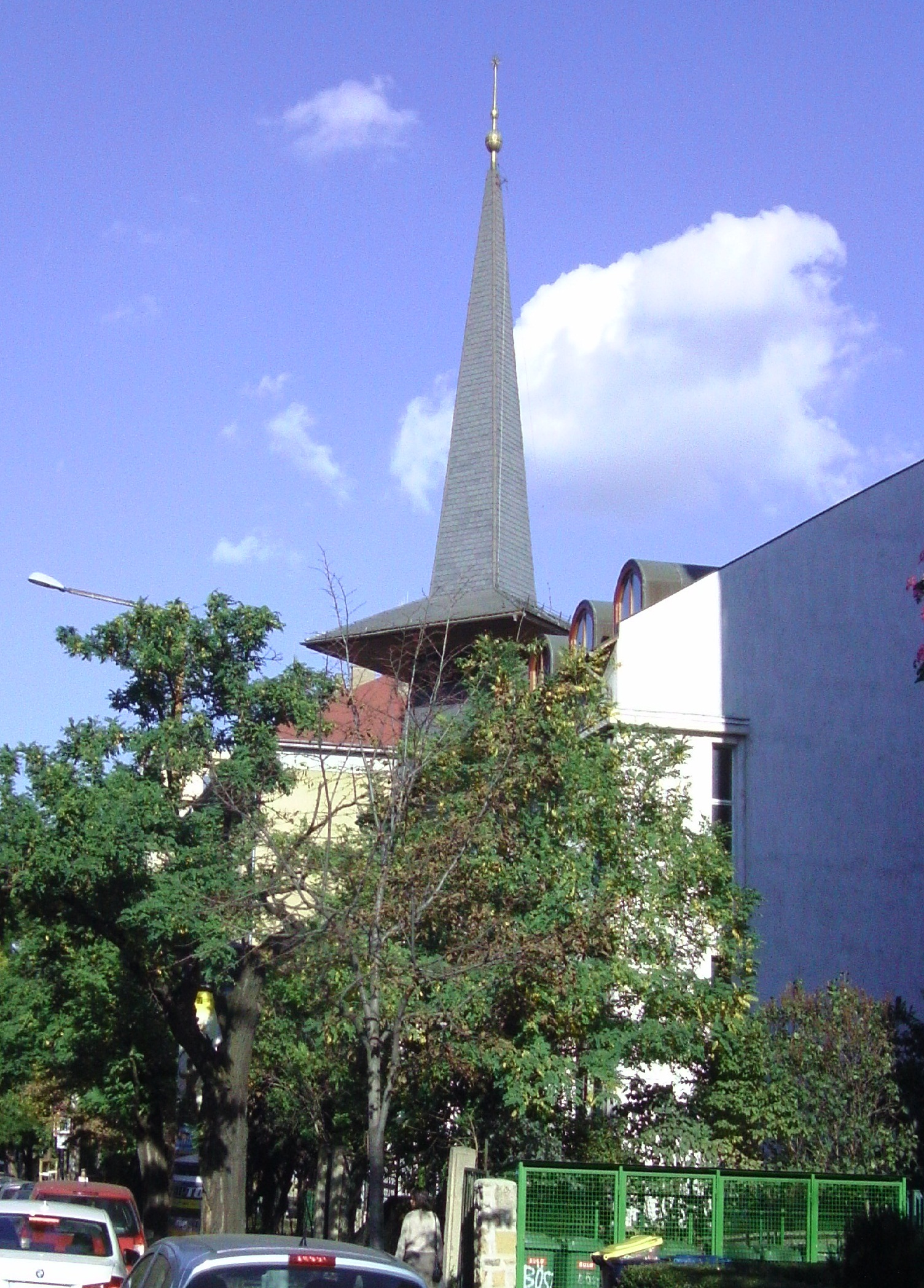
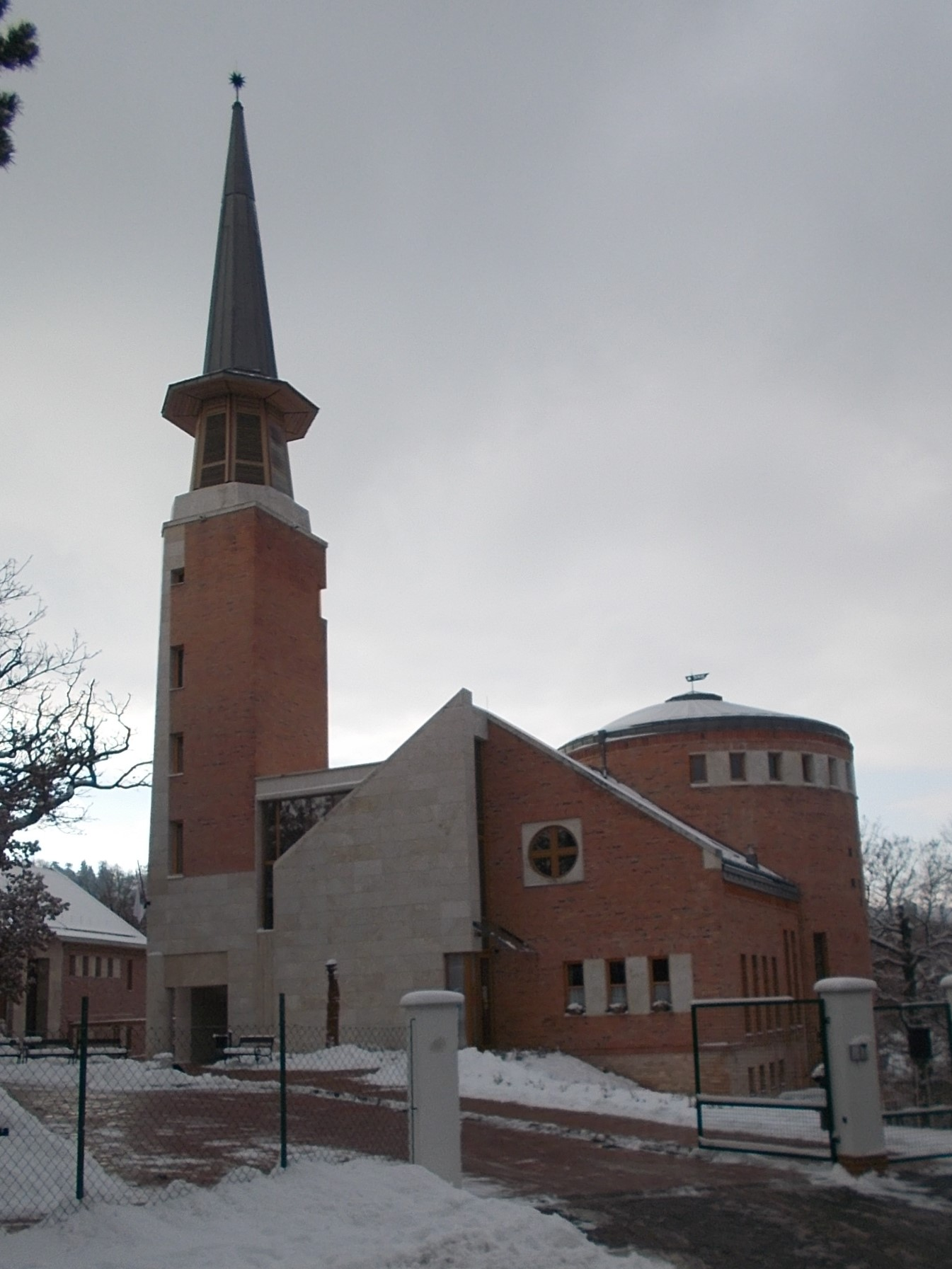
| Picture | Name | Construction time | Architectural style | Designer | Address, comments |
|---|---|---|---|---|---|
| | Budahegyvidéki református templom | before 1935 | n. a. | n. a. | 1126 Budapest, Böszörményi út 28. The building was given a tower only in 1995. |
| | Csaba utcai Prédikátorállomási Egyházközség imaterme | 20th century | n. a. | n. a. | 1122 Budapest, Csaba u. 3. |
| | Svábhegyi református templom | 2003–2007 | n. a. | n. a. | 1125 Budapest, Felhő u. 10. |

=== Evangelical churches ===
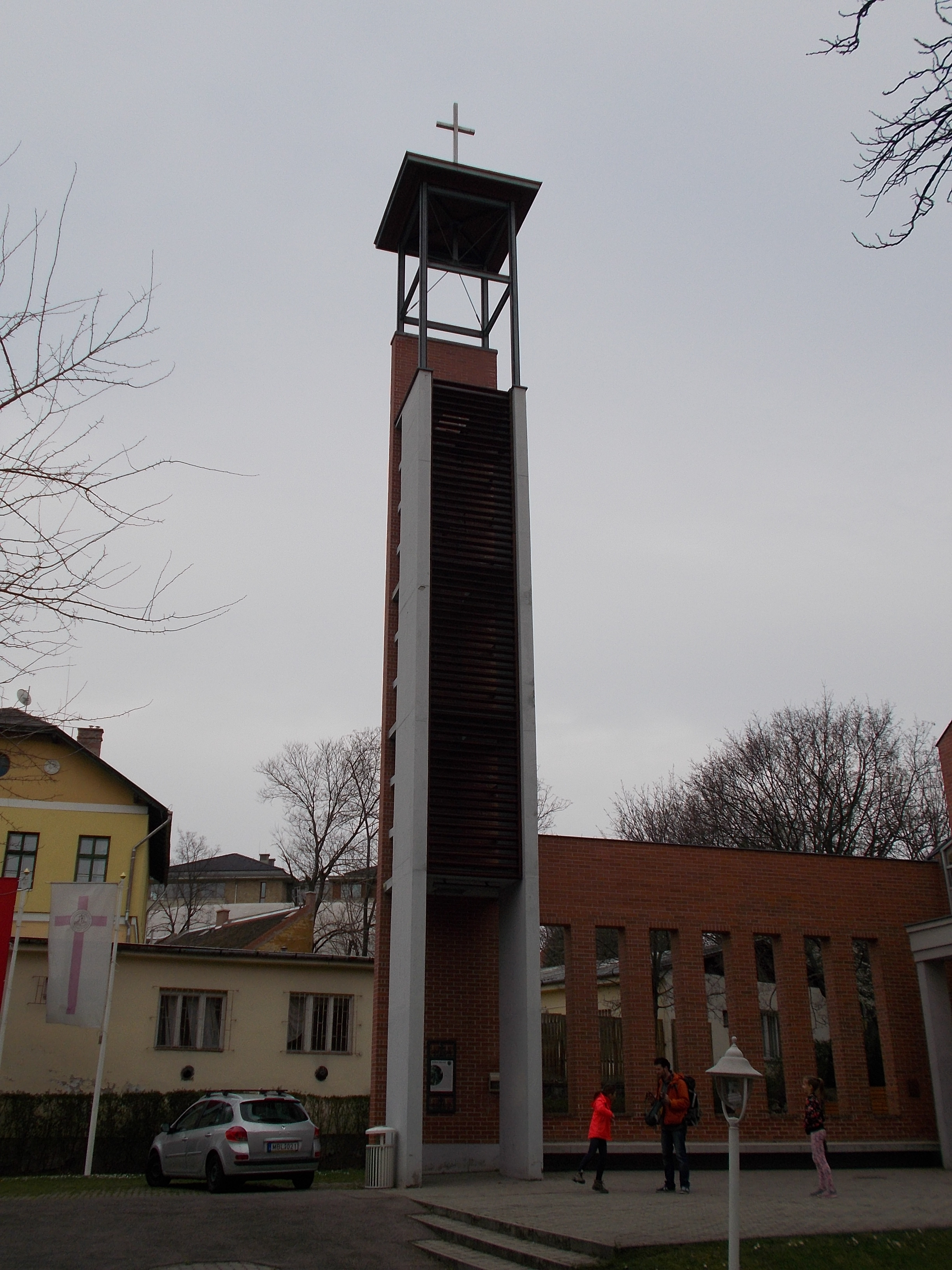
| Picture | Name | Construction time | Architectural style | Designer | Address, comments |
|---|---|---|---|---|---|
| | Budahegyvidéki evangélikus templom | 2001 | n. a. | n. a. | 1123 Budapest, Kék Golyó u. 17. |

== District XIII ==
=== Roman Catholic churches ===
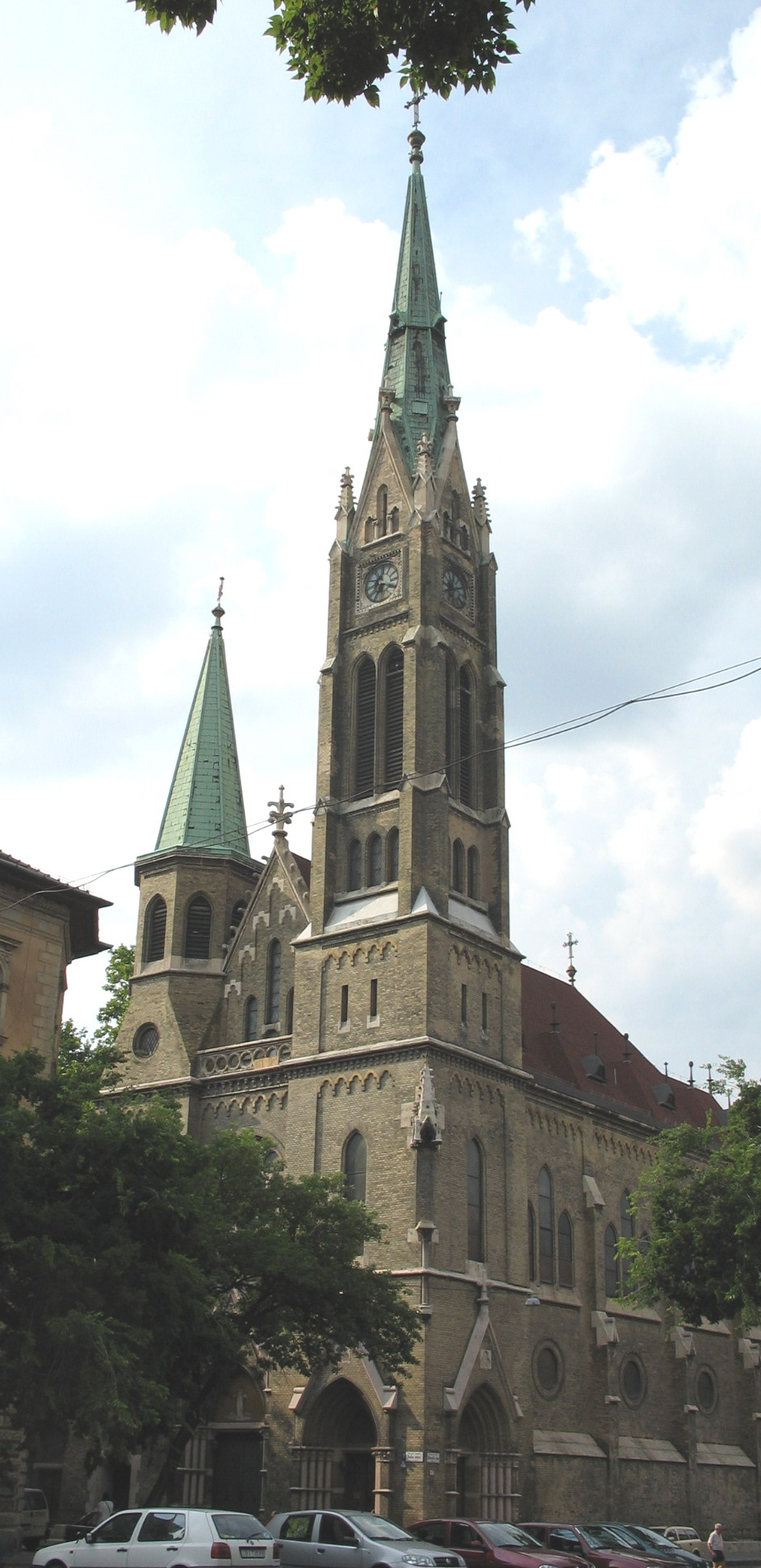
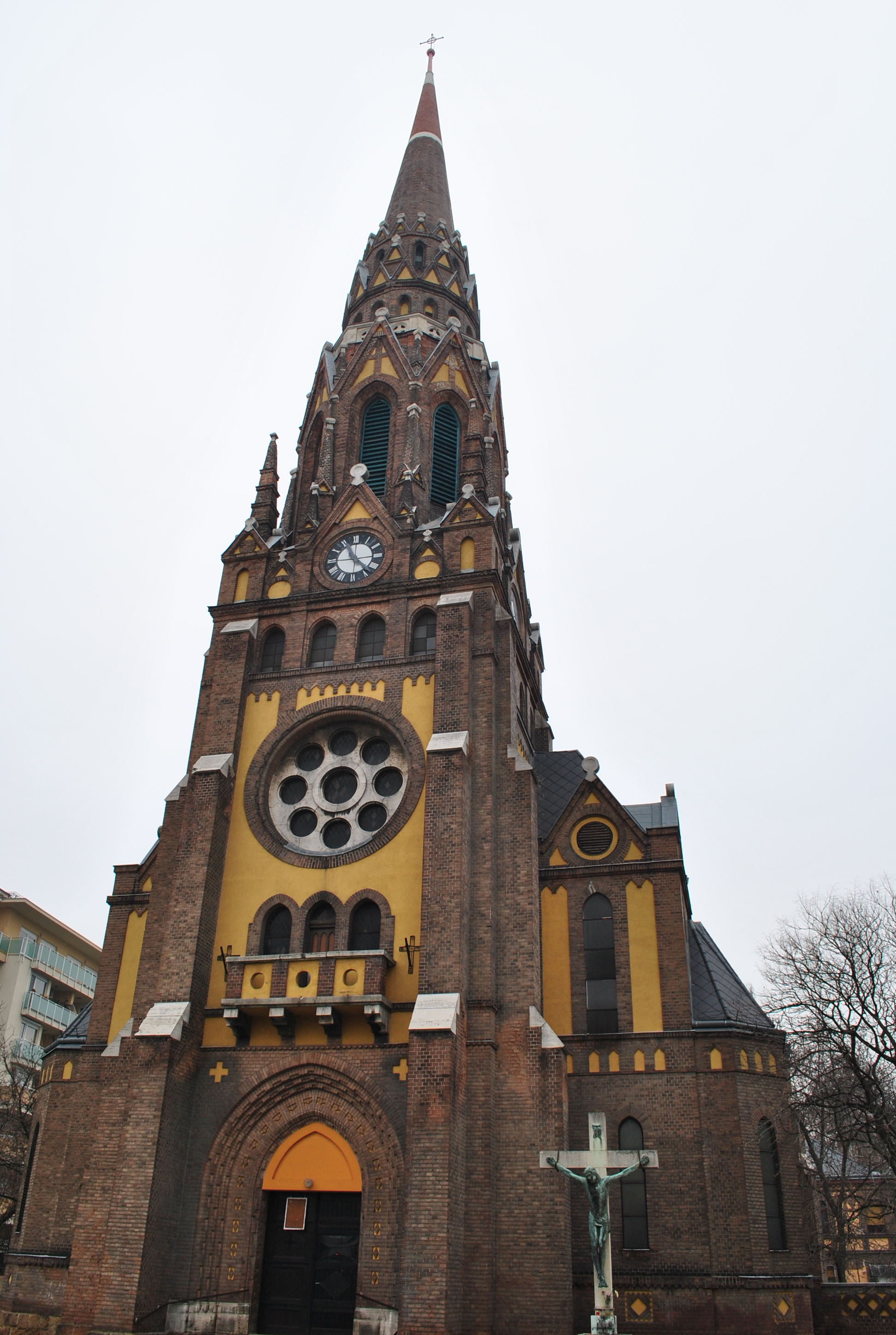
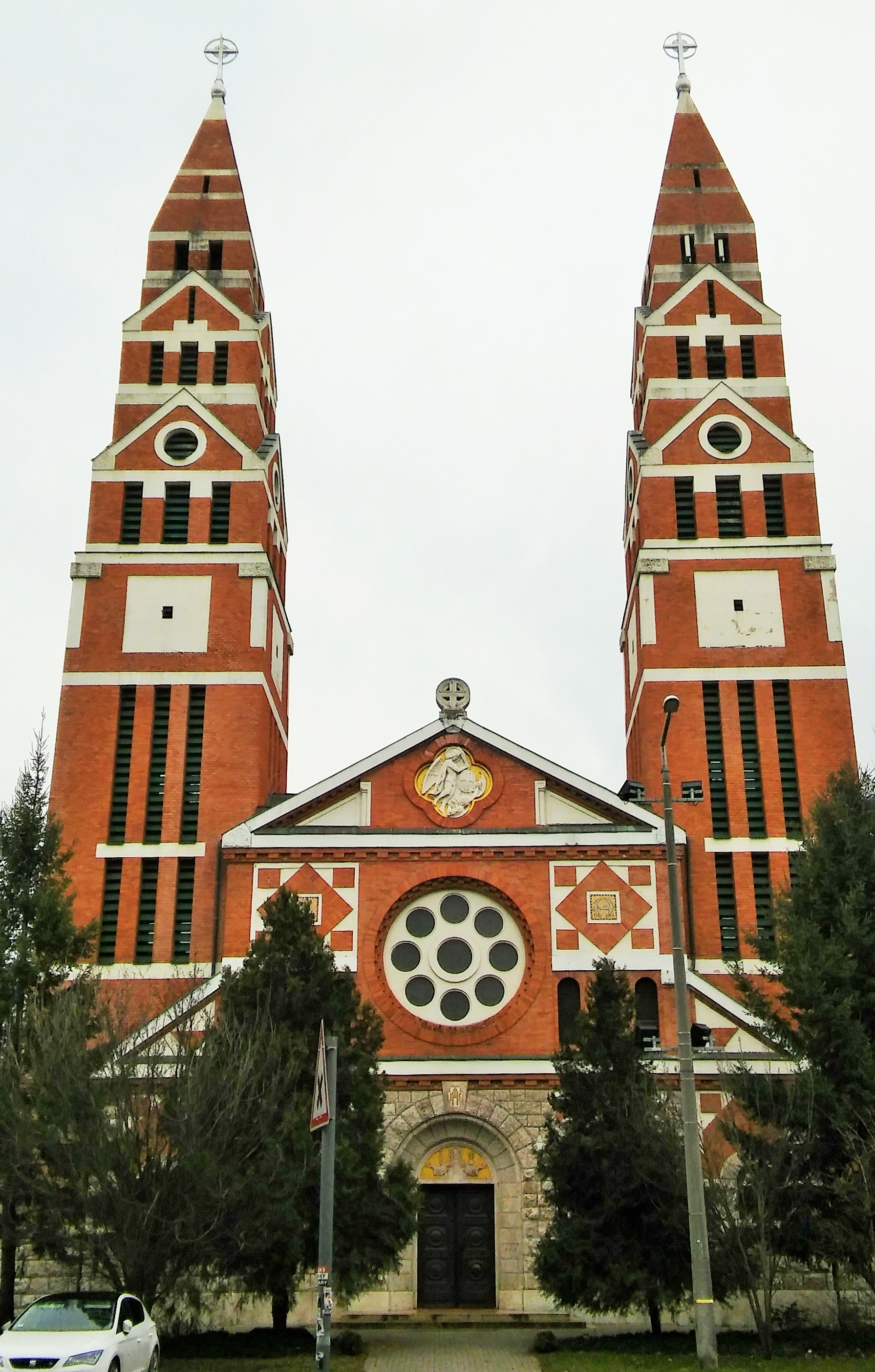
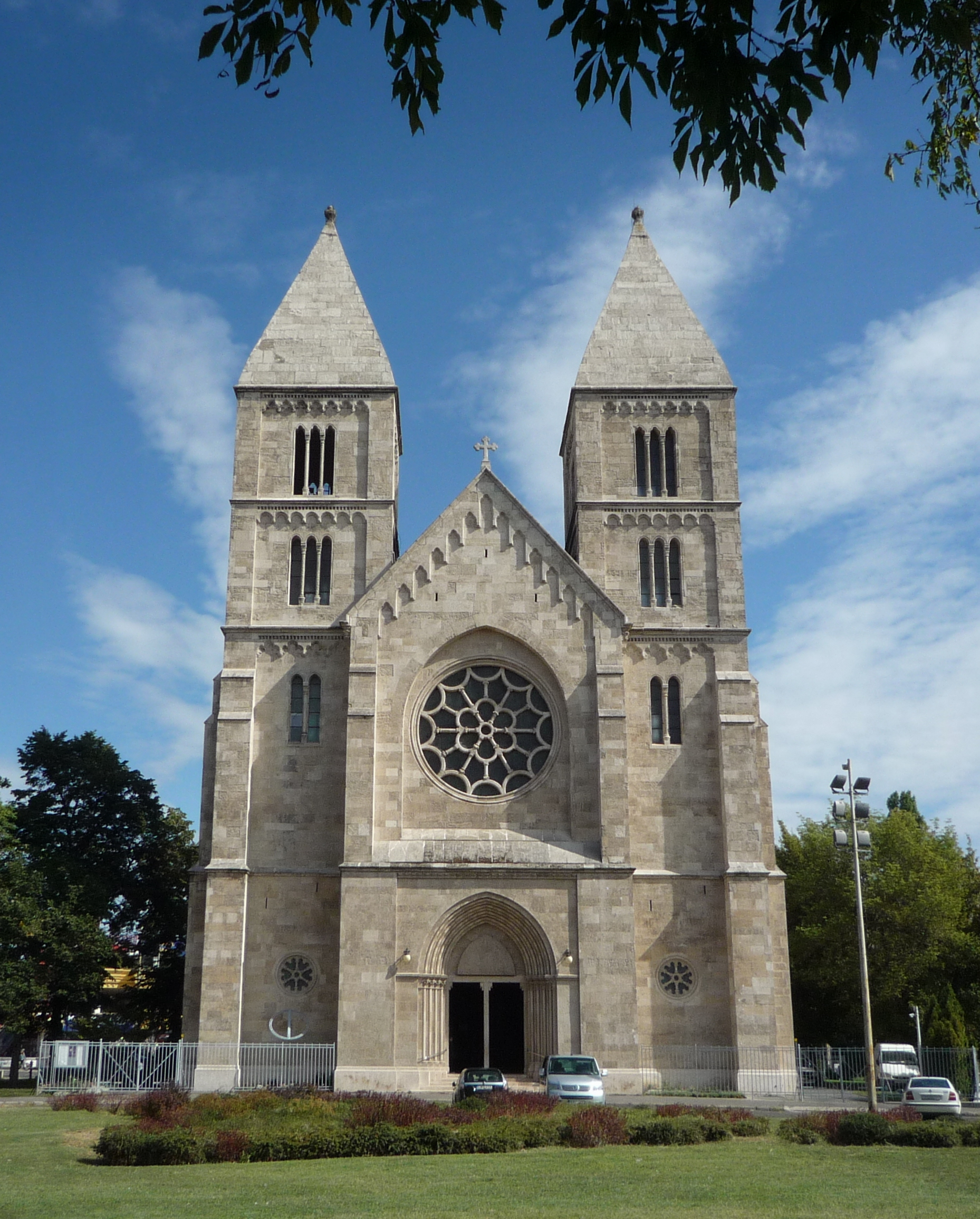
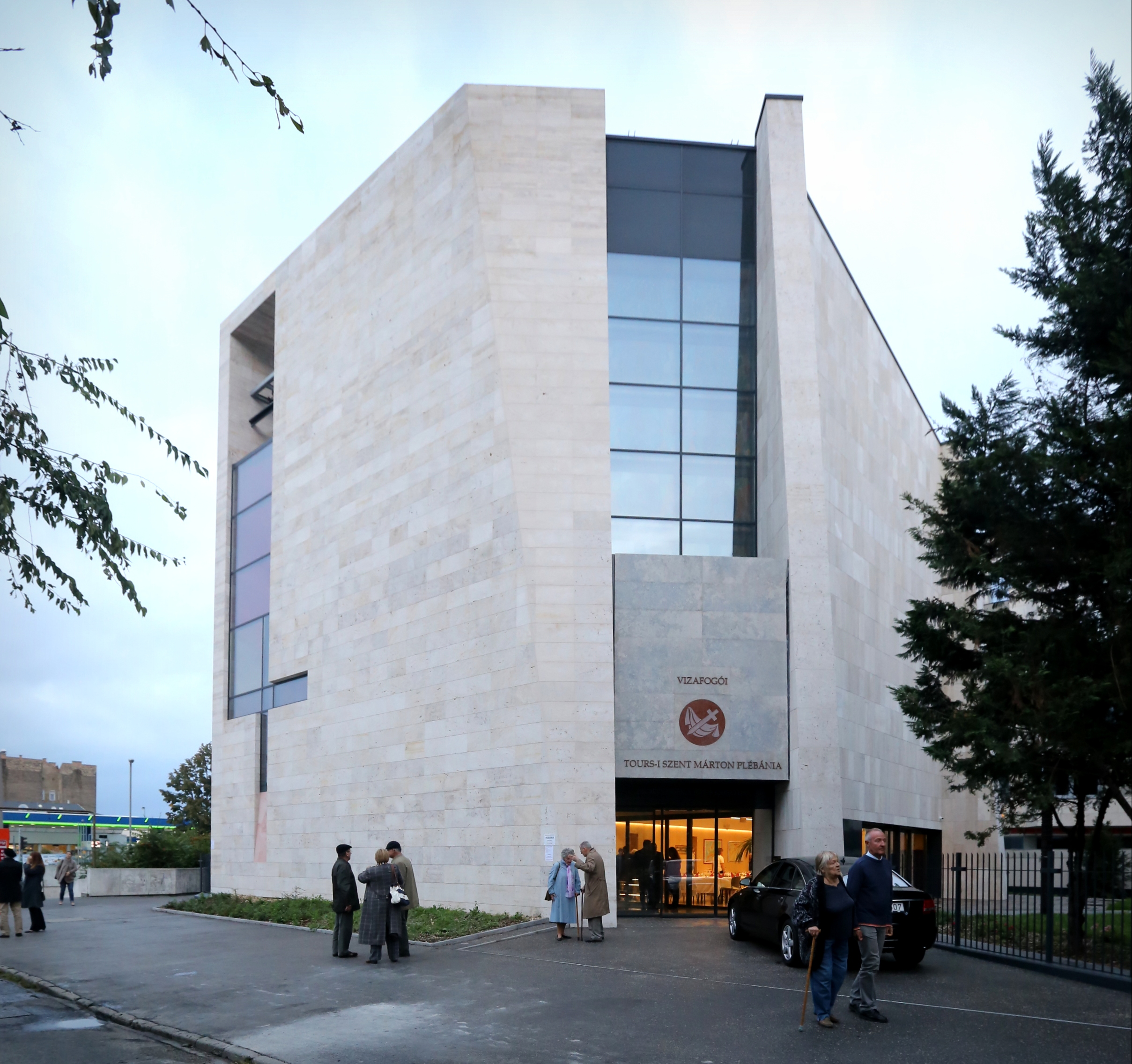
| Picture | Name | Construction time | Architectural style | Designer | Address, comments |
|---|---|---|---|---|---|
| | Kármelhegyi Boldogasszony kármelita templom és rendház | 1895–1899 | neogothic | Hofhauser Antal | 1134 Budapest, Huba u. 12. |
| | Angyalföldi Szent László-plébániatemplom | 1928–1929 | neogothic | Petrovácz Gyula | 1139 Budapest, Béke tér 1/A. |
| | Külső Váci úti Szent Mihály-plébániatemplom | 1929–1930 | neo-romanesque | Ernő Foerk | 1131 Budapest, Babér utca 17/b |
| | Árpád-házi Szent Margit-templom (Lehel téri templom) | 1931–1933 | neo-romanesque | Möller István | 1132 Budapest, Váci út 34. |
| | Külsőangyalföldi Mária Keresztények Segítsége plébániatemplom | 1941–1943 | n. a. | n. a. | 1131 Budapest, Rokolya u. 28. |
| | Szent Ágoston-kápolna | 1950 | n. a. | n. a. | 1137 Budapest, Pozsonyi út 14. Located at the bottom of an apartment building. |
| | Tours-i Szent Márton és Flüei Szent Miklós-plébániatemplom | 1985 | modern | István Szabó, Borsányi László | 1139 Budapest, Váci út 91/b. |

=== Reformed churches ===
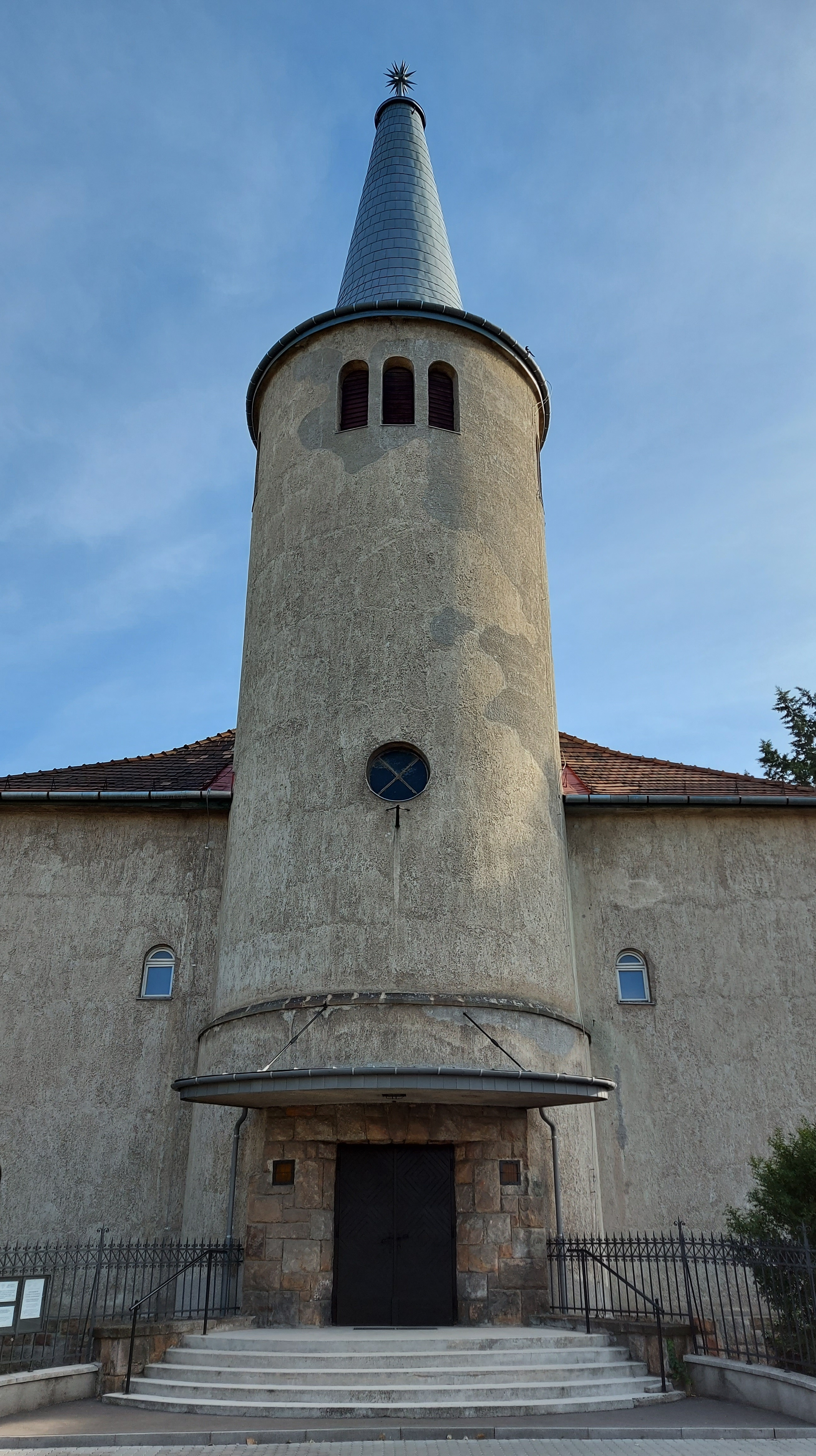
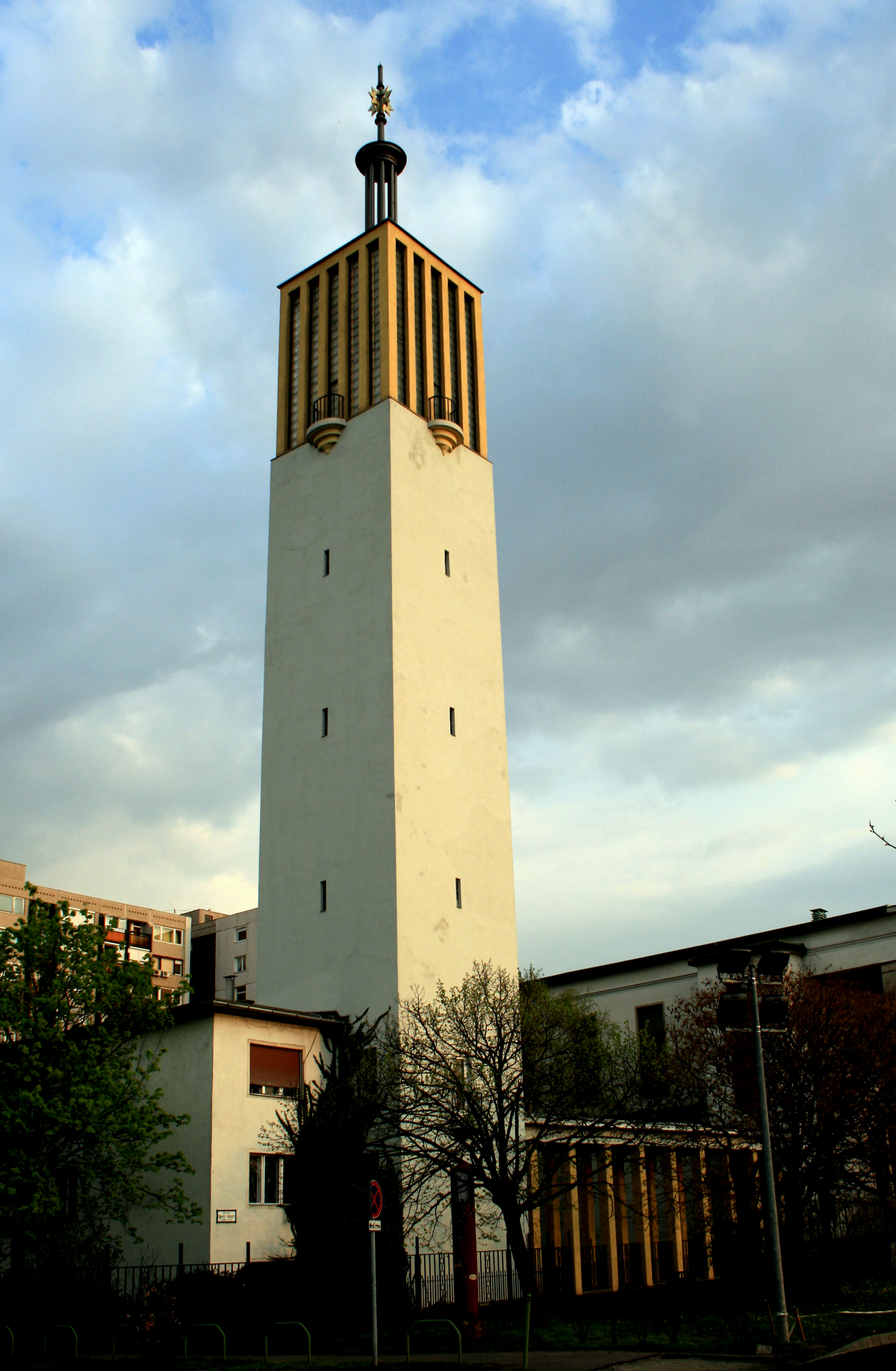
| Picture | Name | Construction time | Architectural style | Designer | Address, comments |
|---|---|---|---|---|---|
| | Angyalföldi református templom | 1927–1933 | Hungarian folk (?) | Padányi-Gulyás Jenő és Gothard Zsigmond | 1139 Budapest, Frangepán u. 43. |
| | Pozsonyi úti református templom | 1936–1940 | modern / neo-classicist | Imre Tóth, Halászy Jenő | 1133 Budapest, Pozsonyi út 58. |

=== Evangelical churches ===
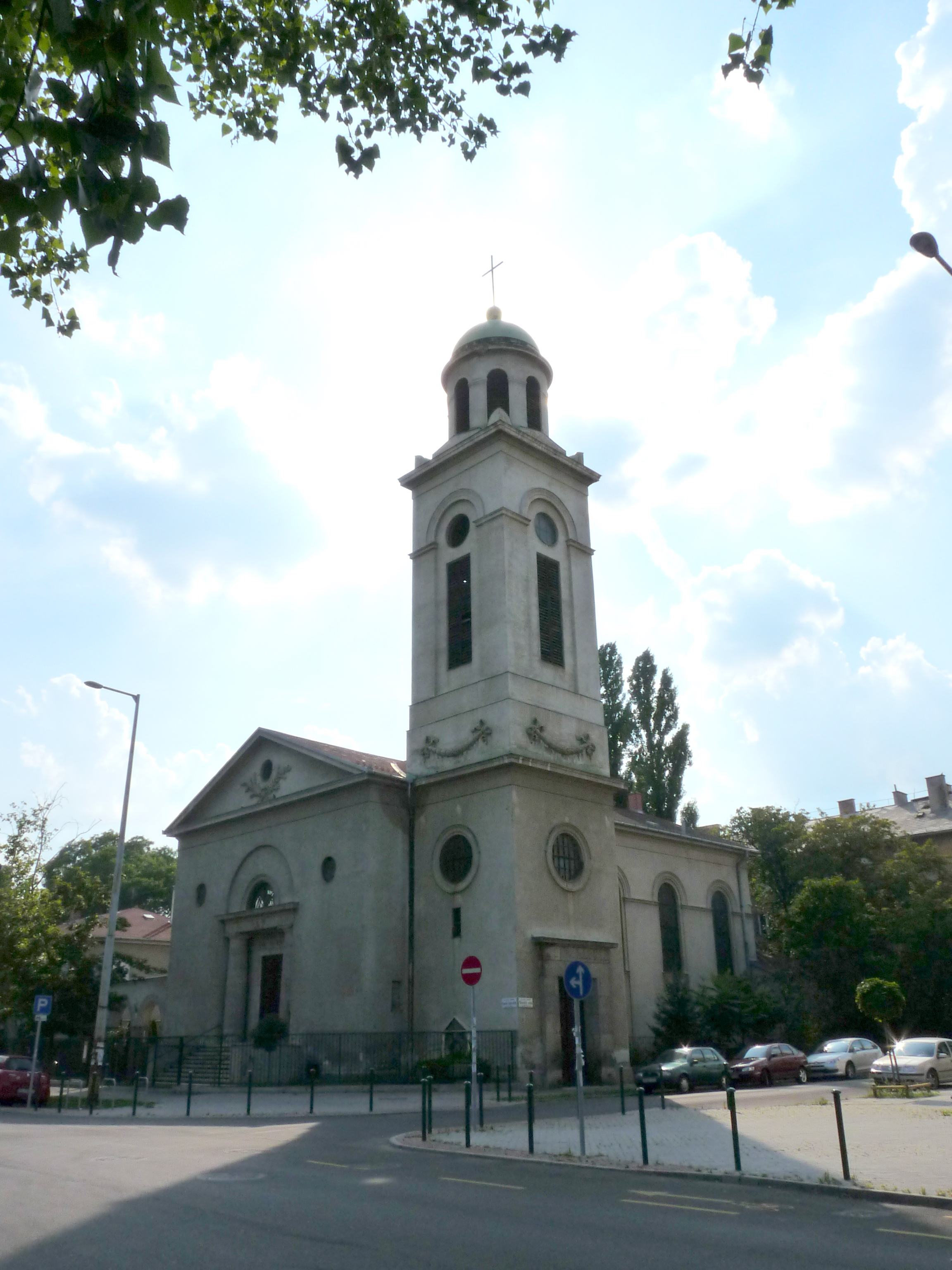
| Picture | Name | Construction time | Architectural style | Designer | Address, comments |
|---|---|---|---|---|---|
| | Angyalföldi evangélikus templom | 1937–1938 | neo-classicist | Gyula Sándy | 1134 Budapest, Kassák Lajos utca 22. |

=== Other churches ===
| Picture | Name | Construction time | Architectural style | Designer | Address, comments |
|---|---|---|---|---|---|
| | Angyalföldi baptista templom | 1938 | n. a. | n. a. | 1134 Budapest, Váci út 51/a. |

== District XIV ==
=== Roman Catholic churches ===
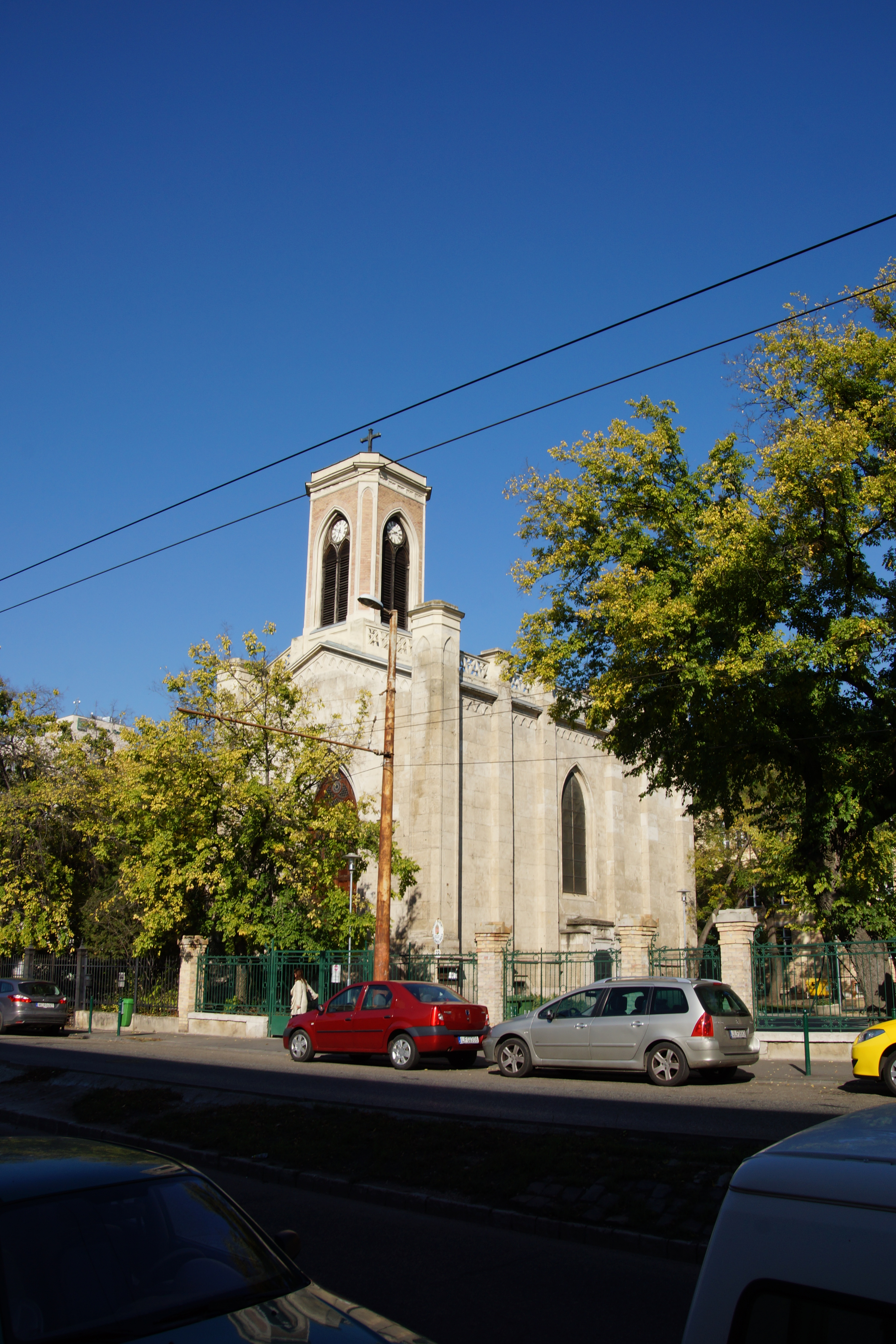
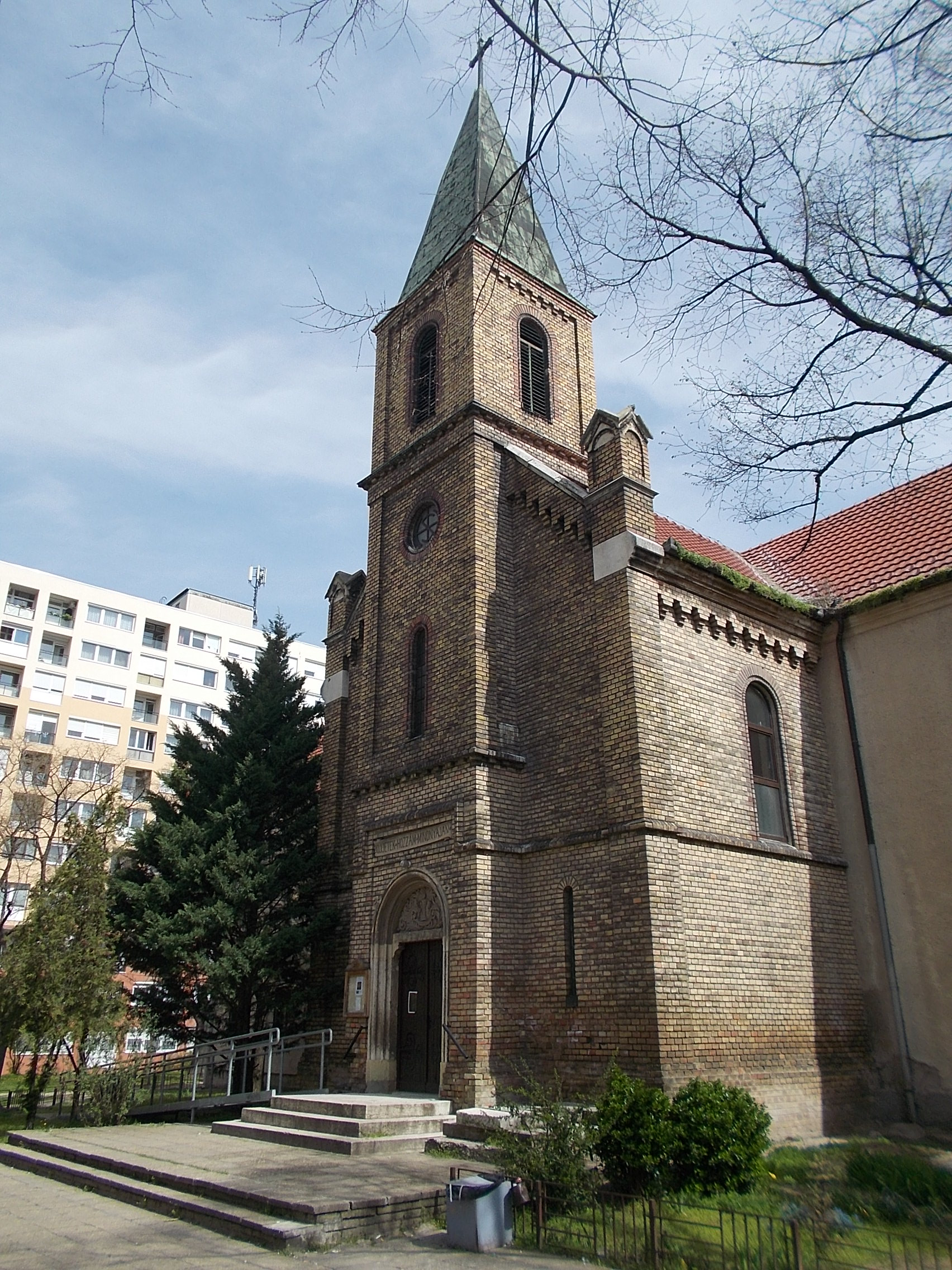
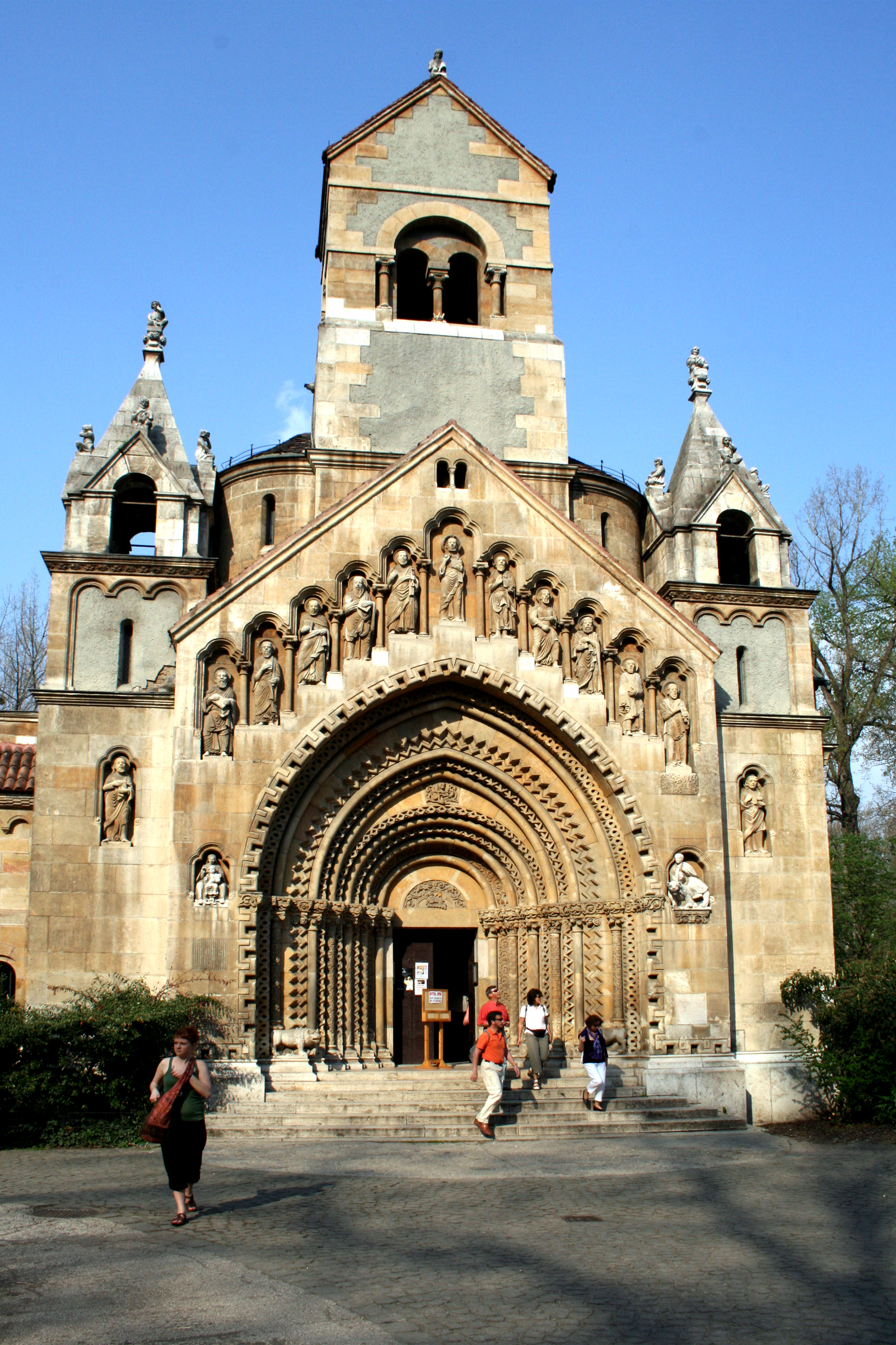
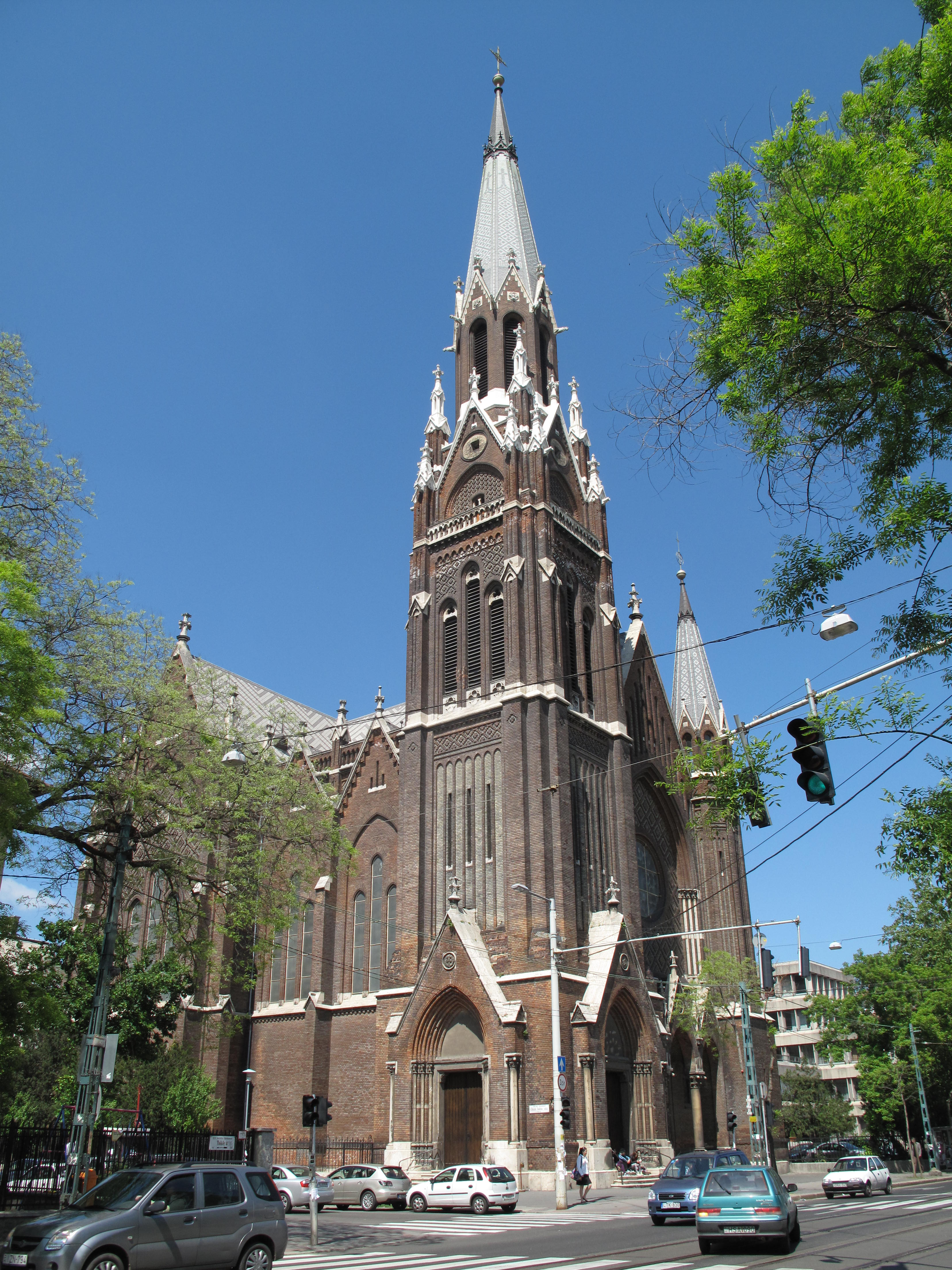
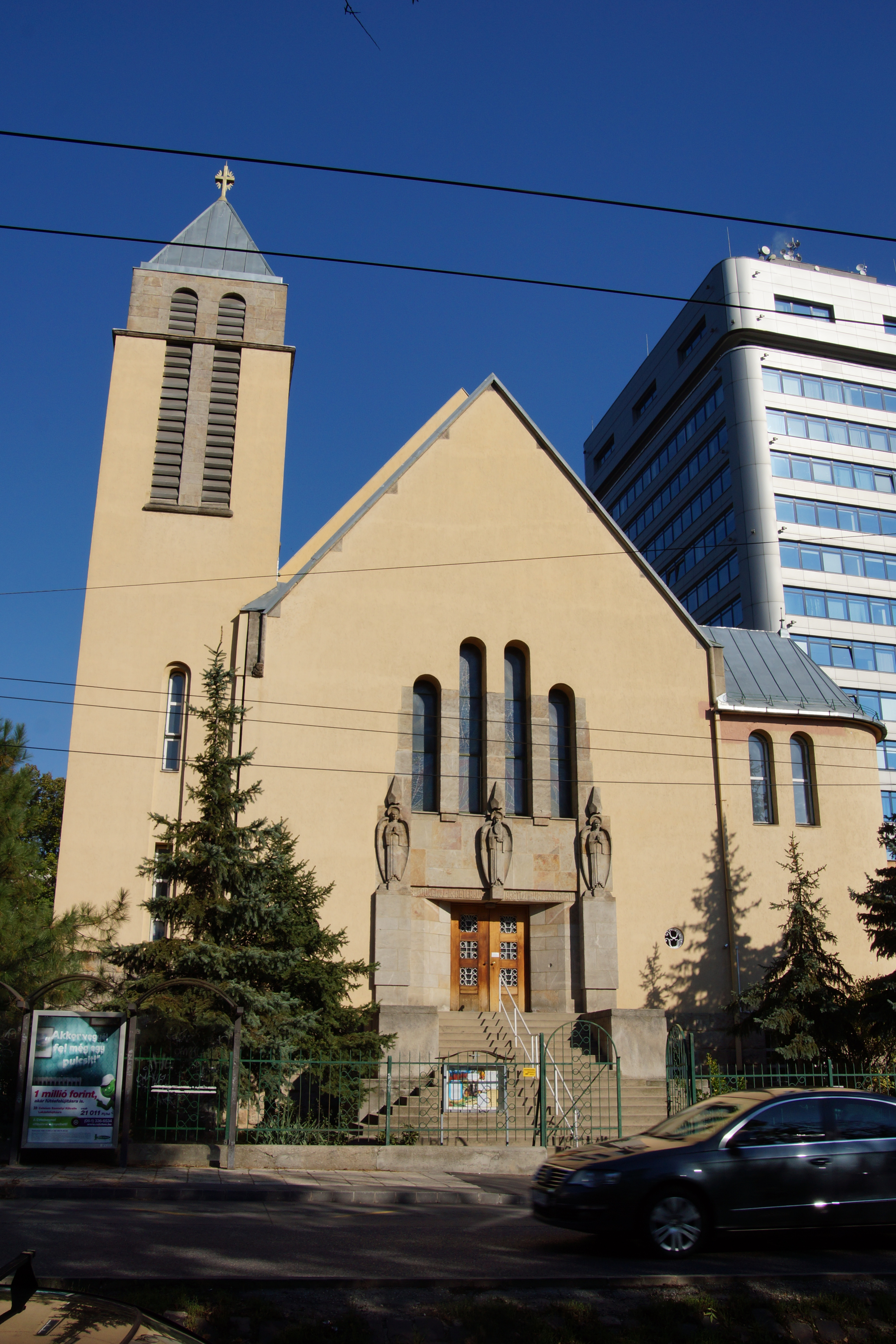
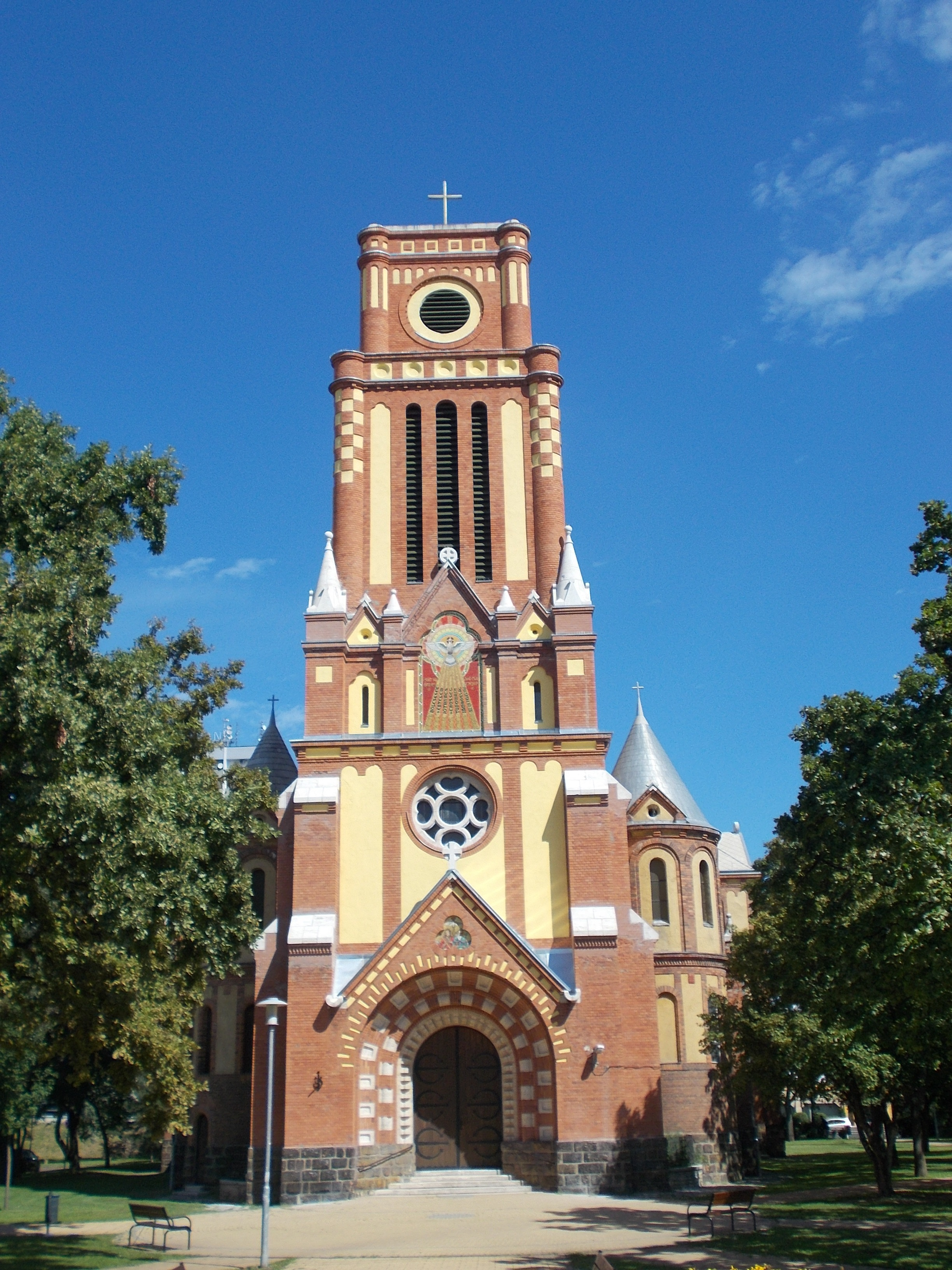
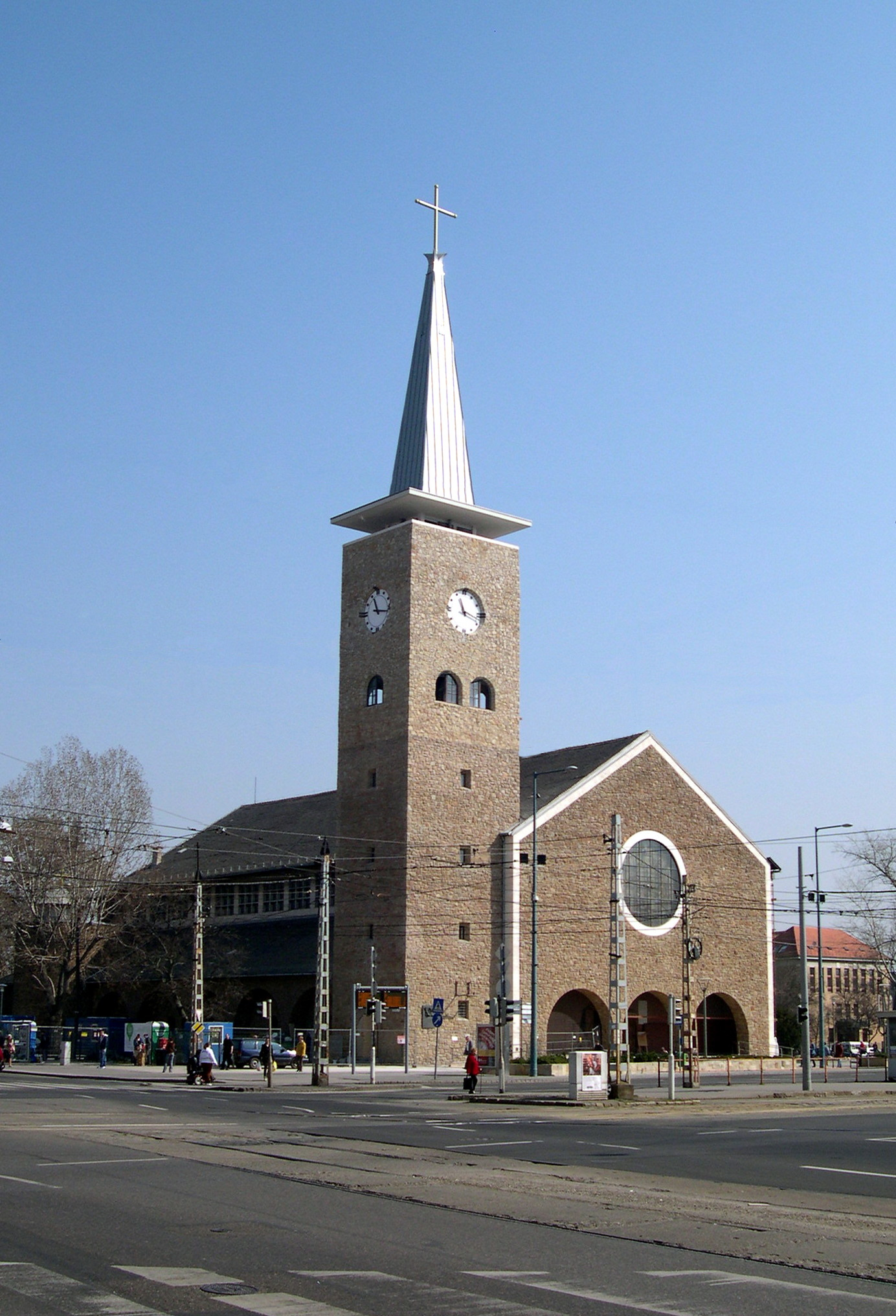
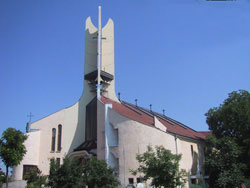
| Picture | Name | Construction time | Architectural style | Designer | Address, comments |
|---|---|---|---|---|---|
| | Hermina-kápolna | 1842–1856 | romantic | Hild József | 1146 Budapest, Hermina út 23. |
| | Rákosfalvai Szent István Király templom | 1874 | romantic (?) | Král István | 1144 Budapest, Álmos vezér tere 1. |
| | Jáki kápolna | 1908 | neo-romanesque | Alpár Ignác | 1146 Budapest, Vajdahunyad sétány. Located in the castle of Vajdahunyad, it was originally built as a library. |
| | Rózsafüzér Királynéja-templom | 1912–1915 | neogothic | Hofhauser Antal | 1146 Budapest, Thököly út 56. |
| | Budapesti Ferences Mária Missziós nővérek temploma | 1935–1936 | modern | Kismarty-Lechner Jenő | 1146 Budapest, Hermina út 19. |
| | Herminamezői Szentlélek-templom | 1936–1937 | neo-romanesque | Petrovácz Gyula | 1142 Budapest, Kassai tér 2. During World War II, its peaked turret was destroyed and was not later restored. |
| | Páduai Szent Antal-plébániatemplom | 1941–1946 | n. a. | Gyula Rimanóczy | 1145 Budapest, Bosnyák u. 26. |
| | Zoborhegy téri Regnum Marianum templom és közösségi ház | 1995 | n. a. | n. a. | 1141 Budapest, Zoborhegy tér 18. |

=== Reformed churches ===
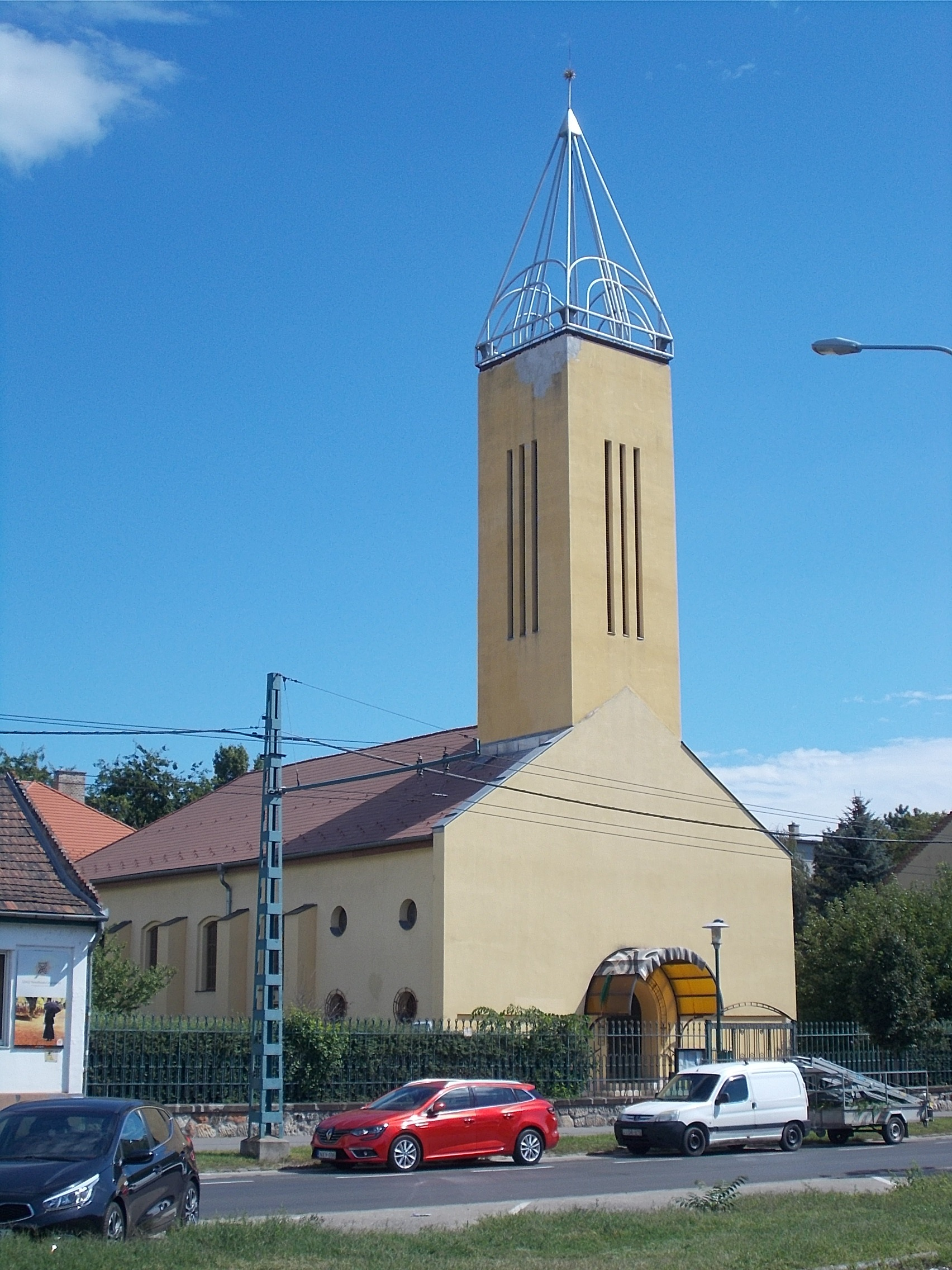
| Picture | Name | Construction time | Architectural style | Designer | Address, comments |
|---|---|---|---|---|---|
| | Zuglói református templom | 1893 | n. a. | n. a. | 1145 Budapest, Róna u. 197–199. Rebuilt several times. |
| | Baross téri református templom | n. a. | n. a. | n. a. | 1146 Budapest, Szabó József u. 16. It is located in the building of the Hungarian Reformed Church Synod. Its name refers to the time before the congregation moved here. |

=== Evangelical churches ===
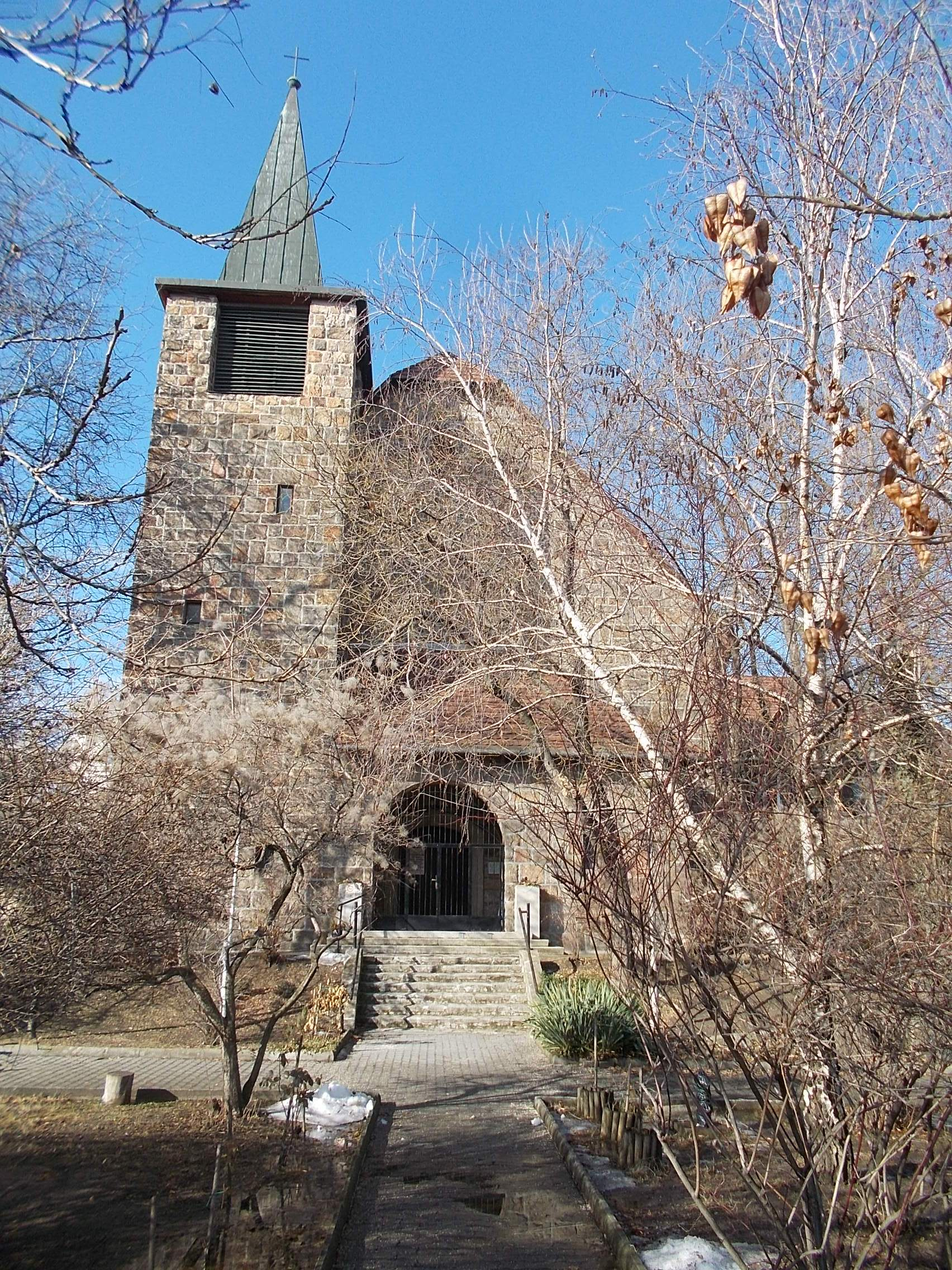
| Picture | Name | Construction time | Architectural style | Designer | Address, comments |
|---|---|---|---|---|---|
| | Zuglói evangélikus templom | 1942 körül | n. a. | Münnich Aladár | 1147 Budapest, Lőcsei út 32. |
| | Zuglói evangélikus kápolna | 1996 előtt | n. a. | n. a. | 1145 Budapest, Gyarmat u. 14/b. Prior to 1996, the building housed the Norwegian-Israeli Mission. |

=== Other churches ===
| Picture | Name | Construction time | Architectural style | Designer | Address, comments |
|---|---|---|---|---|---|
| | Dávid Sátora pünkösdista templom | 2007 előtt | n. a. | n. a. | 1143 Budapest, Gizella u 37. The congregation moved into an apartment building in 2007. |
| | Logos pünkösdista templom | n. a. | n. a. | n. a. | 1145 Budapest, Szugló u. 57. |
| | Agapé pünkösdista templom | n. a. | n. a. | n. a. | 1146 Budapest, Thököly út 46/b. |
| | Zuglói adventista imaház | n. a. | n. a. | n. a. | 1147 Budapest, Kerékgyártó u. 28/a. |

== District XV ==
=== Roman Catholic churches ===
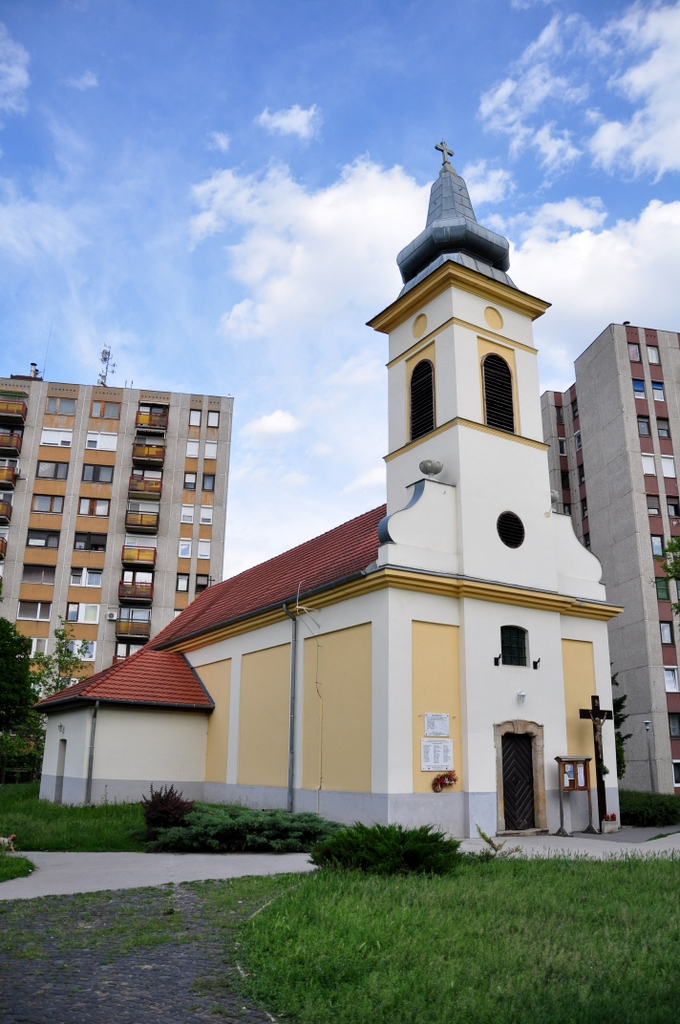
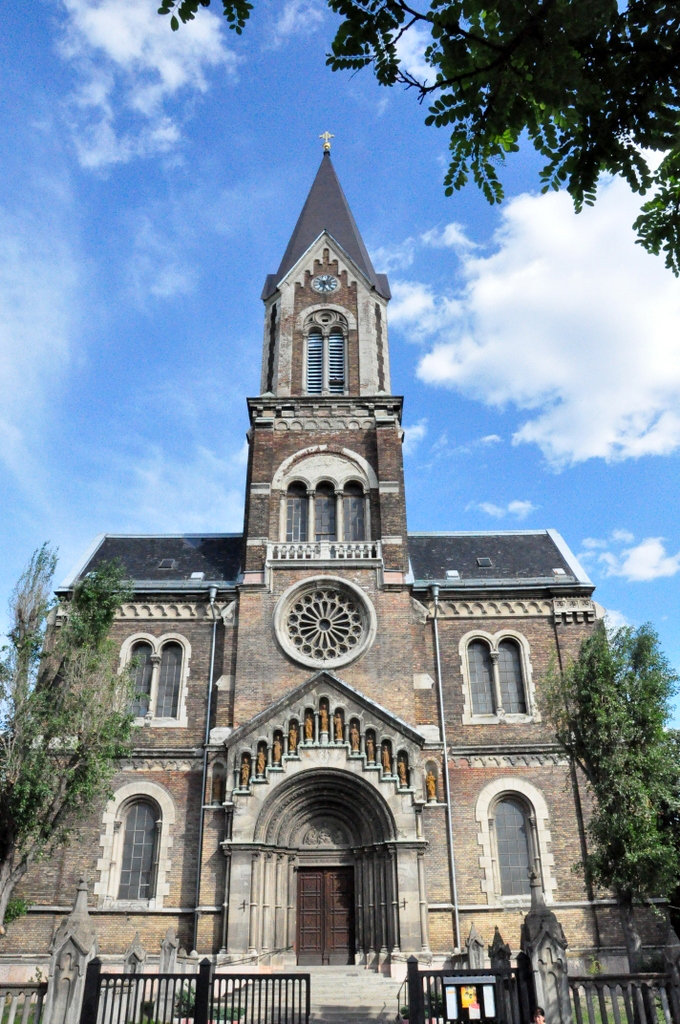
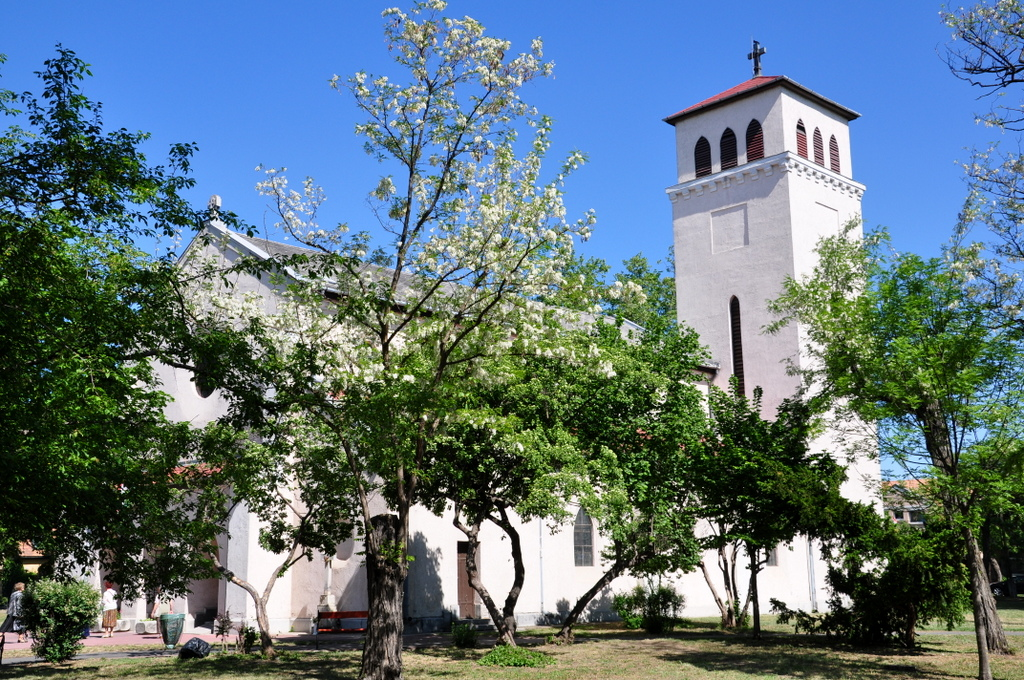
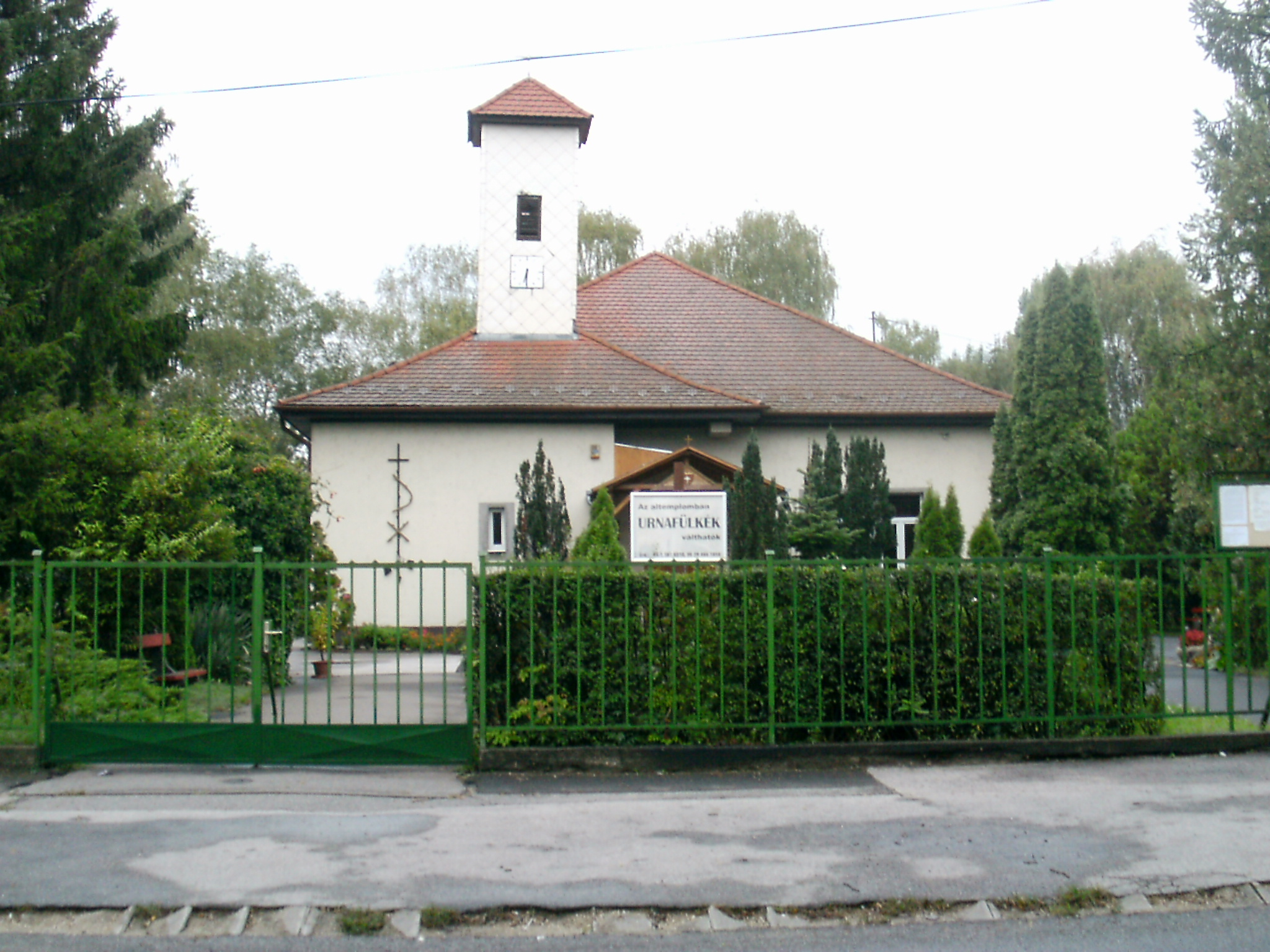
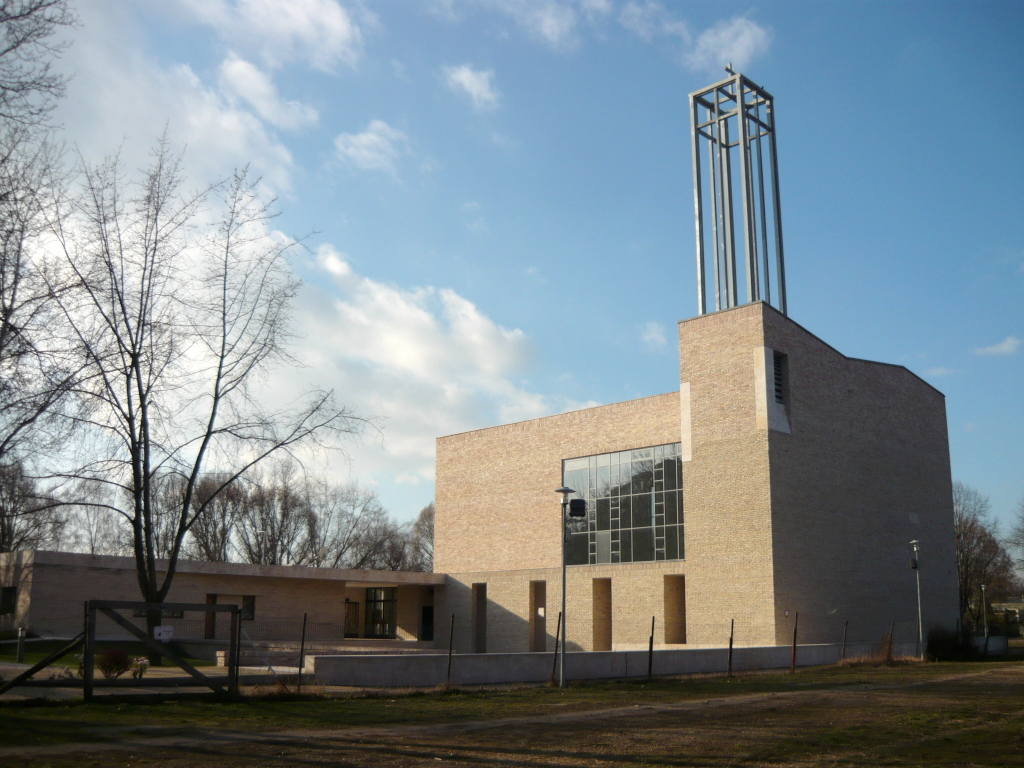
| Picture | Name | Construction time | Architectural style | Designer | Address, comments |
|---|---|---|---|---|---|
| | Rákospalotai Szentháromság-templom | 1735 | baroque | n. a. | 1151 Budapest, Kossuth utca 55/b. |
| | Magyarok Nagyasszonya-templom | 1896–1909 | neo-romanesque | Balassa Ernő | 1153 Budapest, Széchenyi tér |
| | Keresztelő Szent János-templom | 1926–1927 | n. a. | n. a. | 1158 Budapest, Klebelsberg Kunó u. 43. |
| | Budapest Rákospalota MÁV-telepi Jézus Szíve Templom | 1934–1935 | n. a. | Heintz Béla | 1155 Budapest, Mozdonyvezető u. 2. |
| | Rákospalotai Árpád-házi Szent Margit templom | 1944–1949 | n. a. | n. a. | 1151 Budapest, Vácrátót tér 3. |
| | Urunk színeváltozása és Boldog Salkaházi Sára templom | 2006–2008 | modern | n. a. | 1156 Budapest, Pattogós utca 1. |

=== Reformed churches ===
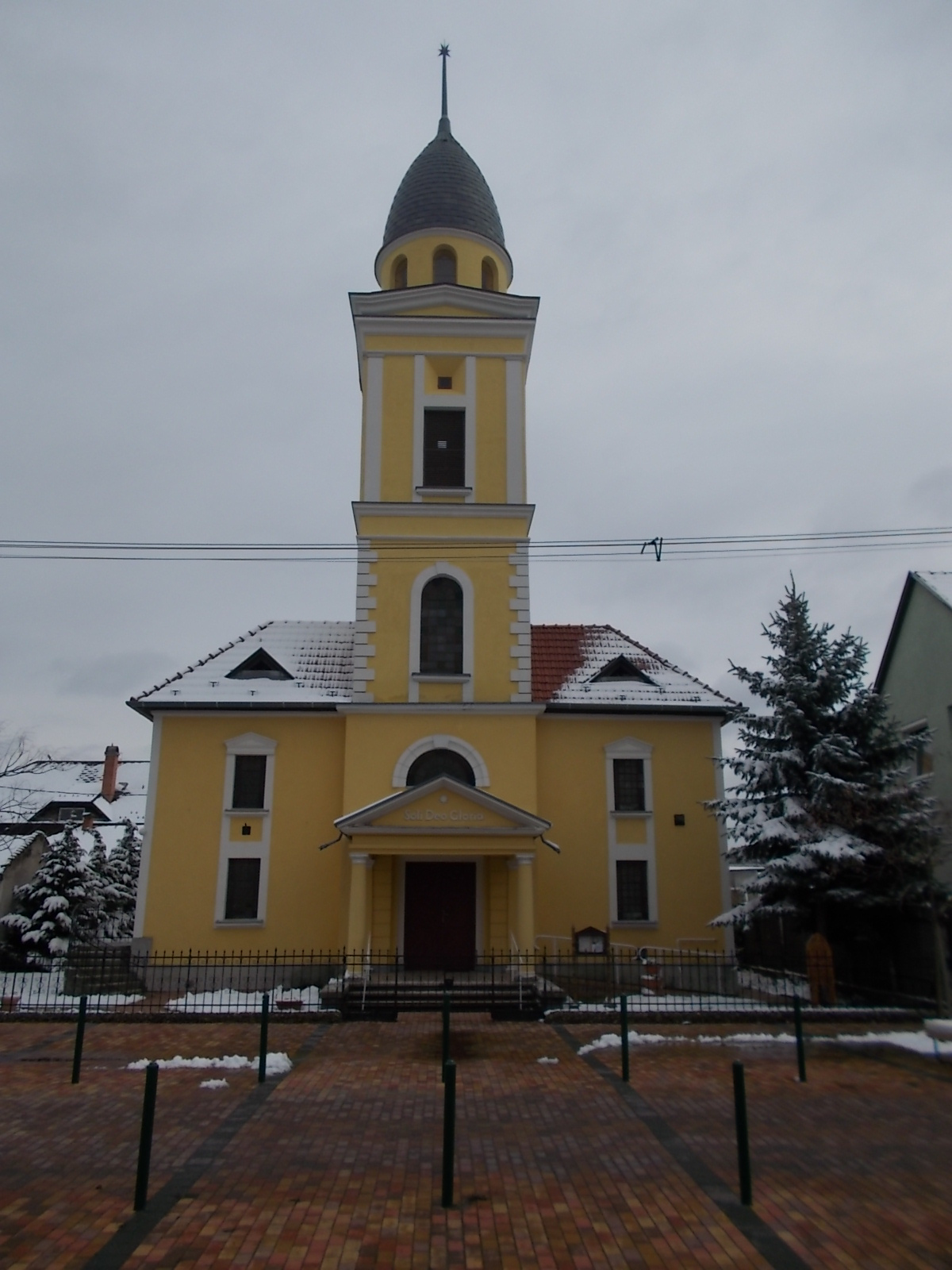
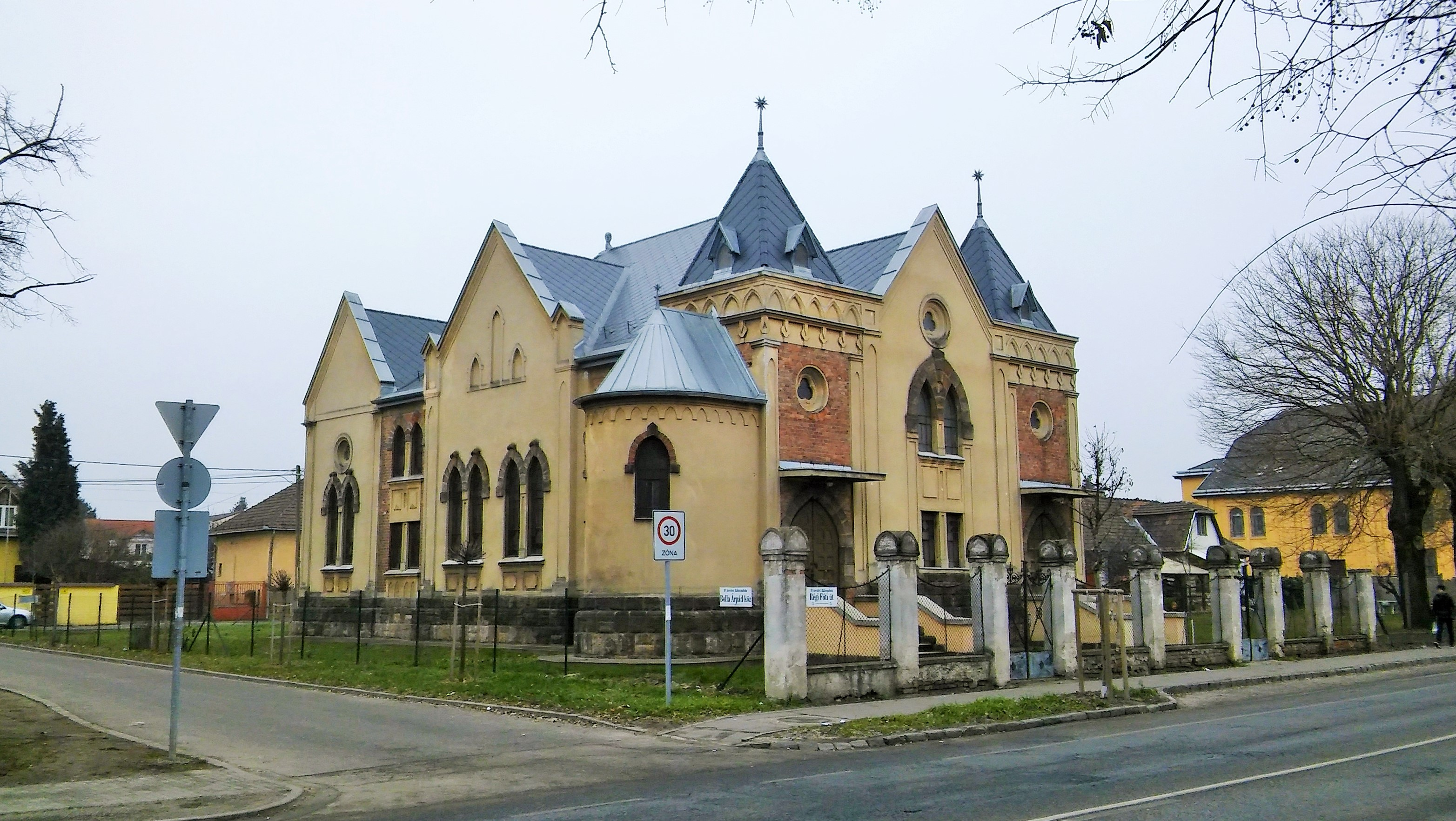
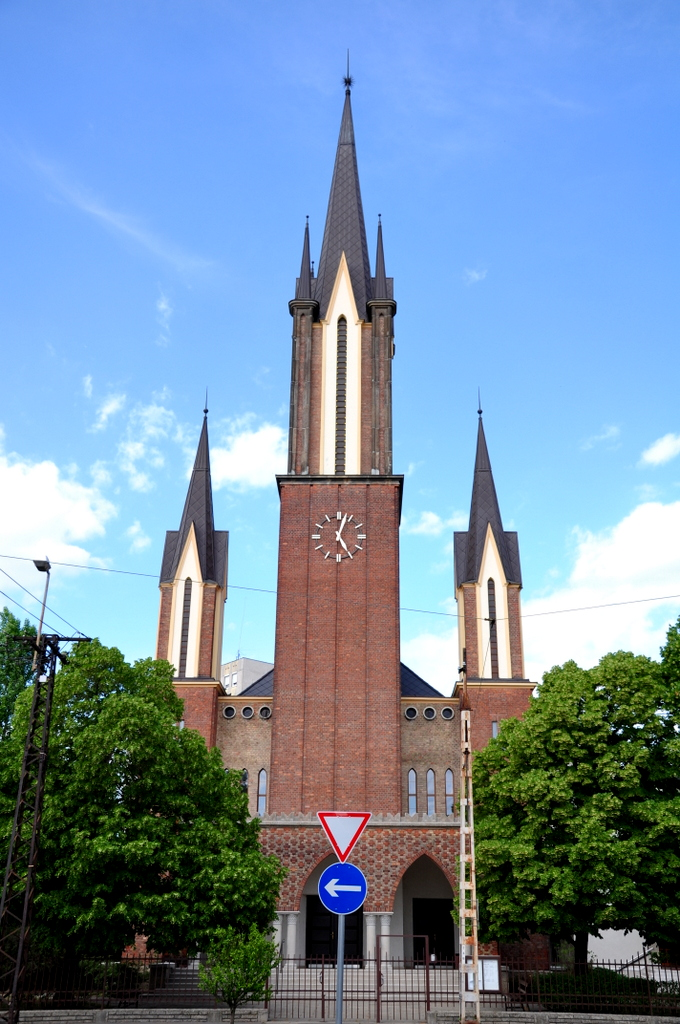
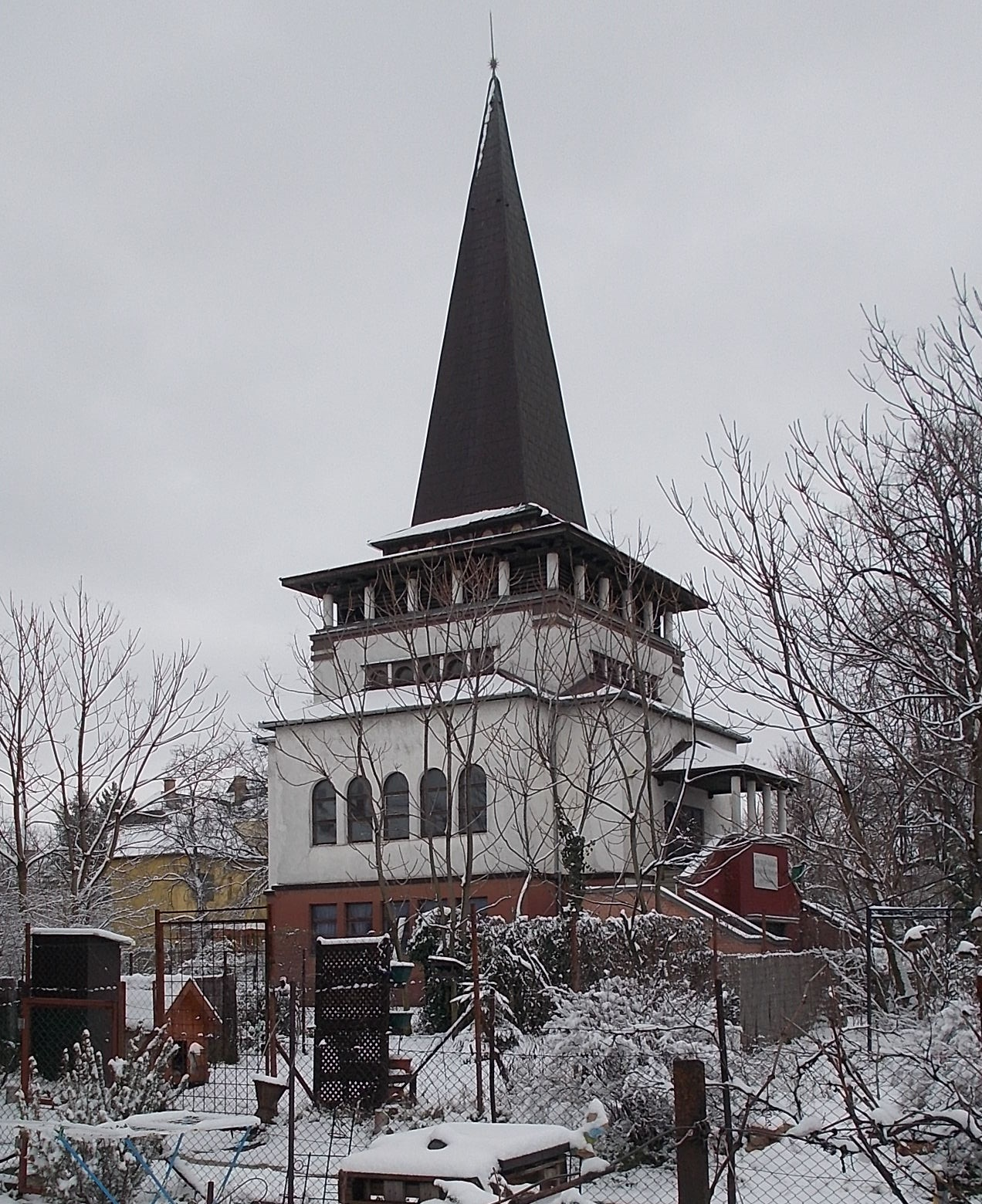
| Picture | Name | Construction time | Architectural style | Designer | Address, comments |
|---|---|---|---|---|---|
| | Pestújhelyi református templom | 1928 | neo-classicist | Van Beek János | 1158 Budapest, Sztárai Mihály tér 3. |
| | Régi Fóti úti református templom | 1927–1928 | neo-romanesque | Van Beek János | 1152 Budapest, Régi Fóti út 75. |
| | Rákospalota-újvárosi református templom | 1933–1936 | n. a. | n. a. | 1152 Budapest, Rákos út 71–75. |
| | Rákospalota-óvárosi református templom | 1938–1941 | Art Déco | n. a. | 1151 Budapest, Kossuth Lajos utca 1. |
| | Ősrákosi református templom | 1939–1944 | Hungarian folk | Csaba Rezső | 1155 Budapest, Széchenyi út 18. |
| | Újpalotai református templom | 2016–2018 | n. a. | n. a. | 1159 Budapest, Kontyfa u. 6. |

=== Evangelical churches ===
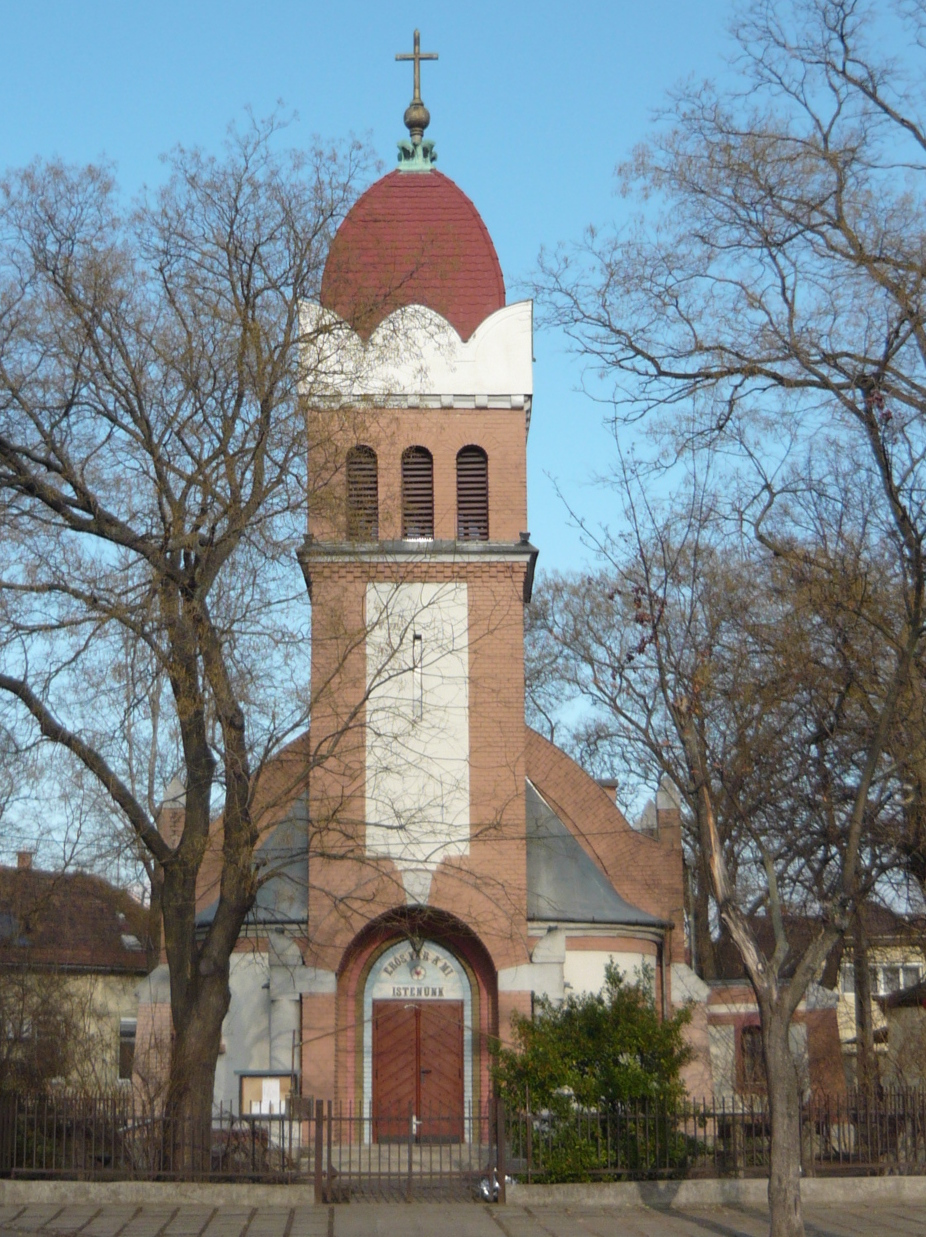
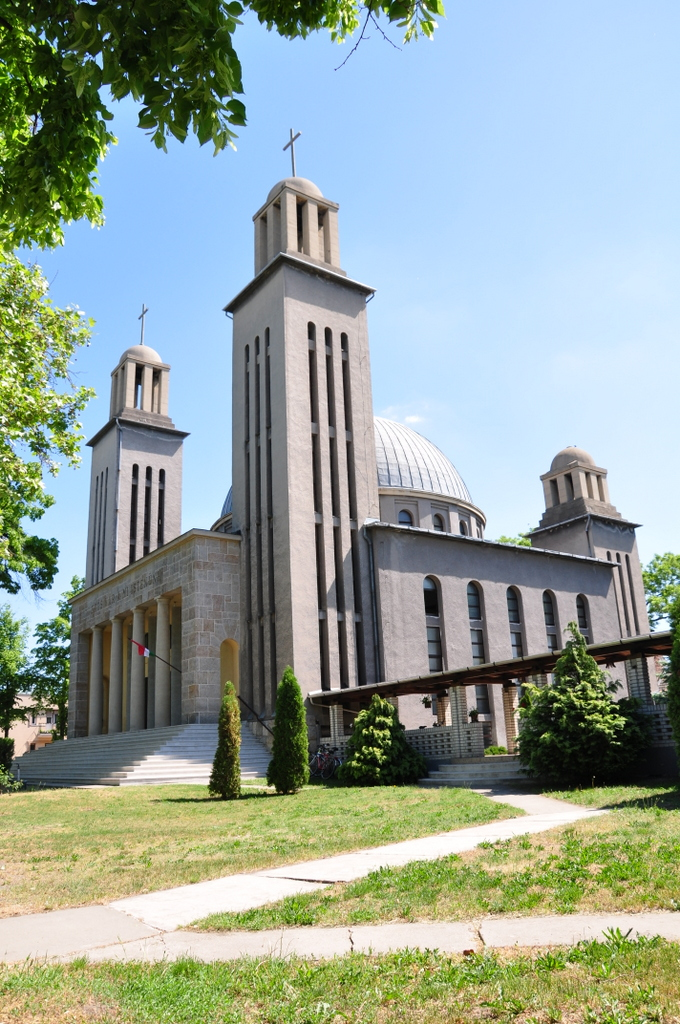
| Picture | Name | Construction time | Architectural style | Designer | Address, comments |
|---|---|---|---|---|---|
| | Rákospalotai evangélikus kistemplom | 1855 | romantic (?) | n. a. | 1152 Budapest, Juhos u. 28. |
| | Pestújhely-Újpalotai evangélikus templom | 1933 | neo-romanesque (?) | Gyula Sándy | 1158 Budapest, Templom tér 10. |
| | Rákospalotai evangélikus nagytemplom | 1936–1941 | modern | László György, Szalkay Jenő | 1152 Budapest, Régi Fóti út 73. |

=== Other churches ===
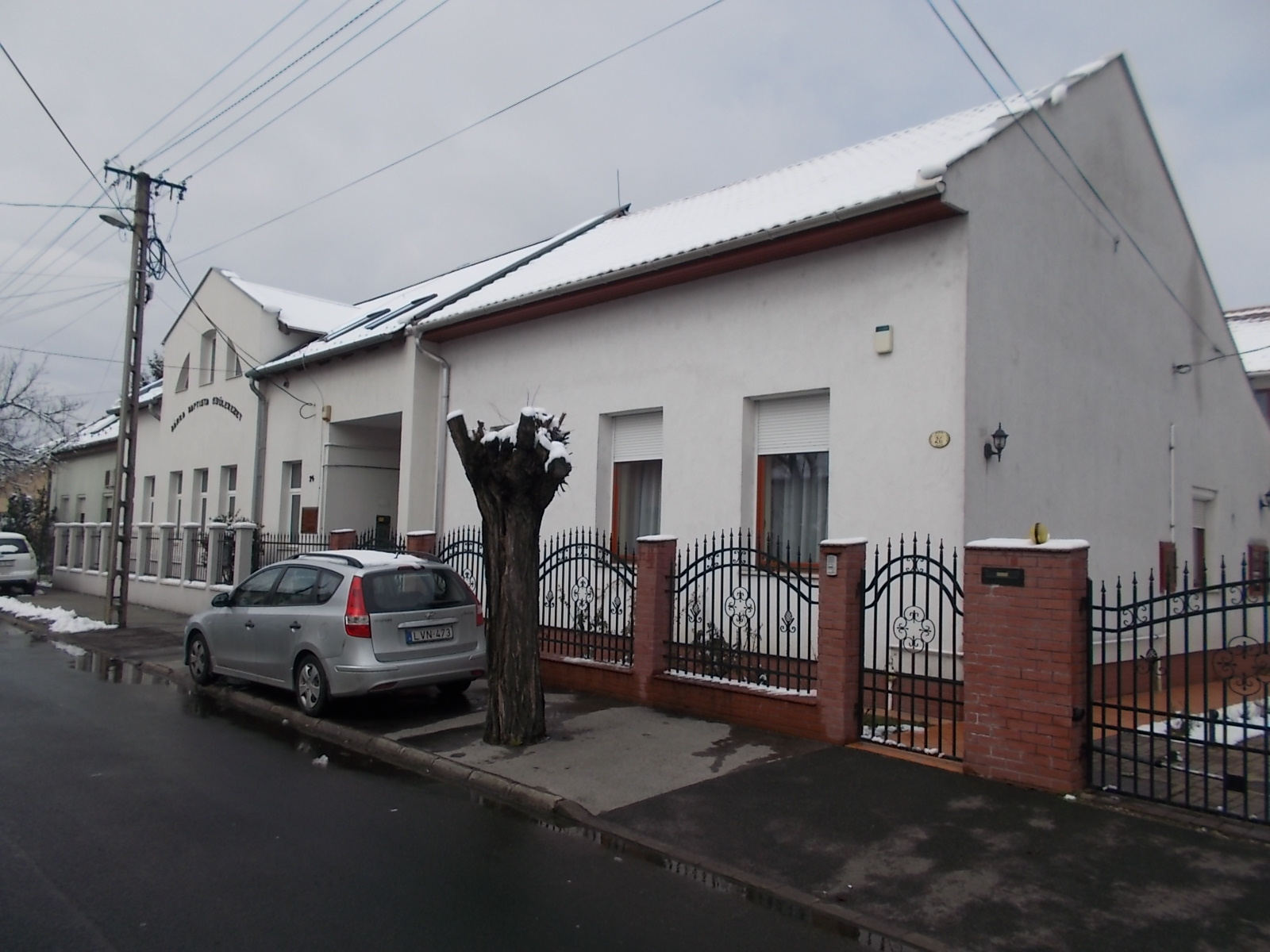
| Picture | Name | Construction time | Architectural style | Designer | Address, comments |
|---|---|---|---|---|---|
| | Rákospalotai baptista temploma | 1933–1937 | n. a. | Béla Marosi | 1152 Budapest, Kinizsi u. 86. |
| | Bárka Baptista Gyülekezet temploma | 2003 | n. a. | n. a. | 1158 Budapest, Adria utca 24. |

== District XVI ==
=== Roman Catholic churches ===
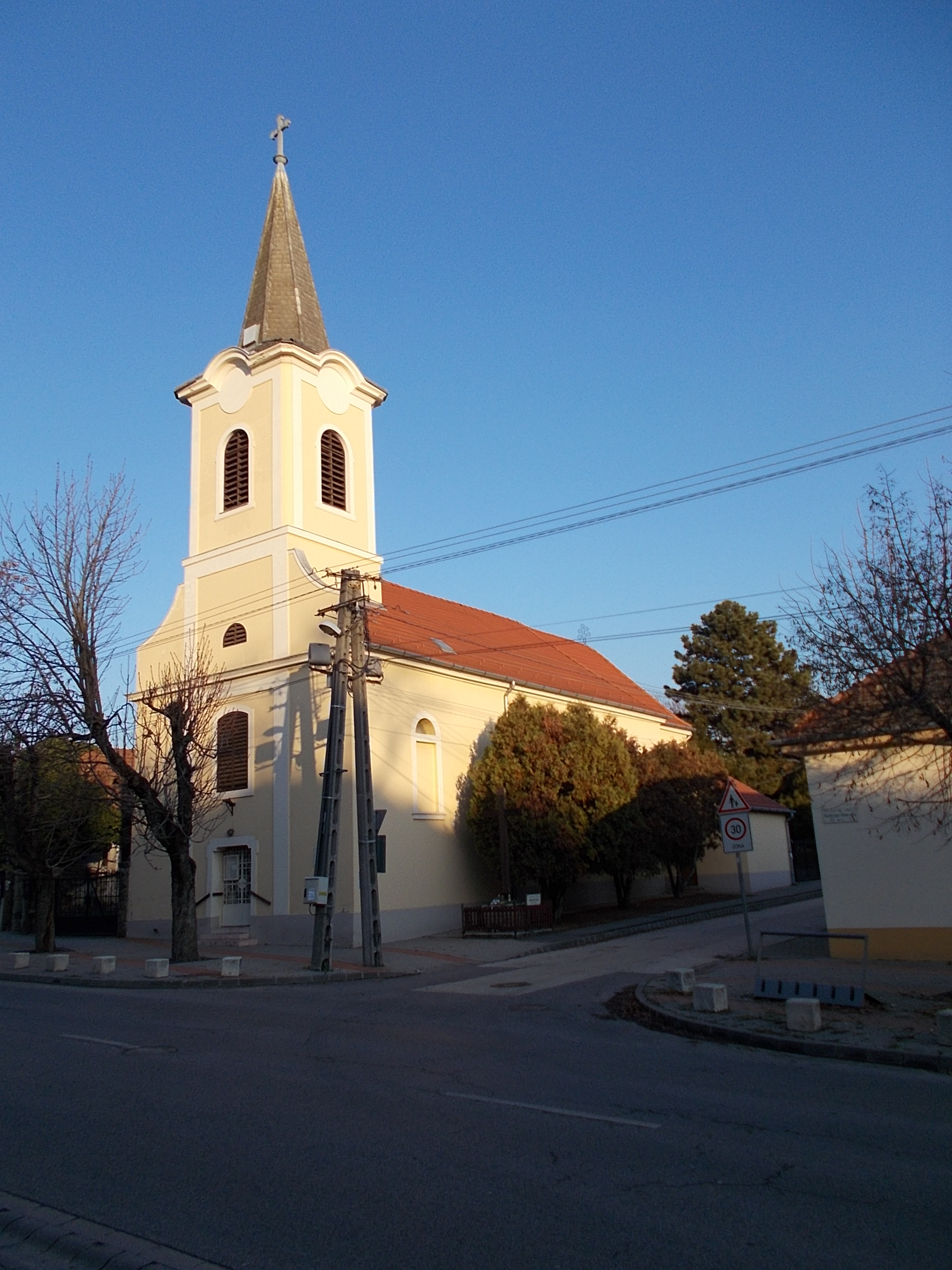
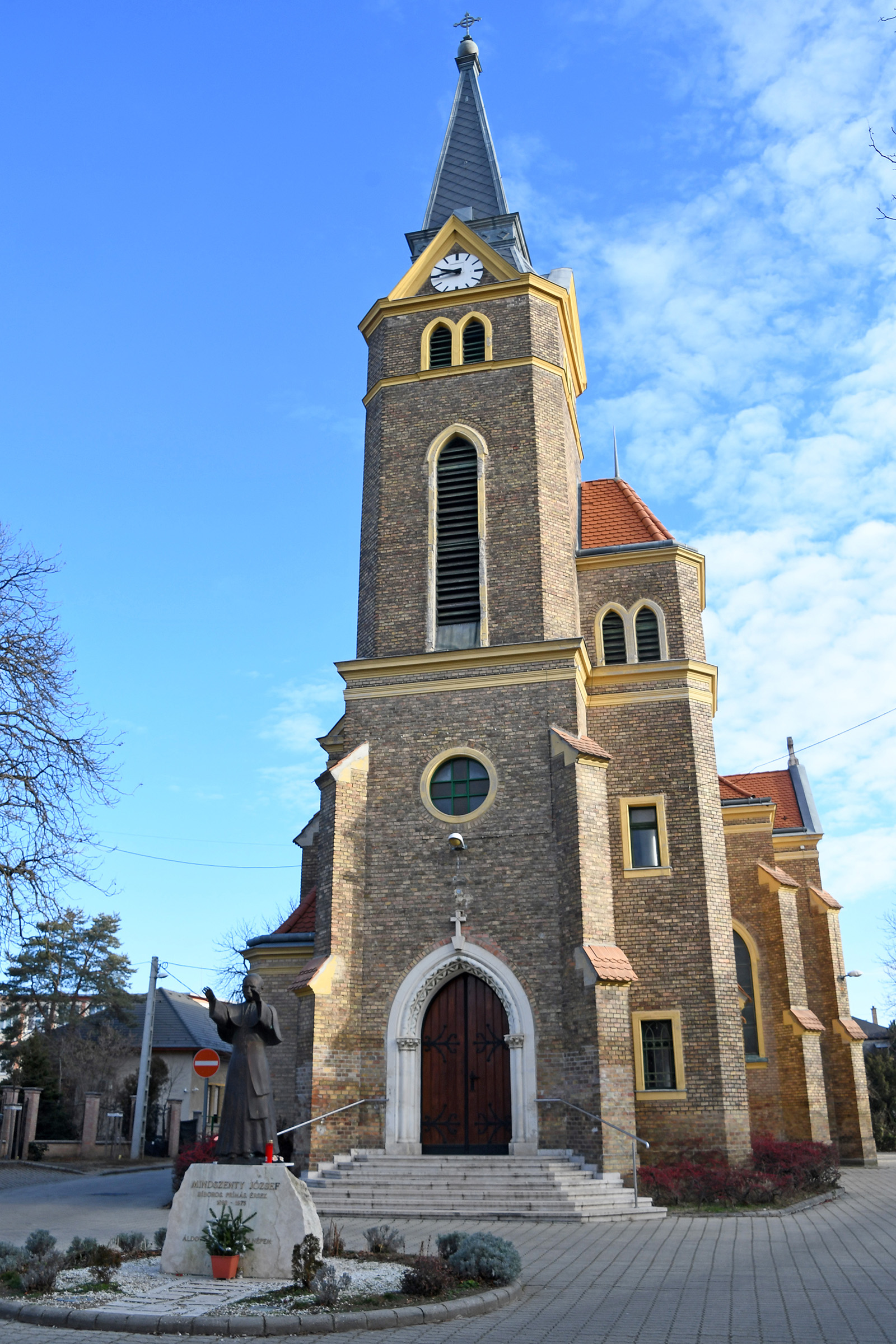
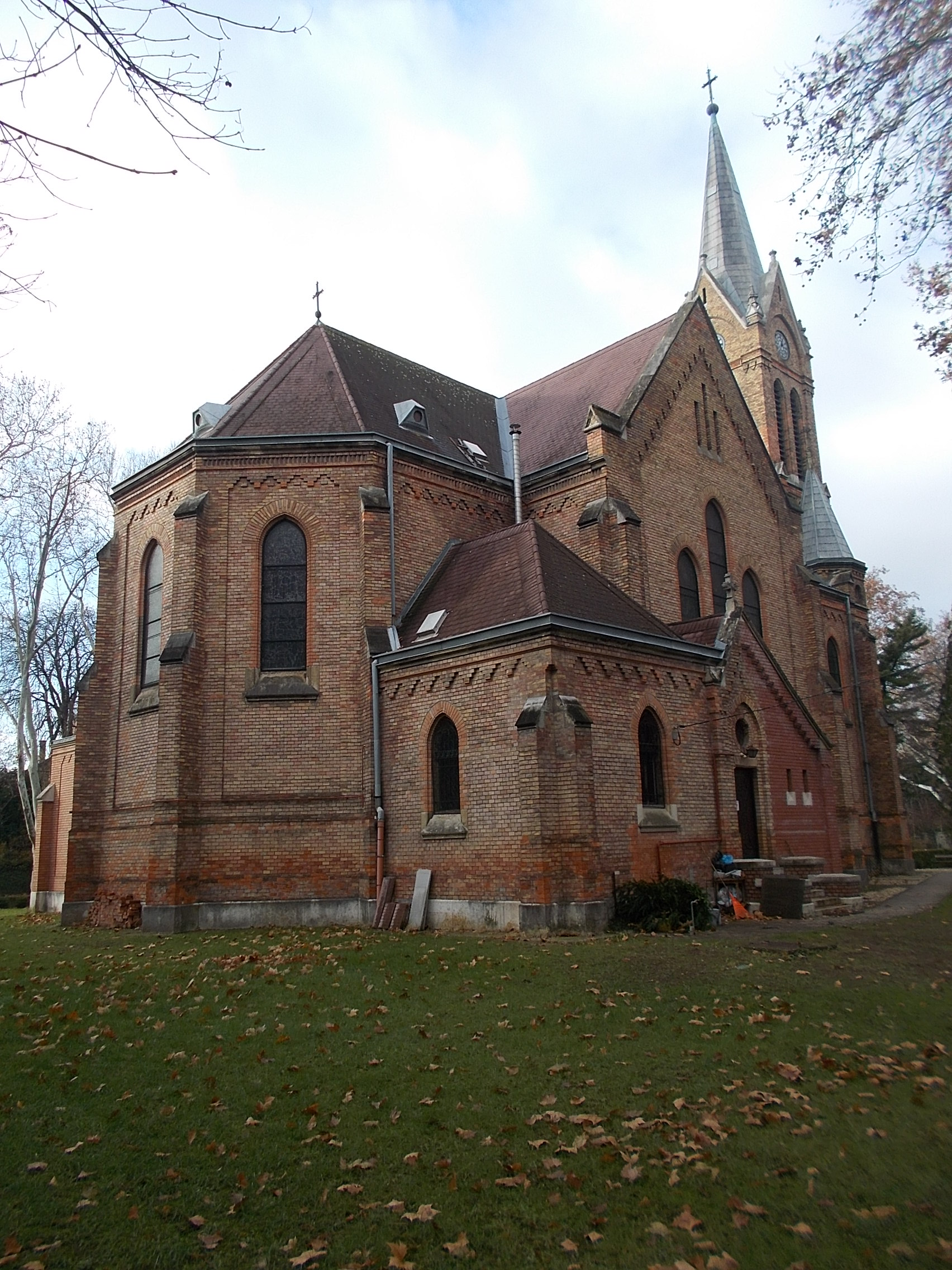
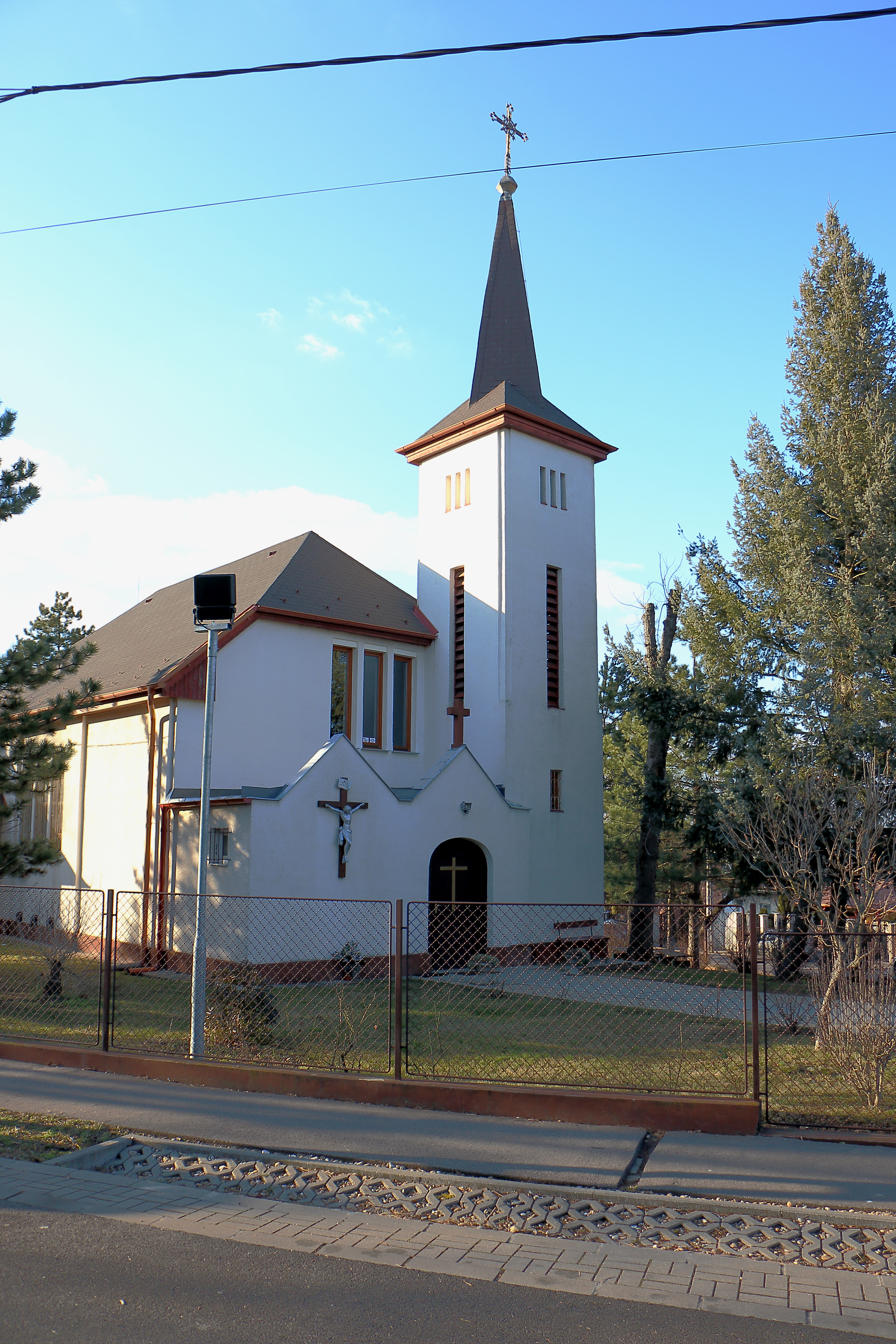
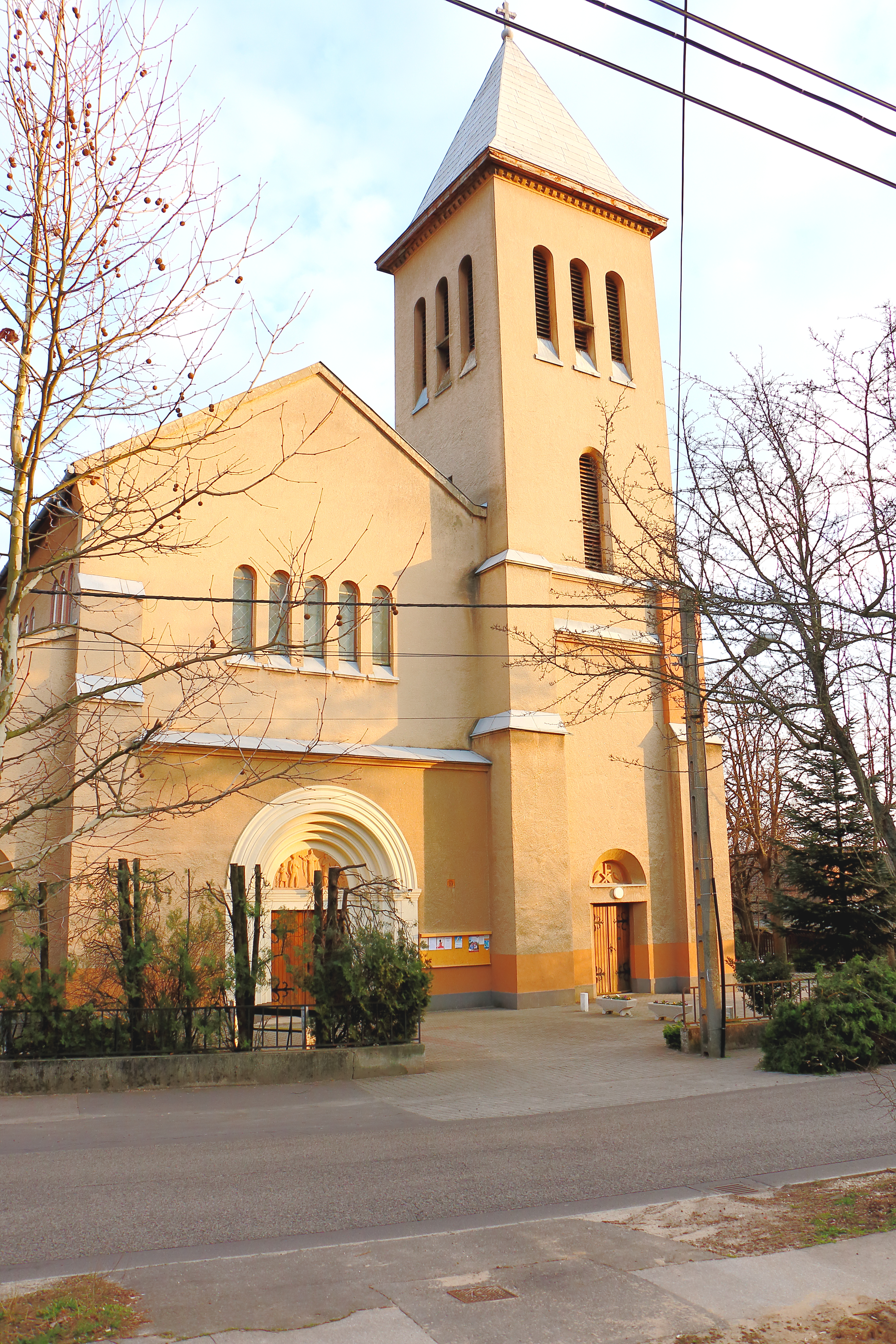
| Picture | Name | Construction time | Architectural style | Designer | Address, comments |
|---|---|---|---|---|---|
| | Cinkotai Szent Mária Magdolna templom | 1747 | baroque | n. a. | 1164 Budapest, Batthyány Ilona u. 21. |
| | Rákosszentmihályi Szent Mihály-templom | 1902 | neogothic | Módl Lajos | 1161 Budapest, Templom tér 3. |
| | Mátyásföldi Szent József templom | 1904–1905 | neogothic | Weninger Ferenc | 1165 Budapest, Paulheim József tér 1. |
| | Cinkotai temető kápolnája | 1924 | n. a. | n. a. | It was built by the Fritsche family, but was open to everyone. |
| | Árpádföldi Szent Anna templom | 1925–1927 | Hungarian folk (?) | Csemegi József | 1162 Budapest Állás utca 70. |
| | Sashalmi Krisztus Király plébániatemplom | 1927–1931 | neo-romanesque | Lechner Lóránd | 1163 Budapest, Sasvár u. 23. |
| | Rákosszentmihályi Szent Imre-templom | n. a. | n. a. | n. a. | 1162 Budapest, Párta u. 32–34. |
| | Rákosszentmihályi Fájadalmas Szűzanya kápolna | n. a. | n. a. | n. a. | 1161 Budapest, Csömöri út 140. |

=== Reformed churches ===
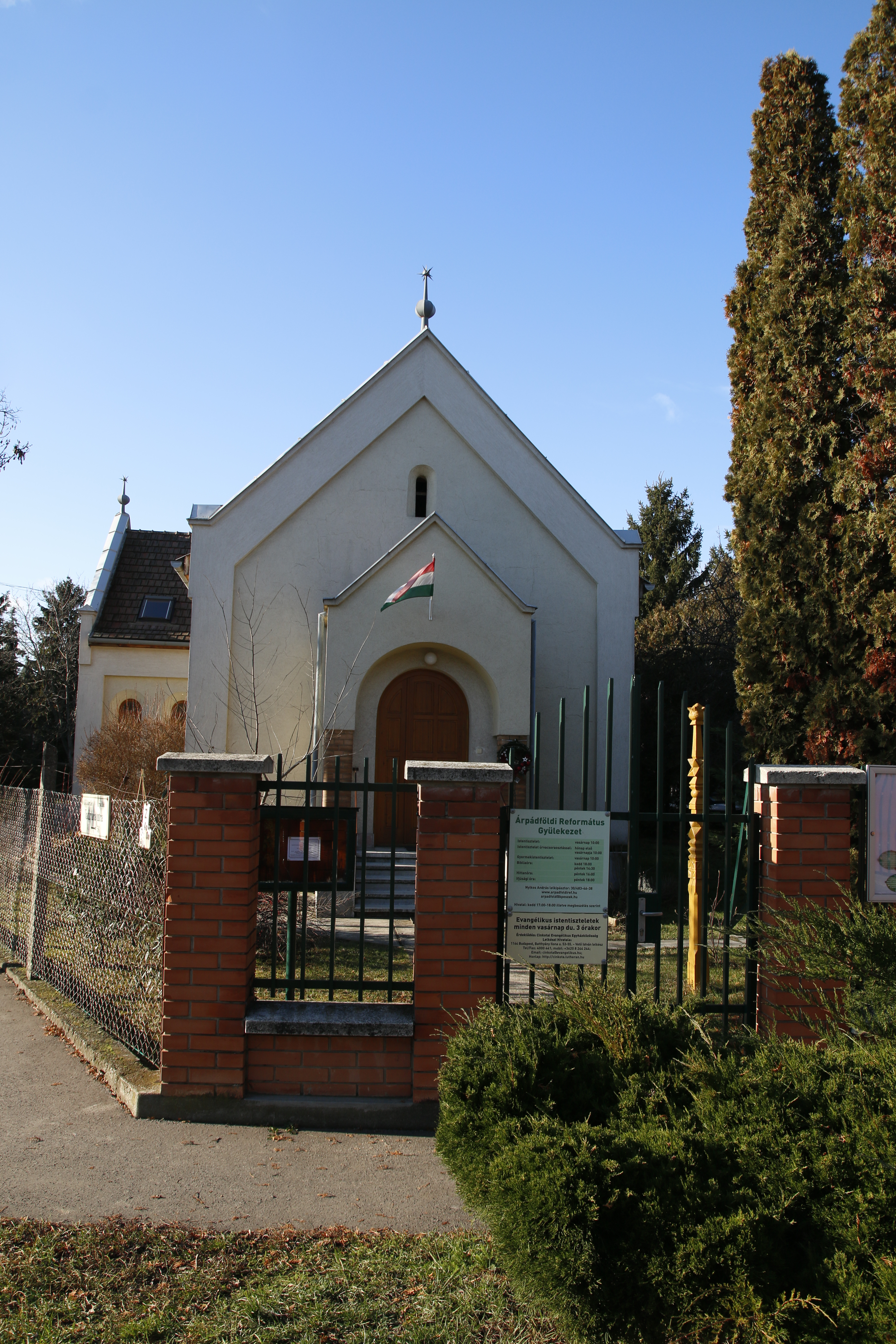
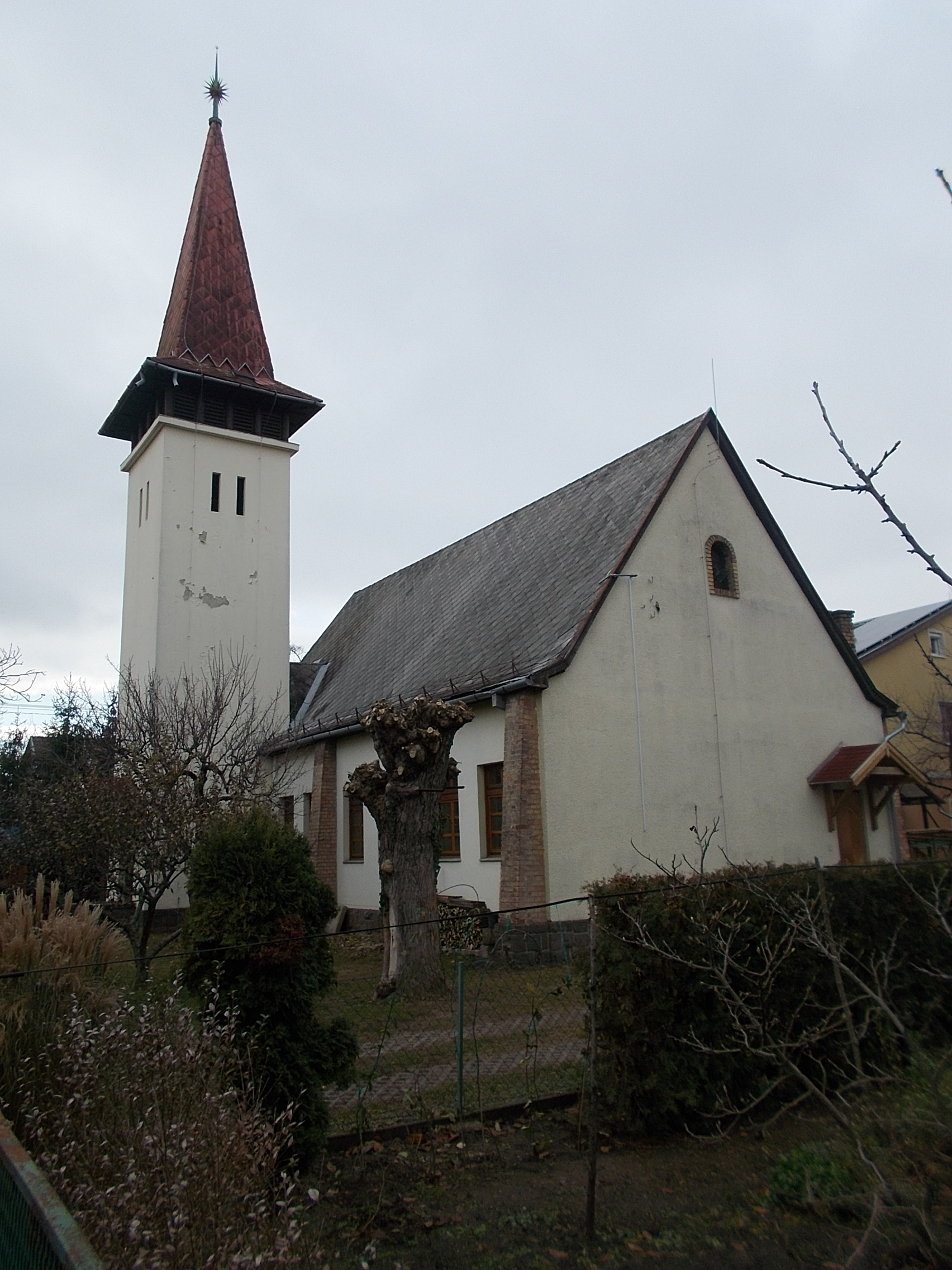
| Picture | Name | Construction time | Architectural style | Designer | Address, comments |
|---|---|---|---|---|---|
| | Sashalmi református templom | 1929 | Hungarian folk (?) | n. a. | 1161 Budapest, Budapesti út 82–84. |
| | Árpádföldi református templom | 1935–1936 | neo-romanesque (?) | n. a. | 1162 Budapest, Menyhért u. 42. |
| | Mátyásföldi református templom | 1937–1939 | Hungarian folk | Csaba Rezső | 1165 Budapest, Baross Gábor u. 23. |

=== Evangelical churches ===
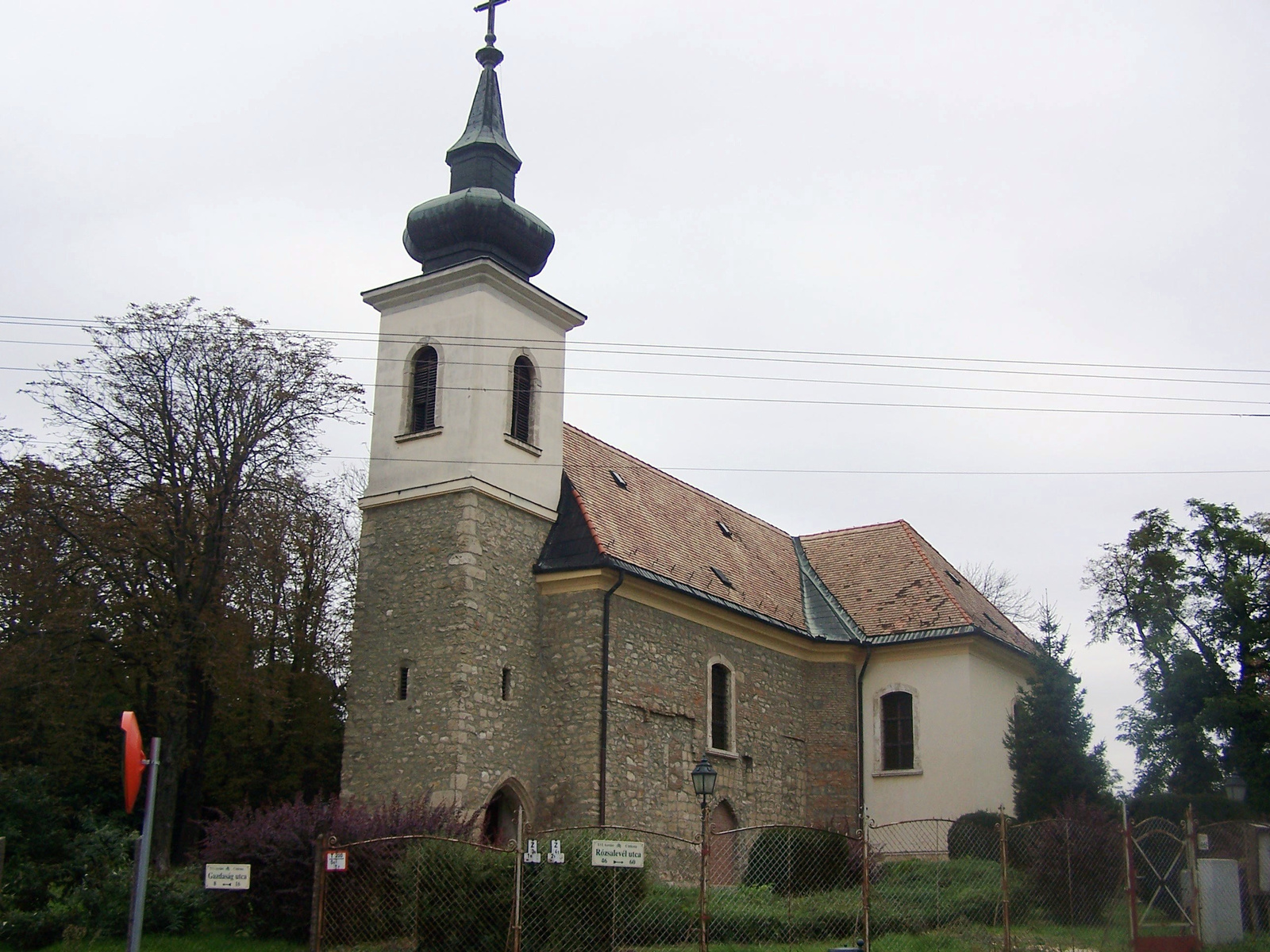
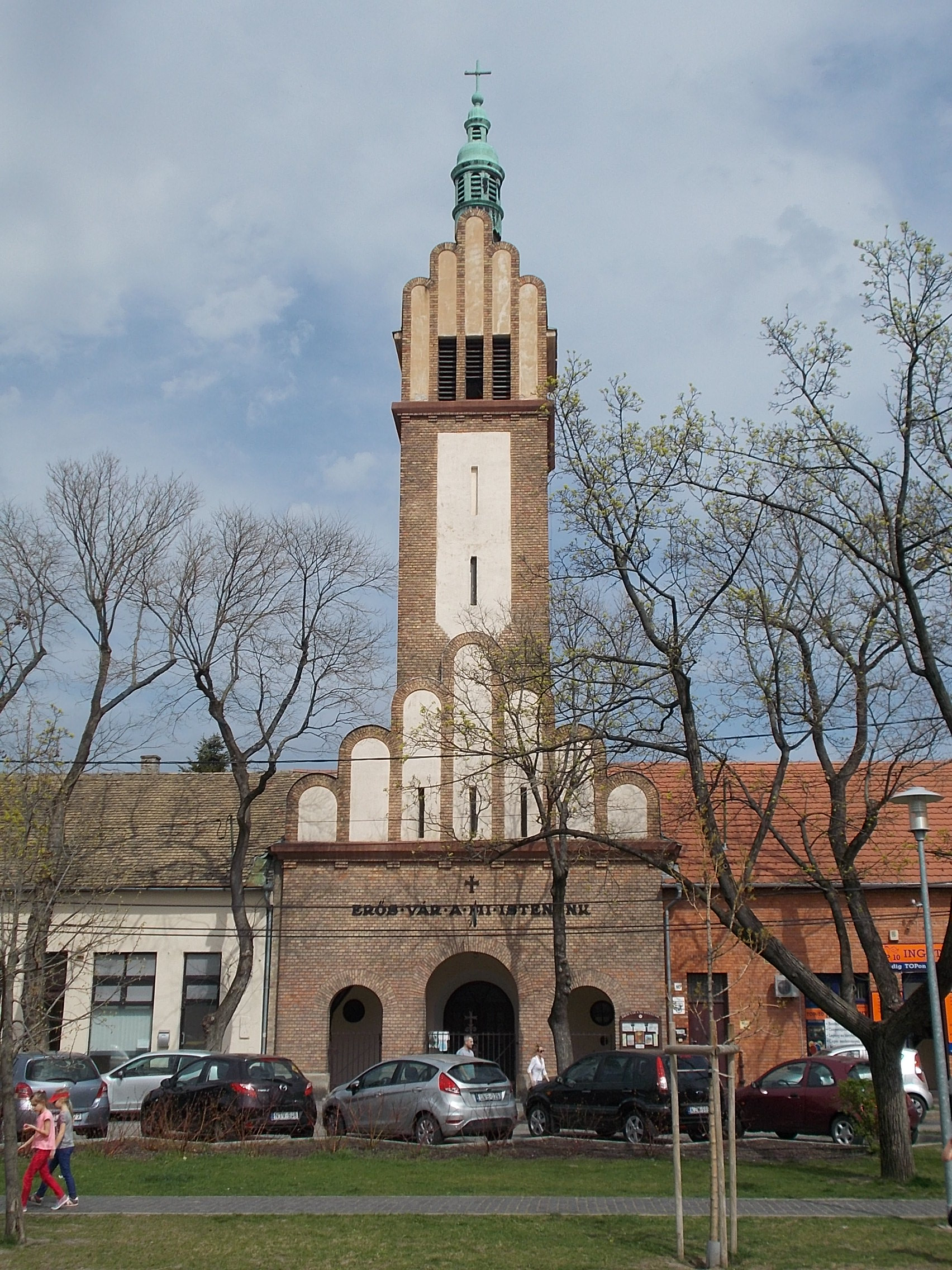
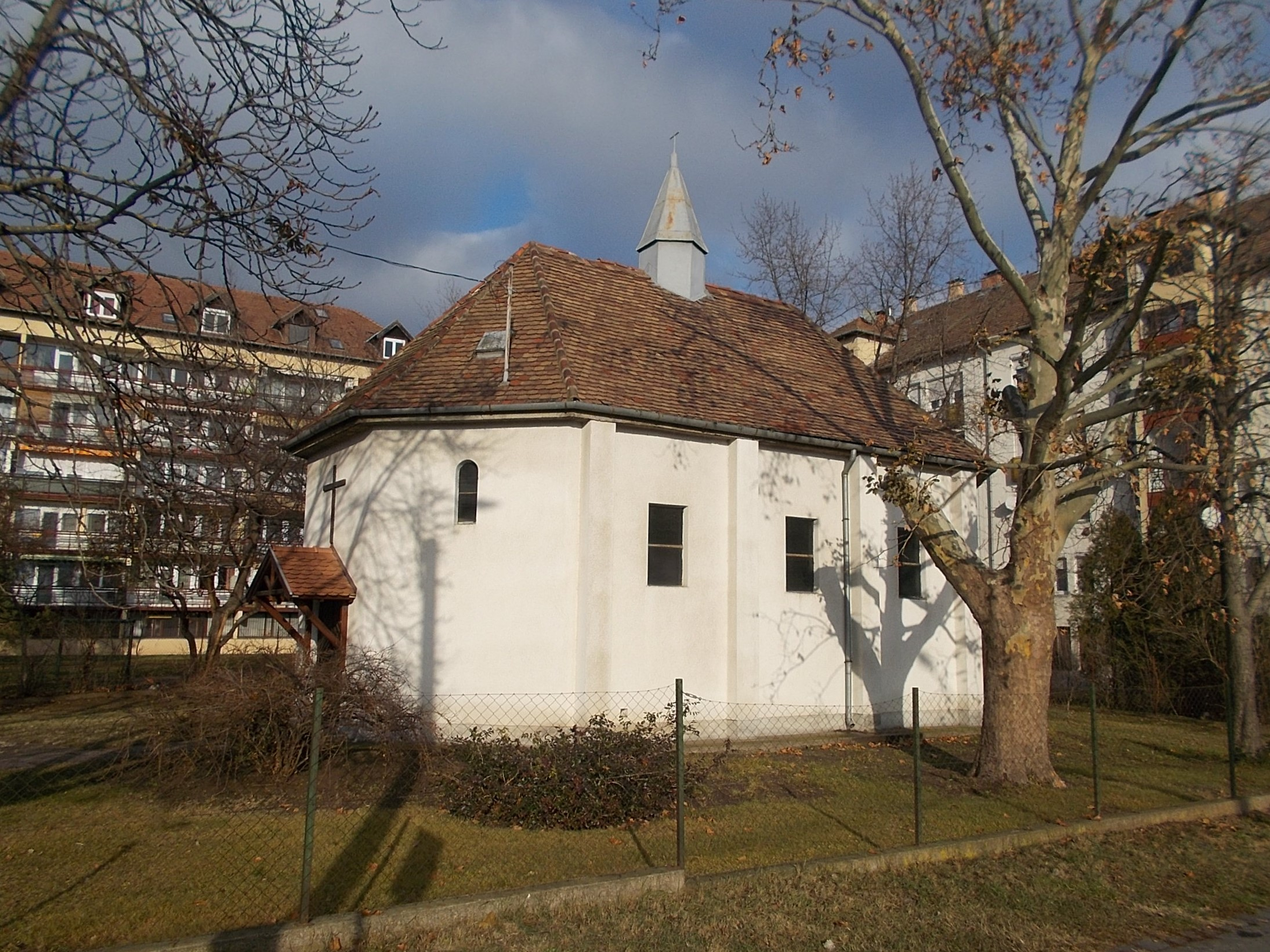
| Picture | Name | Construction time | Architectural style | Designer | Address, comments |
|---|---|---|---|---|---|
| | Cinkotai evangélikus templom | 11th century | baroque (in its current form) | n. a. | 1164 Budapest, Rózsalevél u. 46. It received its present form in 1776. |
| | Rákosszentmihályi evangélikus templom | 1933–1934 | Art Déco (?) | Gyula Sándy | 1161 Budapest, Hősök tere 10–11. |
| | Mátyásföldi evangélikus templom | 1964 | n. a. | Kotsis Iván | 1165 Budapest, Prodám utca 24. |

=== Other churches ===
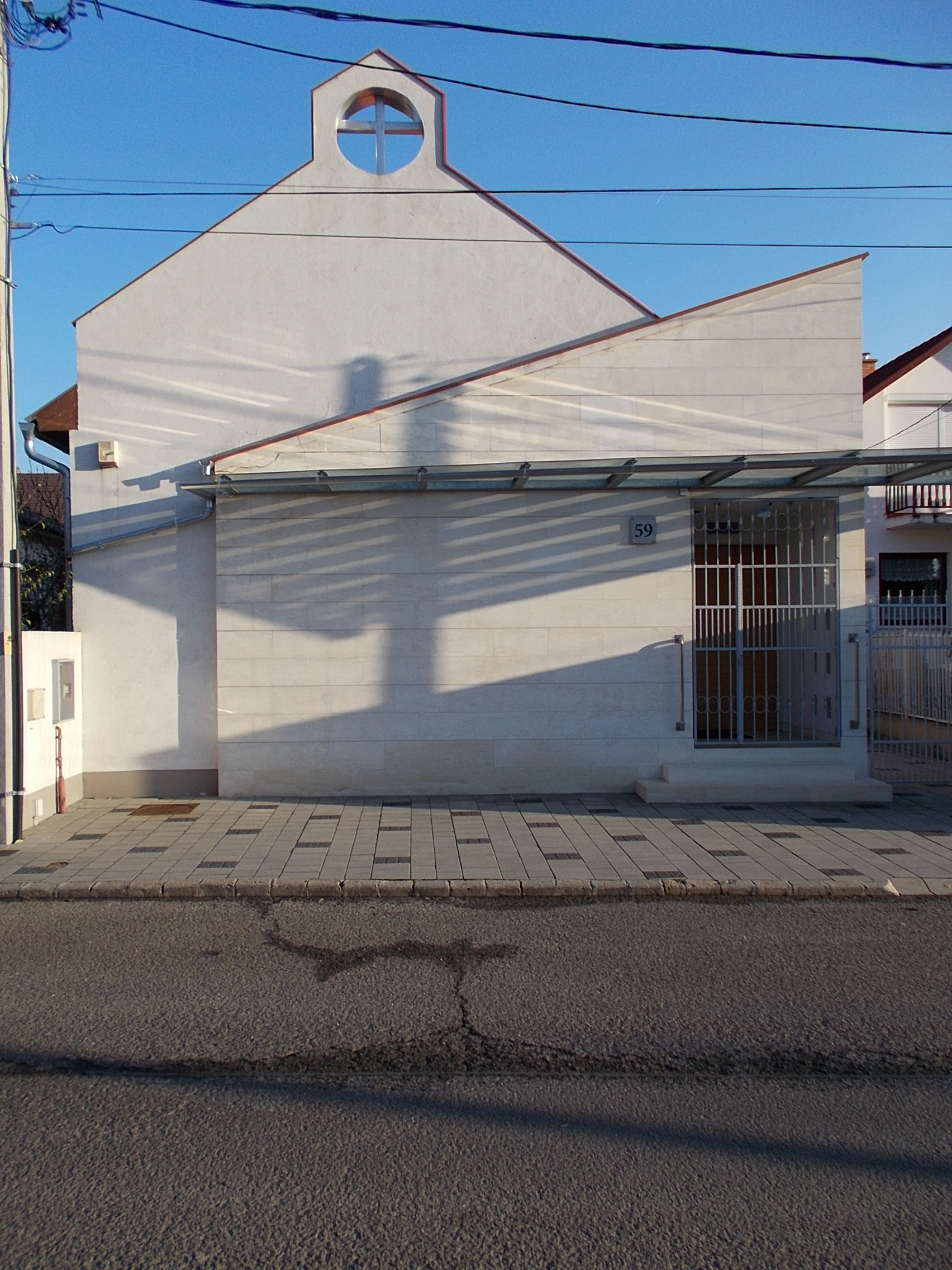
| Picture | Name | Construction time | Architectural style | Designer | Address, comments |
|---|---|---|---|---|---|
| | Sashalmi adventista imaház | n. a. | n. a. | n. a. | 1163 Budapest, Kócs u. 24. |
| | Rákosszentmihályi baptista imaház | n. a. | modern | n. a. | 1161 Budapest, Sándor u. 26. |
| | Cinkotai baptista imaház | n. a. | modern | n. a. | 1164 Budapest, Georgina utca 59. |

== District XVII ==
=== Roman Catholic churches ===
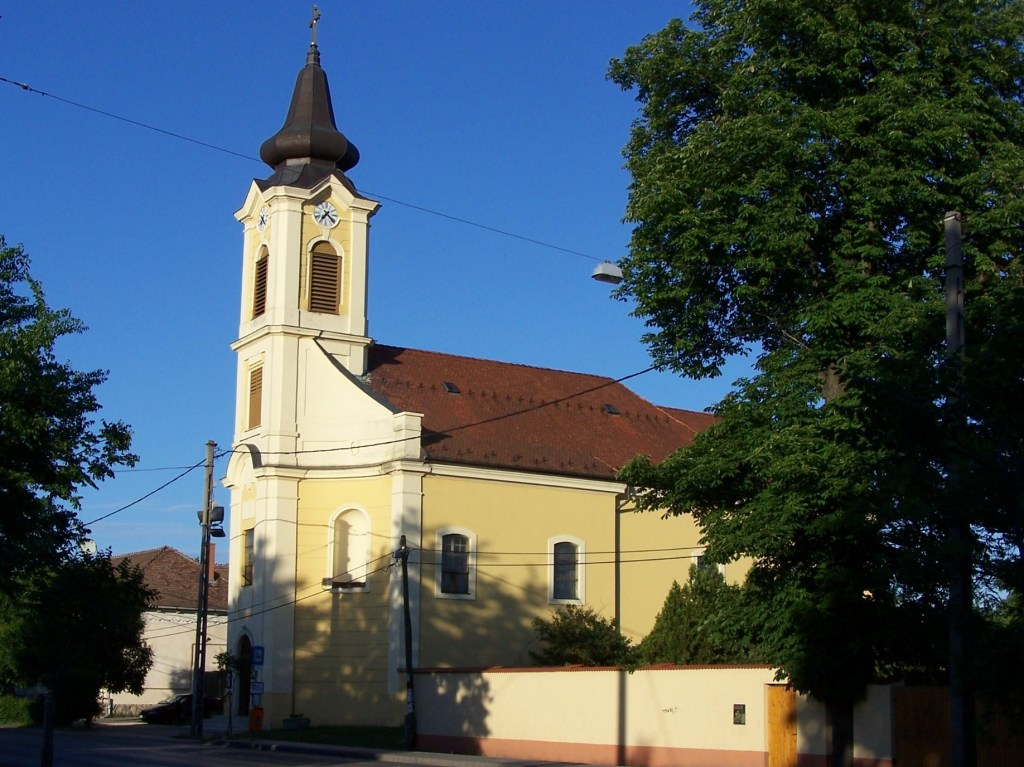
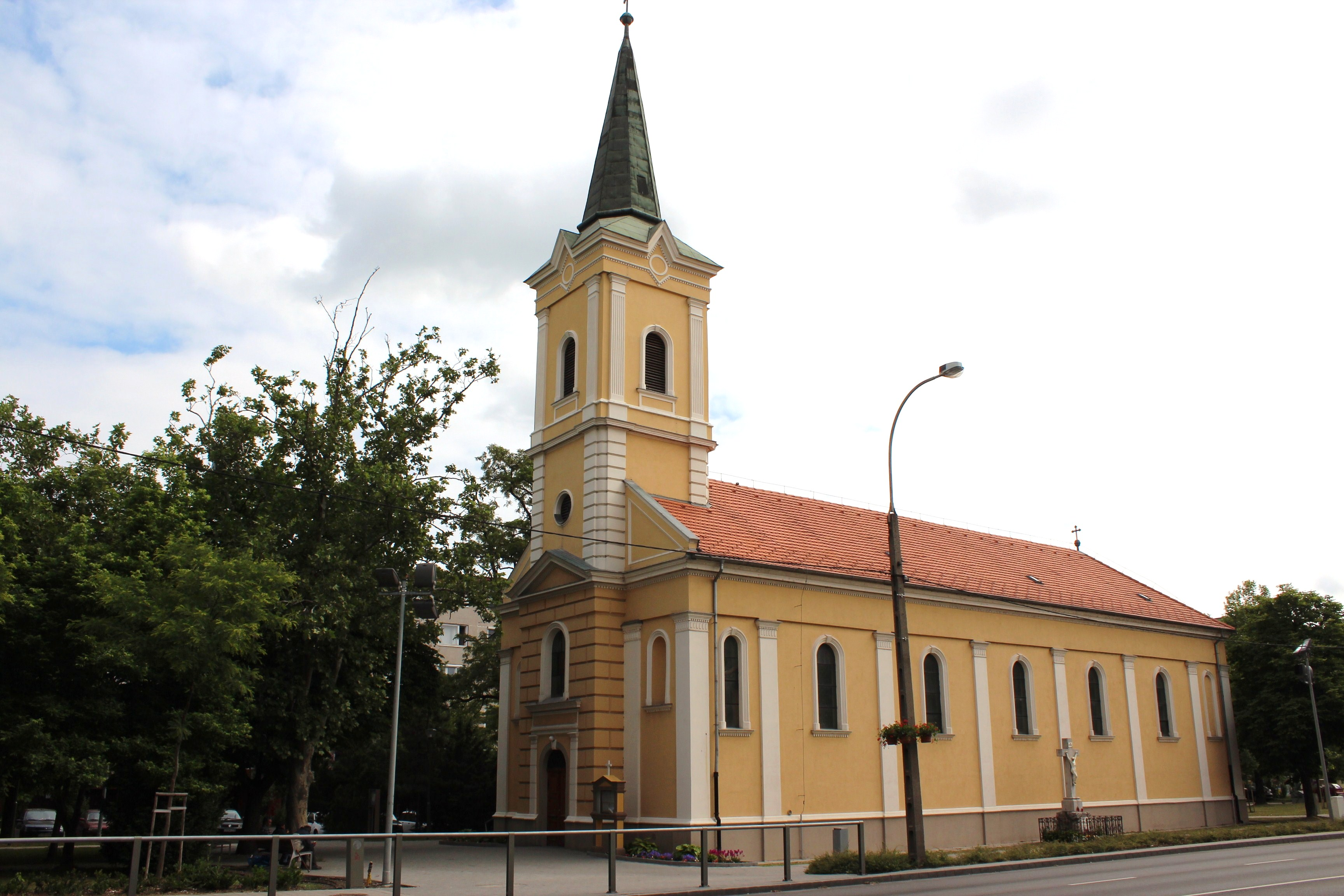
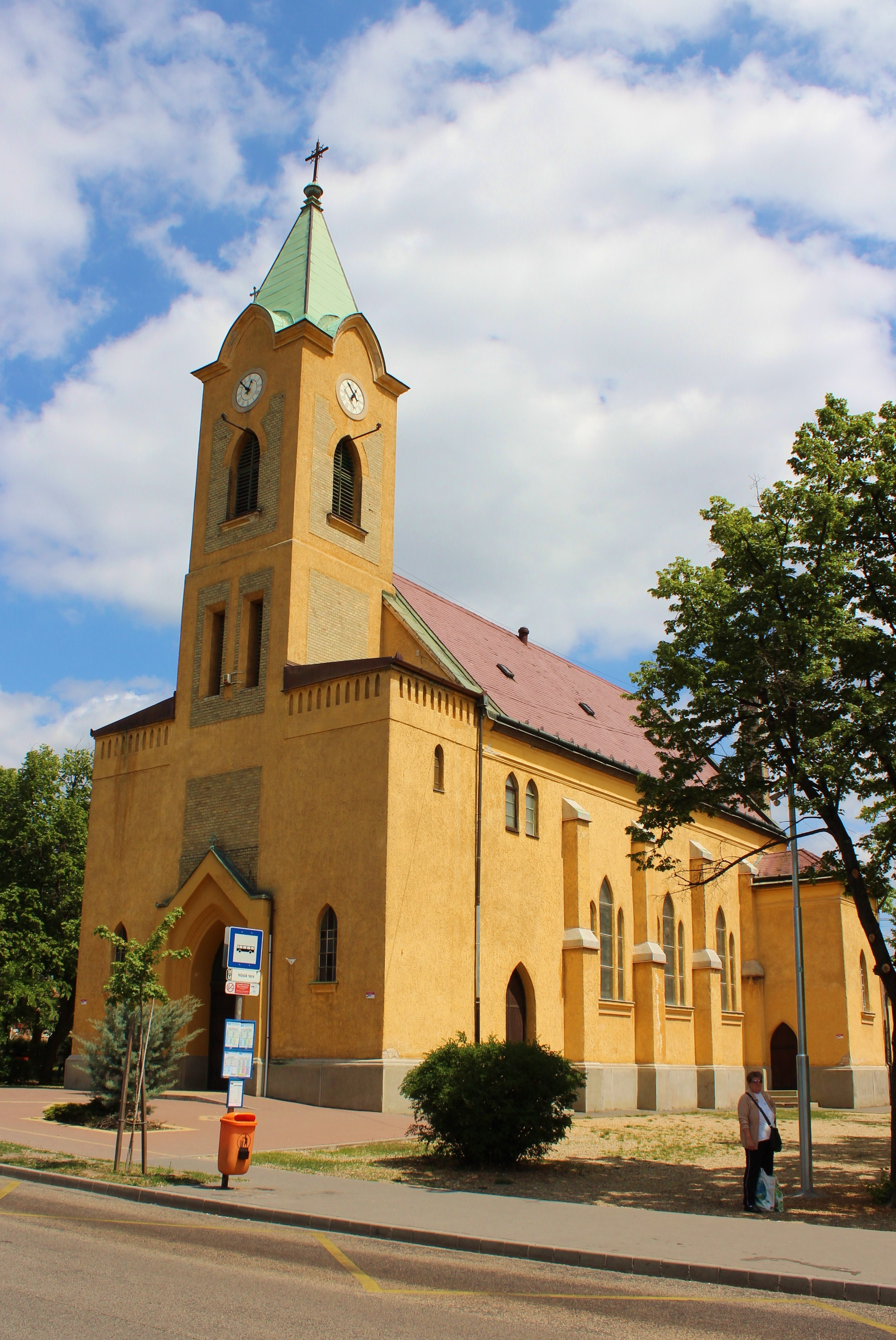
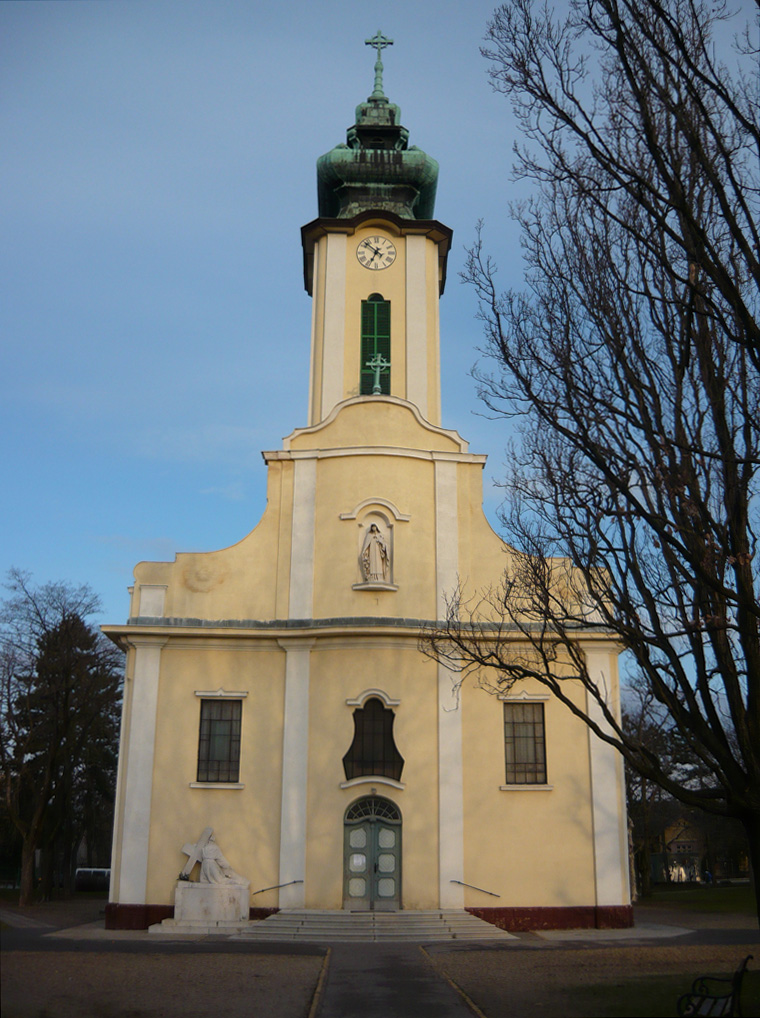
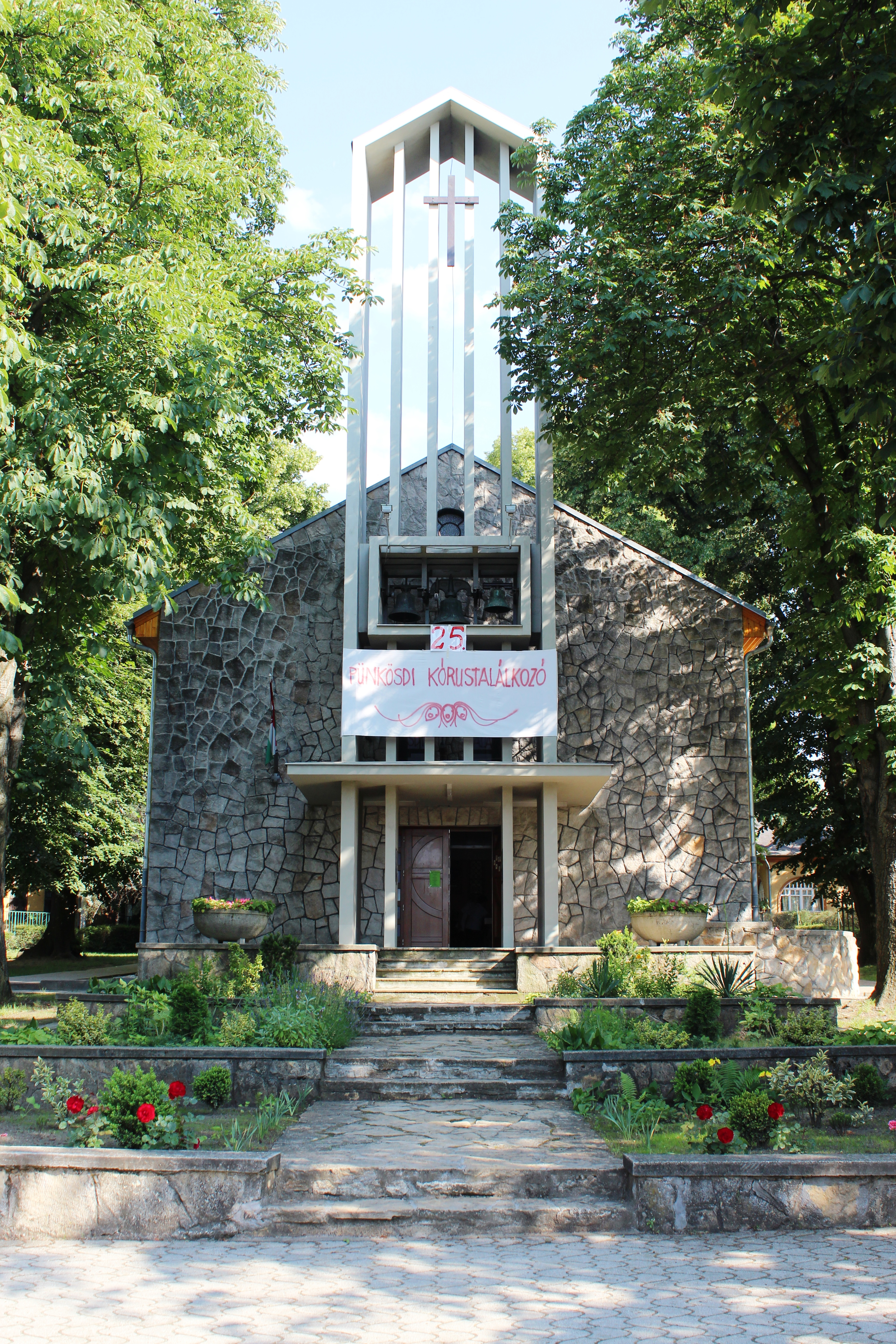
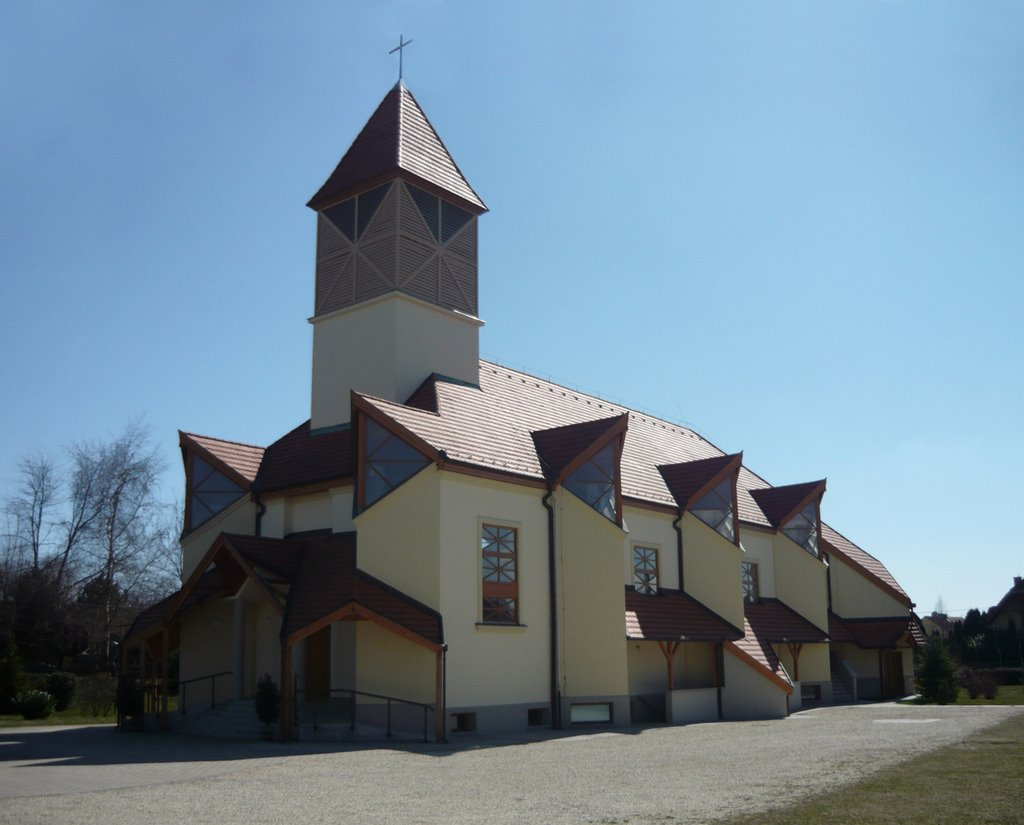
| Picture | Name | Construction time | Architectural style | Designer | Address, comments |
|---|---|---|---|---|---|
| | Rákoscsabai Főplébániatemplom (Rákoscsabai Nepomuki Szent János Főplébániatemplom, Ócsabai templom) | 1740 | baroque | n. a. | 1171 Budapest, Péceli út 229–231. |
| | Rákoskeresztúri Szent Kereszt felmagasztalása templom | 1894 | neo-baroque (?) | n. a. | 1173 Budapest, Pesti út 136. |
| | Rákosligeti Magyarok Nagyasszonya-templom | 1914–1915 | neogothic | Stanek Pál | 1172 Budapest, Hősök tere 1. |
| | Rákoshegyi Lisieux-i Szent Teréz templom | 1934–1937 | neo-baroque | n. a. | 1174 Budapest, Szent István tér 1. |
| | Rákoscsaba-Újtelepi Árpád-házi Szent Erzsébet-plébániatemplom | 1938–1939 | modern | Fábián Gáspár | 1171 Budapest, Árpád-házi Szent Erzsébet park |
| | Rákoskeresztúr-Madárdombi Szent Pál templom | 2000 | n. a. | Pap Károly | 1173 Budapest, Lázár deák u. 15–17. |
| | Rákoskerti Szent XXIII. János kápolna | 2016–2017 | n. a. | n. a. | 1171 Budapest, Zrínyi u. 269. |
| | Rákosszentmihályi Szent Imre-templom | n. a. | n. a. | n. a. | 1162 Budapest, Párta u. 32–34. |

=== Greek Catholic churches ===
| Picture | Name | Construction time | Architectural style | Designer | Address, comments |
|---|---|---|---|---|---|
| | Rákoskeresztúri Istenszülő Oltalma görögkatolikus templom | 1989–1990 | n. a. | n. a. | 1171 Budapest, Zrínyi u. 82. |

=== Reformed churches ===
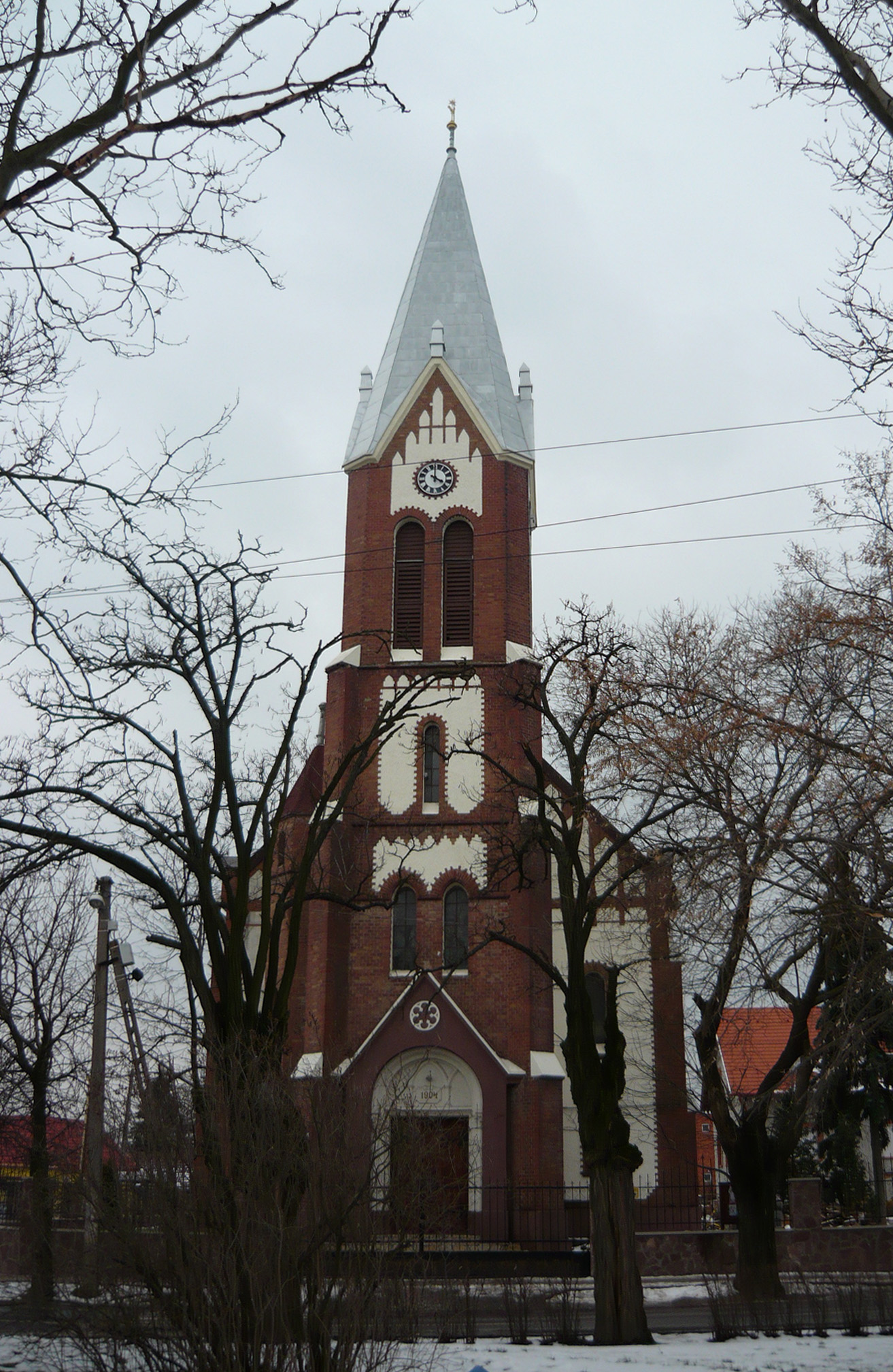
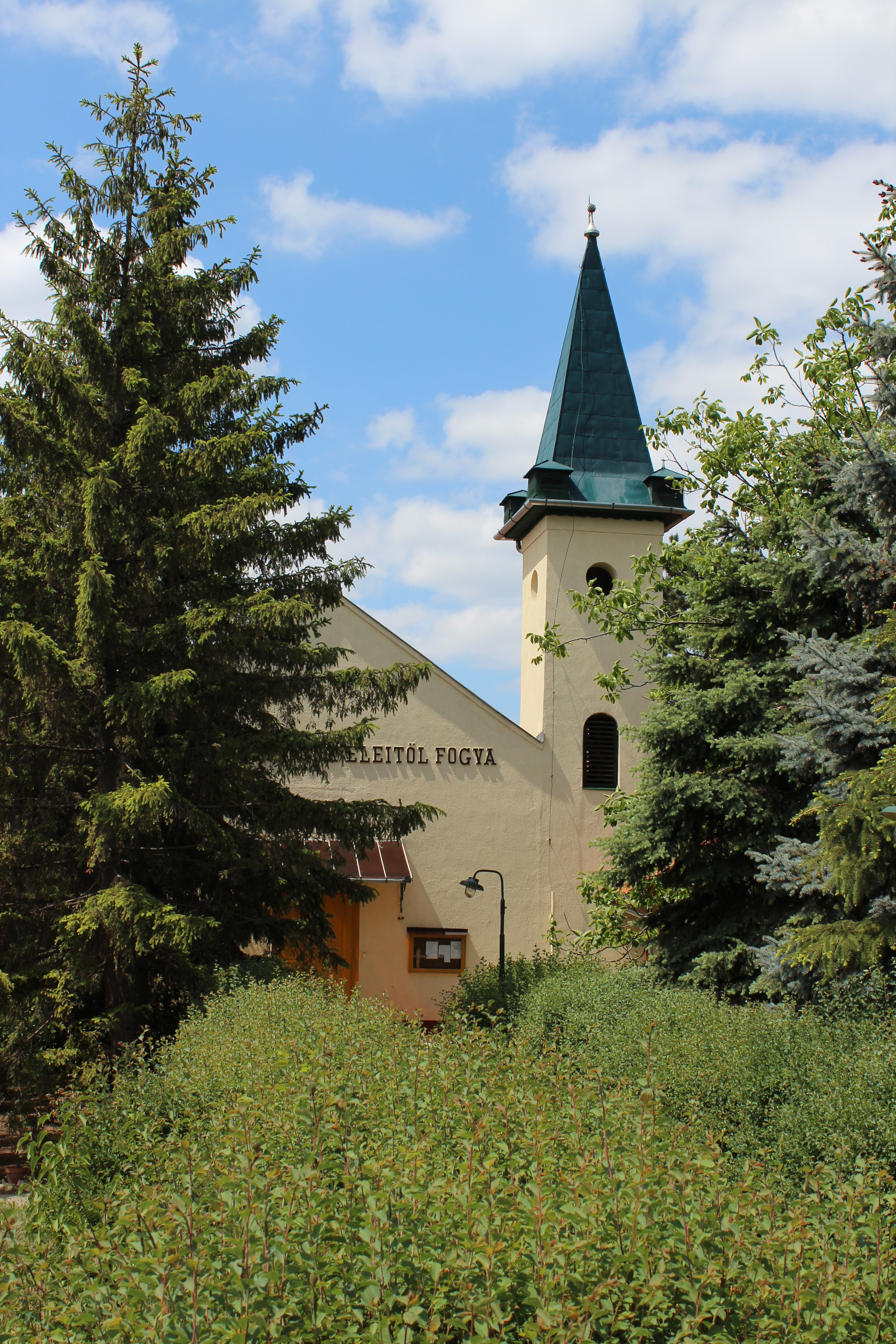
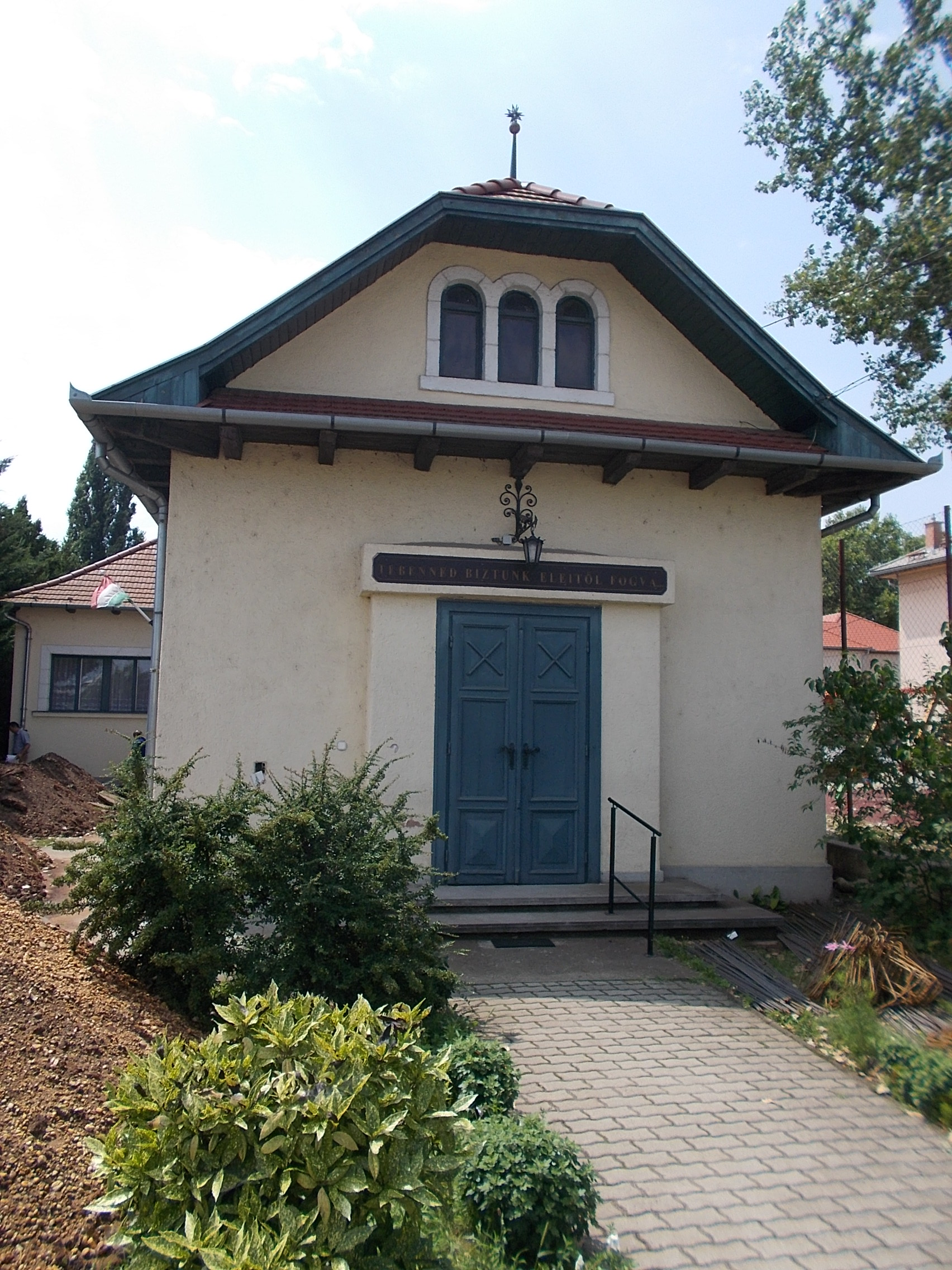
| Picture | Name | Construction time | Architectural style | Designer | Address, comments |
|---|---|---|---|---|---|
| | Rákoscsabai református templom | 1904–1905 | neogothic | n. a. | 1171 Budapest, Rákoscsaba u. 2. |
| | Rákoskeresztúri református templom | 1995–2000 | modern | Cseh József | 1173 Budapest, Pest út 31. |
| | Rákosligeti református templom | n. a. | n. a. | n. a. | 1172 Budapest, Ferihegyi út 21. |
| | Rákoshegyi református templom | n. a. | n. a. | n. a. | 1174 Budapest, Szabadság u. 26. |

=== Evangelical churches ===
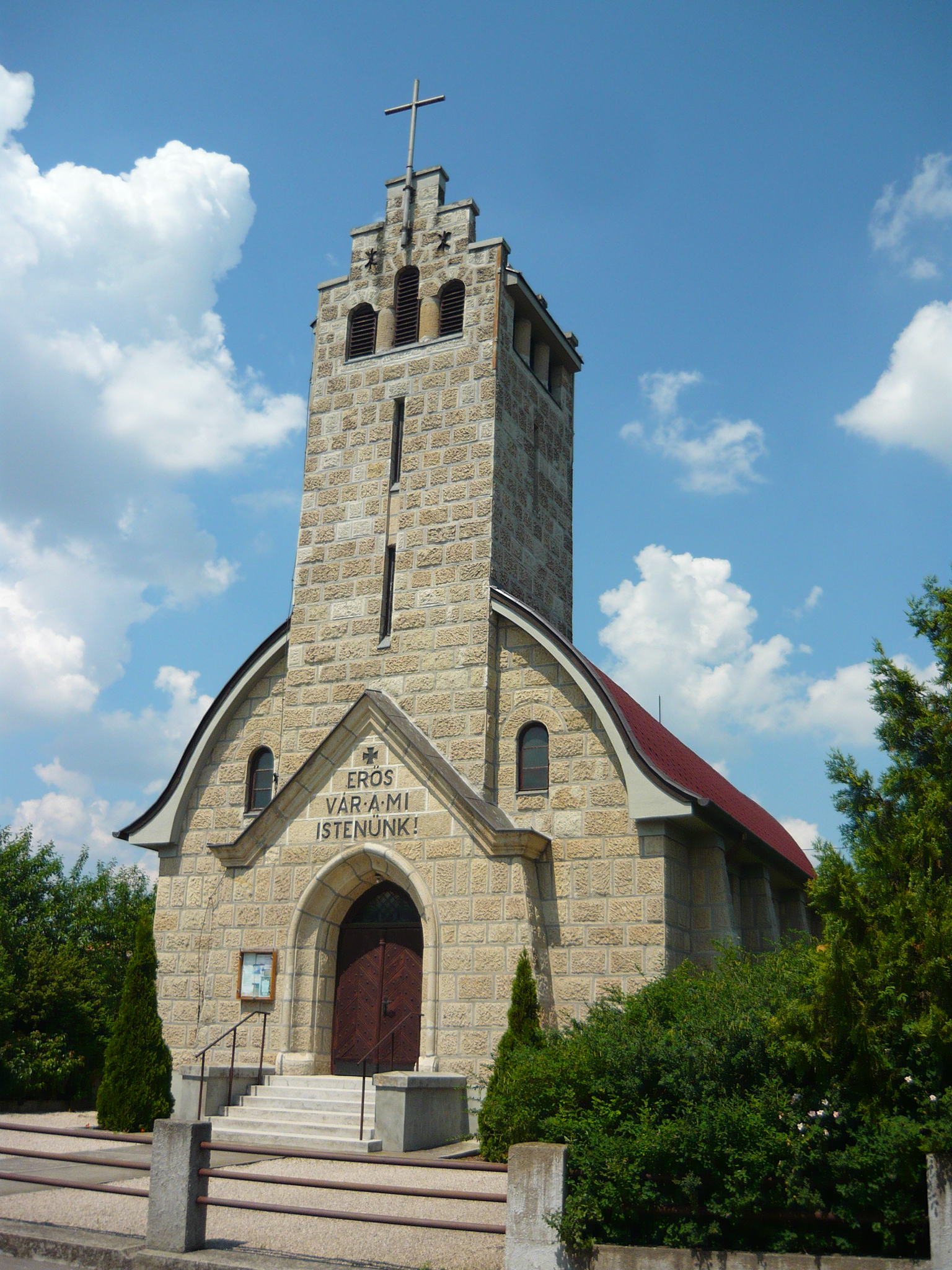
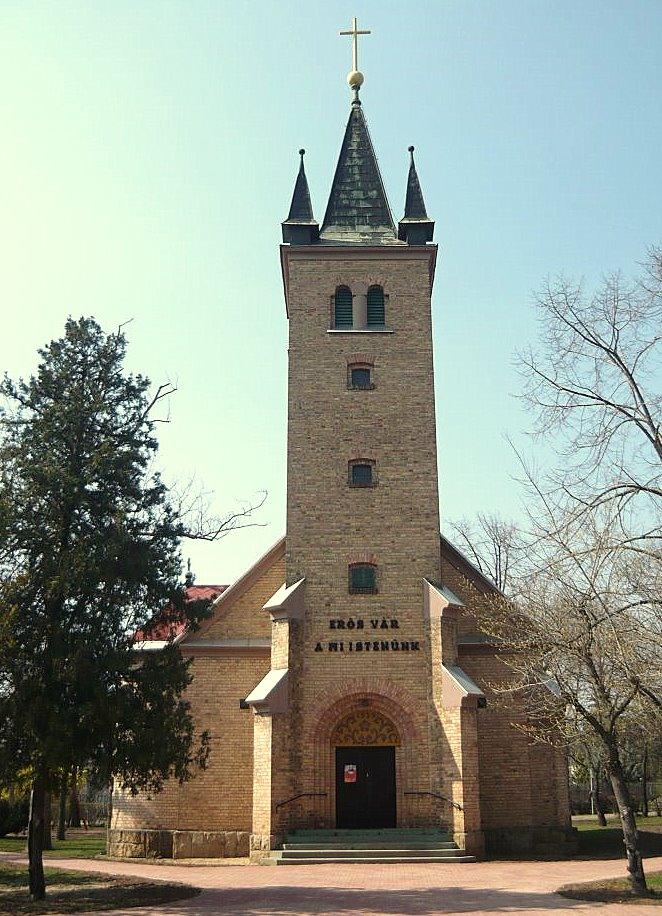
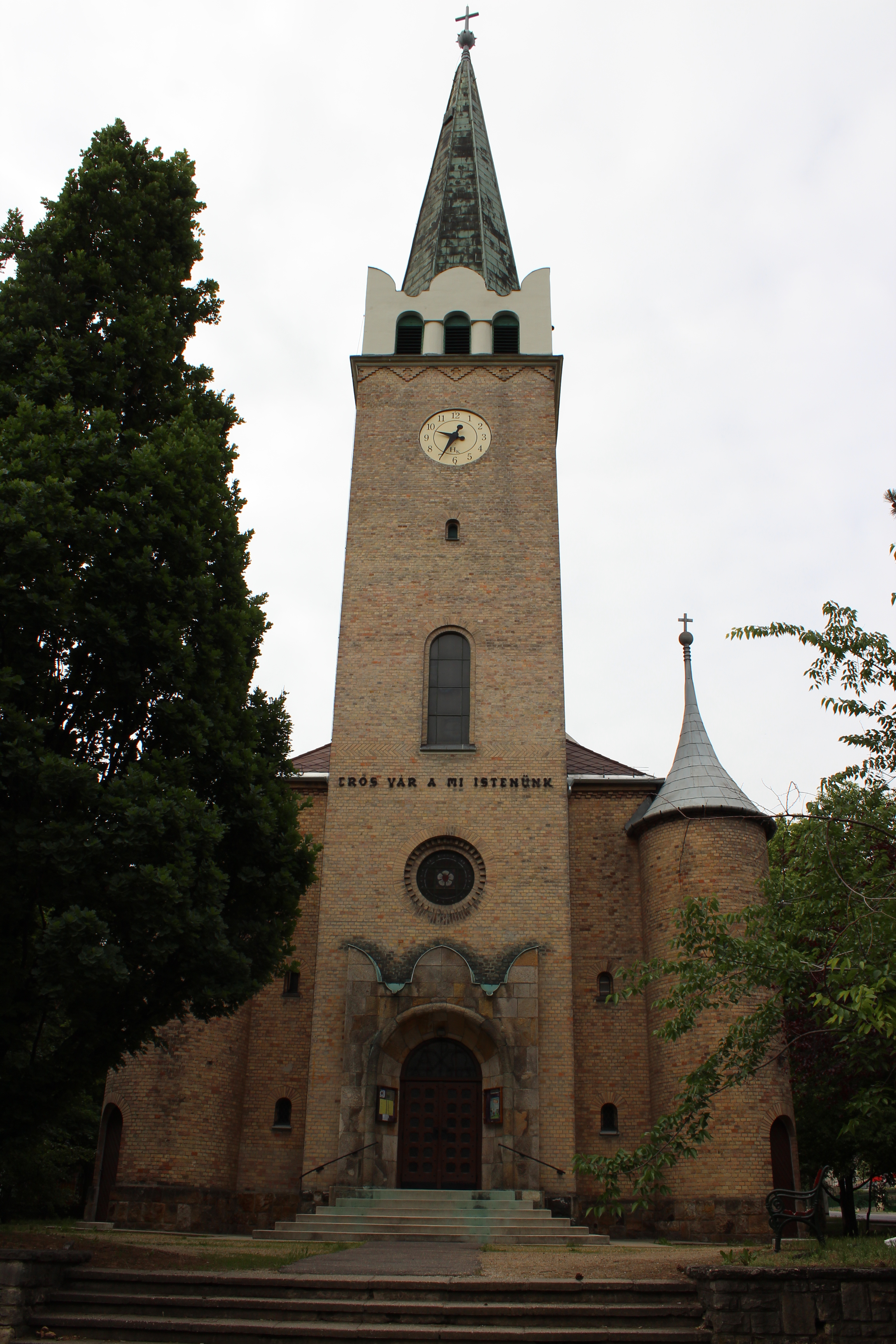
| Picture | Name | Construction time | Architectural style | Designer | Address, comments |
|---|---|---|---|---|---|
| | Rákosligeti evangélikus templom | 1932 | neo-romanesque (?) | Gyula Sándy | 1172 Budapest, XIX. u. 15. |
| | Rákoshegyi evangélikus templom | 1938–1939 | neo-romanesque (?) | Gyula Sándy | 1174 Budapest, Tessedik tér 1. |
| | Rákoscsabai evangélikus templom | 1939 | neo-romanesque (?) | Gyula Sándy | 1171 Budapest, Péceli út 146. |
| | Rákoskeresztúri evangélikus templom | 1943 | neo-romanesque (?) | Gyula Sándy | 1173 Budapest, Pesti út 111. |

=== Other churches ===
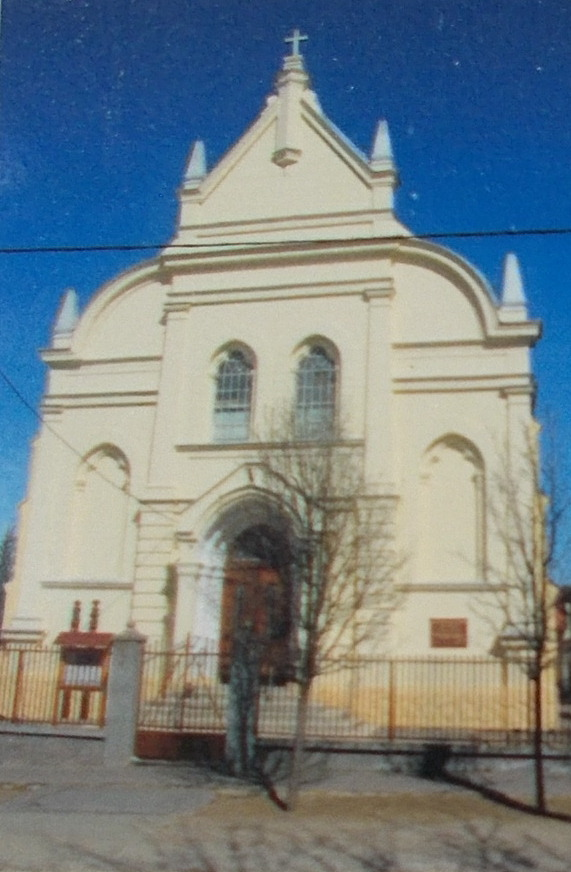
| Picture | Name | Construction time | Architectural style | Designer | Address, comments |
|---|---|---|---|---|---|
| | Rákoscsabai baptista imaház | 1901 | eclectic (?) | Kovács Sándor | 1171 Budapest, Zrínyi u. 38. |
| | Rákoshegyi baptista templom | 1920-as évek | Art Déco (?) | n. a. | 1174 Budapest, Podmaniczky Zsuzsanna u. 6. Originally built as a synagogue, it was converted in 1989 into a Baptist church. |
| | Kereszt Úr baptista imaház | n. a. | n. a. | n. a. | 1173 Budapest, Csabai út 20. |
| | Rákoscsabai adventista imaház | n. a. | n. a. | n. a. | 1171 Budapest, Borsfa u. 55. |

== District XVIII ==
=== Roman Catholic churches ===
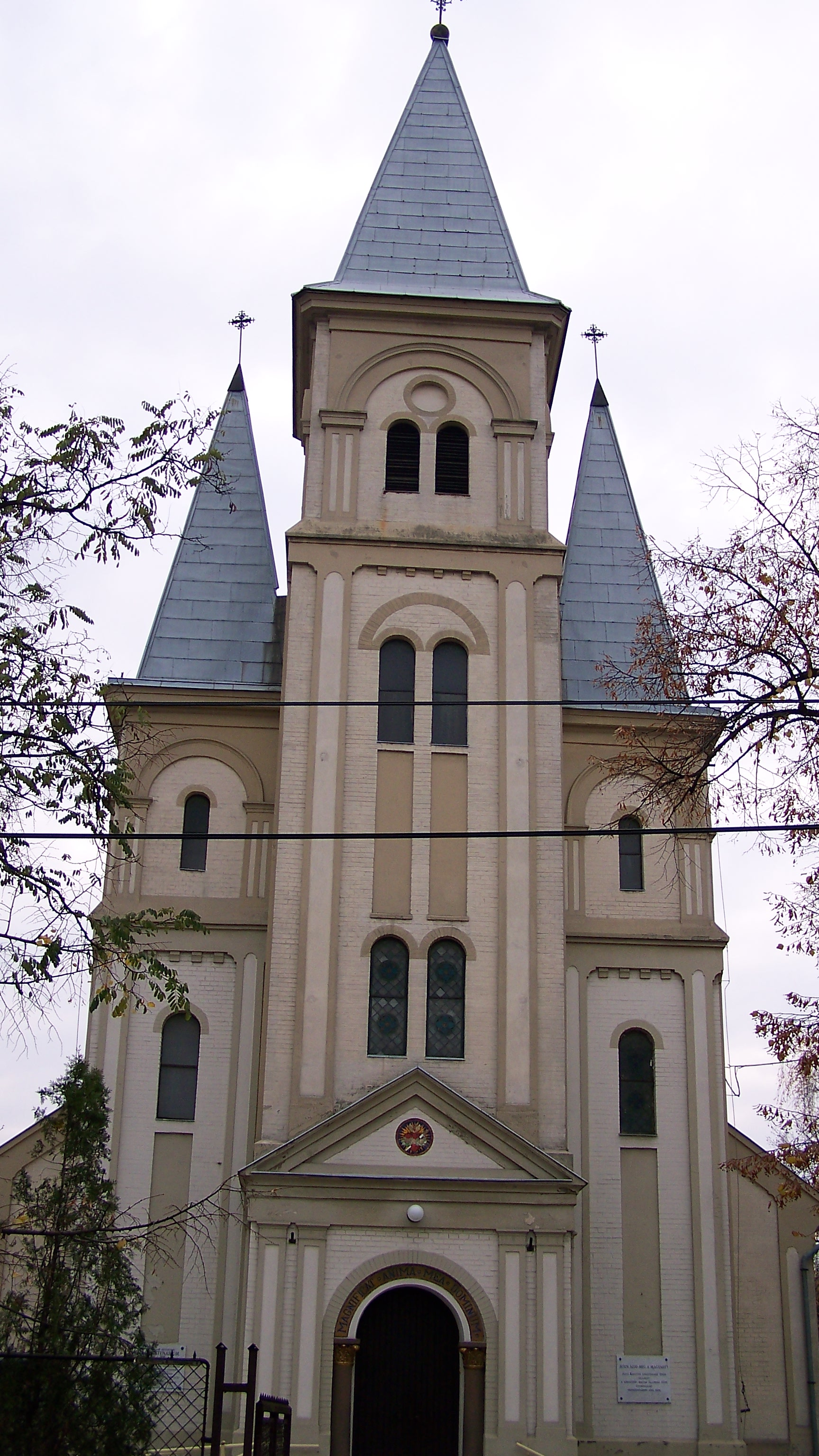
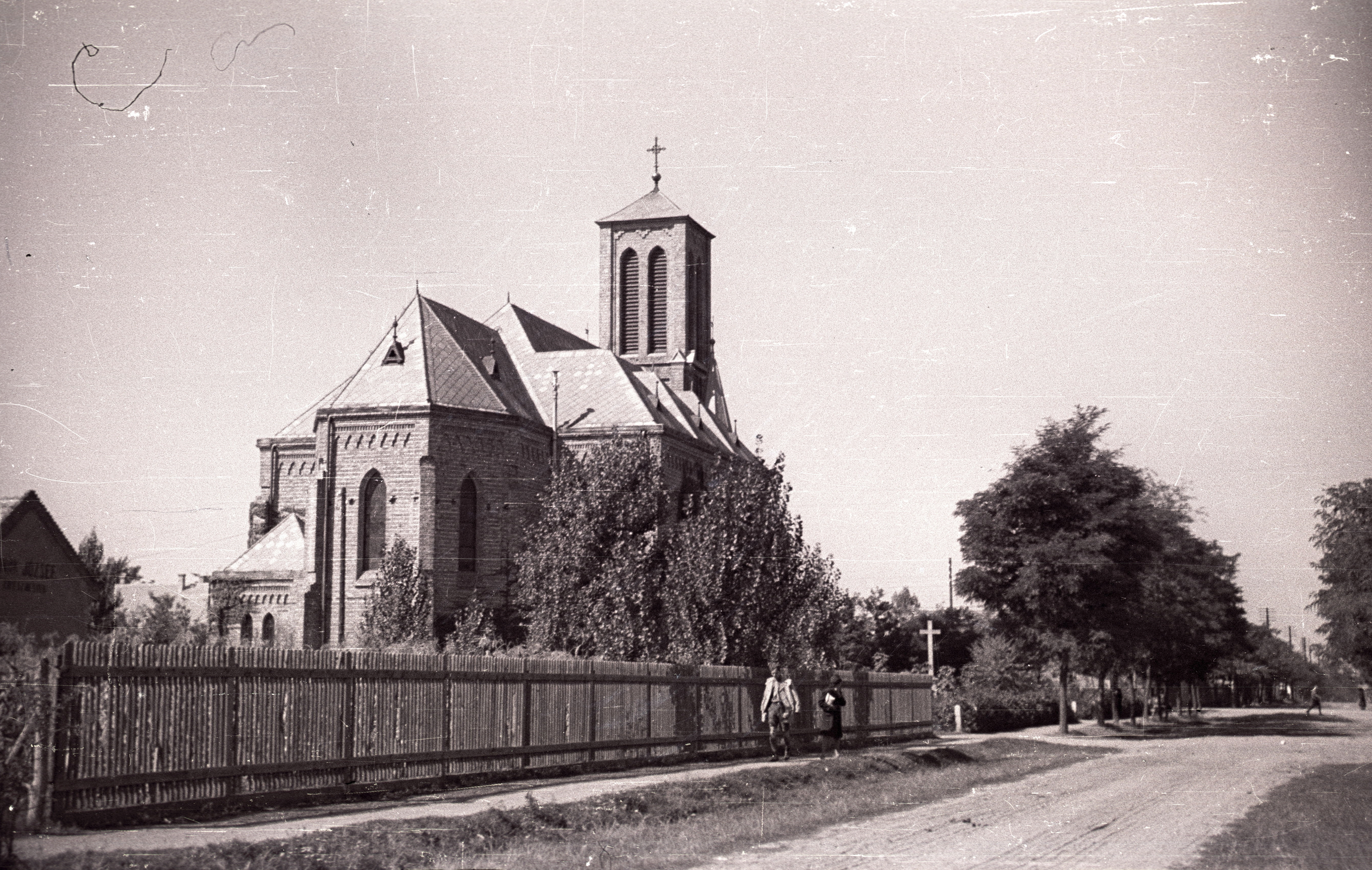
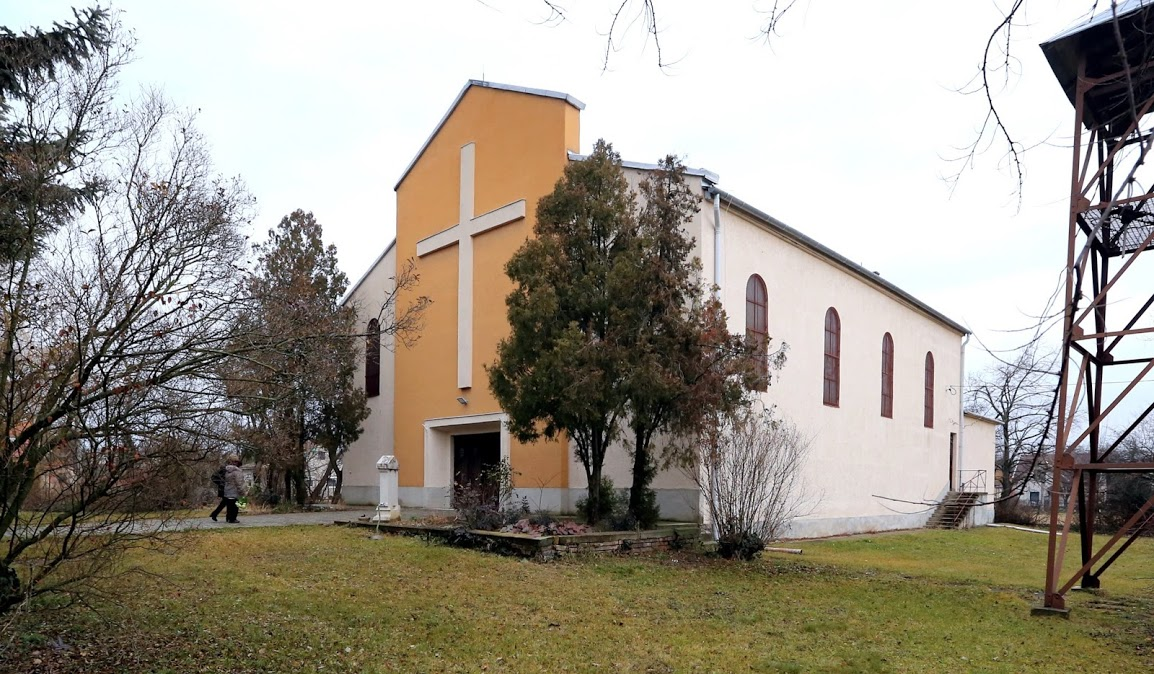
| Picture | Name | Construction time | Architectural style | Designer | Address, comments |
|---|---|---|---|---|---|
| | Pestszentlőrinci Grassalkovich-kápolna | 1762 | n. a. | n. a. | 1181 Budapest, Margó Tivadar u. |
| | Pestszentlőrinci Főtemplom | 1923–1925 | neo-classicist (?) | n. a. | 1181 Budapest, Batthyány Lajos u. 87/B. |
| | Pestszentlőrinc–Havannatelepi Szent László plébániatemplom | 1934–1935 | neo-baroque (?) | n. a. | 1181 Budapest, Kondor Béla sétány 6. |
| | Pestszentlőrinc–Szemeretelepi Szent István király templom | 1937–1938 | modern | n. a. | 1185 Budapest, Tátrafüred tér 15. |
| | Pestszentimrei Szent Imre-templom | 1939 | neogothic | n. a. | 1188 Budapest, Nemes u. 17. |
| | Pestszentlőrinci Szent Erzsébet-templom | 1941–1963 | n. a. | n. a. | 1183 Budapest, Attila u. 53. |
| | Pestszentlőrinc–Csákyligeti Szent József templom | 1966 | n. a. | n. a. | 1185 Budapest, Barcika tér 7. |
| | Pestszentlőrinc–Miklóstelepi Szent József templom | 1970 előtt | n. a. | n. a. | 1183 Budapest, Ibolya u. 1. A residential house was converted into a church. |
| | Pestszentlőrinci Árpád-házi Szent Margit templom | 1996 | n. a. | n. a. | 1182 Budapest, Fogaras u. 16. |

=== Reformed churches ===
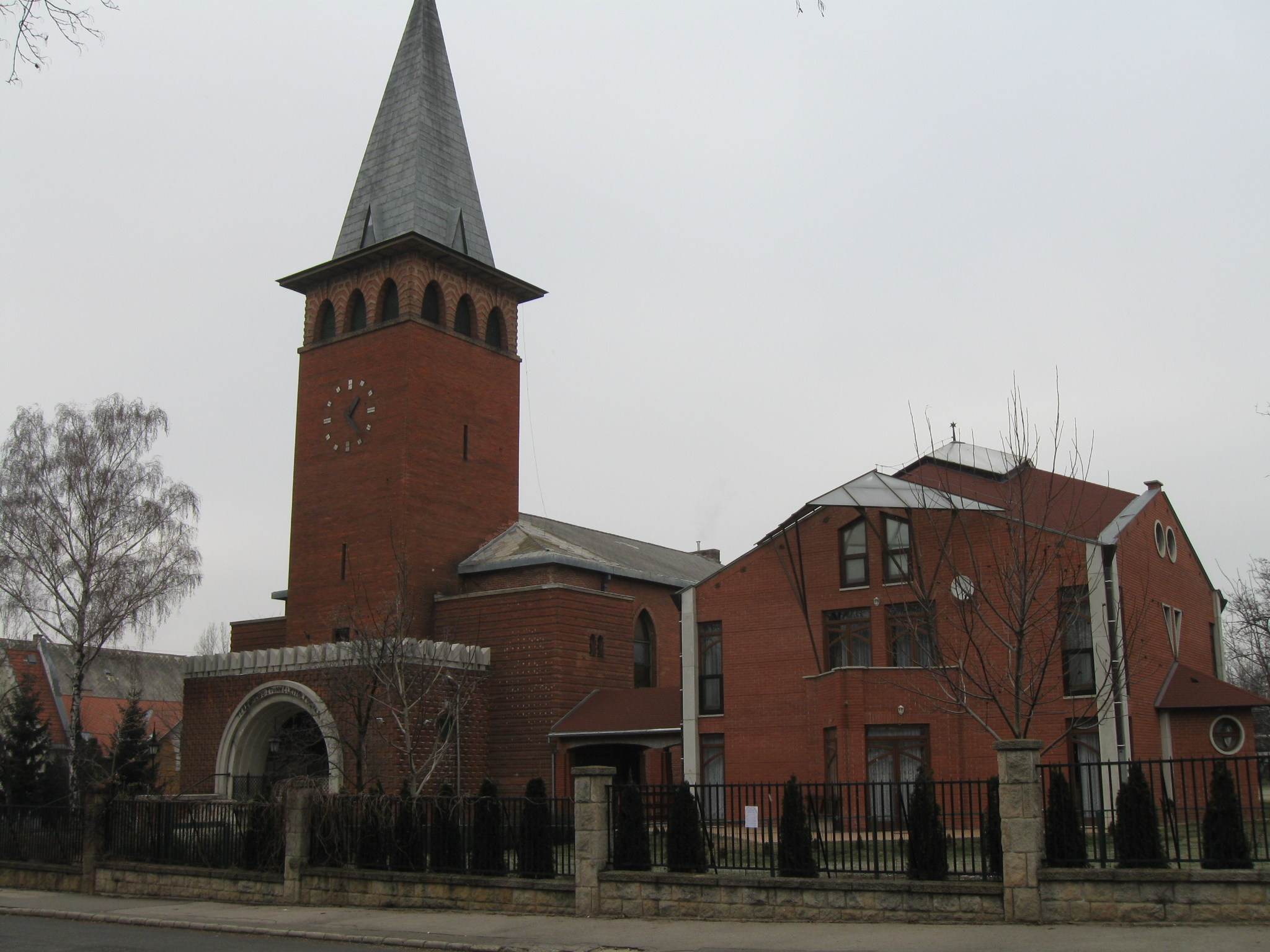
| Picture | Name | Construction time | Architectural style | Designer | Address, comments |
|---|---|---|---|---|---|
| | Pestszentlőrinc–Kossuth téri református templom | 1932–1941 | neo-renaissance | n. a. | 1183 Budapest, Kossuth Lajos tér 5. |
| | Pestszentlőrinc–Ganzkertvárosi református templom | 1933 | Hungarian folk (?) | n. a. | 1185 Budapest, Marczali tér |
| | Pestszentlőrinc–Erzsébet–Bélatelepi református templom | 1942 | modern | n. a. | 1183 Budapest, Felsőcsatári út 31. |
| | Pestszentimrei református templom | before 2001 | Hungarian folk (?) | n. a. | 1188 Budapest, Rákóczi u. 31. |
| | Pestszentlőrinc–Szemeretelepi református templom | 2010–2013 | modern | Nagy Béla | 1185 Budapest, Bajcsy-Zsilinszky út 39/a. |

=== Evangelical churches ===
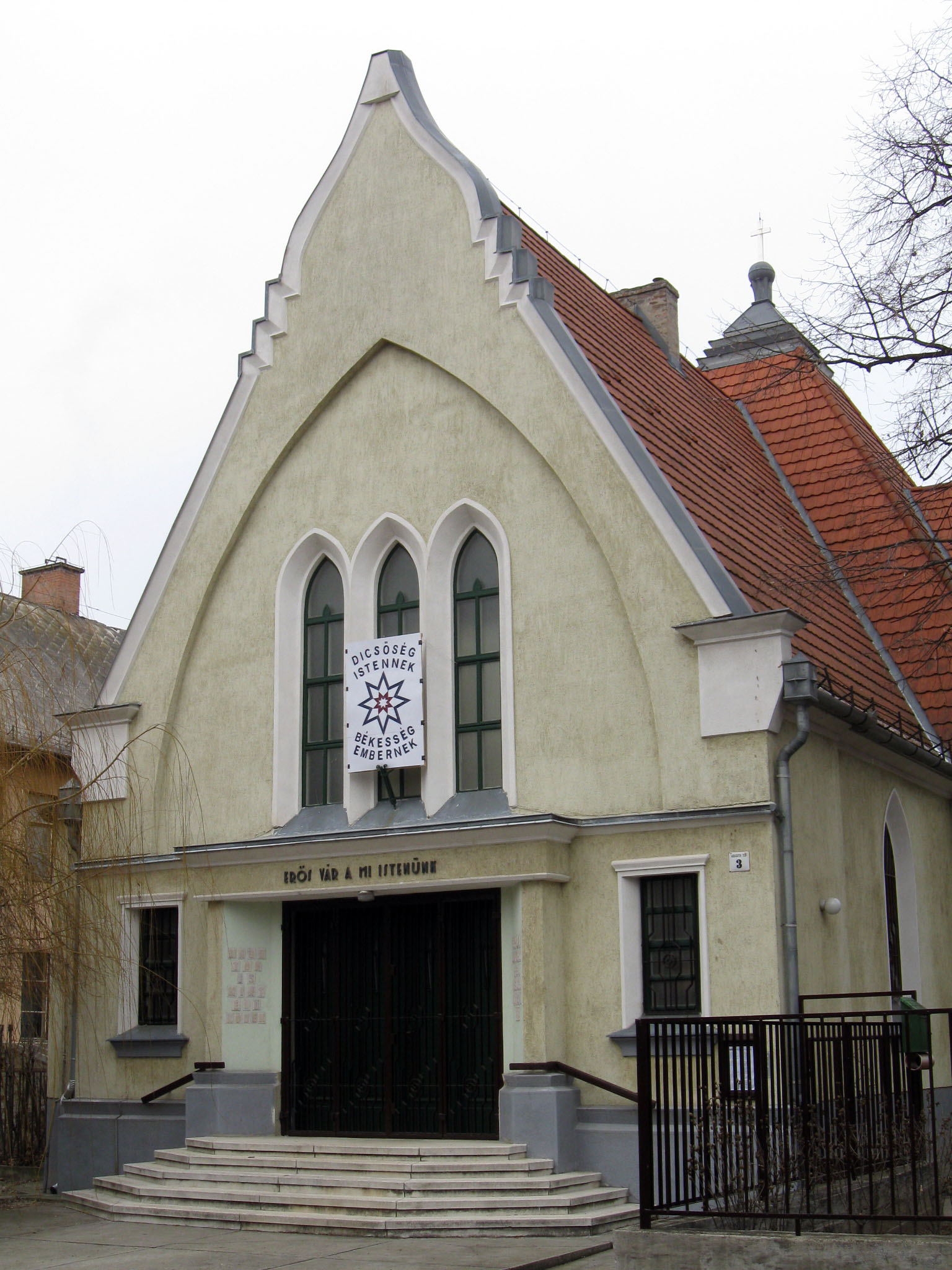
| Picture | Name | Construction time | Architectural style | Designer | Address, comments |
|---|---|---|---|---|---|
| | Pestszentlőrinci evangélikus templom | 1932 | n. a. | n. a. | 1183 Budapest, Kossuth Lajos tér 3. |
| | Pestszentimrei Luther-kápolna | 2016–2017 | n. a. | n. a. | 1188 Budapest, Nemes u. 62. |

=== Unitarian churches ===
| Picture | Name | Construction time | Architectural style | Designer | Address, comments |
|---|---|---|---|---|---|
| | Pestszentlőrinci unitárius templom | 1935–1936 | Hungarian folk (?) | n. a. | 1181 Budapest, Szervét Mihály tér 1. |

=== Other churches ===
| Picture | Name | Construction time | Architectural style | Designer | Address, comments |
|---|---|---|---|---|---|
| | Pestszentlőrinci baptista imaház | 1977 | n. a. | n. a. | 1182 Budapest, Sallai Imre u. 132. |
| | Szűz Mária és Szent Mihály arkangyal kopt ortodox templom | 2011 | n. a. | n. a. | 1185 Budapest, Selmecbánya u. 68. It was a Reformed church that was rebuilt in 2011. |
| | Dona Nobis Pacem Ökumenikus kápolna | 2013 | n. a. | n. a. | 1185 Budapest, Ferihegy 2/B terminál. It operates at Liszt Ferenc Airport. |
| | Pestszentimrei baptista imaház | n. a. | n. a. | n. a. | 1188 Budapest, Nemes u. 28. |
| | Pestszentlőrinci adventista imaház | n. a. | n. a. | n. a. | 1182 Budapest, Petőfi u. 22. |
| | Pestszentlőrinci Keresztény Advent imaház | n. a. | n. a. | n. a. | 1184 Budapest, Reviczky Gyula u. 46. |

== District XIX ==
=== Roman Catholic churches ===
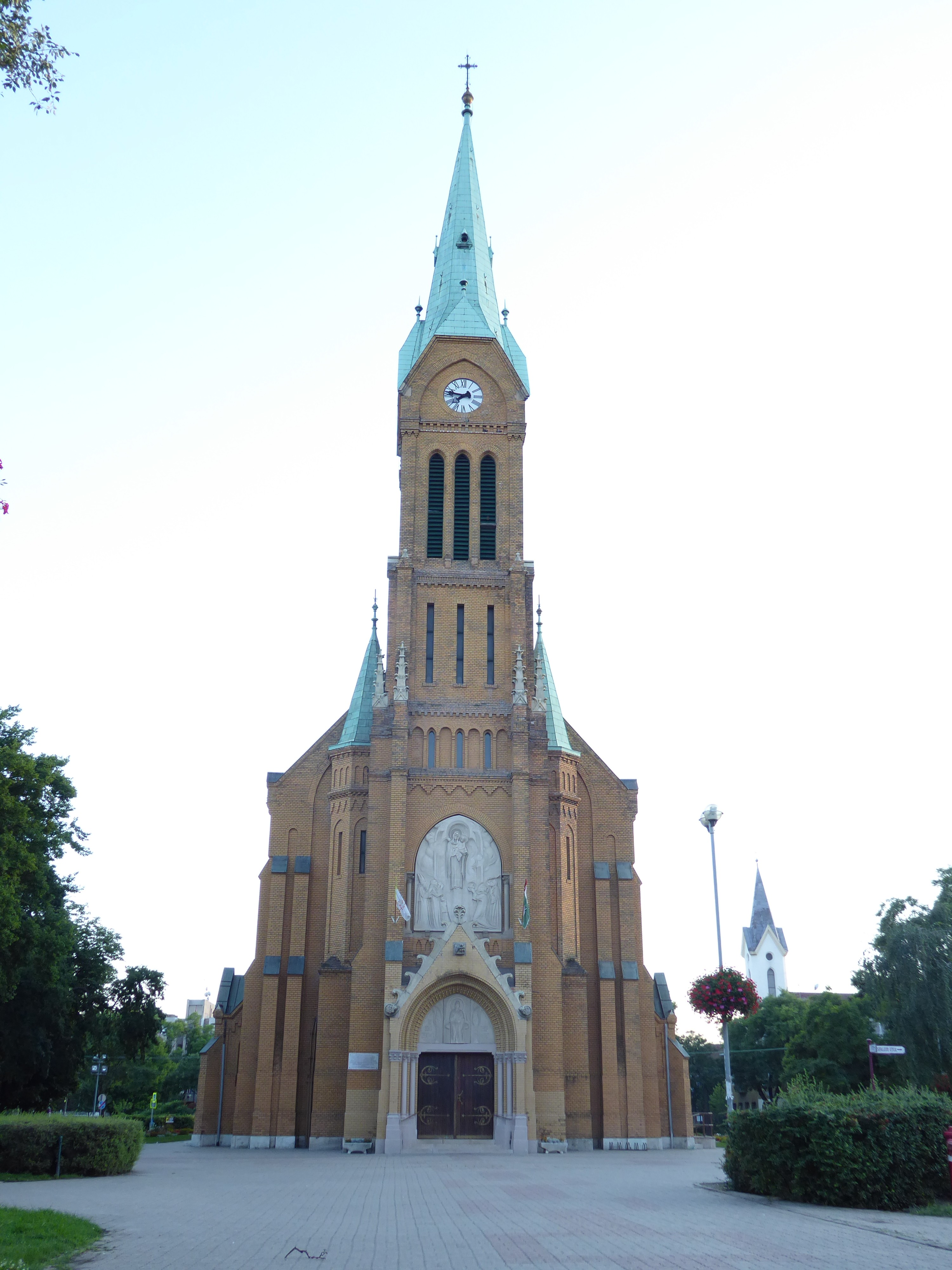
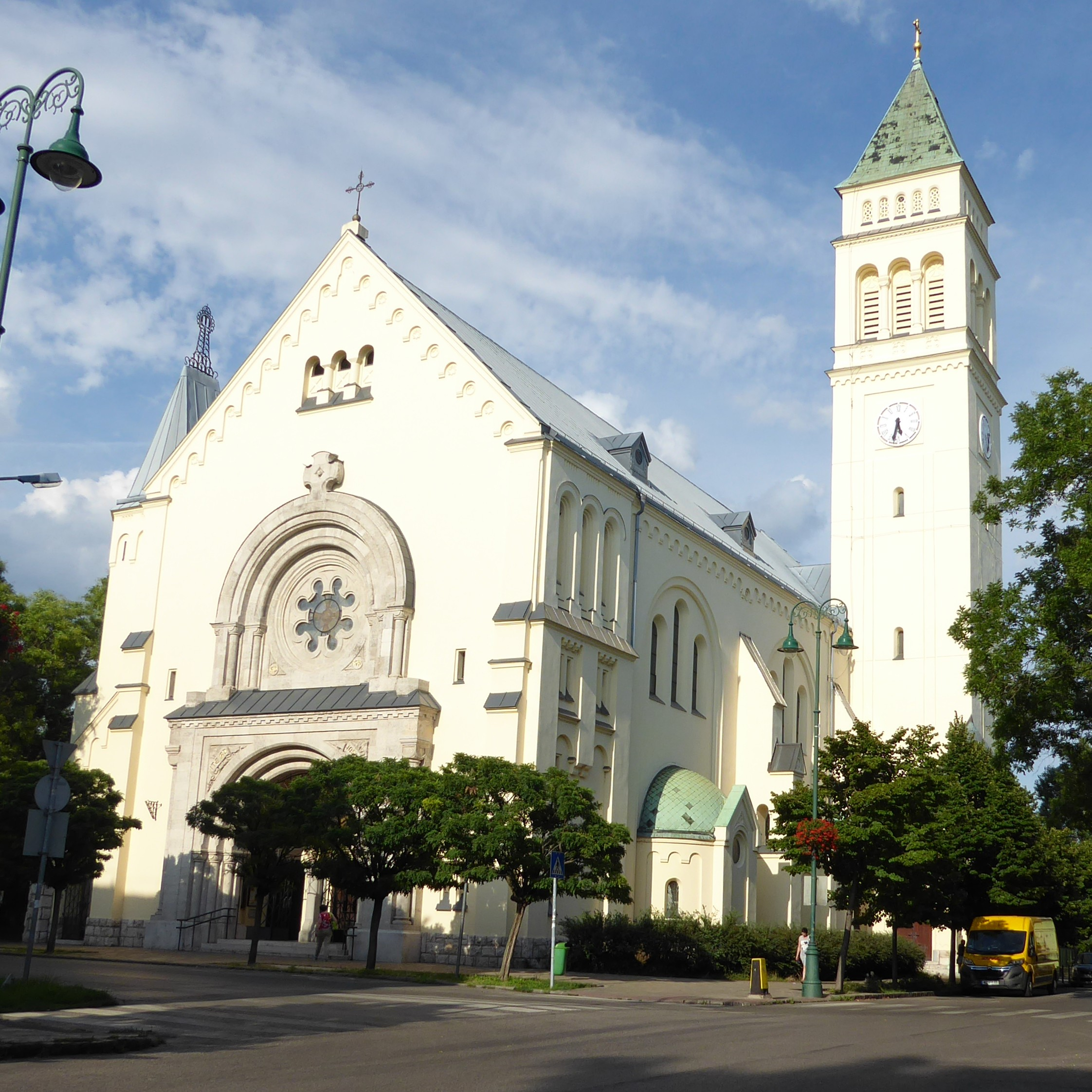
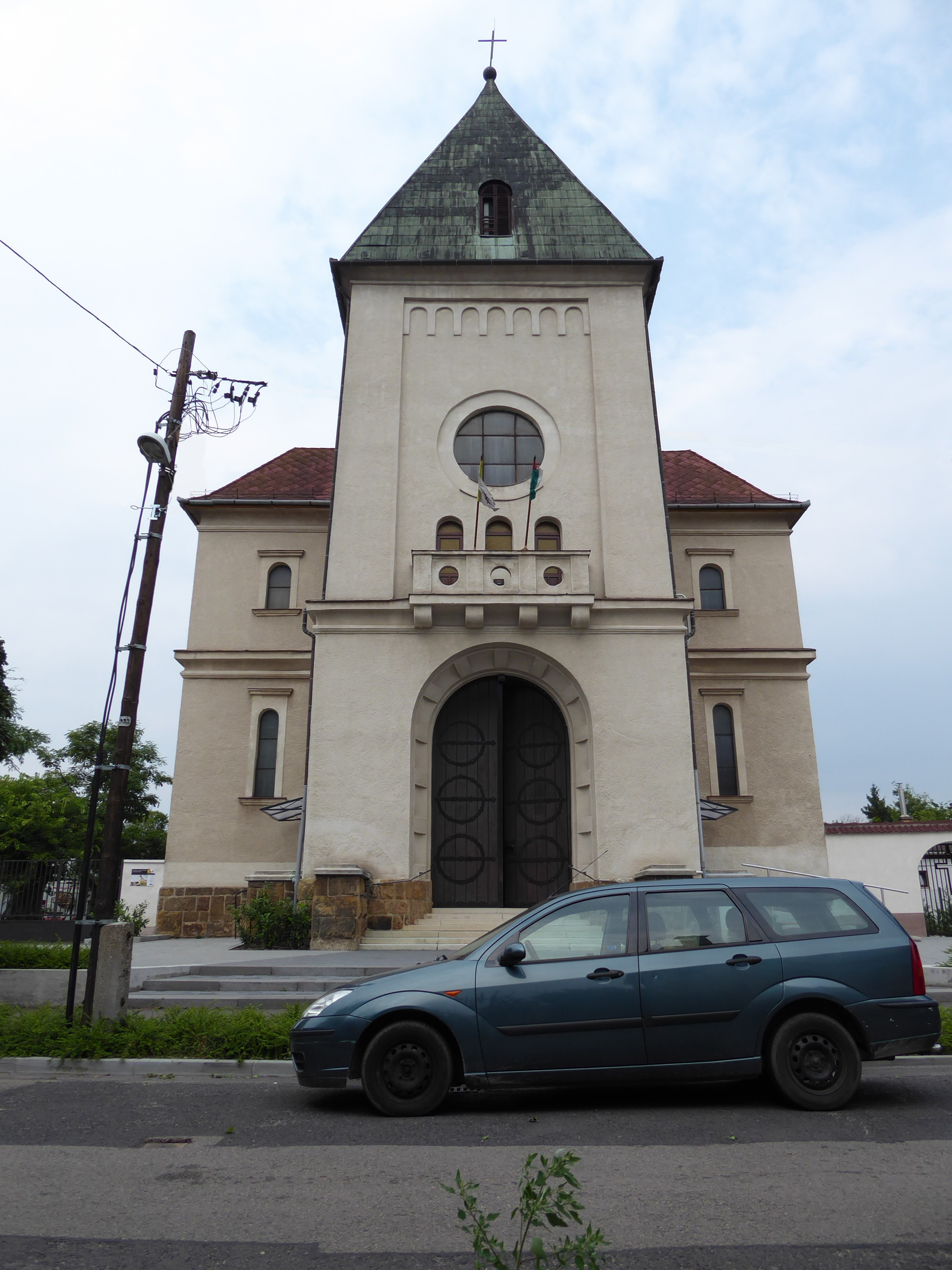
| Picture | Name | Construction time | Architectural style | Designer | Address, comments |
|---|---|---|---|---|---|
| | Kispesti Nagyboldogasszony-templom | 1903–1904 | neogothic | Hofhauser Antal | 1191 Budapest, Templom tér 21. |
| | Wekerlei Munkás Szent József-templom | 1926–1930 | neo-romanesque | Heintz Béla | 1192 Budapest, Kós Károly tér 16. |
| | Kispesti Jézus Szíve templom | 1929–1939 | neo-romanesque (?) | n. a. | 1196 Budapest, Áchim András u. 78. |

=== Greek Catholic churches ===
| Picture | Name | Construction time | Architectural style | Designer | Address, comments |
|---|---|---|---|---|---|
| | Kispesti Aranyszájú Szent János görögkatolikus templom | 1948 | n. a. | n. a. | 1195 Budapest, Kossuth Lajos u. 10/A. |

=== Reformed churches ===
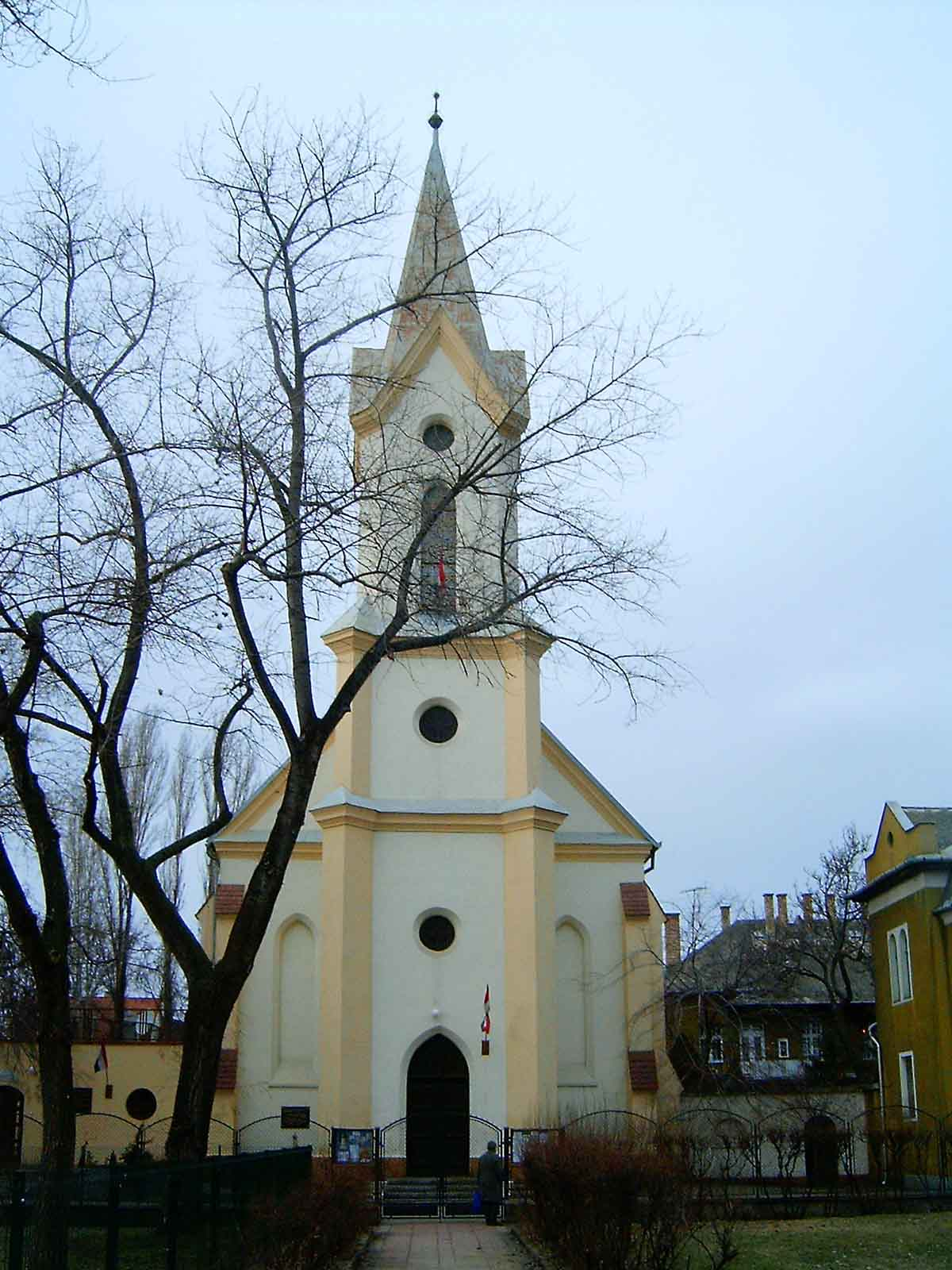
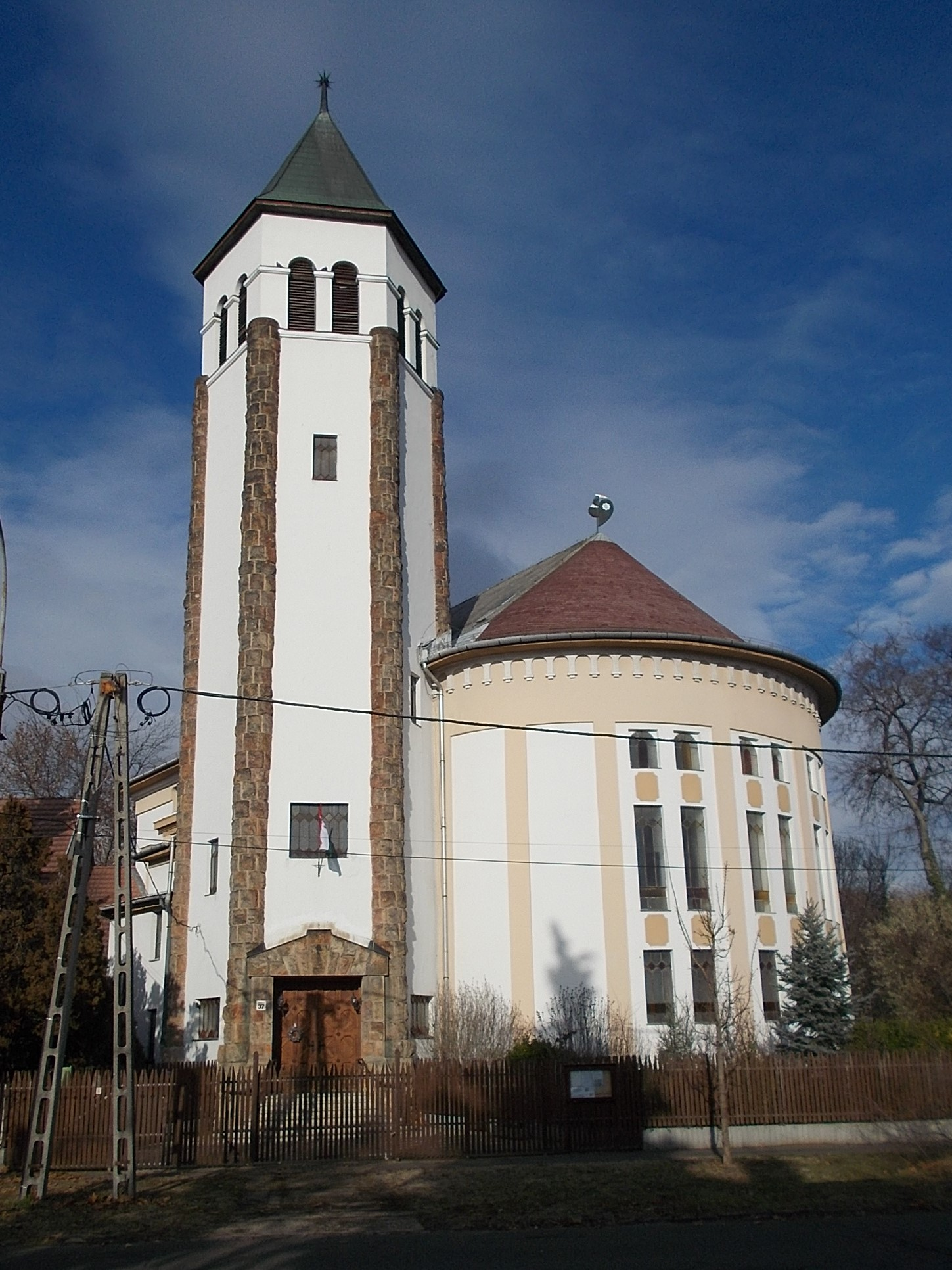
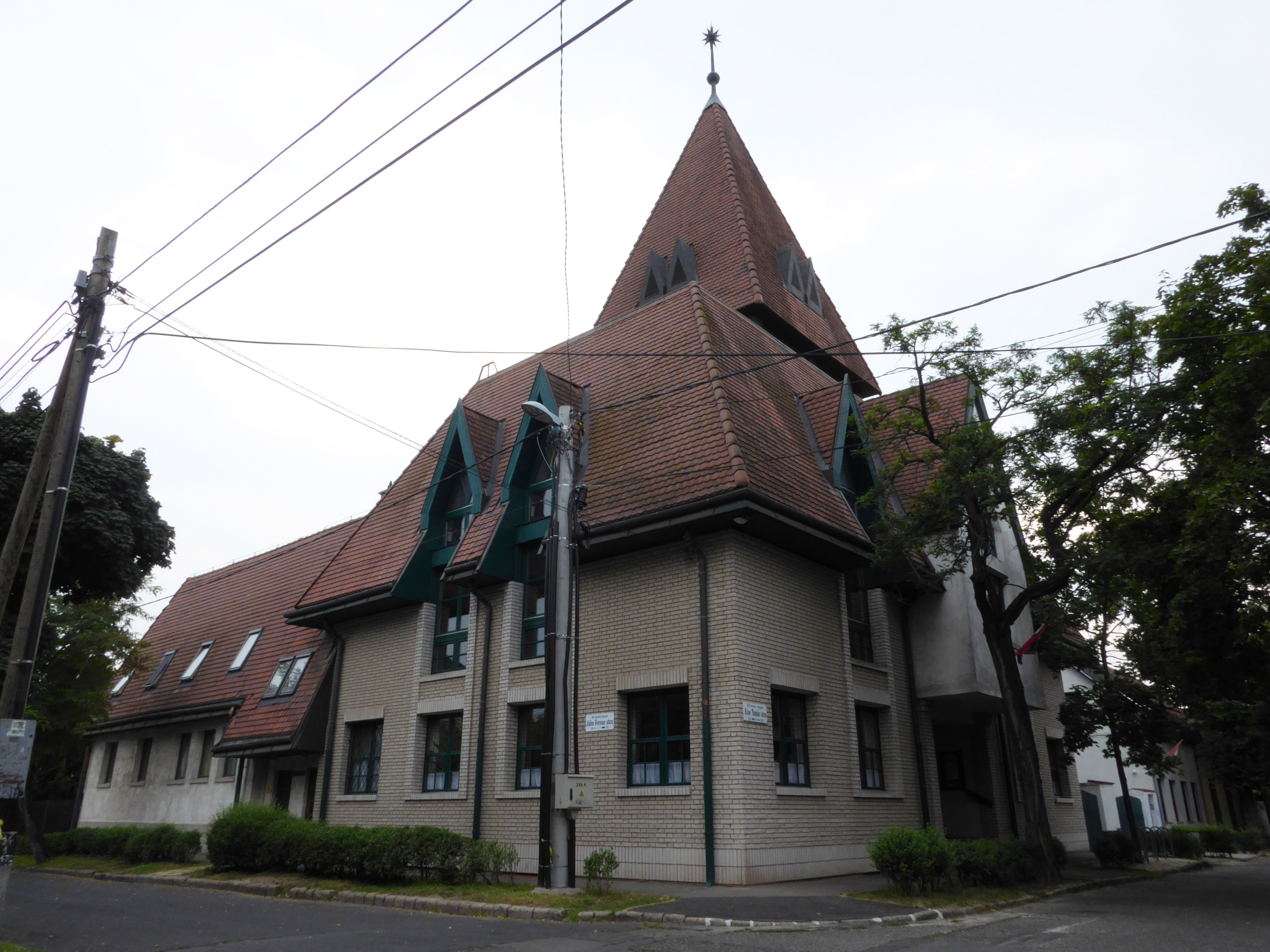
| Picture | Name | Construction time | Architectural style | Designer | Address, comments |
|---|---|---|---|---|---|
| | Kispesti központi református templom | 1896–1898 | neogothic (?) | n. a. | 1196 Budapest, Templom tér 19. |
| | Kispest-Wekerletelepi református templom | 1928 | Hungarian folk | n. a. | 1192 Budapest, Hungária út 37. |
| | Rózsatéri református templom | 1947 | Hungarian folk (?) | n. a. | 1196 Budapest, Jáhn Ferenc u. 107. The building was converted into a church in 1947. |

=== Evangelical churchesk ===
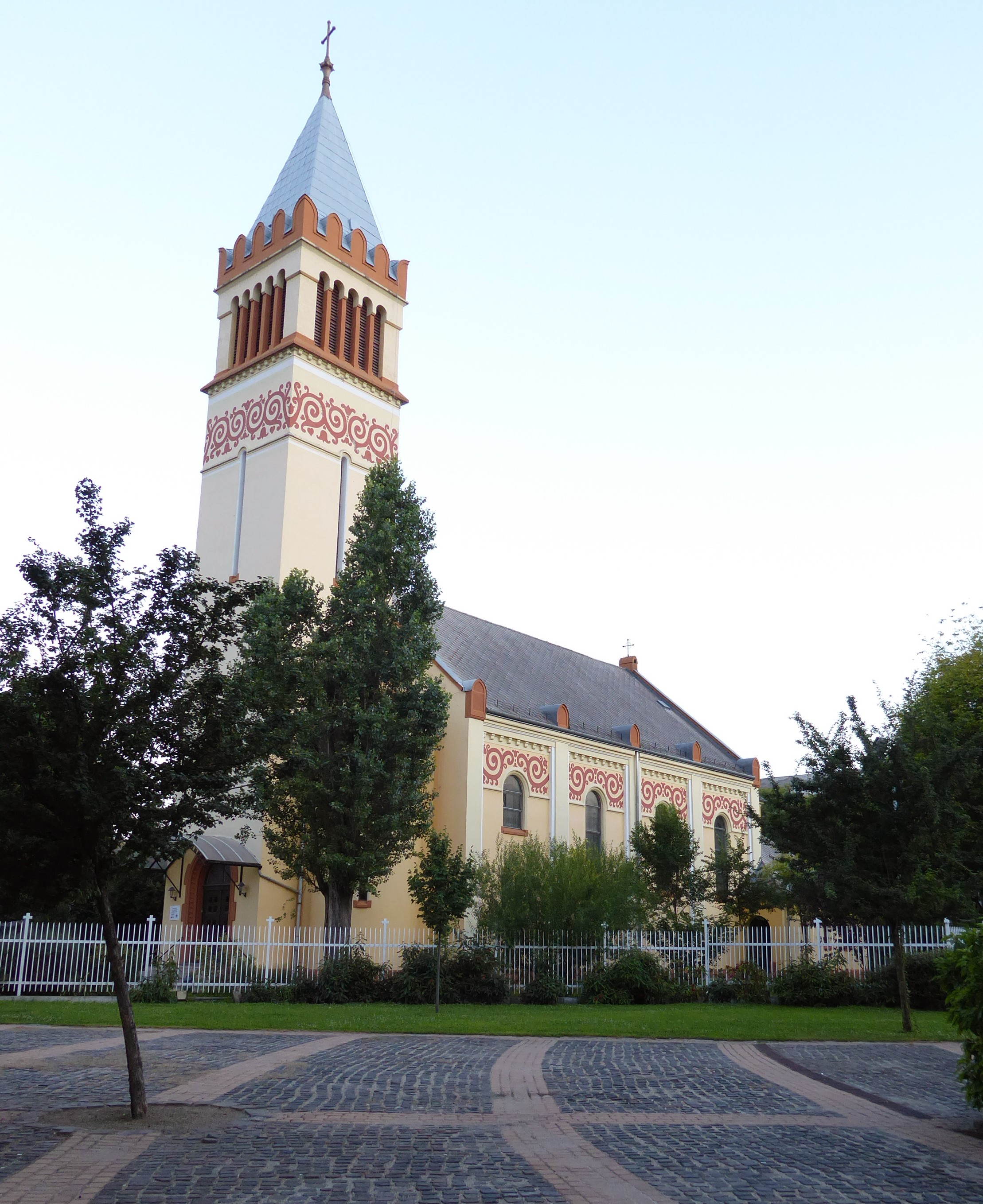
| Picture | Name | Construction time | Architectural style | Designer | Address, comments |
|---|---|---|---|---|---|
| | Kispesti evangélikus templom | 1924–1927 | Art Nouveau (?) | Gyula Sándy | 1196 Budapest, Templom tér 1. |

=== Other churches ===
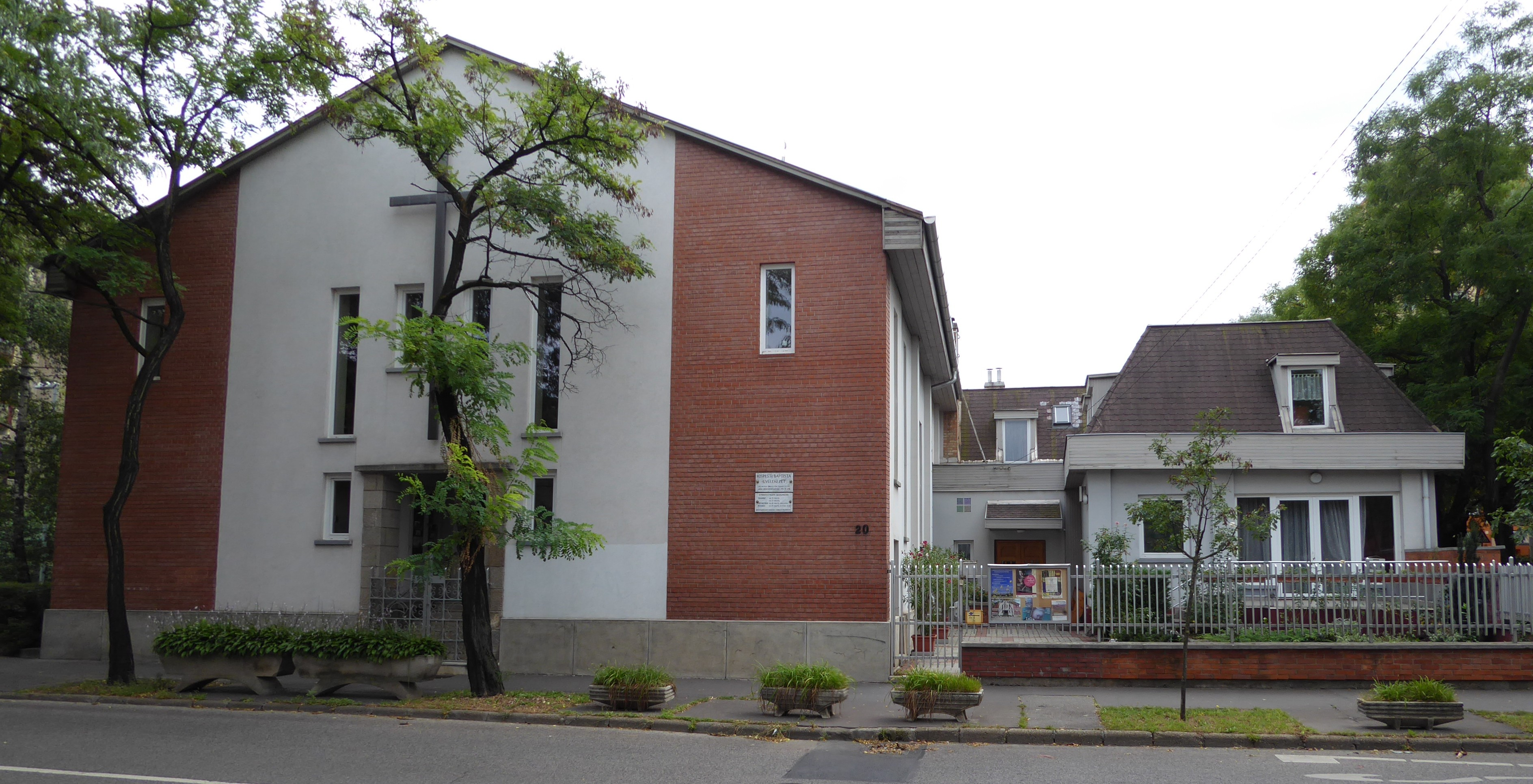
| Picture | Name | Construction time | Architectural style | Designer | Address, comments |
|---|---|---|---|---|---|
| | Kispesti baptista imaház | n. a. | n. a. | n. a. | 1191 Budapest, Kisfaludy utca 20. |
| | Méltóság Napja Templom | n. a. | n. a. | n. a. | 1196 Budapest, Fő út 110. |

== District XX ==
=== Roman Catholic churches ===
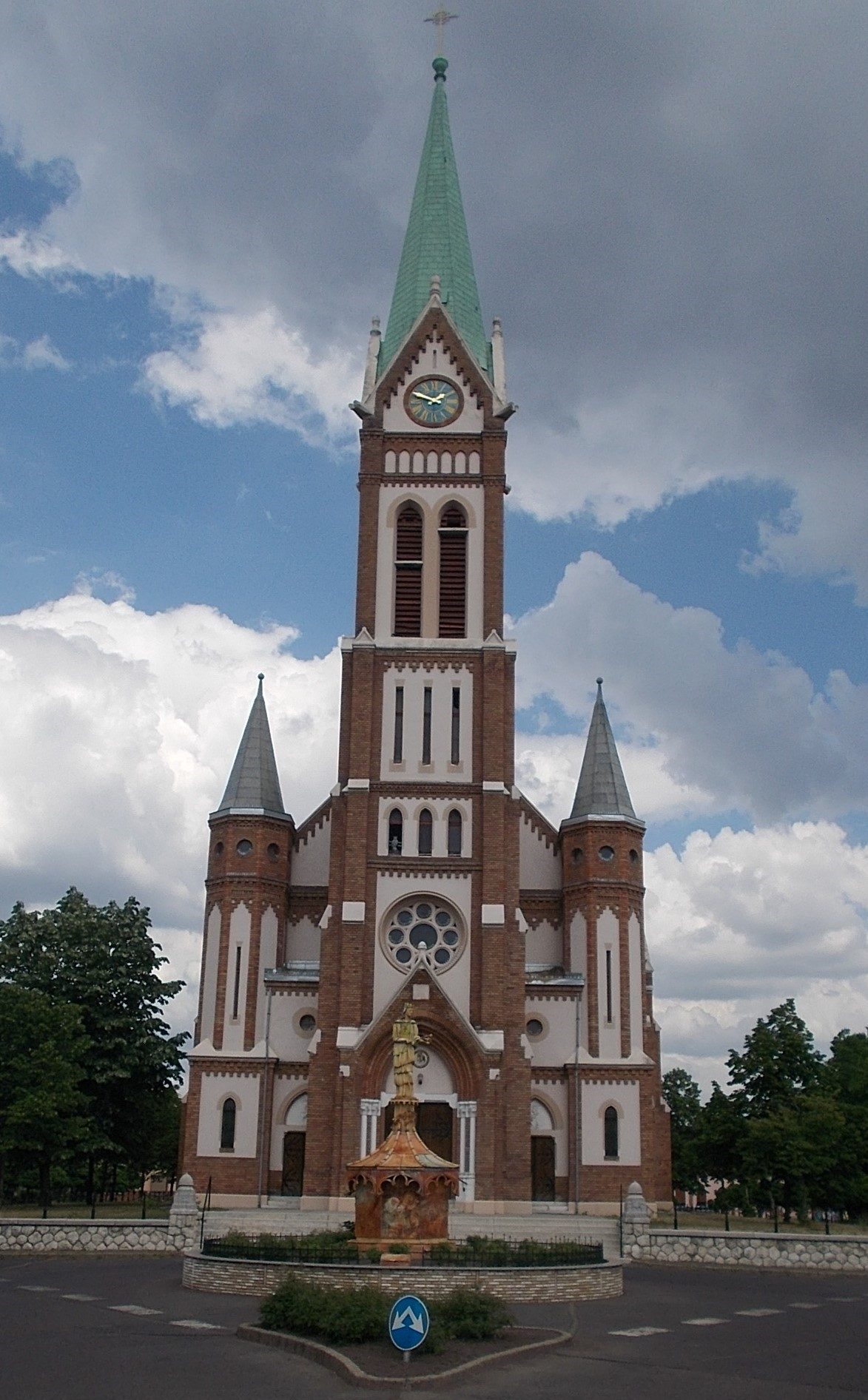
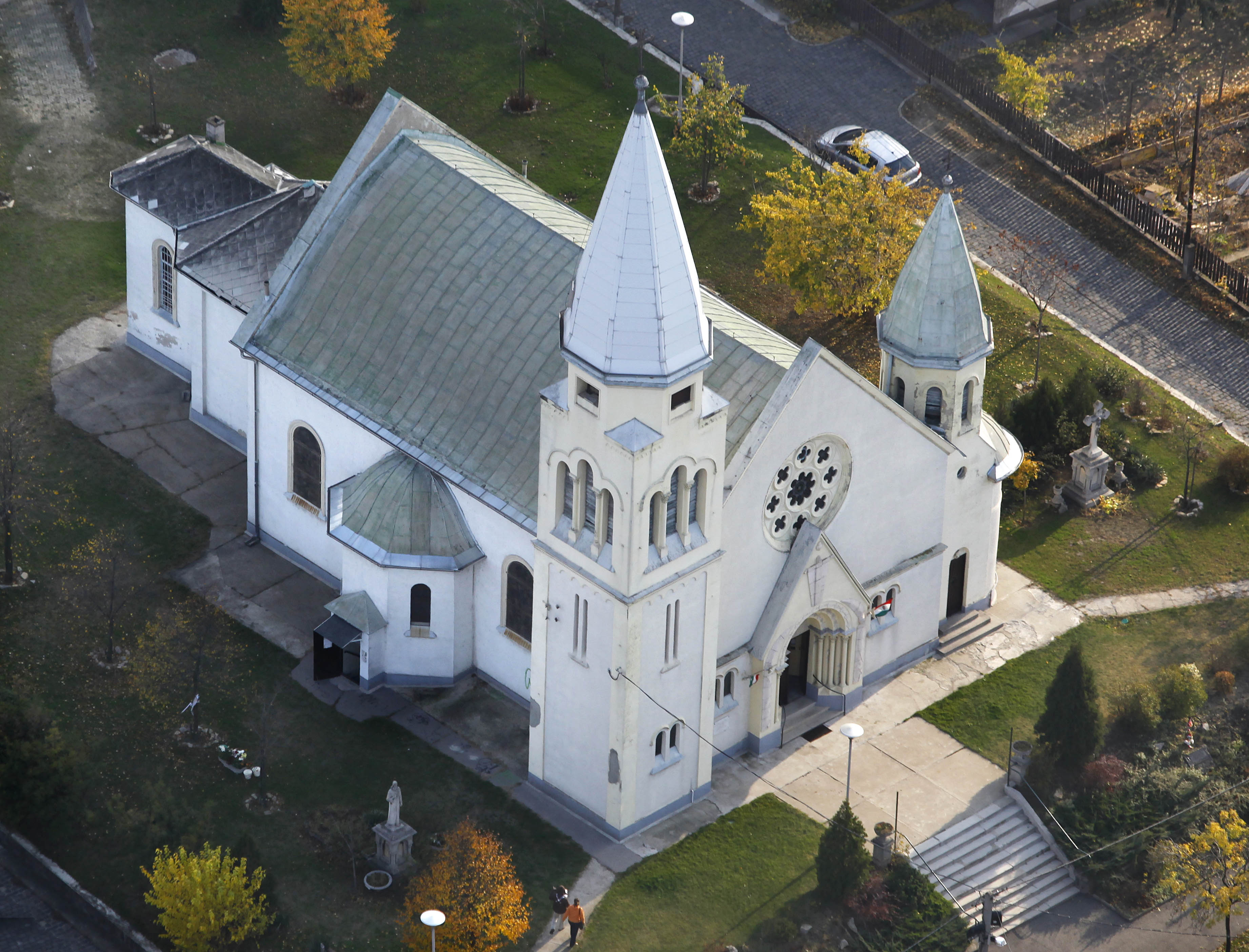
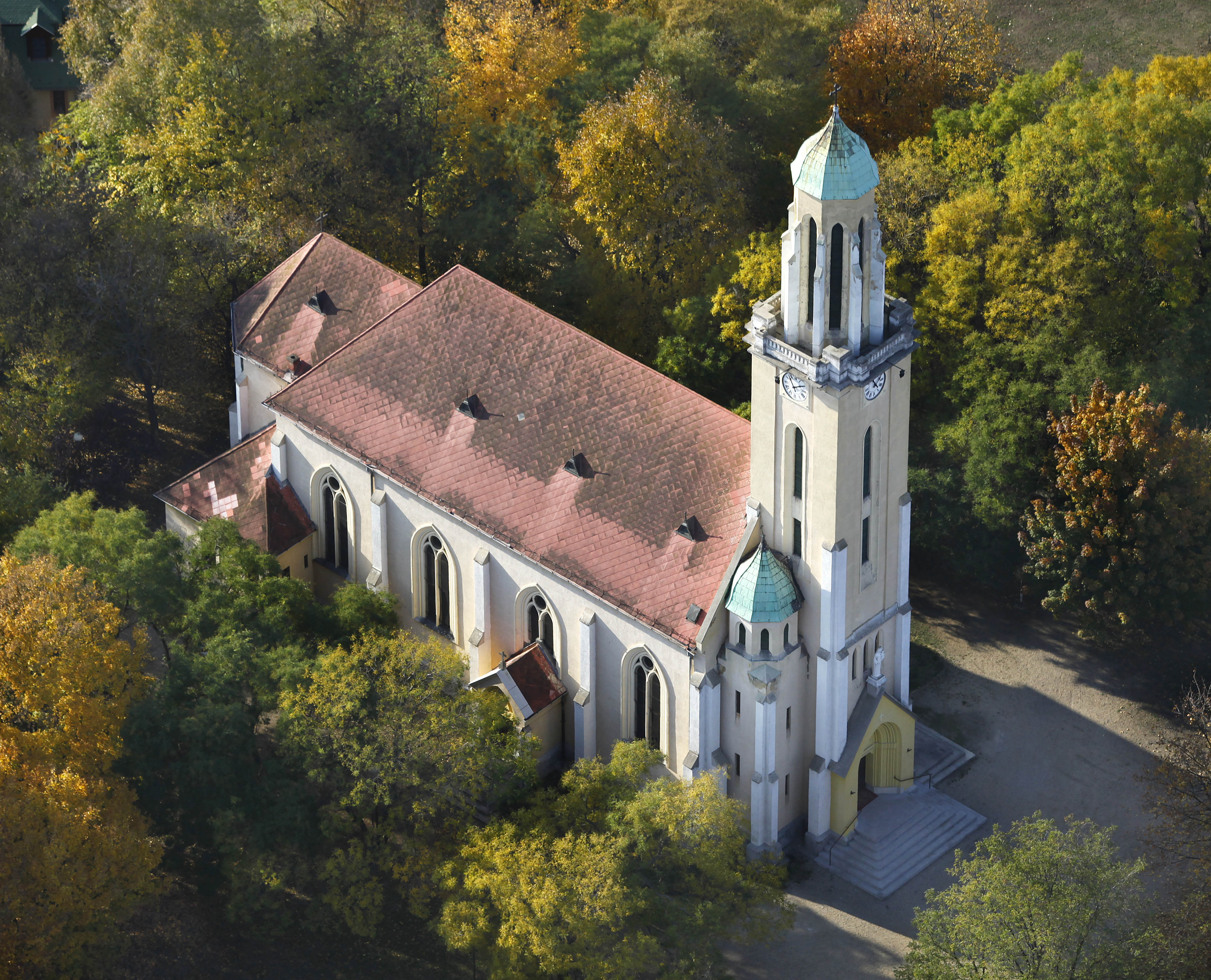
| Picture | Name | Construction time | Architectural style | Designer | Address, comments |
|---|---|---|---|---|---|
| | Pesterzsébeti Árpádházi Szent Erzsébet templom | 1908–1909 | neogothic | Bánszky Mihály | 1204 Budapest, Kossuth Lajos u. 60 |
| | Pesterzsébet–Szabótelepi Jézus Szíve plébániatemplom | 1930–1935 | neogothic | n. a. | 1202 Budapest, Csoma u. 15. |
| | Kossuthfalvai Szent Lajos plébániatemplom | 1930 | neo-romanesque (?) | n. a. | 1204 Budapest, Szent Lajos tér 1. |
| | Pacsirtatelepi Magyarok Nagyasszonya templom | 1930–1936 | neogothic | Diebold Hermann | 1201 Budapest, Magyarok Nagyasszonya tér 12. |
| | Pesterzsébet-Kakastó Szent Antal kápolna | before 1944 | n. a. | n. a. | 1204 Budapest, Kolozsvár u. 40. It was built in 1944 from an emergency apartment. |

=== Greek Catholic churches ===
| Picture | Name | Construction time | Architectural style | Designer | Address, comments |
|---|---|---|---|---|---|
| | Pesterzsébeti Urunk Színeváltozása görögkatolikus templom | 1920s | neogothic (?) | n. a. | 1201 Budapest, Vörösmarty u. 30. Originally designed for Roman Catholic nuns. Greek Catholic church from the 1990s. |

=== Reformed churches ===
| Picture | Name | Construction time | Architectural style | Designer | Address, comments |
|---|---|---|---|---|---|
| | Pesterzsébet központi református templom | 1915–1922 | n. a. | n. a. | 1202 Budapest, Mártírok útja 149. |
| | Pesterzsébet–Szabótelepi Mártírok úti református imaház | before 1980 | n. a. | n. a. | 1202 Budapest, Mártírok útja 149. |
| | Pesterzsébet–Szabótelepi Torockó utcai református imaház | before 1985 | n. a. | n. a. | 1202 Budapest, Torockó utca 20. |
| | Pesterzsébeti református templom | 1939–2019 | Hungarian folk | Szeghalmy Bálint | 1201 Budapest, Klapka tér 1. During World War II, construction was halted. Its completion was proposed in 1994, which was carried out between 2017 and 2019 according to the original plans. |
| | Pesterzsébeti Összetartozás-templom | 2019–2021 | organic | Makovecz Imre, Dósa Papp Tamás | 1204 Budapest, Mátyás király tér |

=== Evangelical churches ===
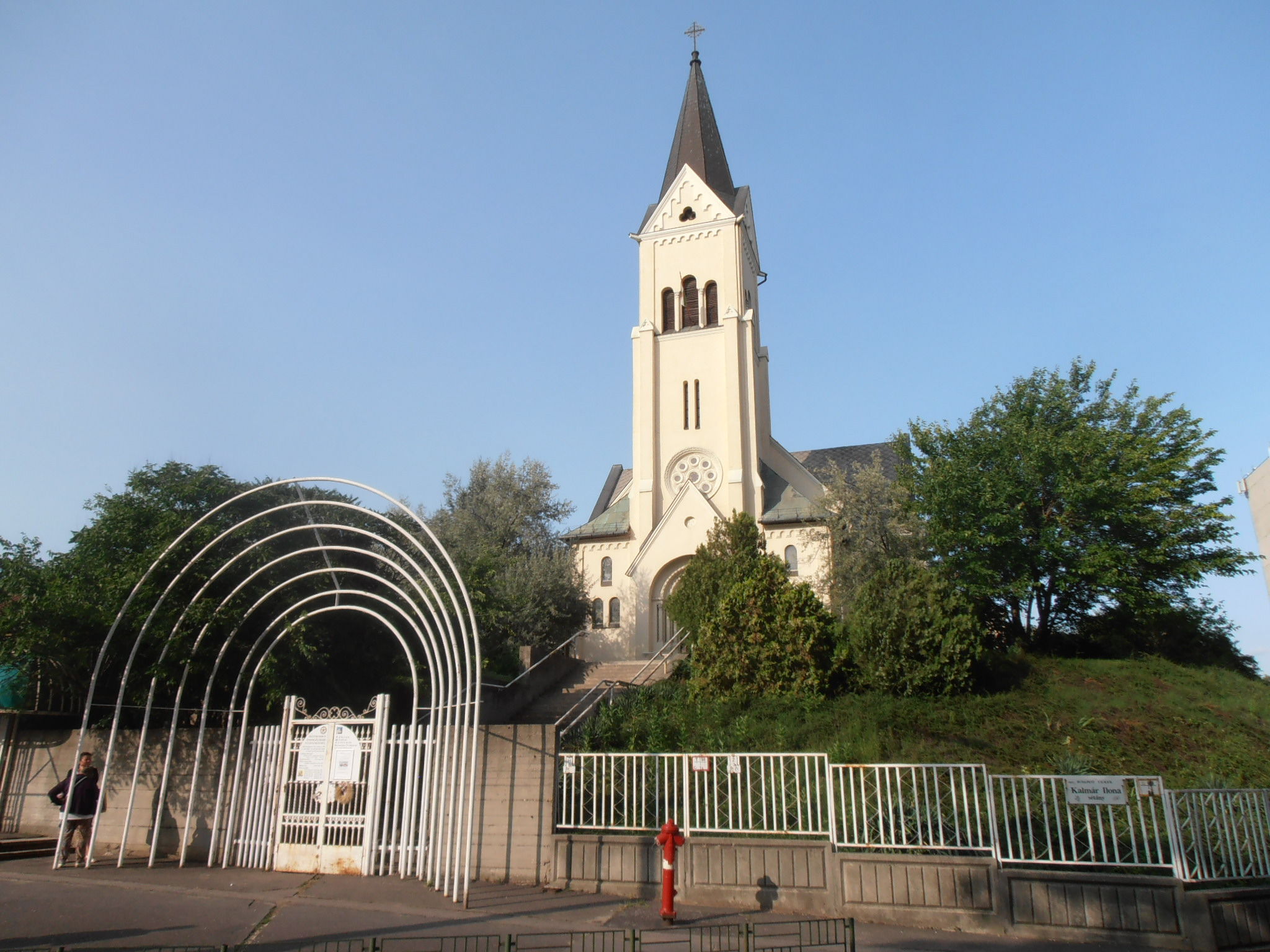
| Picture | Name | Construction time | Architectural style | Designer | Address, comments |
|---|---|---|---|---|---|
| | Pesterzsébeti evangélikus templom | 1926 | neogothic | n. a. | 1204 Budapest, Ady Endre u. 89. |

=== Other churches ===
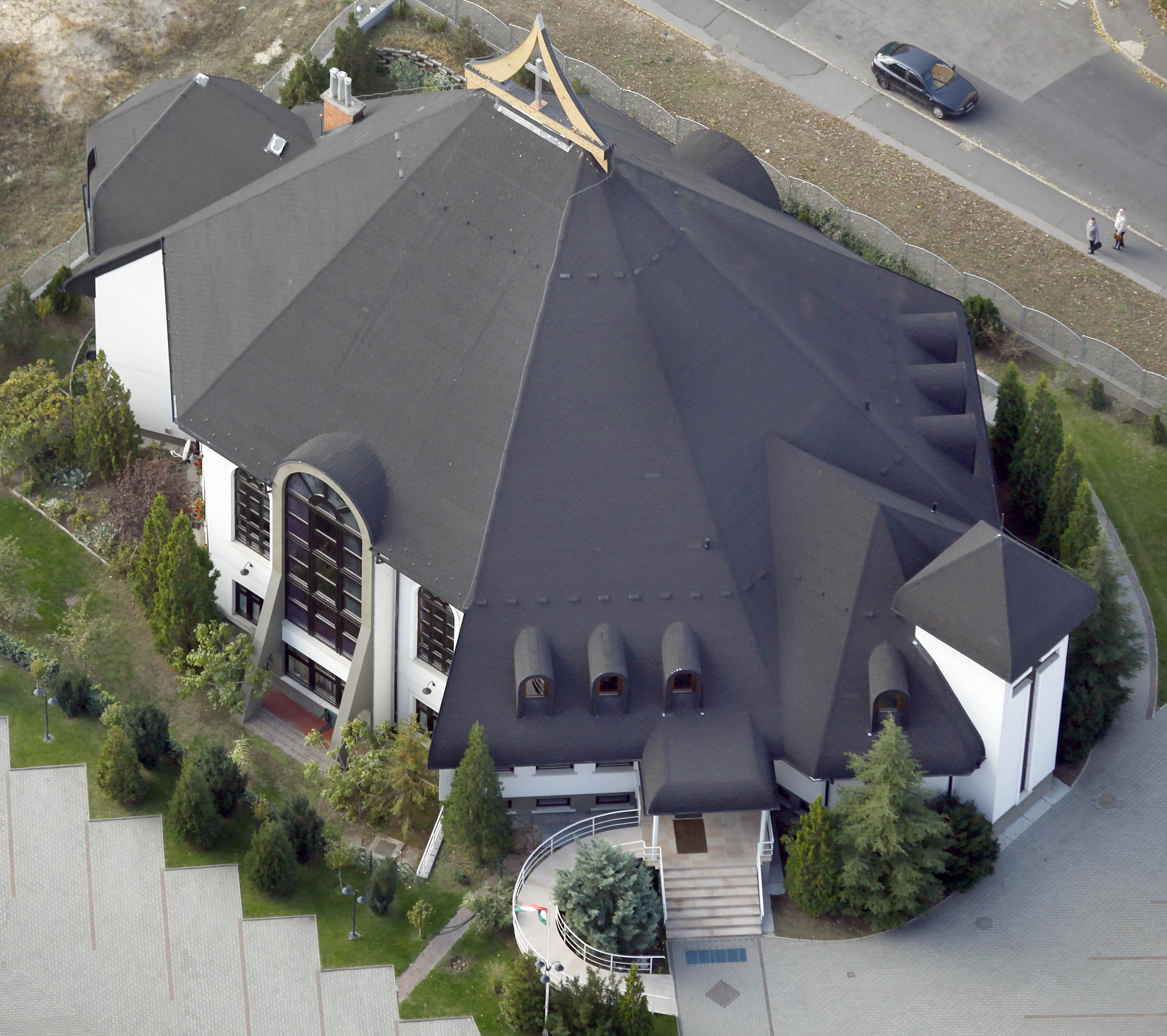
| Picture | Name | Construction time | Architectural style | Designer | Address, comments |
|---|---|---|---|---|---|
| | Pesterzsébeti baptista templom | 1993–1998 | n. a. | n. a. | 1203 Budapest, Ady Endre utca 58. |
| | Pesterzsébeti adventista imaház | n. a. | n. a. | n. a. | 1205 Budapest, Kossuth Lajos u. 128. |

== District XXI ==
=== Roman Catholic churches ===
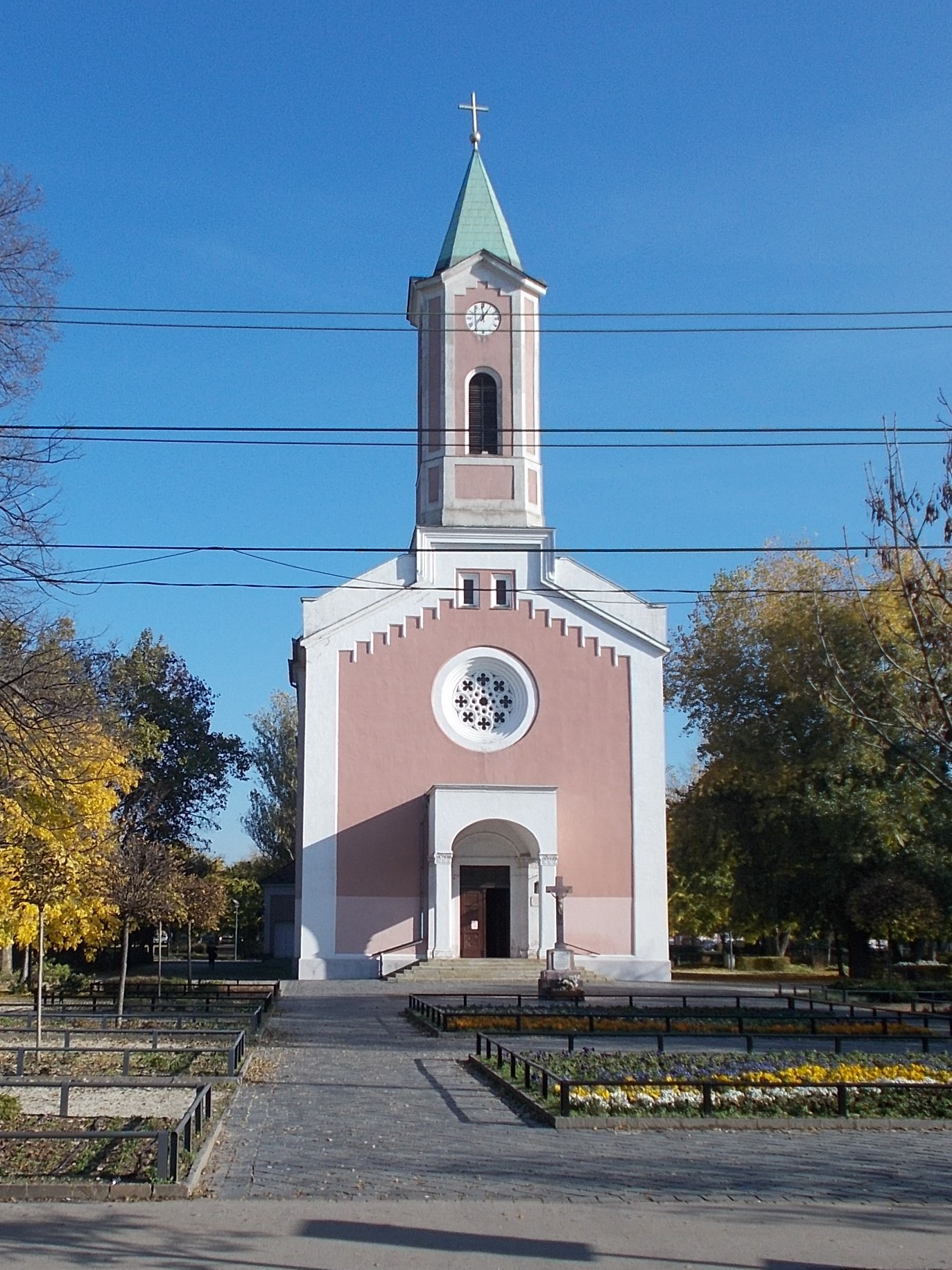
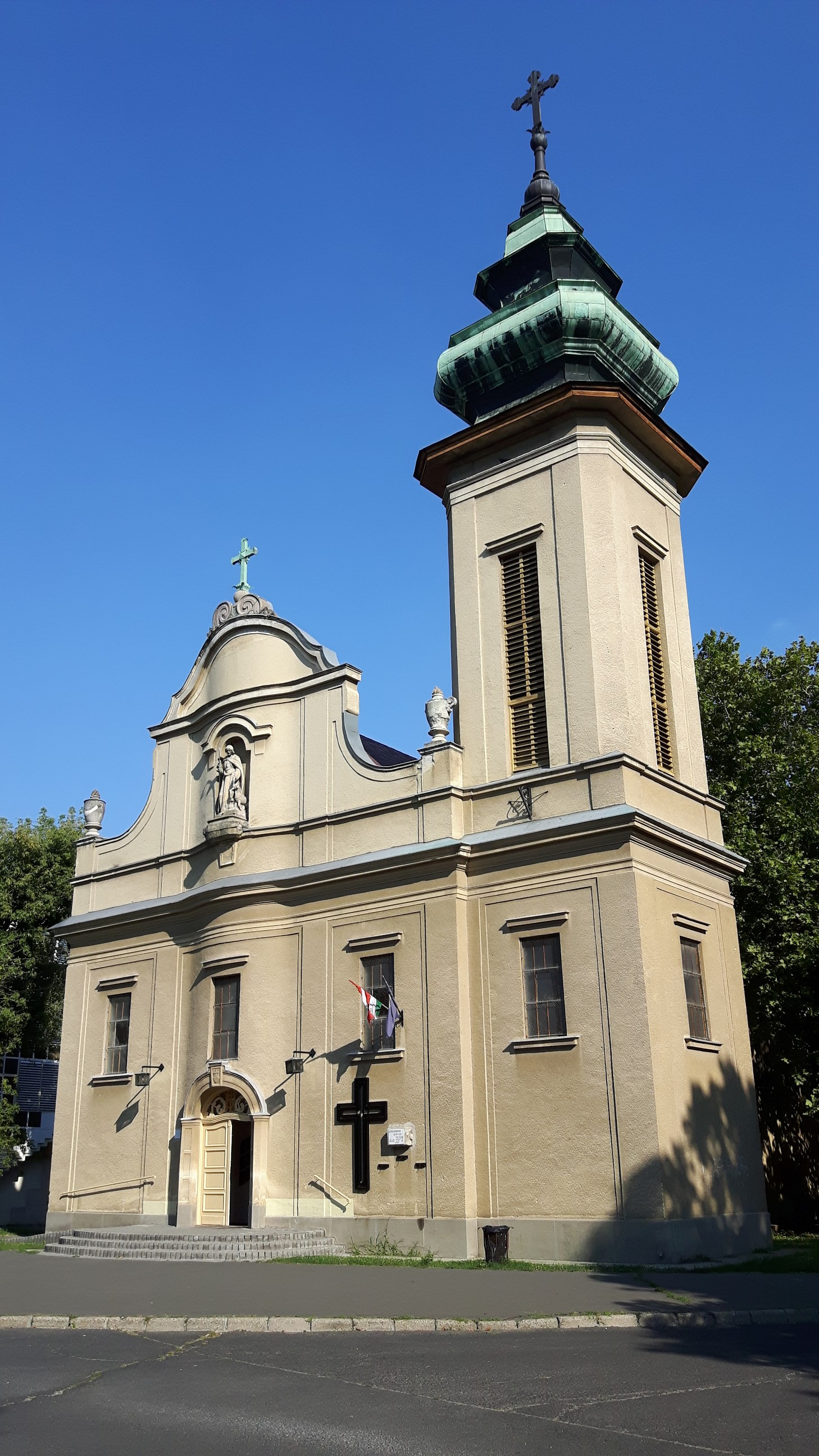
| Picture | Name | Construction time | Architectural style | Designer | Address, comments |
|---|---|---|---|---|---|
| | Csepeli Kisboldogasszony-templom | 1857–1862 | romantic | n. a. | 1211 Budapest, Templom u. 29. |
| | Csepeli Jézus Szíve templom | 1930–1933 | neo-baroque | Irsy László | 1214 Budapest, Sas utca 10. |
| | Csepel–Királyerdői Szűz Mária Szeplőtelen Szíve templom | 1967 | n. a. | n. a. | 1213 Budapest, Szent István út 216. |

=== Greek Catholic churches ===
| Picture | Name | Construction time | Architectural style | Designer | Address, comments |
|---|---|---|---|---|---|
| | Csepeli Szentlélek görögkatolikus templom | 2000–2001 | n. a. | n. a. | 1212 Budapest, Rákóczi kert 33. |

=== Reformed churches ===
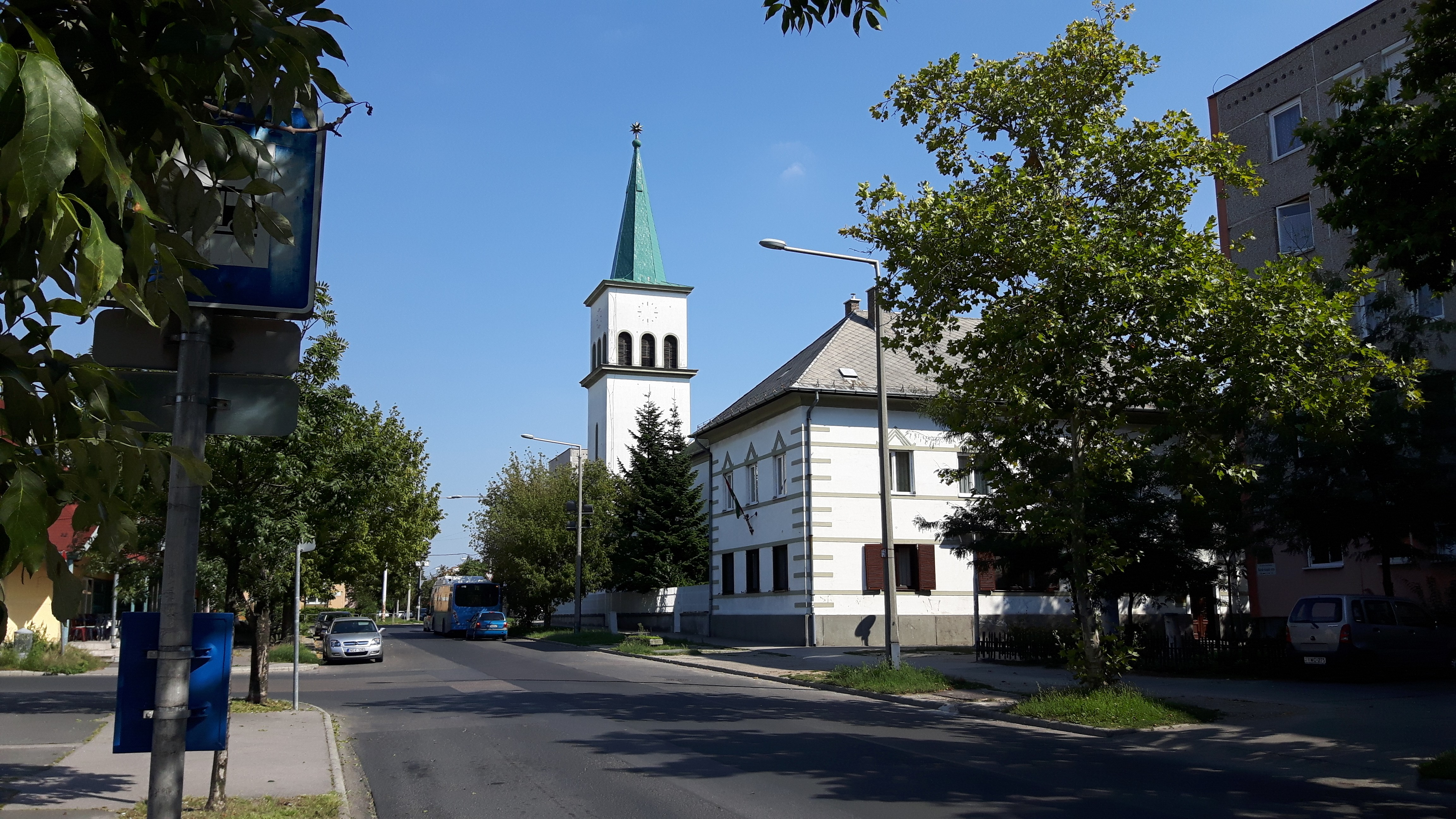
| Picture | Name | Construction time | Architectural style | Designer | Address, comments |
|---|---|---|---|---|---|
| | Csepeli központi református templom | 1927–1928 | n. a. | ifj. Ybl Miklós | 1211 Budapest, Károli Gáspár u. 13. |
| | Csepel–Királyerdői református templom | 1937 | n. a. | n. a. | 1213 Budapest, Szent István út 194–196. |

=== Evangelical churches ===
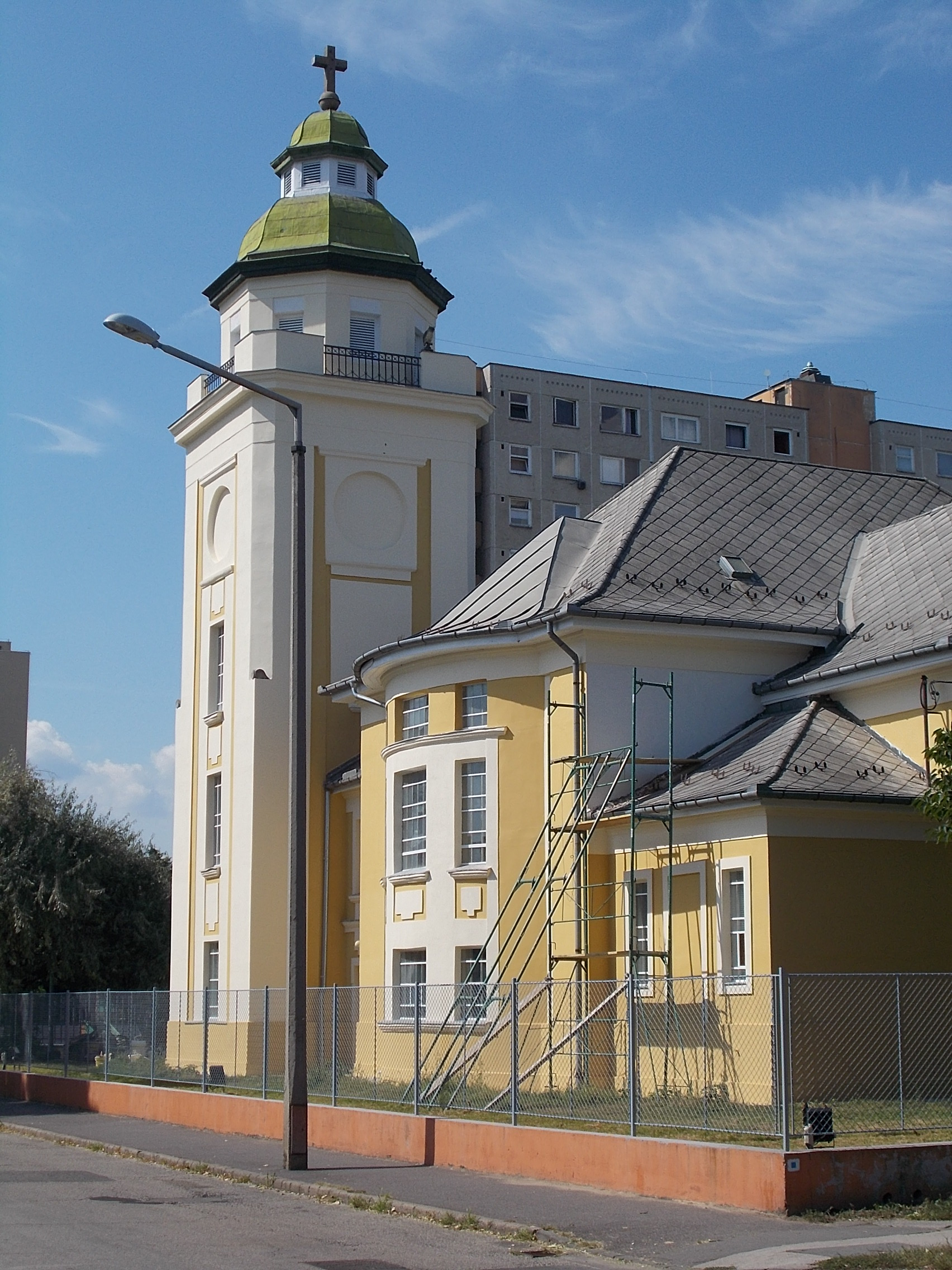
| Picture | Name | Construction time | Architectural style | Designer | Address, comments |
|---|---|---|---|---|---|
| | Csepeli evangélikus templom | 1926–1928 | n. a. | n. a. | 1212 Budapest, Deák tér 1. |

=== Other churches ===
| Picture | Name | Construction time | Architectural style | Designer | Address, comments |
|---|---|---|---|---|---|
| | Csepeli baptista imaház | n. a. | n. a. | n. a. | 1215 Budapest, Károli Gáspár u. 35. |
| | Csepeli adventista imaház | n. a. | n. a. | n. a. | 1212 Budapest, Petőfi u. 81. |

== District XXII ==
=== Roman Catholic churches ===
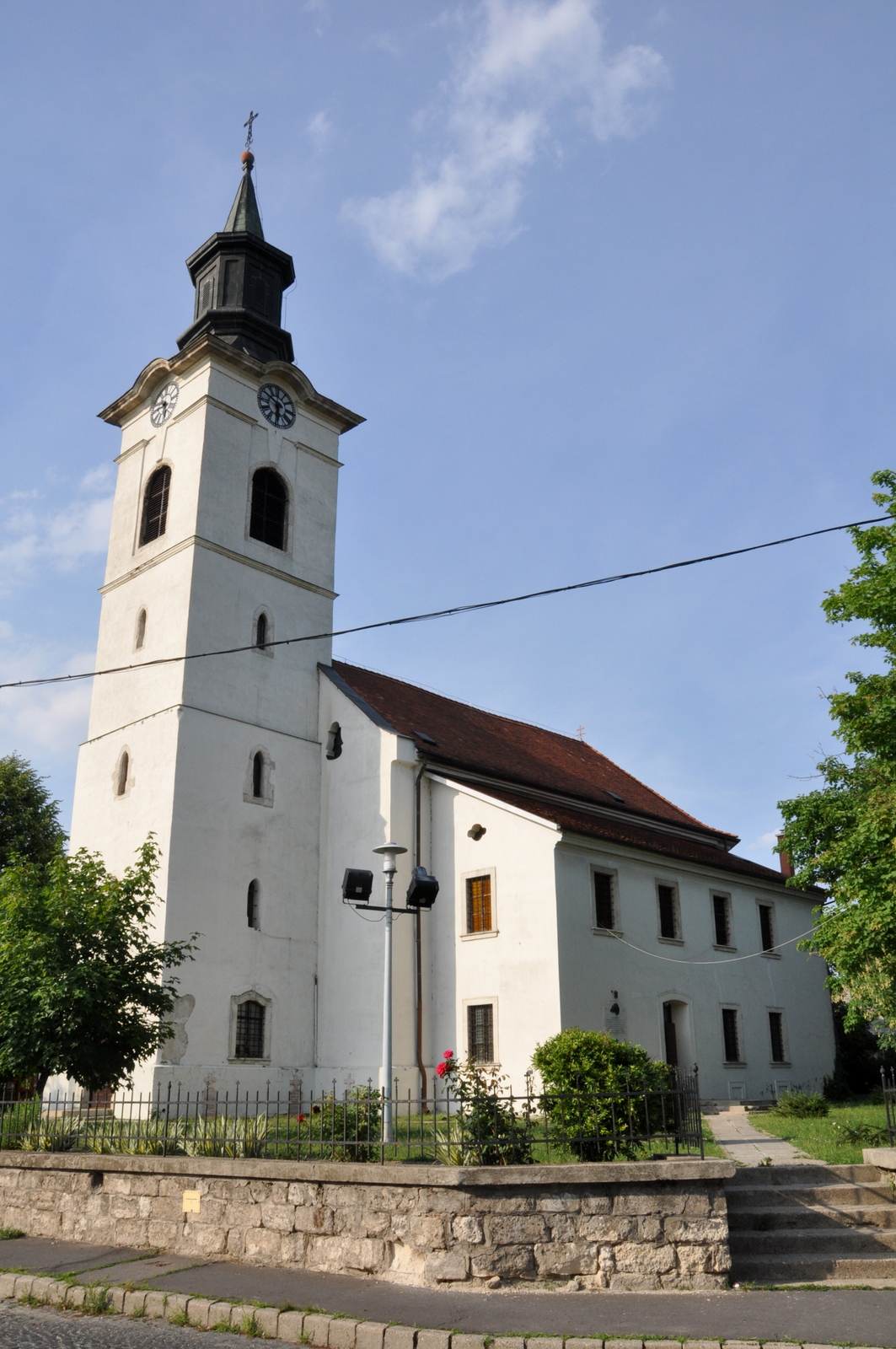
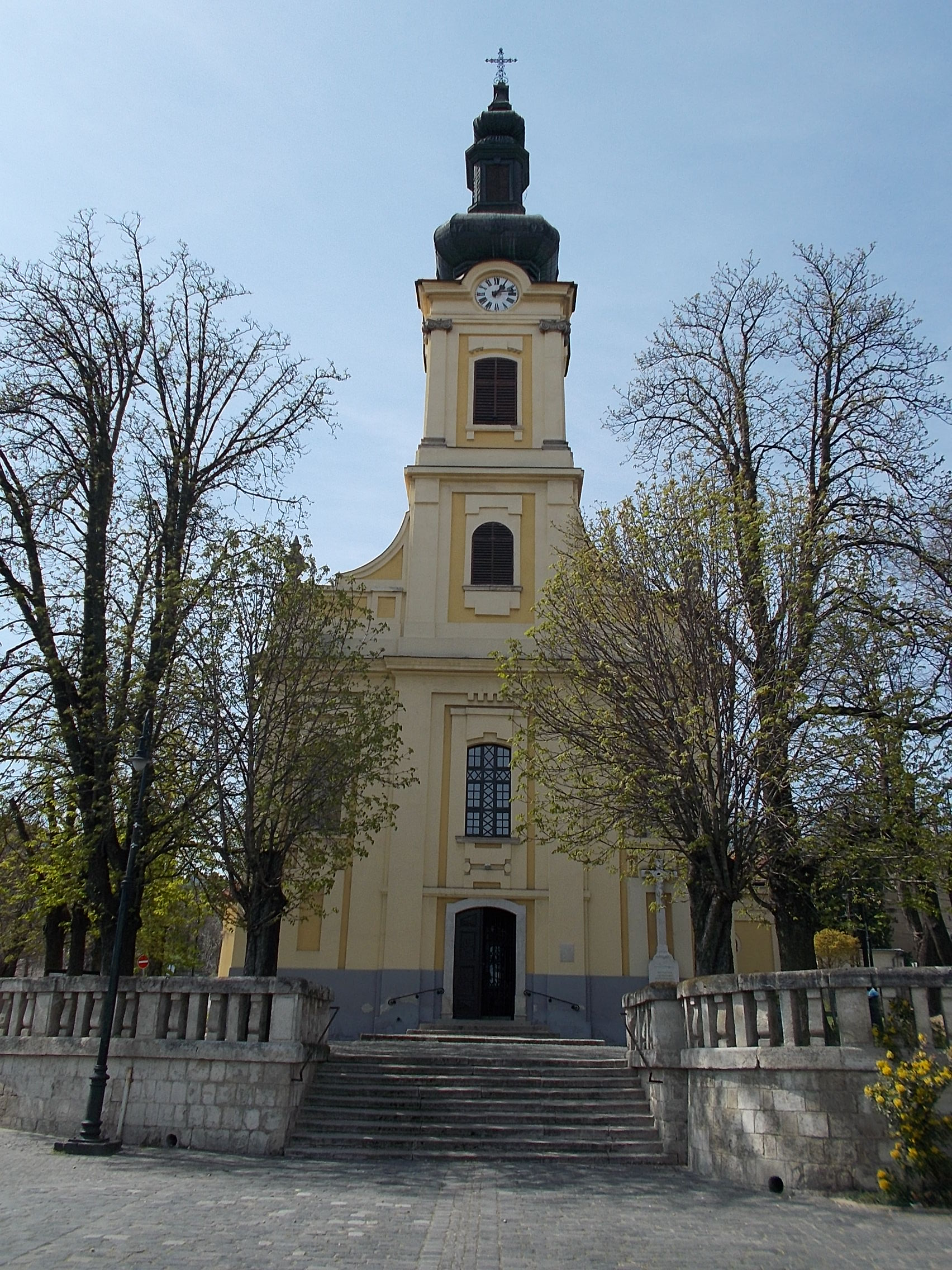
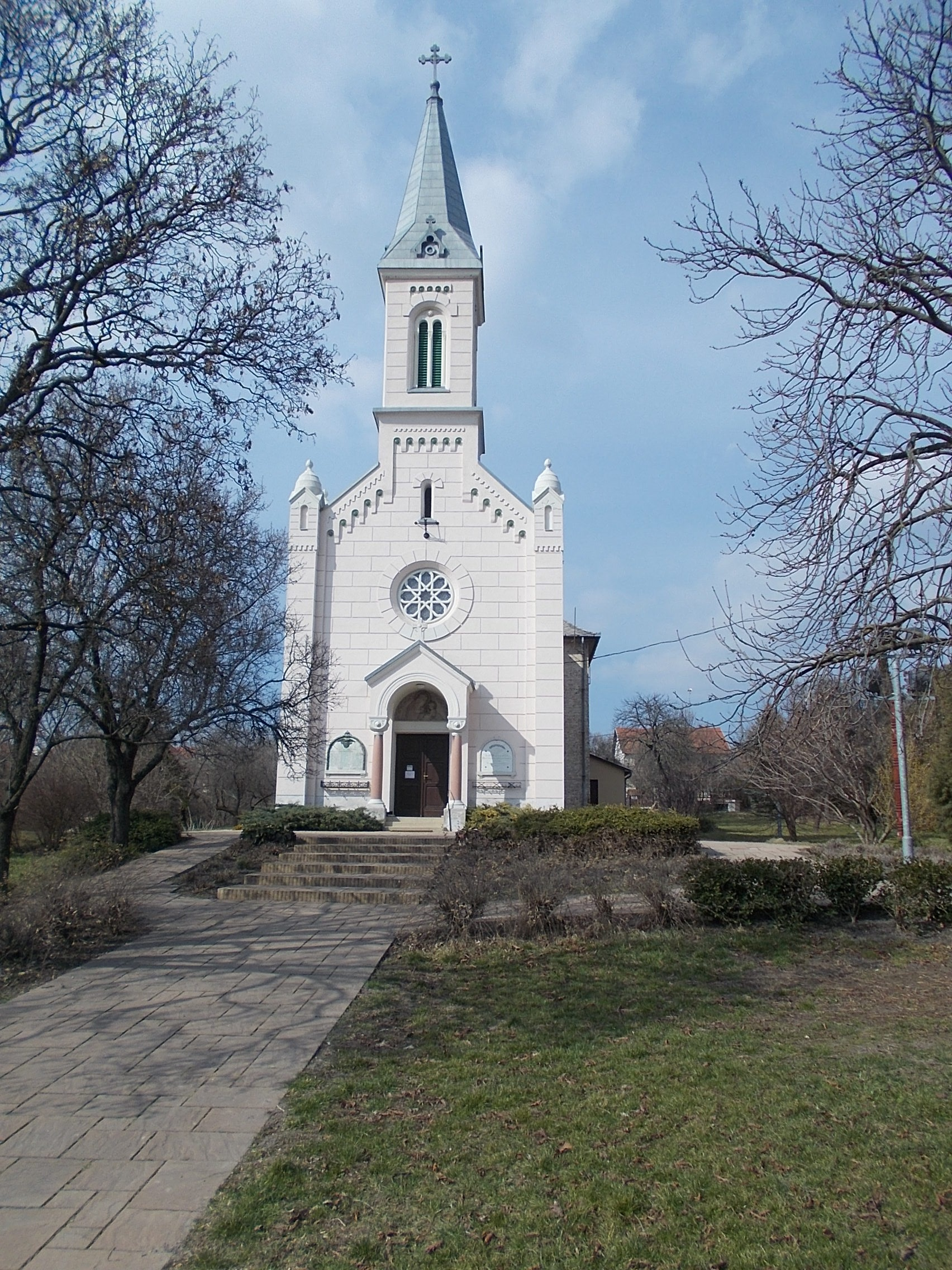
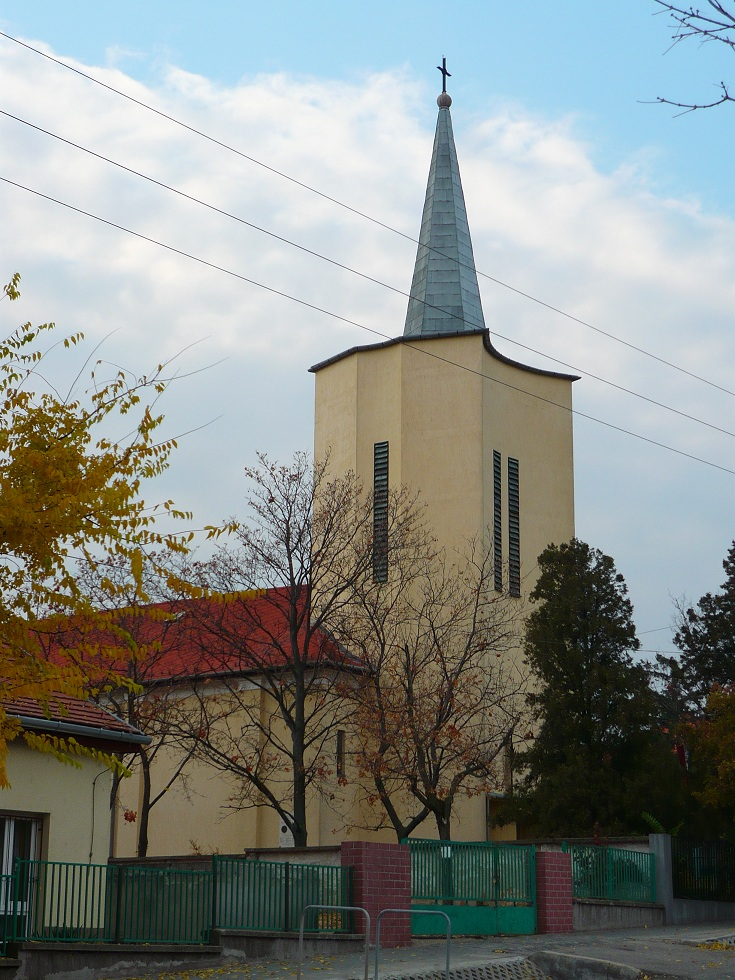
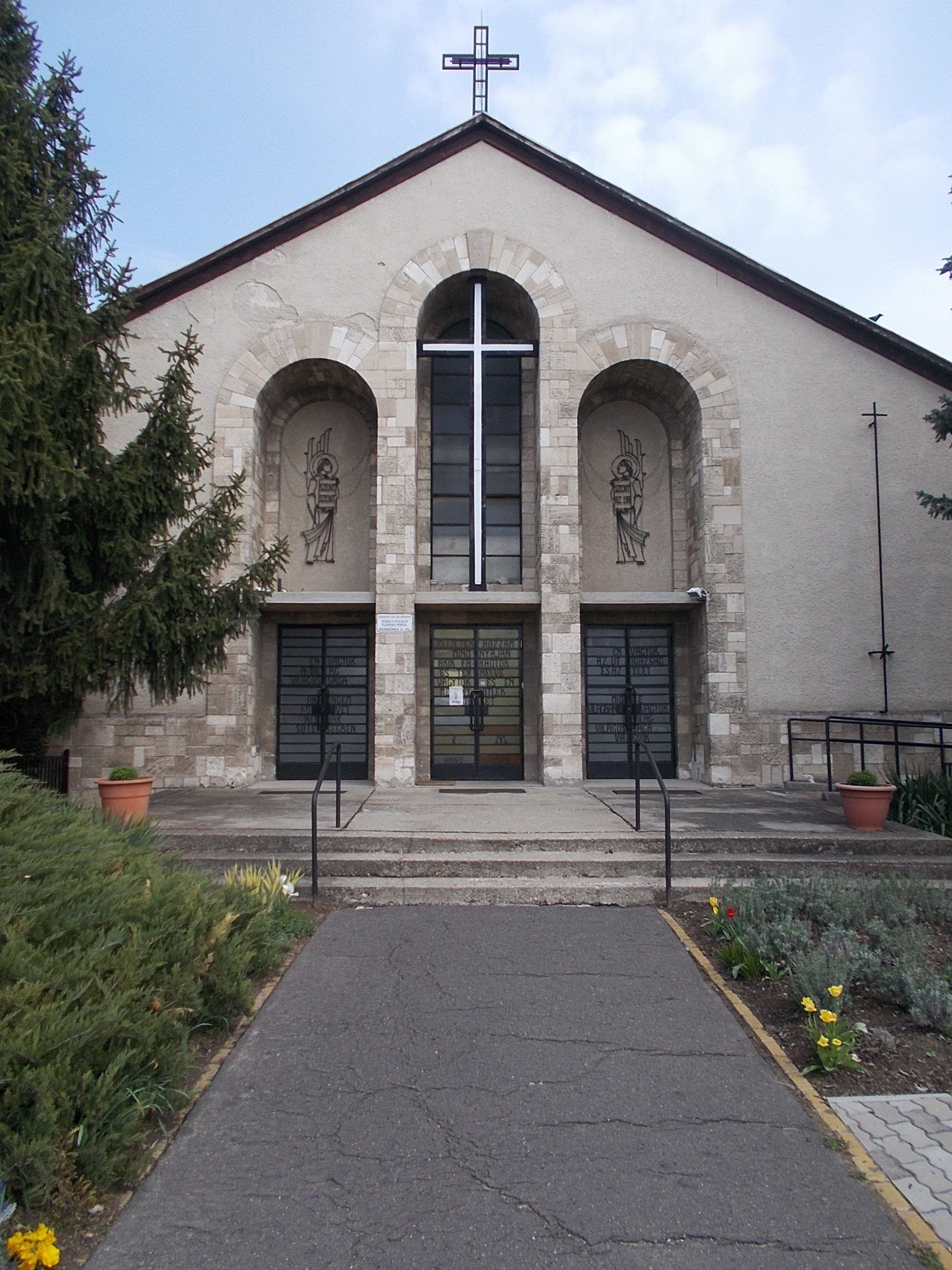
| Picture | Name | Construction time | Architectural style | Designer | Address, comments |
|---|---|---|---|---|---|
| | Nagytétényi Nagyboldogasszony-plébániatemplom | 1753–1754 | baroque | n. a. | 1225 Budapest, Nagytétényi út 286. The building also includes the tower and sanctuary of the former parish church of St. Michael, built in 1333. |
| | Budafoki Szent Lipót-templom | 1755 | baroque | n. a. | 1221 Budapest, Plébánia u. 2. |
| | Budatétényi Szent Mihály kápolna | 1780 | baroque | n. a. | 1223 Budapest, Kápolna u. 31. |
| | Budatétényi Szent István-templom | 1904–1912 | neo-romanesque | Gerster Kálmán | 1223 Budapest, Bajcsy-Zsilinszky u. 163. |
| | Baross Gábor telepi Jézus Szíve plébániatemplom | 1933 | modern | Irsy László | 1224 Budapest, Dózsa György út 96. The tower was built in 1948 according to the plans of Jenő Kismarthy-Lechner. |
| | Budafoki Jézus Szíve templom | 1948–1950 | n. a. | n. a. | 1222 Budapest, Pannónia u. 48. |
| | Budafoki temető Král-kápolnája | n. a. | n. a. | n. a. | 1222 Budapest, Temető u. 12. |

=== Greek Catholic churches ===
| Picture | Name | Construction time | Architectural style | Designer | Address, comments |
|---|---|---|---|---|---|
| | Budafoki Péter-Pál görögkatolikus kápolna | 1831 | baroque | n. a. | 1221 Budapest, Péter-Pál u. 1. |

=== Reformed churches ===
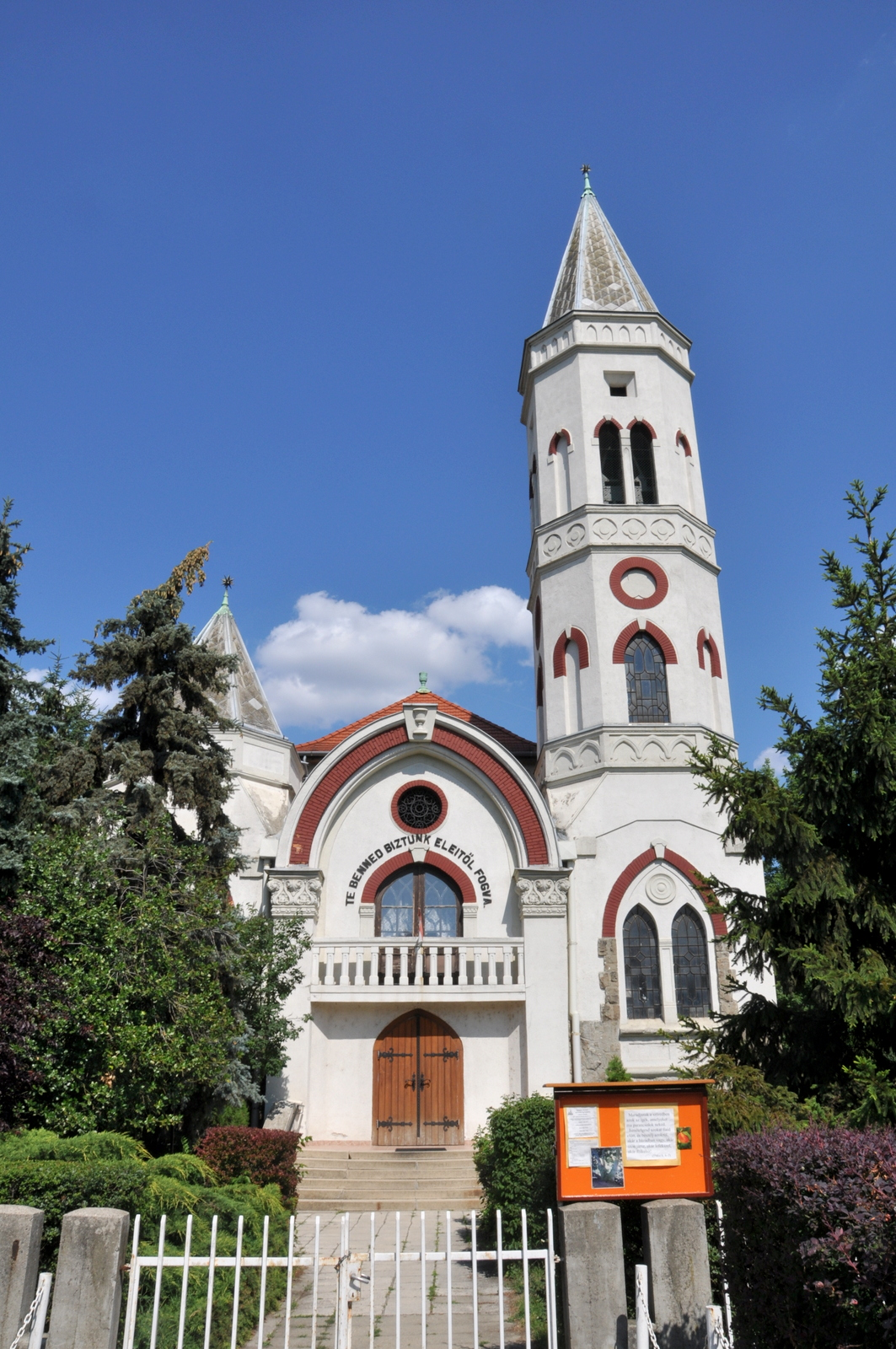
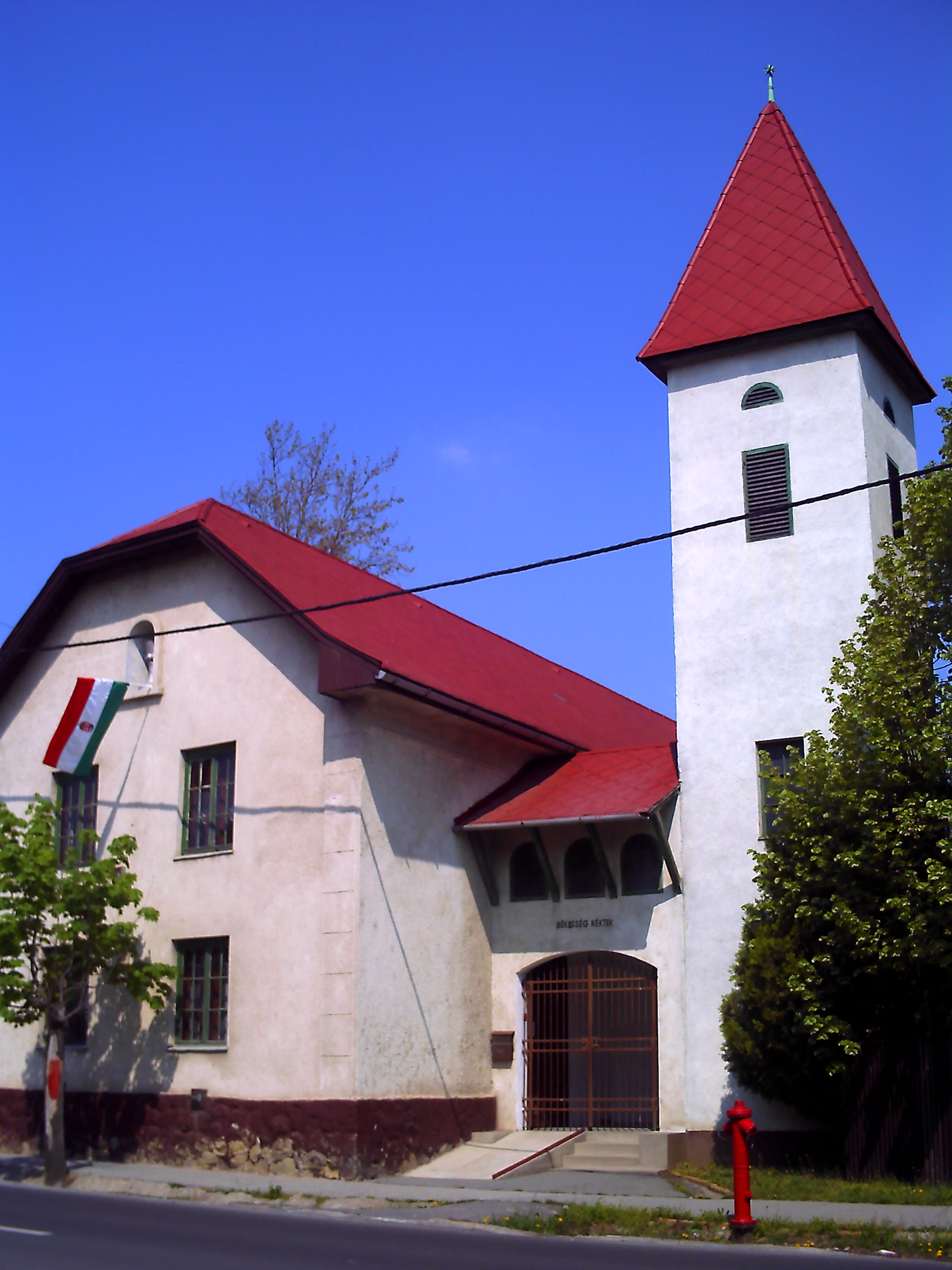
| Picture | Name | Construction time | Architectural style | Designer | Address, comments |
|---|---|---|---|---|---|
| | Magyar Feltámadás Temploma (Budafoki református templom) | 1927 | neo-romanesque (?) | n. a. | 1221 Budapest, Demjén István u. 2. |
| | Nagytétényi református templom | 1929 | n. a. | n. a. | 1225 Budapest, Angeli u. 13. Its tower was built only in 1956. |

=== Evangelical churches ===
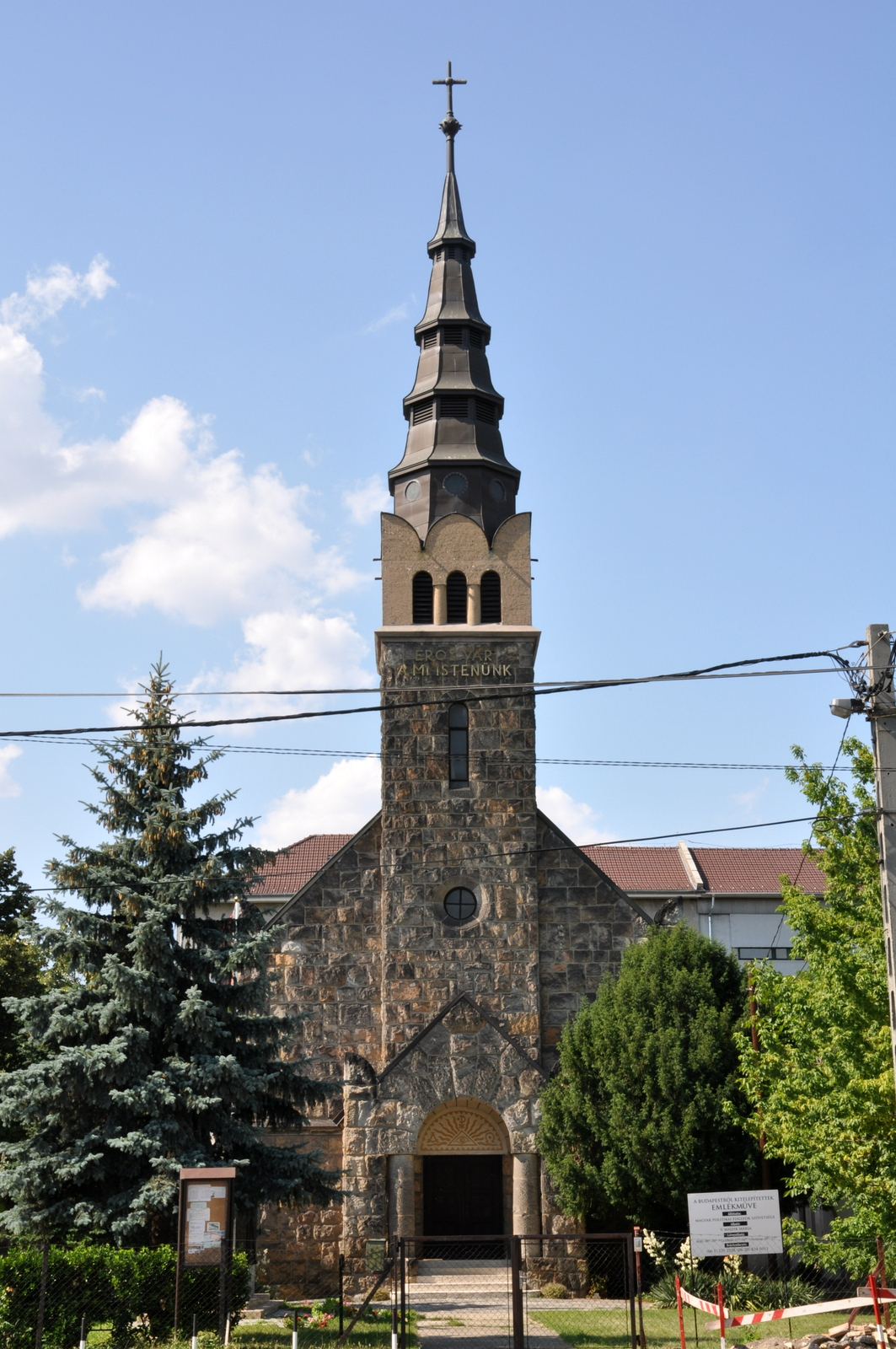
| Picture | Name | Construction time | Architectural style | Designer | Address, comments |
|---|---|---|---|---|---|
| | Budafoki evangélikus templom | 1934–1935 | neo-romanesque | Gyula Sándy | 1221 Budapest, Játék u. 16. |

=== Other churches ===
| Picture | Name | Construction time | Architectural style | Designer | Address, comments |
|---|---|---|---|---|---|
| | Budafoki régi baptista imaház | n. a. | n. a. | n. a. | 1221 Budapest, Gellért u. 9. It was in use until the 1980s. |
| | Budafoki Gyülekezet Isten Háza | 1979–1982 | n. a. | n. a. | 1221 Budapest, Péter-Pál u. 17–19. Baptist house of worship. |
| | Rózsakert Baptista Közösség Rózsakert Közösségi Háza | 2007–2010 | n. a. | n. a. | 1223 Budapest, Dézsmaház u. 33. Upstairs church and part Butterfly nursery. |

== District XXIII ==
=== Roman Catholic churches ===
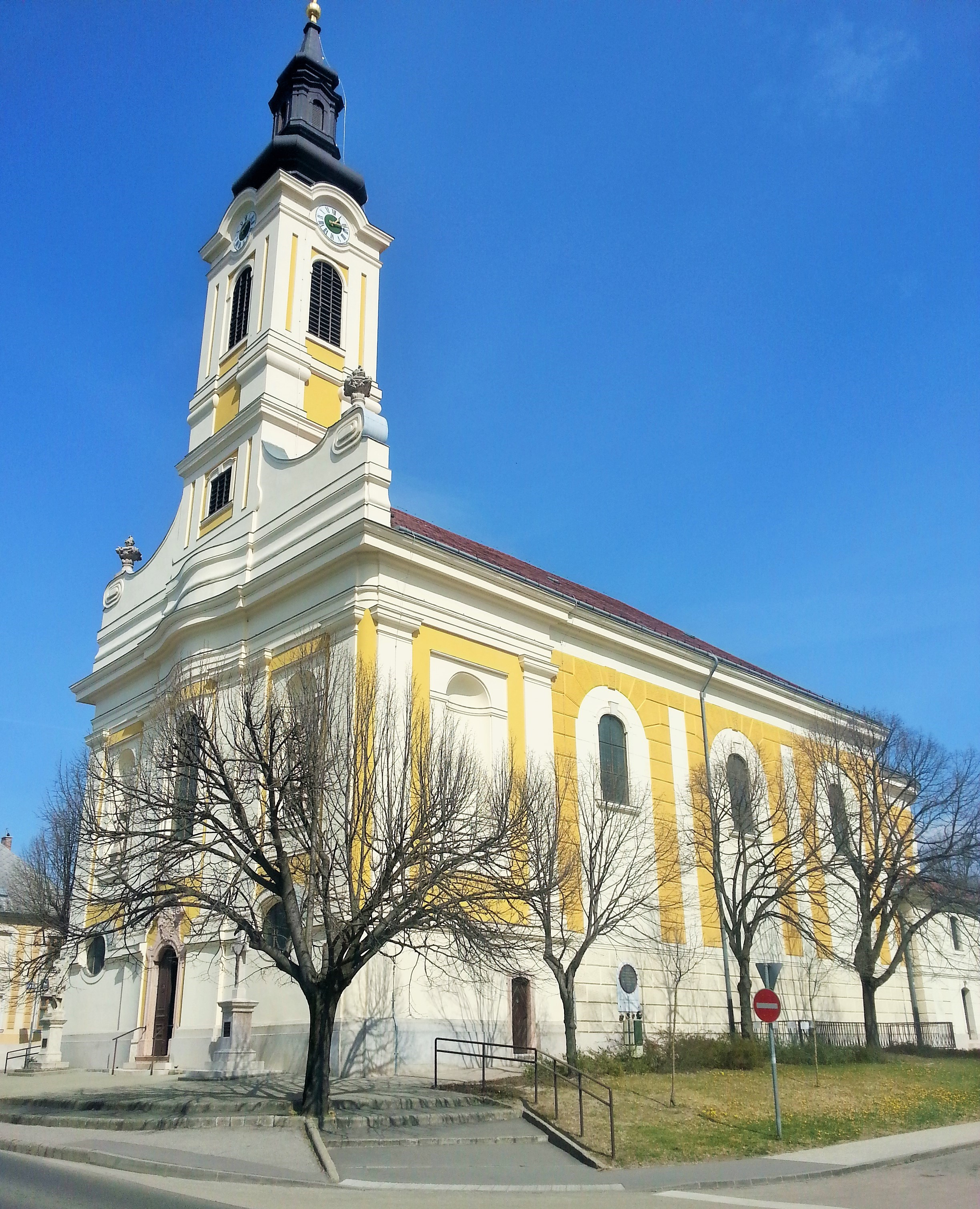
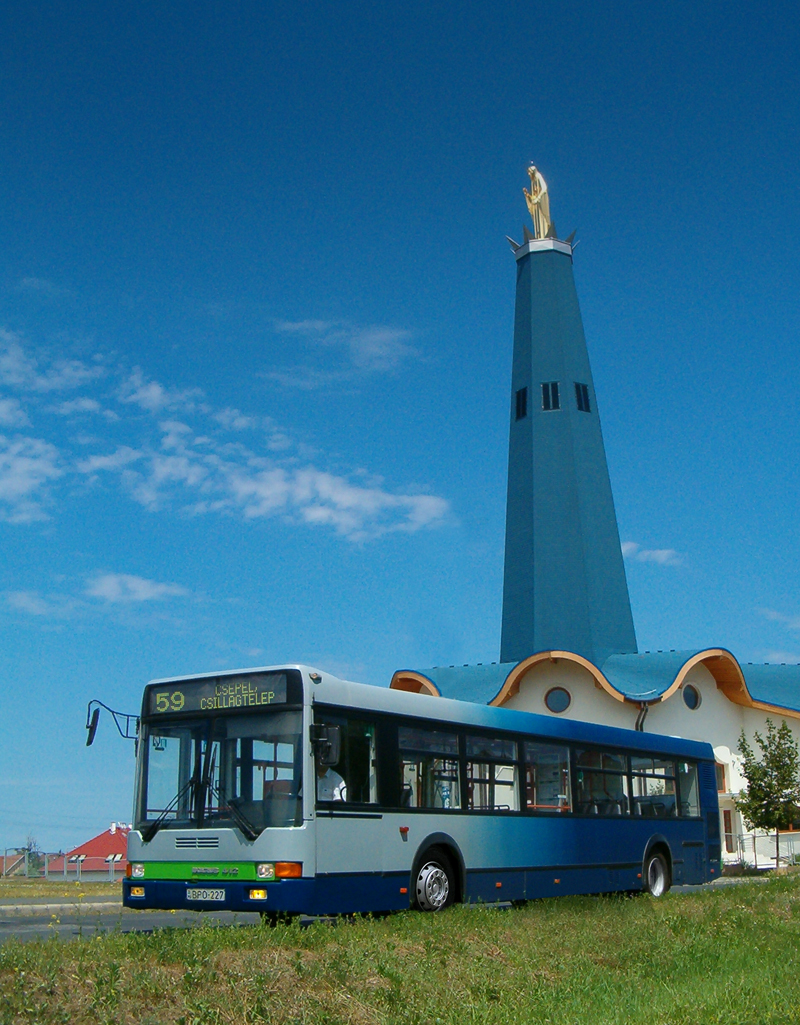
| Picture | Name | Construction time | Architectural style | Designer | Address, comments |
|---|---|---|---|---|---|
| | Soroksári Nagyboldogasszony-templom | 1758–1761 | baroque | n. a. | 1238 Budapest, Hősök tere 9. |
| | Soroksári Segítő Mária kápolna | 1879–1880 | baroque | n. a. | 1238 Budapest, Helsinki út. Previously, a wooden chapel stood in its place. |
| | Budapesti Fatimai Szűzanya templom | 2000–2002 | n. a. | n. a. | 1237 Budapest, Szent László u. 149. |

=== Reformed churches ===
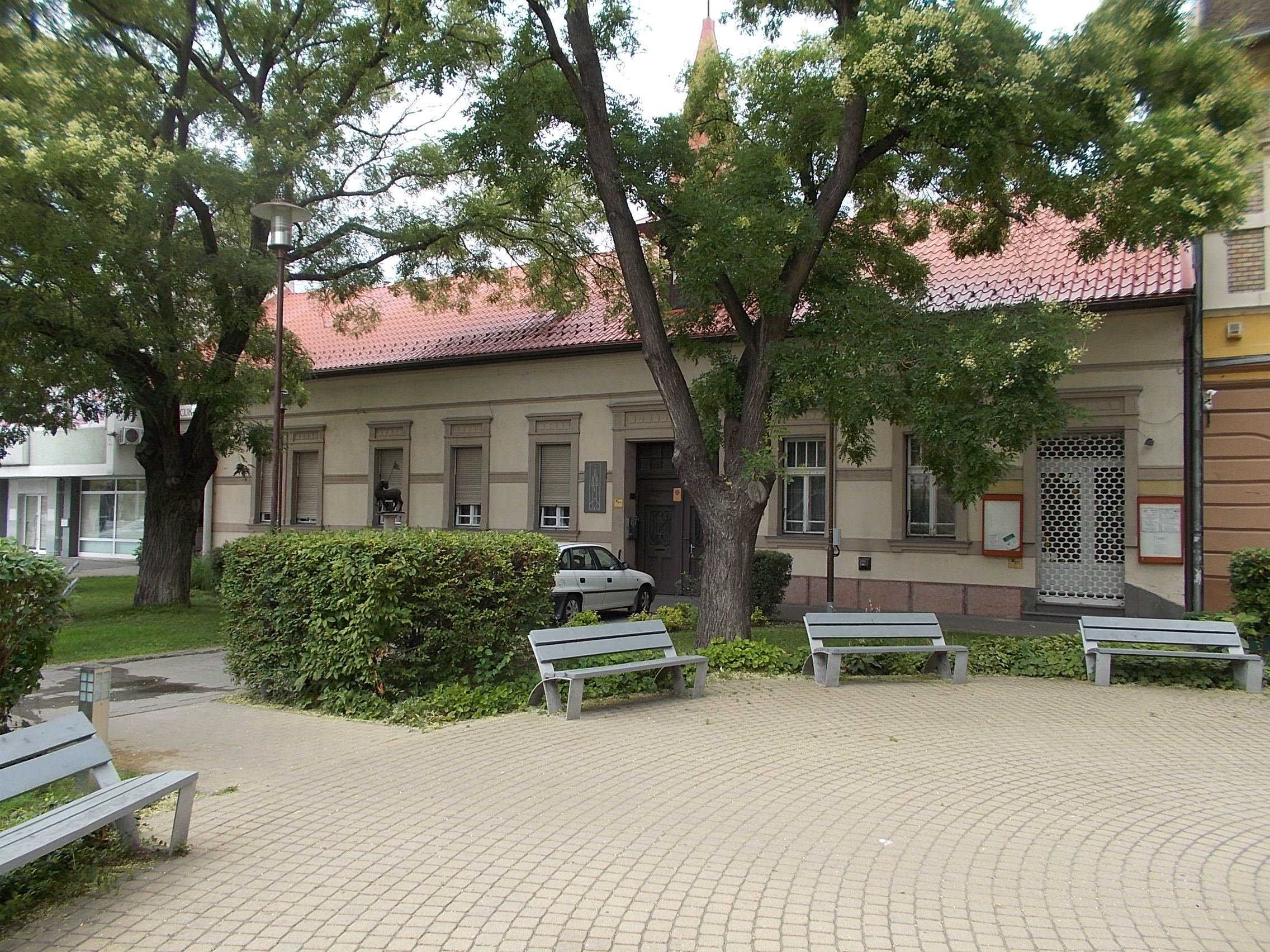
| Picture | Name | Construction time | Architectural style | Designer | Address, comments |
|---|---|---|---|---|---|
| | Soroksári református templom | 1948–1950 | n. a. | n. a. | 1238 Budapest, Hősök tere 11. |

=== Evangelical churches ===
| Picture | Name | Construction time | Architectural style | Designer | Address, comments |
|---|---|---|---|---|---|
| | Soroksári evangélikus imaház | 2017 előtt | n. a. | n. a. | 1239 Budapest, Hősök tere 42. A family house was converted into a house of prayer. |

== Literature ==
- Gr. La Rosée Erzsébet: Budapest katolikus templomai, Szent István Társulat, Budapest, 1938.
- (szerk.) Kováts J. István: Magyar református templomok I–II., Athenaeum-Betűvetés Könyv- és Lapkiadóvállalat Kft., Budapest, 1942.
- (szerk.) Kemény Lajos - Gyimesy Károly: Evangélikus templomok, Athenaeum-Evangélikus Templomok Kiadóhivatala, Budapest, 1944.
- (szerk.) Déri Erzsébet: Katolikus templomok Magyarországon, Hegyi & Társa Kiadó Bt., Budapest, 1992, ISBN 963-7592-09-1
- Református templomok Magyarországon, Hegyi & Társa Kiadó Bt., Budapest, 1992, ISBN 963-7592-13-X
- Evangélikus templomok Magyarországon, Hegyi & Társa Kiadó Bt., Budapest, 1992, ISBN 963-7592-10-5
- (szerk.) Diós István: Katolikus templomok és plébániák címjegyzéke. A Magyar Katolikus Egyház Címtára 1992 – Püspökségek, plébániák és szerzetesrendek címei, Szent István Társulat, Budapest, 1992, ISBN 963-360-653-5
- Református templomok Budapesten. Két évszázad kulturtörténete és művészete 1785–1995, Bíró Family Nyomdapiari és Kereskedelmi Kft., Budapest, 1996, ISBN 963-8363-28-2
- Zugló templomai és történelmi egyházai / [anyaggyűjtésben és a szerkesztésben részt vettek Békássy Csaba et al.], Herminamező Polgári Köre, Budapest, 2001.
- Prakfalvi Endre: Római katolikus templomok. Az egyesített fővárosban, Budapest Főváros Önkormányzata Főpolgármesteri Hivatala, Budapest, 2003, ISBN 963-9170-62-3
- Csigó László: Magyar evangélikus templomok, Anno Kiadó, Budapest, 2006, ISBN 963-375-060-1
- Tatár Sarolta: Magyar katolikus templomok, Tóth Könyvkereskedés és Kiadó Kft., Debrecen, 2009, ISBN 978-963-596-408-6

=== Church-history series of the Budapesti Városvédő Egyesület (Budapest City Protection Association) ===
- Kiadja a Budapesti Városvédő Egyesület. 2021-ig megjelent kötetek:
  - Budapest templomai: I. kerület. 2012.
  - Budapest templomai: III. kerület. 2002. (ezt még az Óbudai Múzeum adta ki)
  - Budapest templomai: Újpest, IV. kerület. 2015.
  - Budapest templomai: V. kerület. 2003.
  - Budapest templomai: Terézváros, VI. kerület. 2016.
  - Budapest templomai: Erzsébetváros, VII. kerület. 2014.
  - Budapest templomai: Józsefváros, VIII. kerület. 2009.
  - Budapest templomai: Ferencváros, IX. kerület. 2009.
  - Budapest templomai: Kőbánya, X. kerület. 2010.
  - Budapest templomai: XI. kerület. 2014.
  - Budapest templomai: XII. kerület. 2005.
  - Budapest templomai: Angyalföld, XIII. kerület. 2017.
  - Budapest templomai: XVI. kerület. 2009.
  - Budapest templomai: Rákosmente, XVII. kerület. 2009.
  - Budapest templomai: XVIII. kerület: Pestszentlőrinc, Pestszentimre. 2012.
  - Budapest templomai: Kispest, XIX. kerület. 2016.
  - Budapest templomai: Pesterzsébet, XX. kerület. 2008.
