= Cluj-Napoca =

City and county seat of Cluj County, Romania

- County Seat and Municipality
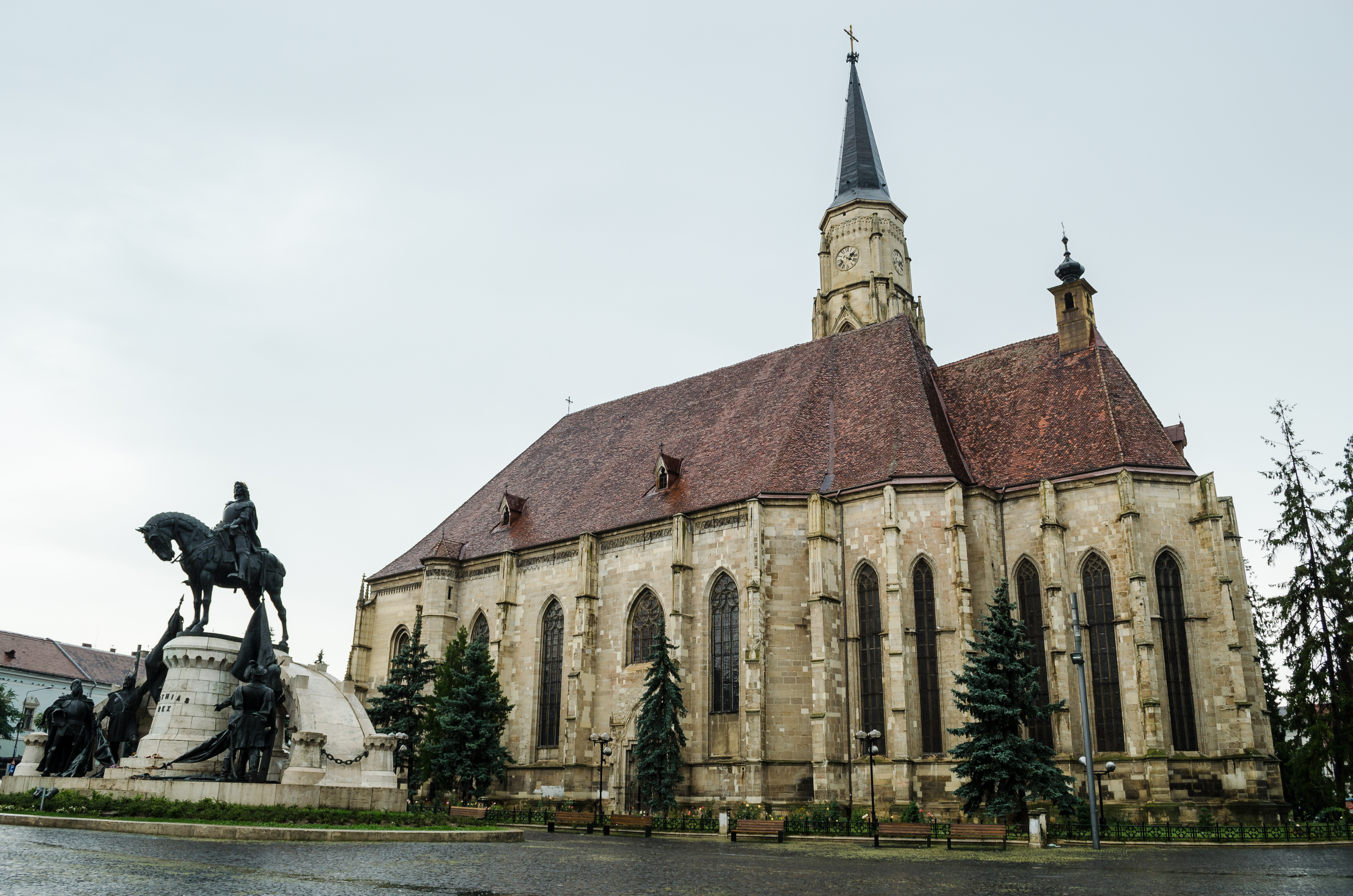
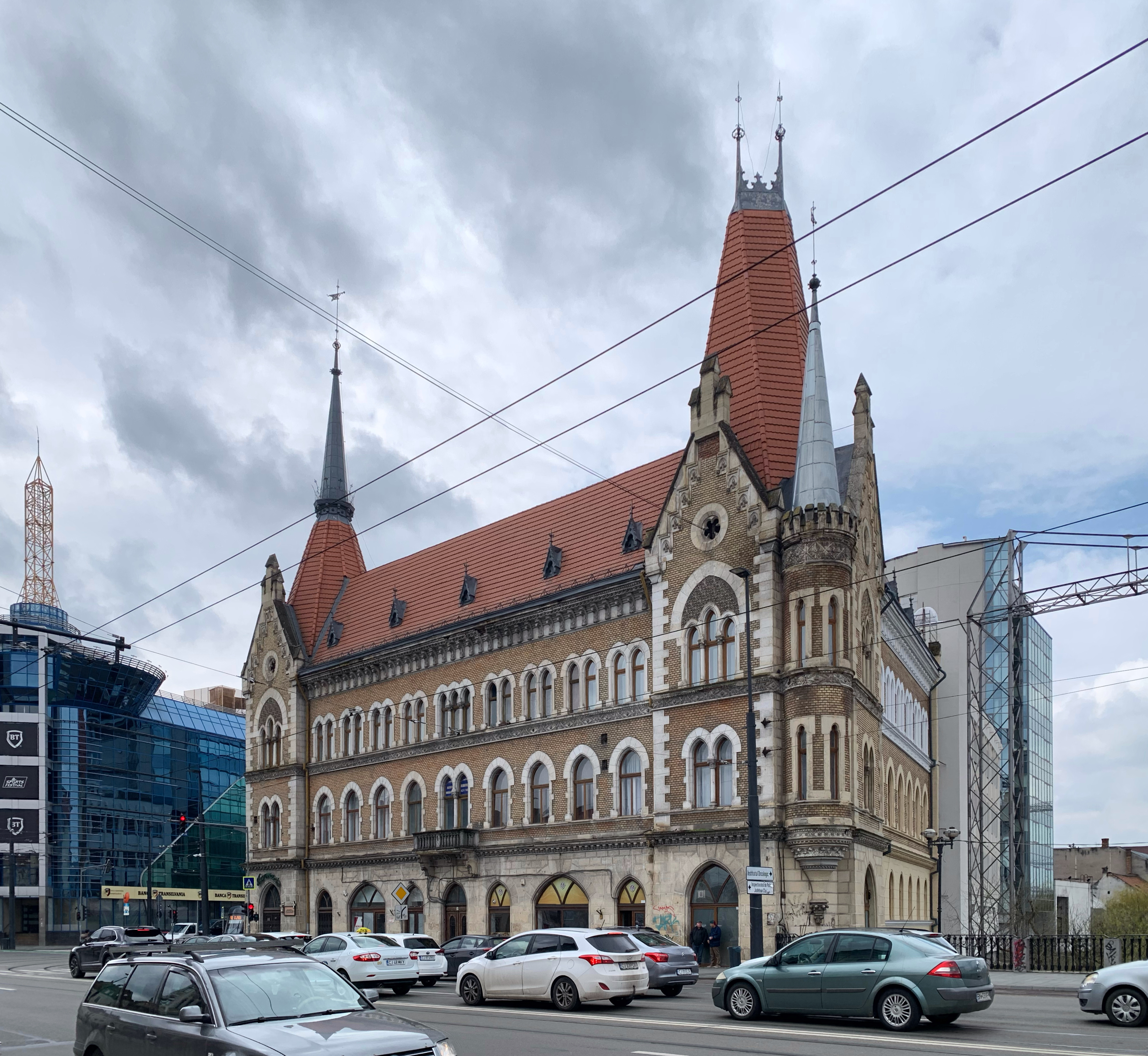
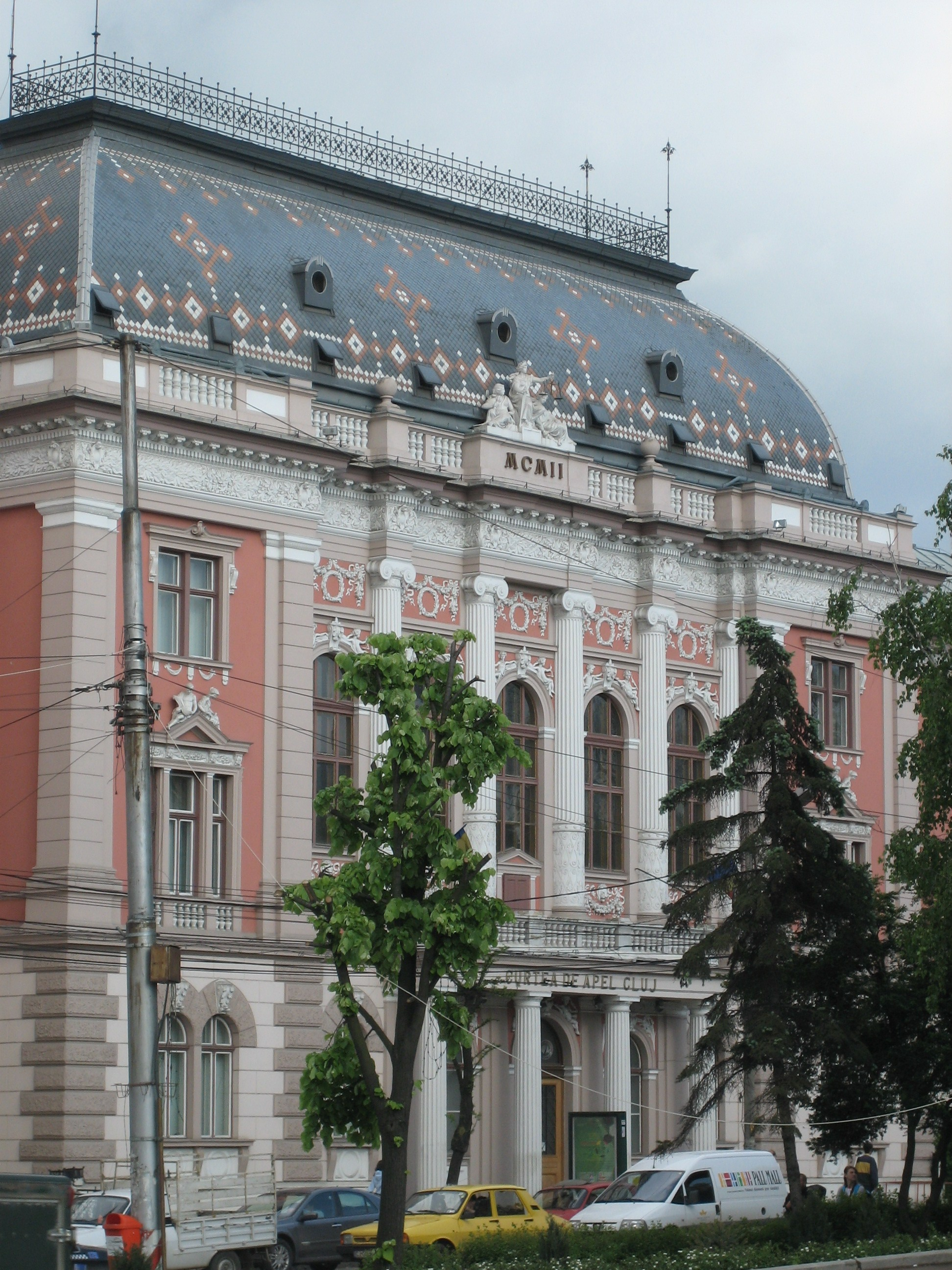
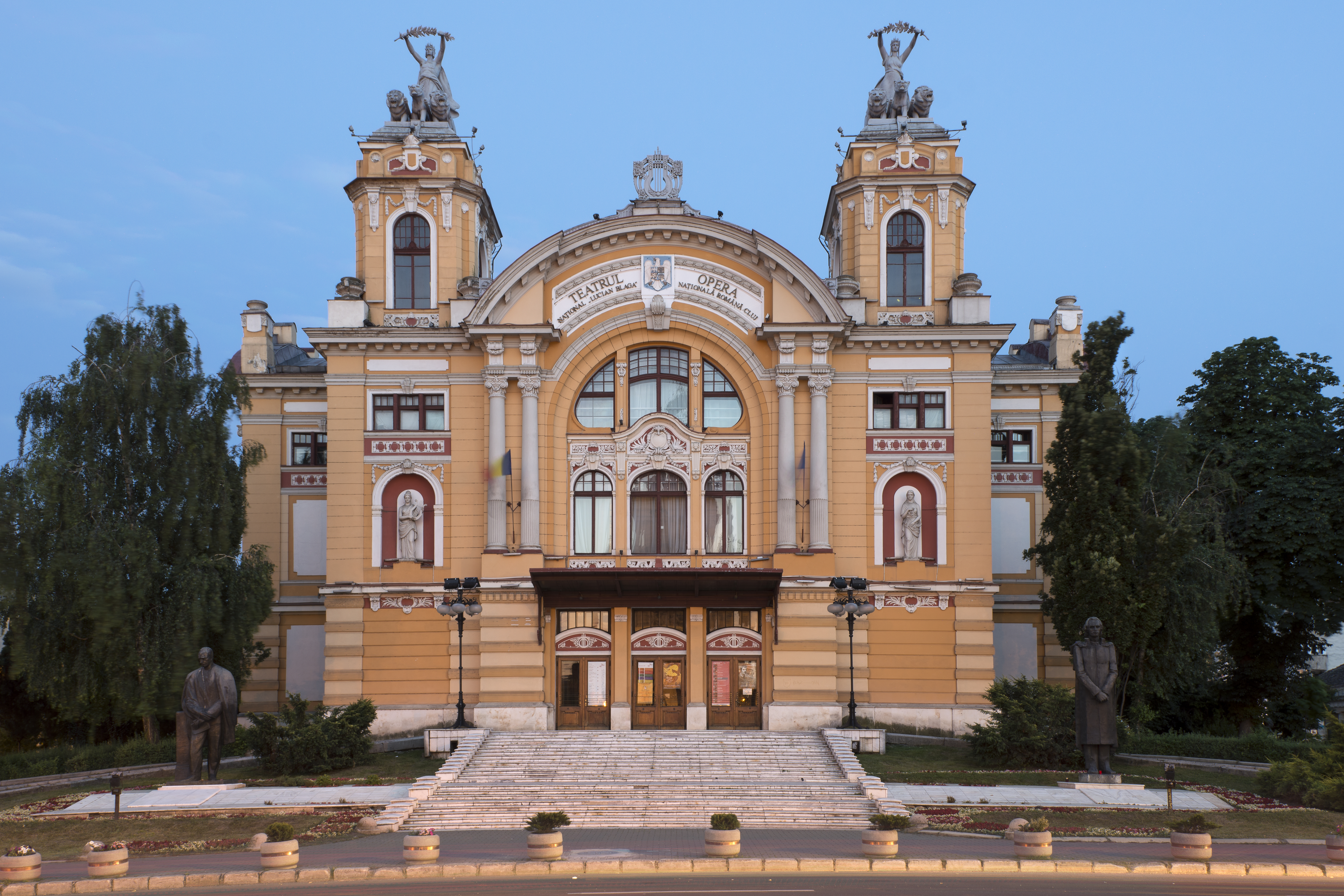
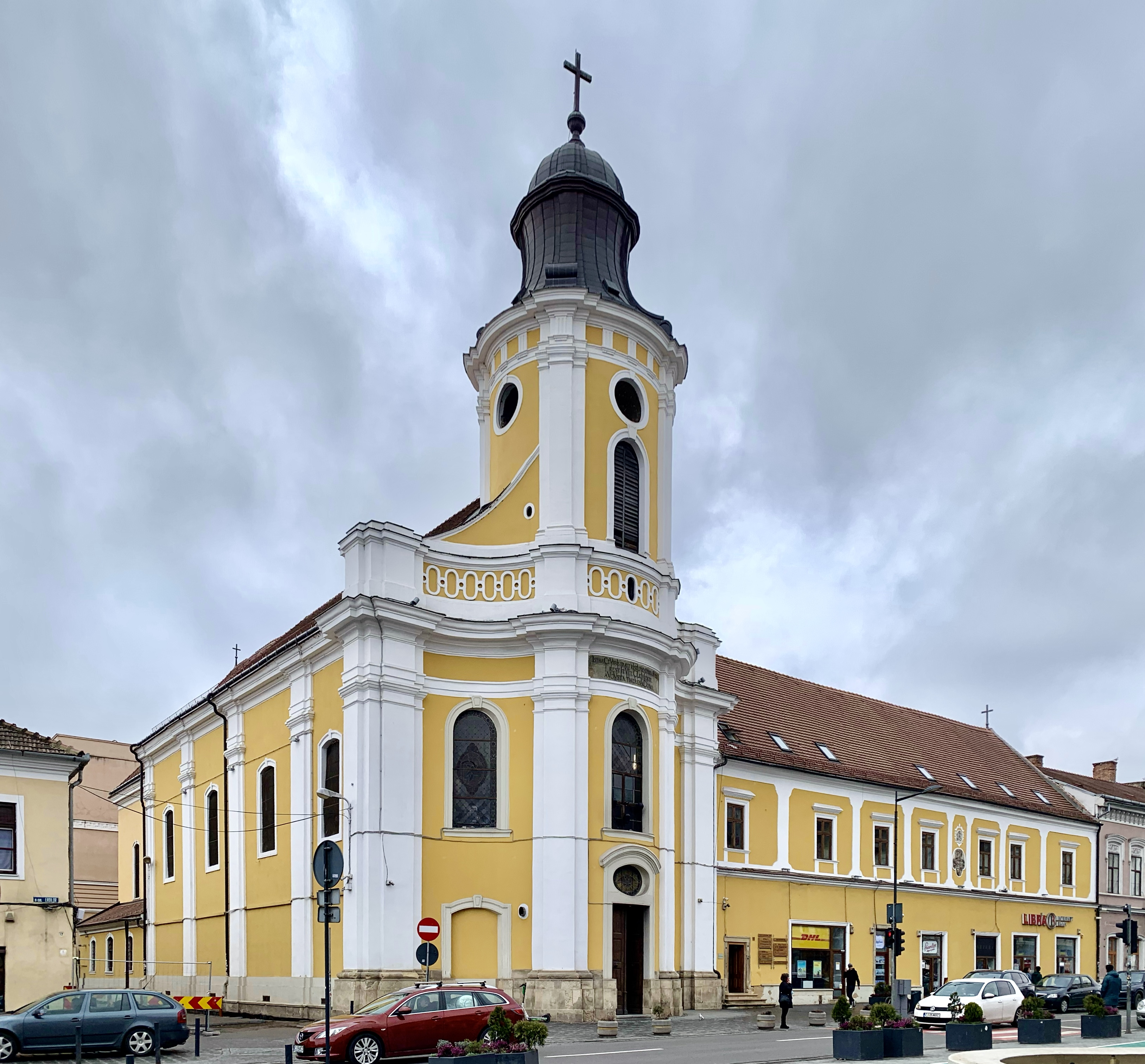
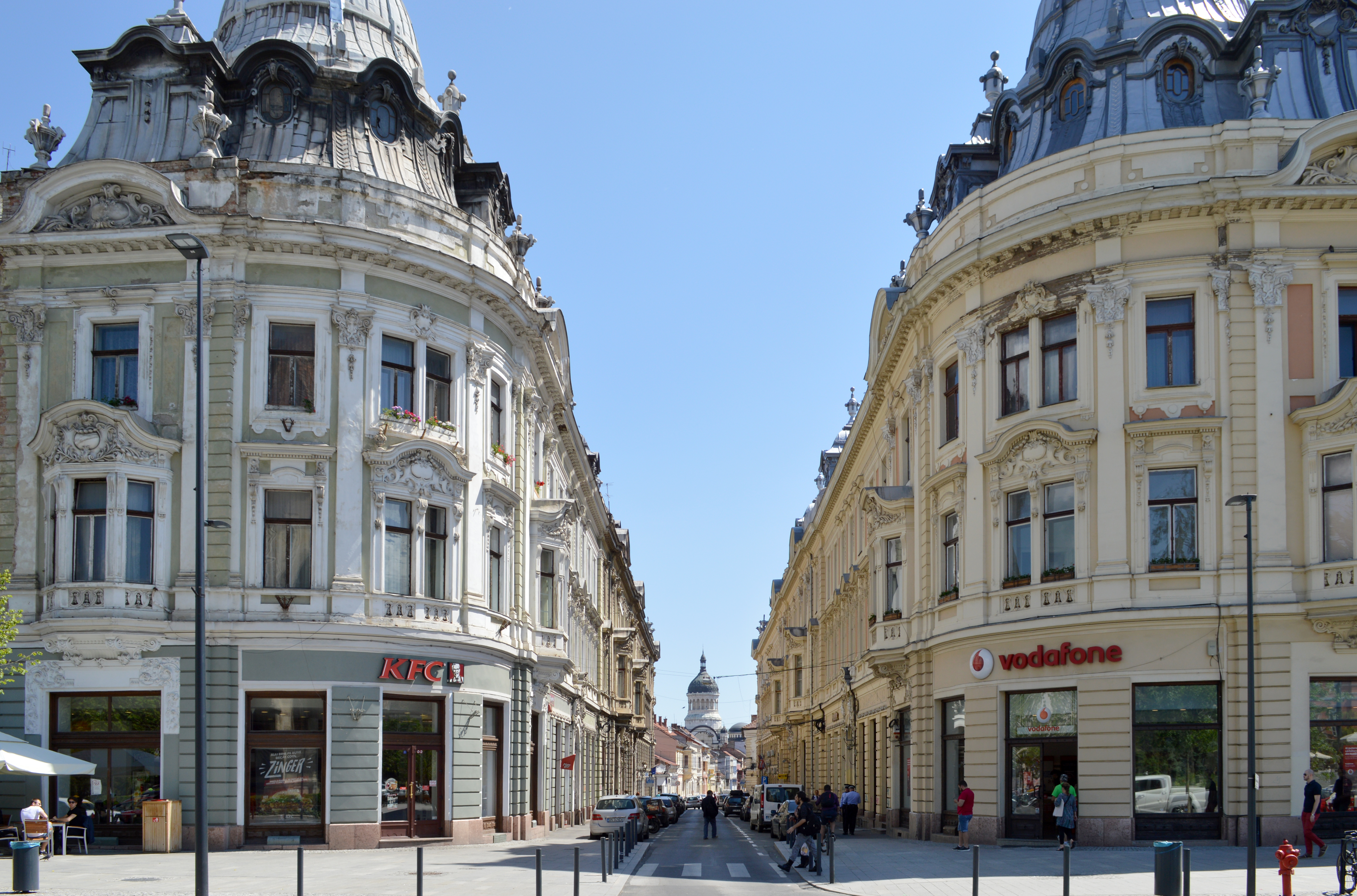
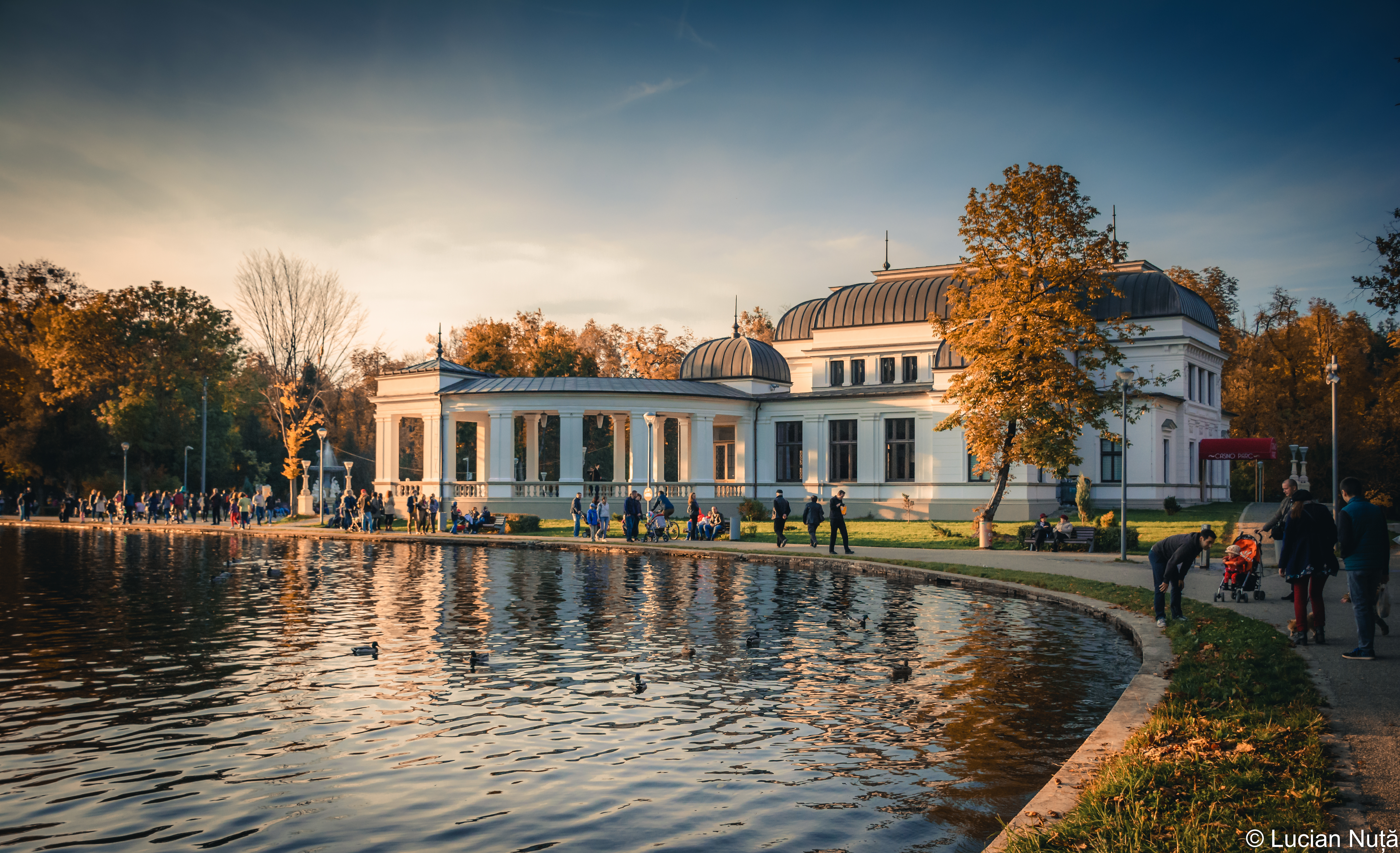
- Panorama St. Michael's Church Babeș-Bolyai University Matthias Corvinus House Széki Palace Palace of Justice Romanian National Opera Transfiguration Cathedral Iuliu Maniu Street Orthodox Cathedral Central Park

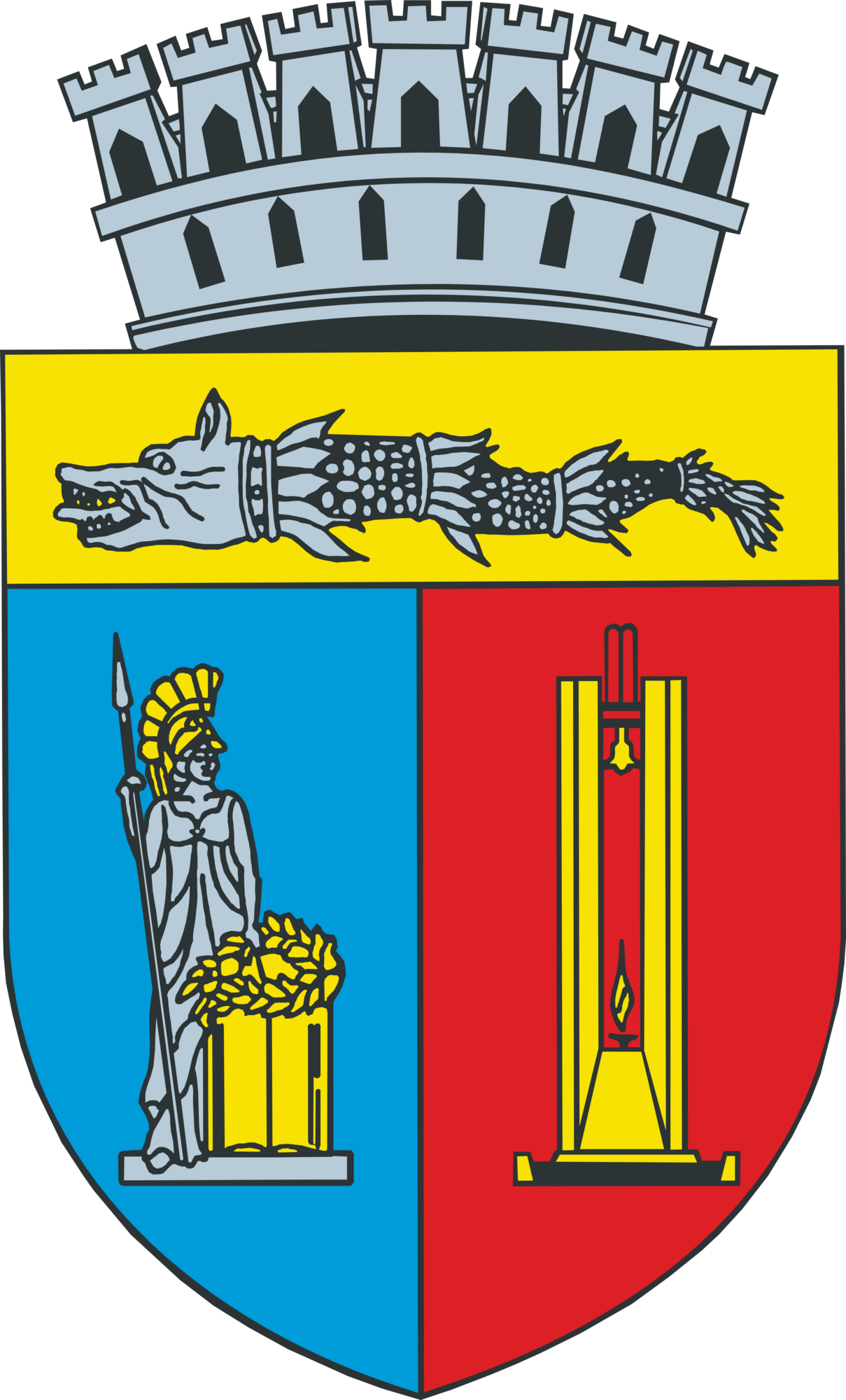
- Coat of arms
- Nickname: Treasure City (Romanian: Orașul Comoară; Hungarian: Kincses Város)
- Interactive map of Cluj-Napoca
- Location within Romania Cluj-Napoca (Europe)
- Coordinates: 46°46′N 23°35′E
- Country: Romania
- County: Cluj County
- Status: County seat
- Attested: 1213 (first official record as Clus)

Government
  - Mayor (2024–2028): Emil Boc (PNL)

Area
  - County Seat and Municipality: 179.5 km^{2} (69.3 sq mi)
  - Metro: 1,537.5 km^{2} (593.6 sq mi)
- Elevation: 340 m (1,120 ft)

Population (2021)
  - County Seat and Municipality: 286,598
  - Density: 1,597/km^{2} (4,140/sq mi)
  - Metro (2011): 411,379
- Time zone: UTC+2 (EET)
  - Summer (DST): UTC+3 (EEST)
- Postal Code: 400xyz (Note: x, y, and z are digits that indicate the street, part of the street, or even the building of the address)
- Area code: +40 x64 (Note: x is a digit indicating the operator: 2 for the former national operator, Romtelecom, and 3 for the other ground telephone networks)
- Car Plates: CJ (Note: used just on the plates of vehicles that operate only within the city limits (such as trolley buses, trams, utility vehicles, ATVs, etc.))
- Website: primariaclujnapoca.ro

Cluj-Napoca (/ˌkluːʒ.næ.ˈpoʊ.kə/, KLOOZH-na-POH-kə; Romanian: [ˈkluʒ naˈpoka]), or simply Cluj (Hungarian: Kolozsvár [ˈkoloʒvaːr]; German: Klausenburg), is a city in northwestern Romania. It is the second-most populous city in the country and the seat of Cluj County. Geographically, it is roughly equidistant from Bucharest (445 km; 277 mi), Budapest (461 km; 286 mi) and Belgrade (483 km; 300 mi). Located in the Someșul Mic river valley, the city is considered the unofficial capital of the historical province of Transylvania. For some decades prior to the Austro-Hungarian Compromise of 1867, it was the official capital of the Grand Principality of Transylvania.

As of 2021, 286,598 inhabitants lived in the city. The Cluj-Napoca metropolitan area had a population of 411,379 people, while the population of the peri-urban area is approximately 420,000. According to a 2007 estimate, the city hosted an average population of over 20,000 students and other non-residents each year from 2004 to 2007. The city spreads out from St. Michael's Church in Unirii Square, built in the 14th century and named after the Archangel Michael, Cluj's patron saint. The municipality covers an area of 179.52 square kilometres (69.31 sq mi).

Cluj experienced a decade of decline during the 1990s, its international reputation suffering from the policies of its mayor at the time, Gheorghe Funar. In the early 21st century, the city is one of the most important academic, cultural, industrial and business centres in Romania. Among other institutions, it hosts the country's largest university, Babeș-Bolyai University, with its botanical garden; nationally renowned cultural institutions such as the National Theatre and Opera; and the largest Romanian-owned commercial bank. Cluj-Napoca held the titles of European Youth Capital in 2015, and European City of Sport in 2018. In 2021, the city joined the UNESCO Creative Cities Network and was named a UNESCO City of Film.

== Etymology ==
=== Napoca ===
On the site of the city was a pre-Roman settlement named Napoca. After the AD 106 Roman conquest of the area, the place was known as Municipium Aelium Hadrianum Napoca. Possible etymologies for Napoca or Napuca include the names of some Dacian tribes such as the Naparis or Napaei, the Greek term napos (νάπος), meaning "timbered valley" or the Indo-European root *snā-p- (Pokorny 971–972), "to flow, to swim, damp".

=== Cluj ===
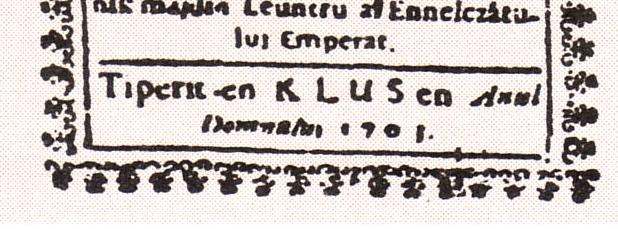
Romanian inscription of a religious book: "Printed in Klus in the year of our Lord 1703" (translated).

The first written mention of the city's current name – as a Royal Borough – was in 1213 under the Medieval Latin name Castrum Clus. Despite the fact that Clus as a county name was recorded in the 1173 document Thomas comes Clusiensis, it is believed that the county's designation derives from the name of the castrum, which might have existed prior to its first mention in 1213, and not vice versa. With respect to the name of this camp, there are several hypotheses about its origin. It may represent a derivation from the Latin term clausa – clusa, meaning "closed place", "strait", "ravine". Similar meanings are attributed to the Slavic term kluč, meaning "a key" and the German Klause – Kluse (meaning "mountain pass" or "weir"). The Latin and Slavic names have been attributed to the valley that narrows or closes between hills just to the west of Cluj-Mănăștur. An alternative proposal relates the name of the city to its first magistrate, Miklus – Miklós / Kolos.

The Hungarian form Kolozsvár, first recorded in 1246 as Kulusuar, underwent various phonetic changes over the years (uar / vár means "castle" in Hungarian); the variant Koloswar first appears in a document from 1332. Its Saxon name Clusenburg/Clusenbvrg appeared in 1348, but from 1408 the form Clausenburg was used. The Romanian name of the city used to be spelled alternately as Cluj or Cluș, the latter being the case in Mihai Eminescu's Poesis.

Other historical names for the city, all related to or derived from "Cluj" in different languages, include Latin Claudiopolis, Italian Clausemburgo, Turkish Kaloşvar and Yiddish קלויזנבורג Kloyznburg or קלאזין Klazin.

=== Current official name ===
Napoca, the pre-Roman and Roman name of ancient settlements in the area of the modern city, was added to the historical and modern name of Cluj during Nicolae Ceaușescu's national-communist dictatorship as part of his myth-making efforts. This happened in 1974, when the communist authorities made this nationalist gesture with the goal of emphasising the city's pre-Roman roots. The full name of "Cluj-Napoca" is rarely used outside of official contexts.

=== Nickname ===
The nickname "treasure city" was acquired in the late 16th century, and refers to the wealth amassed by residents, including in the precious metals trade. The phrase is orașul comoară in Romanian, given in Hungarian as kincses város.

== History ==
=== Roman Empire ===
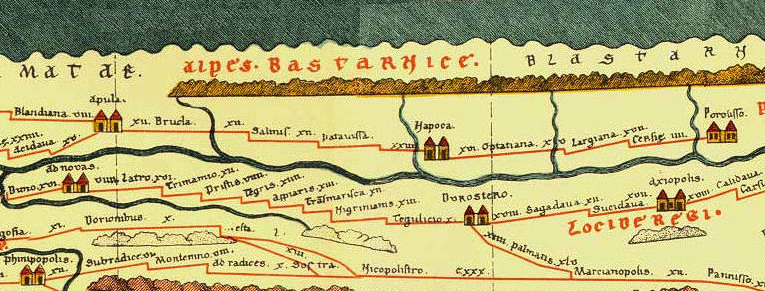
Napoca on the Roman Dacia fragment of the 1st–4th century AD Tabula Peutingeriana (upper centre)

The Roman Empire conquered Dacia in AD 101 and 106, during the rule of Trajan, and the Roman settlement Napoca, established about 106, is first recorded on a milestone discovered in 1758 in the vicinity of the city. Trajan's successor Hadrian granted Napoca the status of municipium as municipium Aelium Hadrianum Napocenses. Later, in the second century AD, the city gained the status of a colonia as Colonia Aurelia Napoca. Napoca became a provincial capital of Dacia Porolissensis and thus the seat of a procurator. The colonia was evacuated in 274 by the Romans. There are no references to urban settlement on the site for the better part of a millennium thereafter.

=== Middle Ages ===
Historical affiliations

Kingdom of Hungary 1000–1526
Eastern Hungarian Kingdom 1526–1570
Principality of Transylvania 1570–1804
Austrian Empire 1804–1867
Austria-Hungary 1867–1918 (de jure Hungary until 1920)
Kingdom of Romania 1920–1940 (de facto from 1918 to 1940)
(Kingdom of Hungary (1920–1946)) Kingdom of Hungary 1940–1945
Kingdom of Romania 1945–1947
Romanian People's Republic 1947–1965
Socialist Republic of Romania 1965–1989
Romania 1989–present

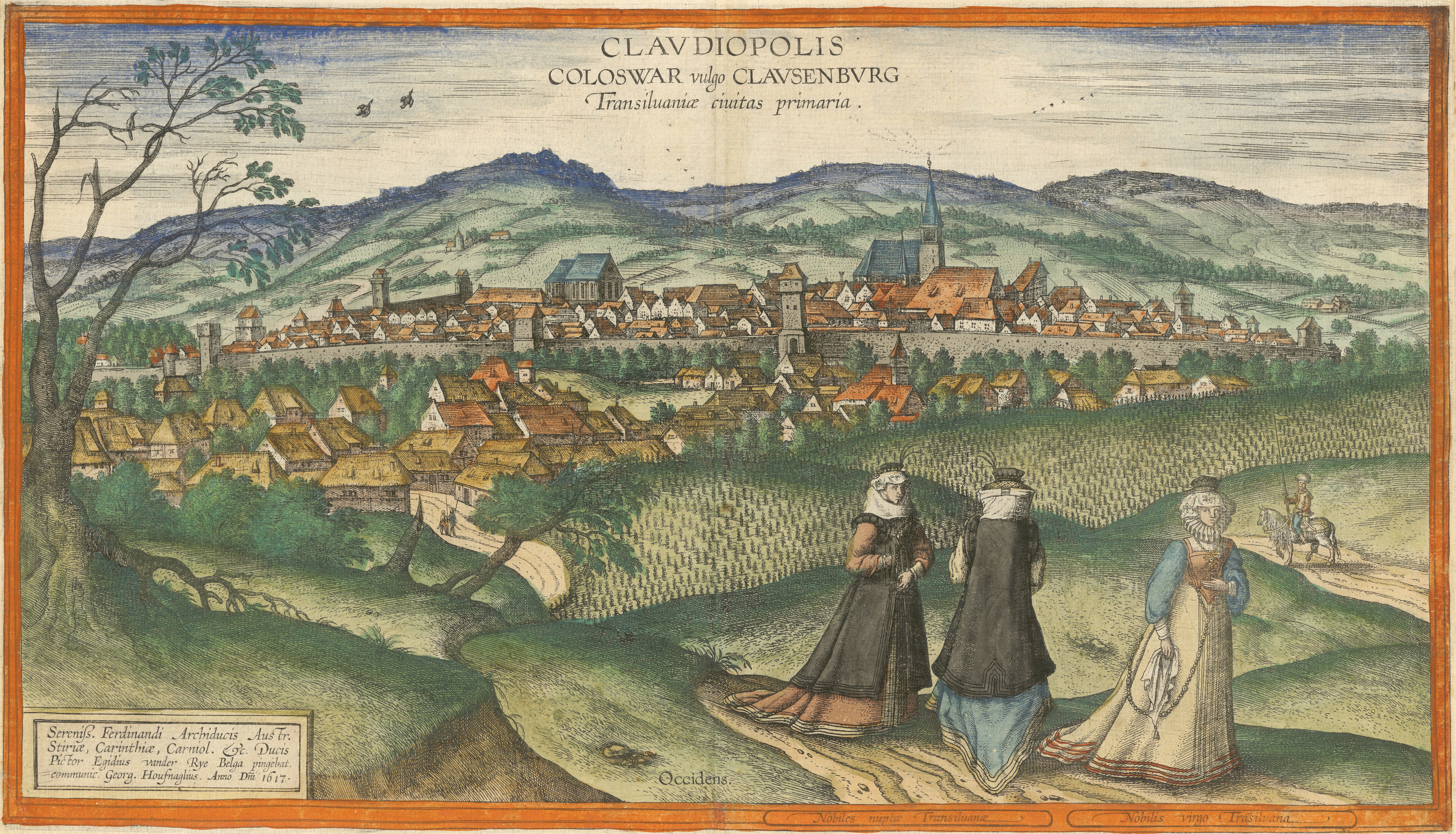
"Claudiopolis, Coloswar vulgo Clausenburg, Transilvaniæ civitas primaria". Gravure^{[a]} of Cluj by Georg Houfnagel (1617)

At the beginning of the Middle Ages, two groups of buildings existed on the current site of the city: the wooden fortress at Cluj-Mănăștur (Kolozsmonostor) and the civilian settlement developed around the current Piața Muzeului (Museum Place) in the city centre. Although the precise date of the conquest of Transylvania by the Hungarians is not known, the earliest Hungarian artifacts found in the region are dated to the first half of the tenth century. In any case, after that time, the city became part of the Kingdom of Hungary. King Stephen I made the city the seat of the castle county of Kolozs, and King Saint Ladislaus I of Hungary founded the abbey of Cluj-Mănăștur (Kolozsmonostor), destroyed during the Tatar invasions in 1241 and 1285. As for the civilian colony, a castle and a village were built to the northwest of the ancient Napoca no later than the late 12th century. This new village was settled by large groups of Transylvanian Saxons, encouraged during the reign of Crown Prince Stephen, Duke of Transylvania. The first reliable mention of the settlement dates from 1275, in a document of King Ladislaus IV of Hungary, when the village (Villa Kulusvar) was granted to the Bishop of Transylvania. On 19 August 1316, during the rule of the new king, Charles I of Hungary, Cluj was granted the status of a city (Latin: civitas), as a reward for the Saxons' contribution to the defeat of the rebellious Transylvanian voivode, Ladislaus Kán.

The couple buried together and known as the Lovers of Cluj-Napoca are believed to have lived between 1450 and 1550.

Many craft guilds were established in the second half of the 13th century, and a patrician stratum based in commerce and craft production displaced the older landed elite in the town's leadership. Through the privilege granted by Sigismund of Luxembourg in 1405, the city opted out from the jurisdiction of voivodes, vice-voivodes and royal judges, and obtained the right to elect a twelve-member jury every year. In 1488, King Matthias Corvinus (born in Kolozsvár in 1443) ordered that the centumvirate—the city council, consisting of one hundred men—be half composed from the homines bone conditiones (the wealthy people), with craftsmen supplying the other half; together they would elect the chief judge and the jury. Meanwhile, an agreement was reached providing that half of the representatives on this city council were to be drawn from the Hungarian, half from the Saxon population, and that judicial offices were to be held on a rotating basis. In 1541, Kolozsvár became part of the Eastern Hungarian Kingdom (that transformed to Principality of Transylvania in 1570) after the Ottoman Turks occupied the central part of the Kingdom of Hungary; a period of economic and cultural prosperity followed. Although Alba Iulia (Gyulafehérvár) served as a political capital for the princes of Transylvania, Cluj (Kolozsvár) enjoyed the support of the princes to a greater extent, thus establishing connections with the most important centres of Eastern Europe at that time, along with Košice (Kassa), Kraków, Prague and Vienna.

=== 16th–18th centuries ===
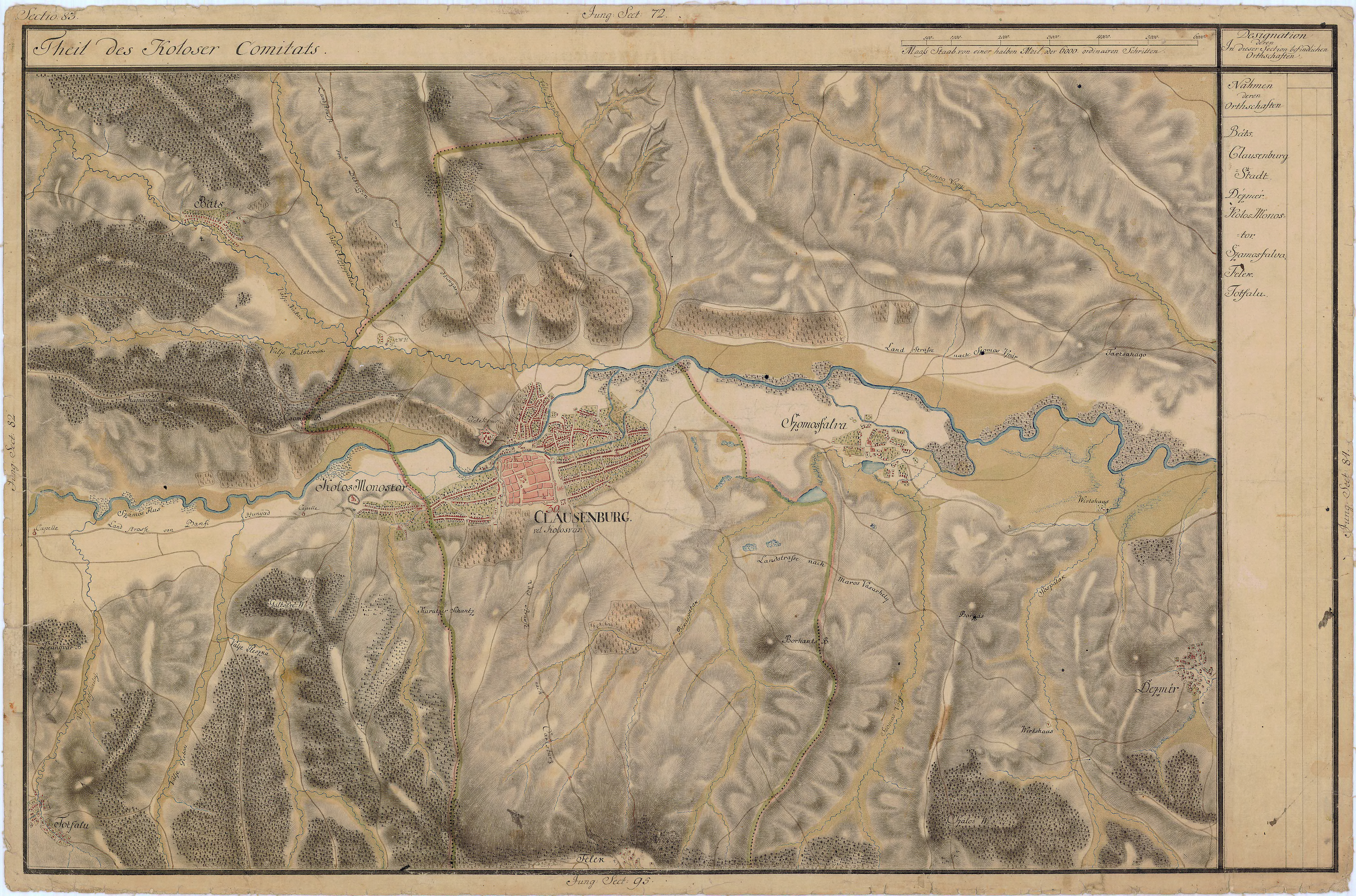
Clausenburg in the Grand Duchy of Transylvania maps, 1769–1773. Josephinische Landesaufnahme

In terms of religion, Protestant ideas first appeared in the middle of the 16th century. During Gáspár Heltai's service as preacher, Lutheranism grew in importance, as did the Swiss doctrine of Calvinism. By 1571, the Turda (Torda) Diet had adopted a more radical religion, Ferenc Dávid's Unitarianism, characterised by the free interpretation of the Bible and denial of the dogma of the Trinity. Stephen Báthory founded a Catholic Jesuit academy in the city in order to promote an anti-Reform movement; however, it did not have much success. For a year, in 1600–1601, Cluj became part of the personal union of Michael the Brave. Under the Treaty of Carlowitz in 1699, it became part of the Habsburg monarchy.

In the 17th century, Cluj suffered from great calamities, suffering from epidemics of the plague and devastating fires. By the end of the century, Turkish rule ended, but the city had lost much of its wealth, freedom, importance, and population. It gradually regained its important position within Transylvania as the headquarters of the Gubernium and the Diets between 1719 and 1732, and again from 1790 until the revolution of 1848, when the Gubernium moved to Nagyszeben (Hermannstadt), present-day Sibiu). In 1791, a group of Romanian intellectuals drew up a petition, known as the Supplex Libellus Valachorum, which was sent to the emperor in Vienna. The petition demanded equality for the Romanian nation in Transylvania with the other nations (Saxon, Szekler, and Hungarian) governed by the Unio Trium Nationum, but it was rejected by the Diet of Cluj.

=== 19th century ===
Beginning in 1830, the city became the centre of the Hungarian national movement within the principality. This erupted with the Hungarian Revolution of 1848. The Austrian commander Karl von Urban took control of the city on 18 November 1848, following a battle. Subsequently, the Hungarian army, led by the Polish general Józef Bem, launched an offensive into Transylvania and recaptured the city by Christmas 1848.

After the 1848 revolution, an absolutist regime was established, followed by a liberal government that came to power in 1860. During this latter period, equal rights were granted to ethnic Romanians, but only briefly. In 1865, the Diet in Cluj abolished the laws voted in Sibiu (Nagyszeben/Hermannstadt), and proclaimed the 1848 Law concerning the Union of Transylvania with Hungary. A modern university was founded in 1872, with the intention of promoting the integration of Transylvania into Hungary. Before 1918, the city's only Romanian-language schools were two church-run elementary schools, and the first printed Romanian periodical did not appear until 1903.

After the Austro-Hungarian Compromise of 1867, the city and all of Transylvania were once again incorporated into the Kingdom of Hungary. During this time, Kolozsvár/Cluj was among the largest and most important cities of the kingdom and was the seat of Kolozs County. Ethnic Romanians in Transylvania suffered oppression and persecution. Their grievances found expression in the Transylvanian Memorandum, a petition sent in 1892 by the political leaders of Transylvania's Romanians to the Austro-Hungarian Emperor-King Franz Joseph. It asked for equal rights with the Hungarians and demanded an end to persecutions and attempts at Magyarisation. The Emperor forwarded the memorandum to Budapest—the Hungarian capital. The authors, among them Ioan Rațiu and Iuliu Coroianu, were arrested, tried and sentenced to prison for "high treason" in Kolozsvár/Cluj in May 1894. During the trial, approximately 20,000 people who had come to Cluj demonstrated on the streets of the city in support of the defendants. A year later, the King gave them pardon upon the advice of his Hungarian prime minister, Dezső Bánffy. In 1897, the Hungarian government decided that only Hungarian place names should be used and prohibited the use of the German or Romanian versions of the city's name on official government documents.

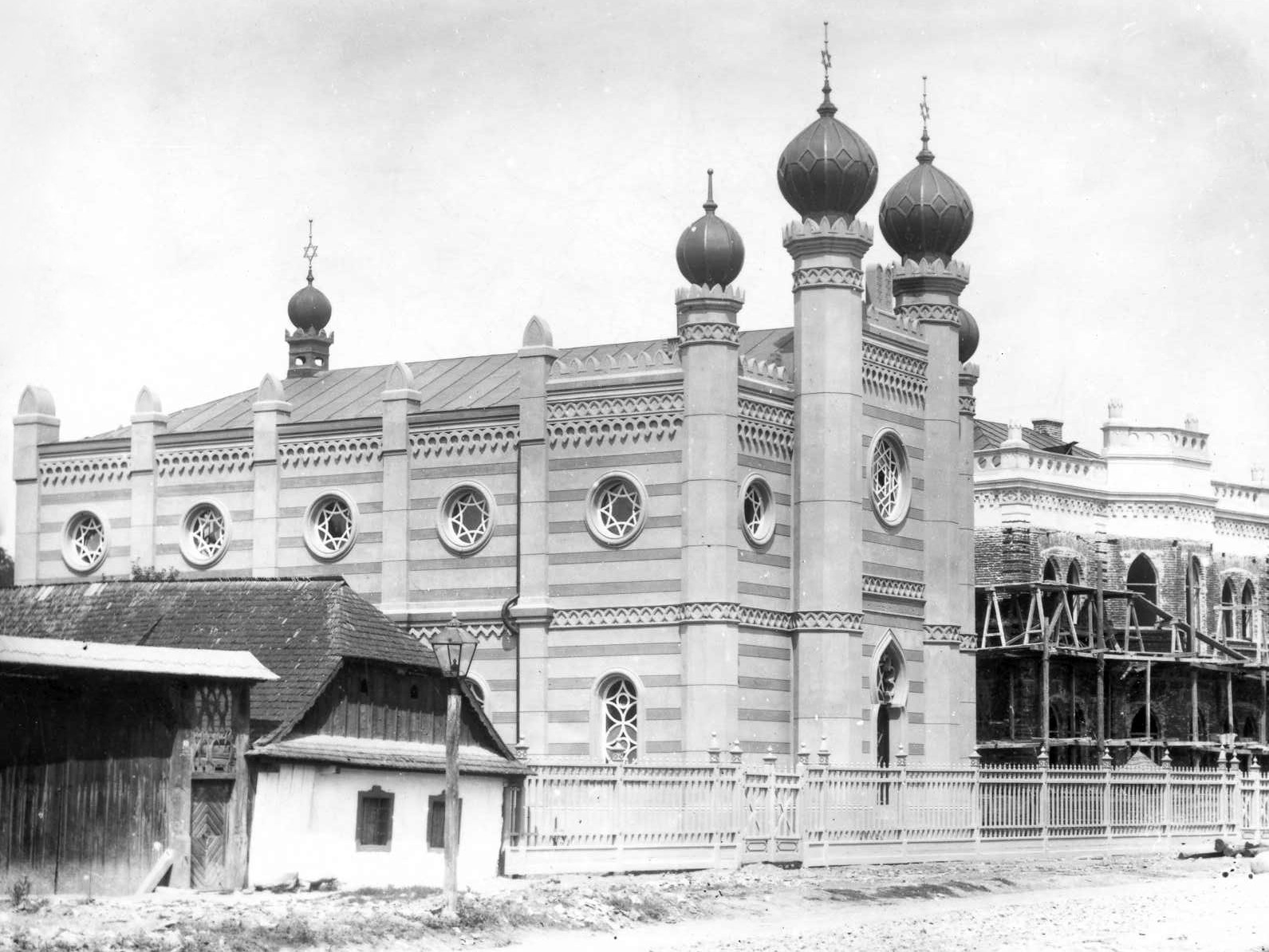
Neolog Synagogue and Jewish school at the beginning of the 20th century

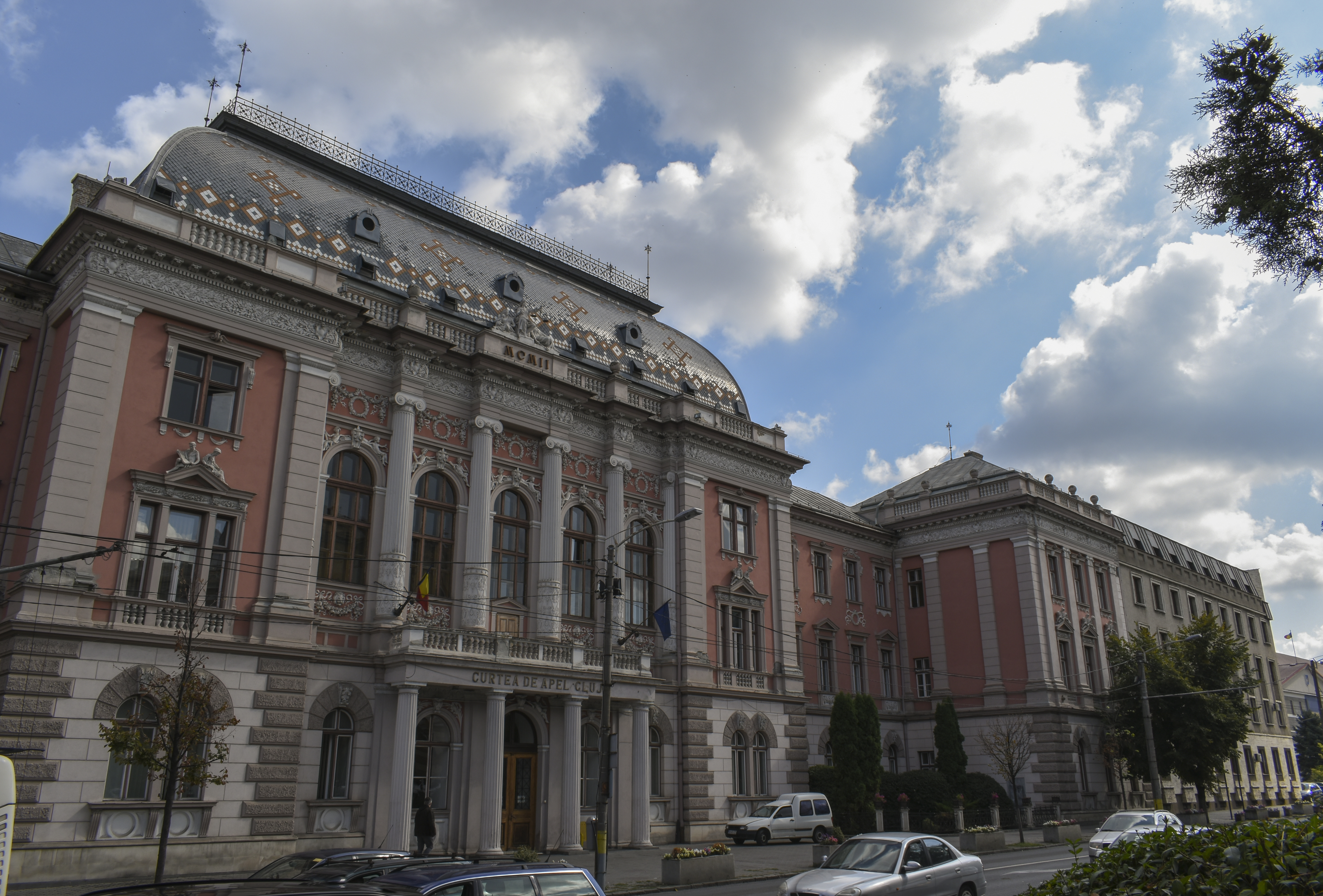
The Palace of Justice

=== 20th century ===
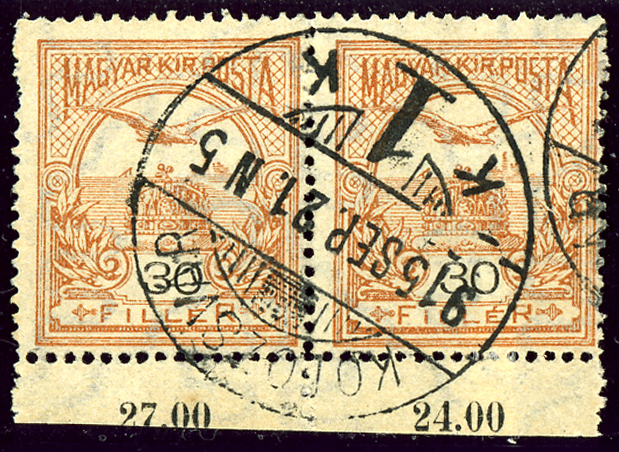
Pair of Hungarian postage stamps cancelled at Kolozsvár in 1915

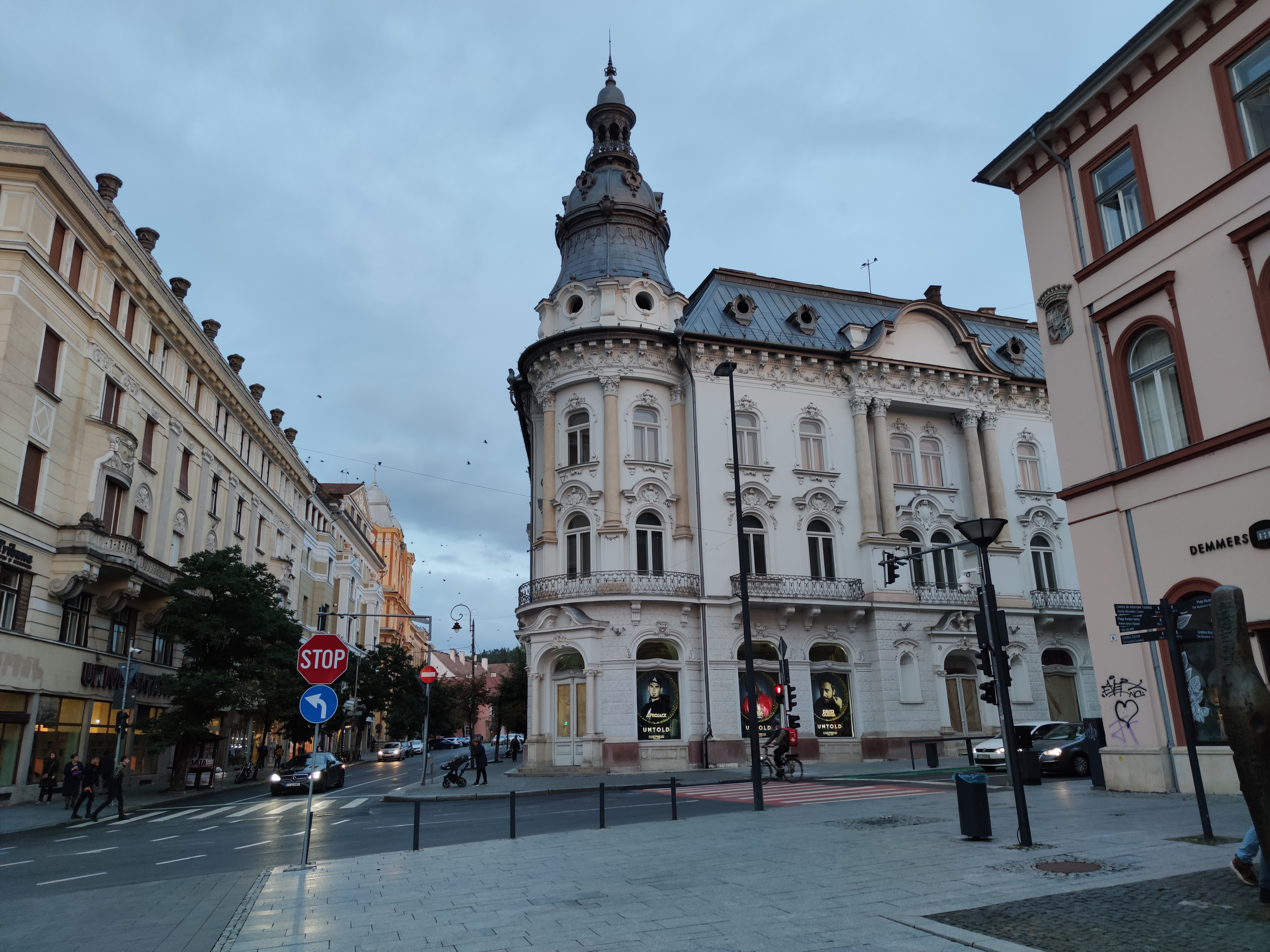
The New York Palace, nowadays the Continental Hotel

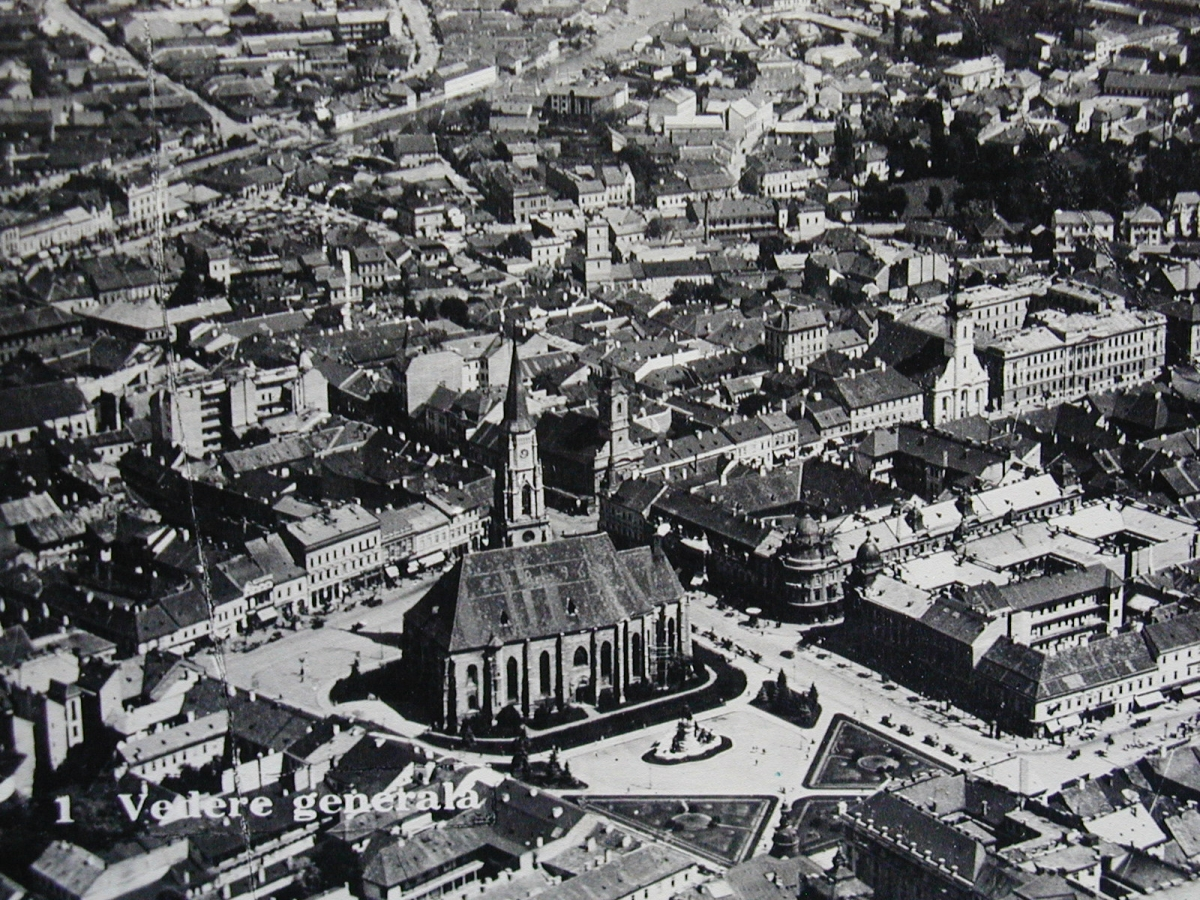
Central Cluj in 1930

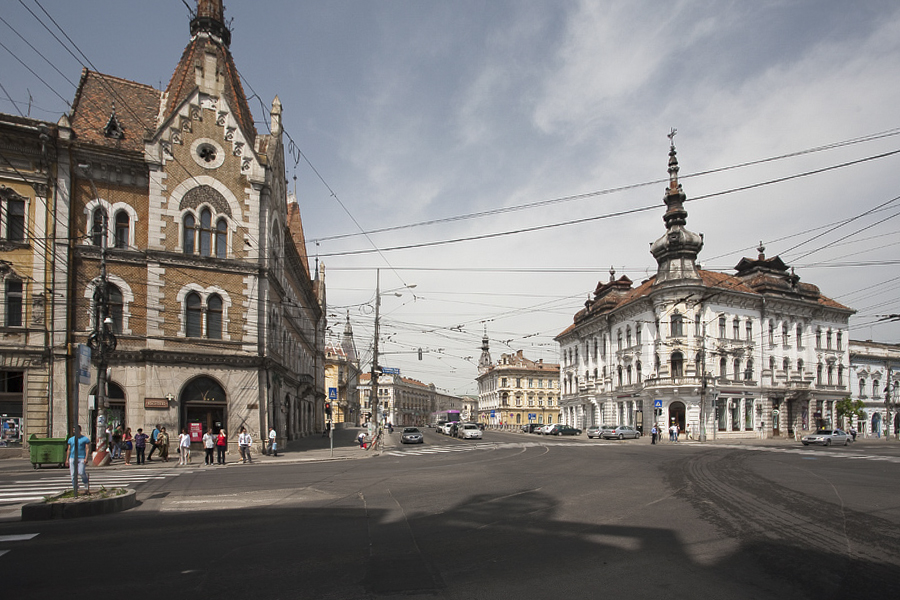
King Ferdinand Street

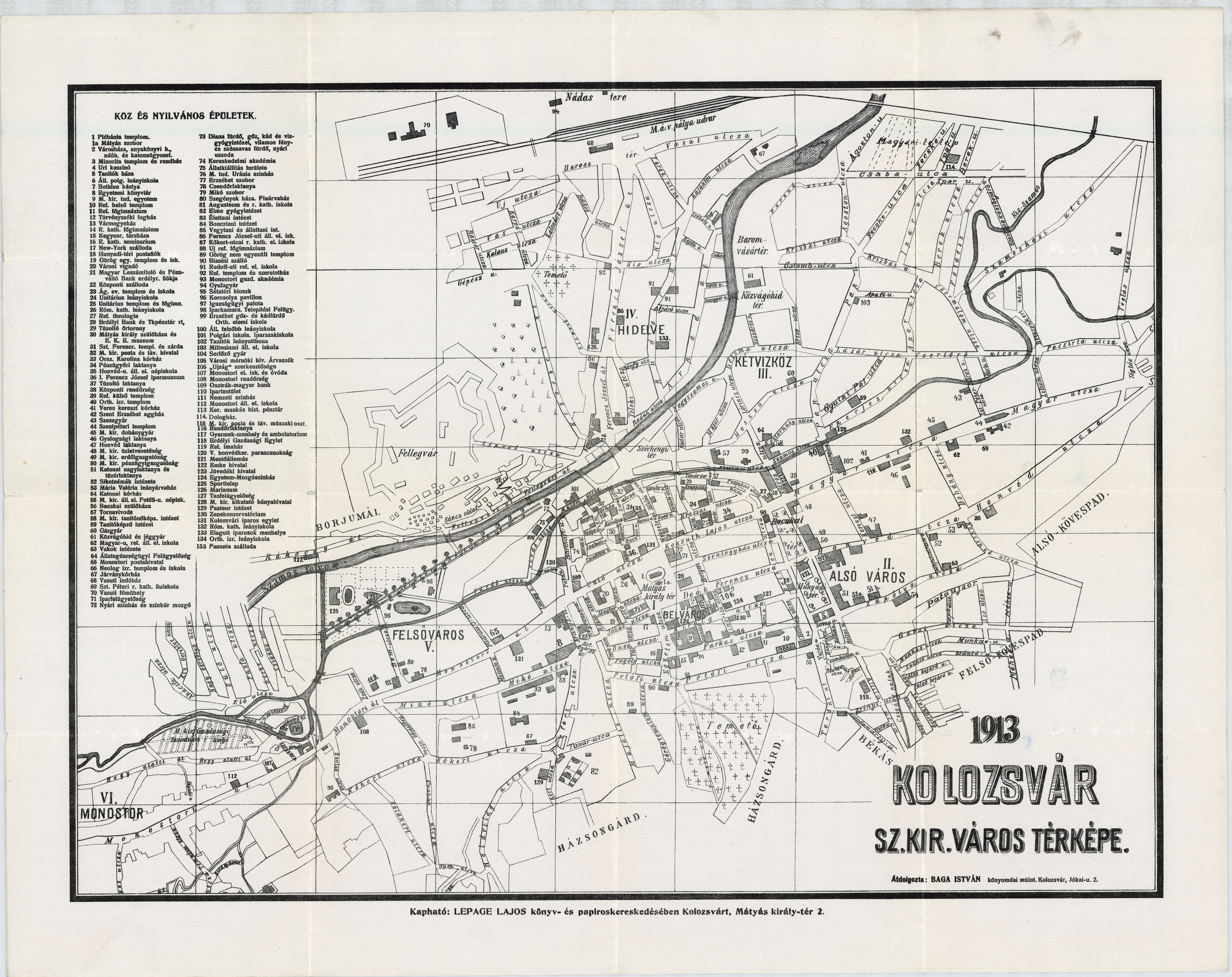
City plan of Kolozsvár, 1913

In the autumn of 1918, as World War I neared its end, Cluj became a centre of revolutionary activity, headed by Amos Frâncu. On 28 October 1918, Frâncu called for the organisation of the "union of all Romanians". Thirty-nine delegates were elected from Cluj to attend the proclamation of the union of Transylvania with the Kingdom of Romania in the Great National Assembly of Alba Iulia on 1 December 1918; the transfer of sovereignty was formalised by the Treaty of Trianon in June 1920. The interwar years saw the new authorities embark on a "Romanianisation" campaign: a Capitoline Wolf statue donated by Rome was set up in 1921; in 1932 a plaque written by historian Nicolae Iorga was placed on Matthias Corvinus's statue, emphasising his Romanian paternal ancestry; and construction of an imposing Orthodox cathedral began, in a city where only about a tenth of the inhabitants belonged to the Orthodox state church. This endeavour had only mixed results: by 1939, Hungarians still dominated local economic and (to a certain extent) cultural life: for instance, Cluj had five Hungarian daily newspapers and just one in Romanian.

In 1940, Cluj, along with the rest of Northern Transylvania, became part of Miklós Horthy's Hungary through the Second Vienna Award arbitrated by Nazi Germany and Fascist Italy, as Romania drew closer to the Axis powers. After the Germans occupied Hungary in March 1944 and installed a puppet government under Döme Sztójay, they forced large-scale antisemitic measures in the city. The headquarters of the local Gestapo were located in the New York Hotel. That May, the authorities began the relocation of the Jews to the Iris ghetto. Liquidation of the 16,148 captured Jews occurred through six deportations to Auschwitz in May–June 1944. Despite facing severe sanctions from the Hungarian administration, some Jews escaped across the border to Romania, with the assistance of intellectuals such as Emil Hațieganu, Raoul Șorban, Aurel Socol and Dezső Miskolczy, as well as various peasants from Mănăștur.

On 11 October 1944 the city was captured by Romanian and Soviet troops. It was formally restored to the Kingdom of Romania by the Treaty of Paris in 1947. On 24 January, 6 March and 10 May 1946, the Romanian students, who had come back to Cluj after the restoration of northern Transylvania, rose against the claims of autonomy made by nostalgic Hungarians and the new way of life imposed by the Soviets, resulting in clashes and street fights.

The Hungarian Revolution of 1956 produced a powerful echo within the city; there was a real possibility that demonstrations by students sympathising with their peers across the border could escalate into an uprising. The protests provided the Romanian authorities with a pretext to speed up the process of "unification" of the local Babeș (Romanian) and Bolyai (Hungarian) universities, allegedly contemplated before the 1956 events. Hungarians remained the majority of the city's population until the 1960s. Then Romanians began to outnumber Hungarians, due to the population increase as a result of the government's forced industrialisation of the city and new jobs. During the Communist period, the city recorded a high industrial development, as well as enforced construction expansion. On 16 October 1974, when the city celebrated 1850 years since its first mention as Napoca, the Communist government changed the name of the city by adding "Napoca" to it.

=== 1989 revolution and after ===
During the Romanian Revolution of 1989, Cluj-Napoca was one of the scenes of the rebellion: 26 were killed and approximately 170 injured. After the end of totalitarian rule, the nationalist politician Gheorghe Funar became mayor and governed for the next 12 years. His tenure was marked by strong Romanian nationalism and acts of ethnic provocation against the Hungarian-speaking minority. This deterred foreign investment; however, in June 2004, Gheorghe Funar was voted out of office, and the city entered a period of rapid economic growth. From 2004 to 2009, the mayor was Emil Boc, concurrently president of the Democratic Liberal Party. He went on to be elected as prime minister, returning as mayor in 2012.

== Geography ==
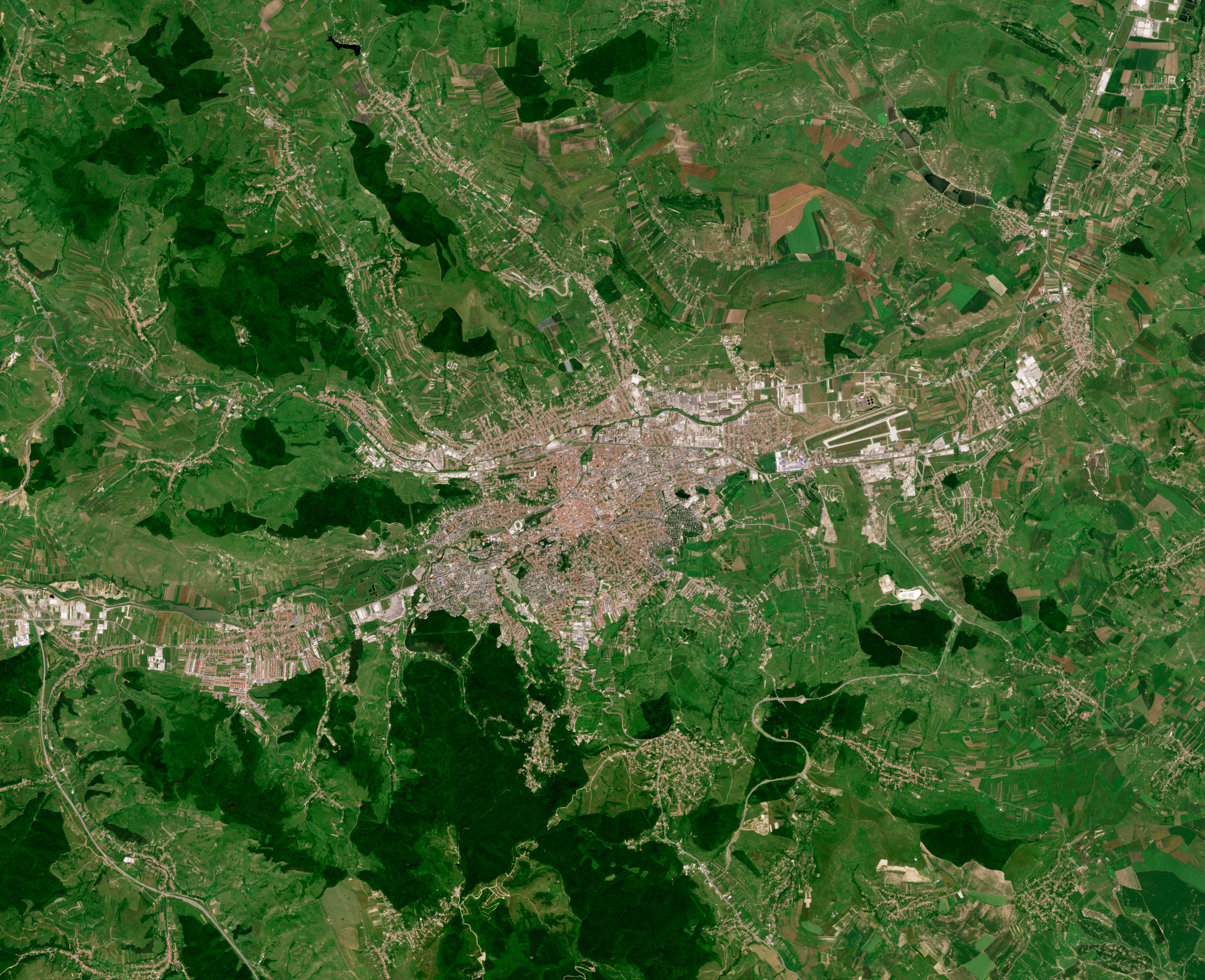
Satellite image of Cluj-Napoca

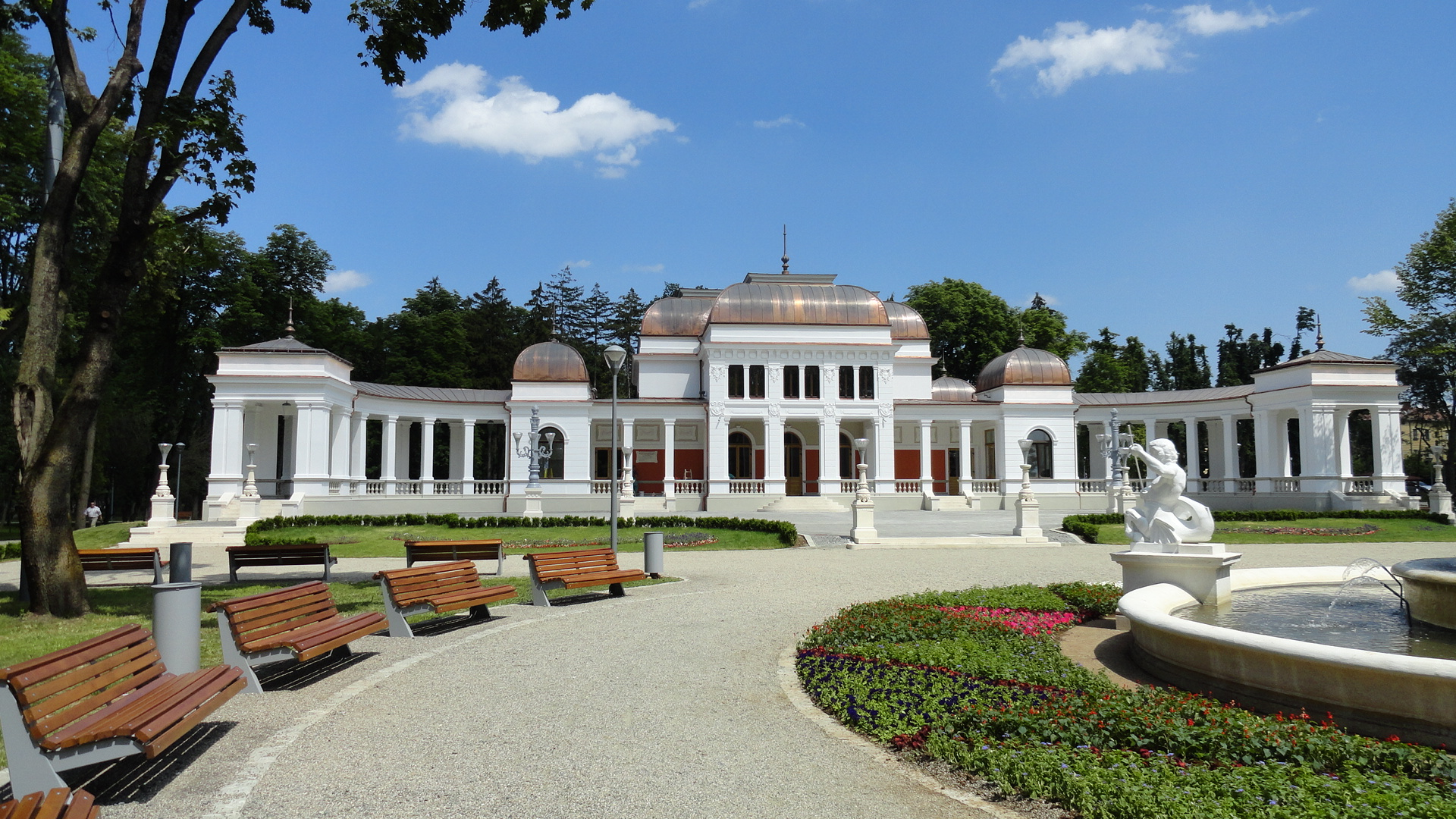
Old casino in the Central Park

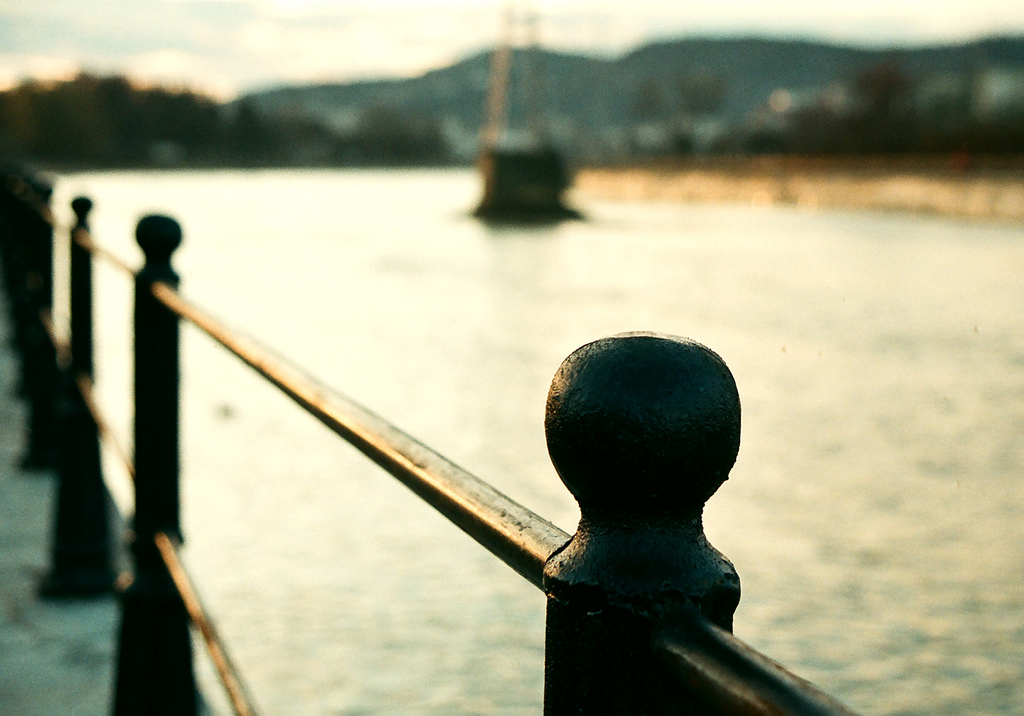
The banks of the Someșul Mic

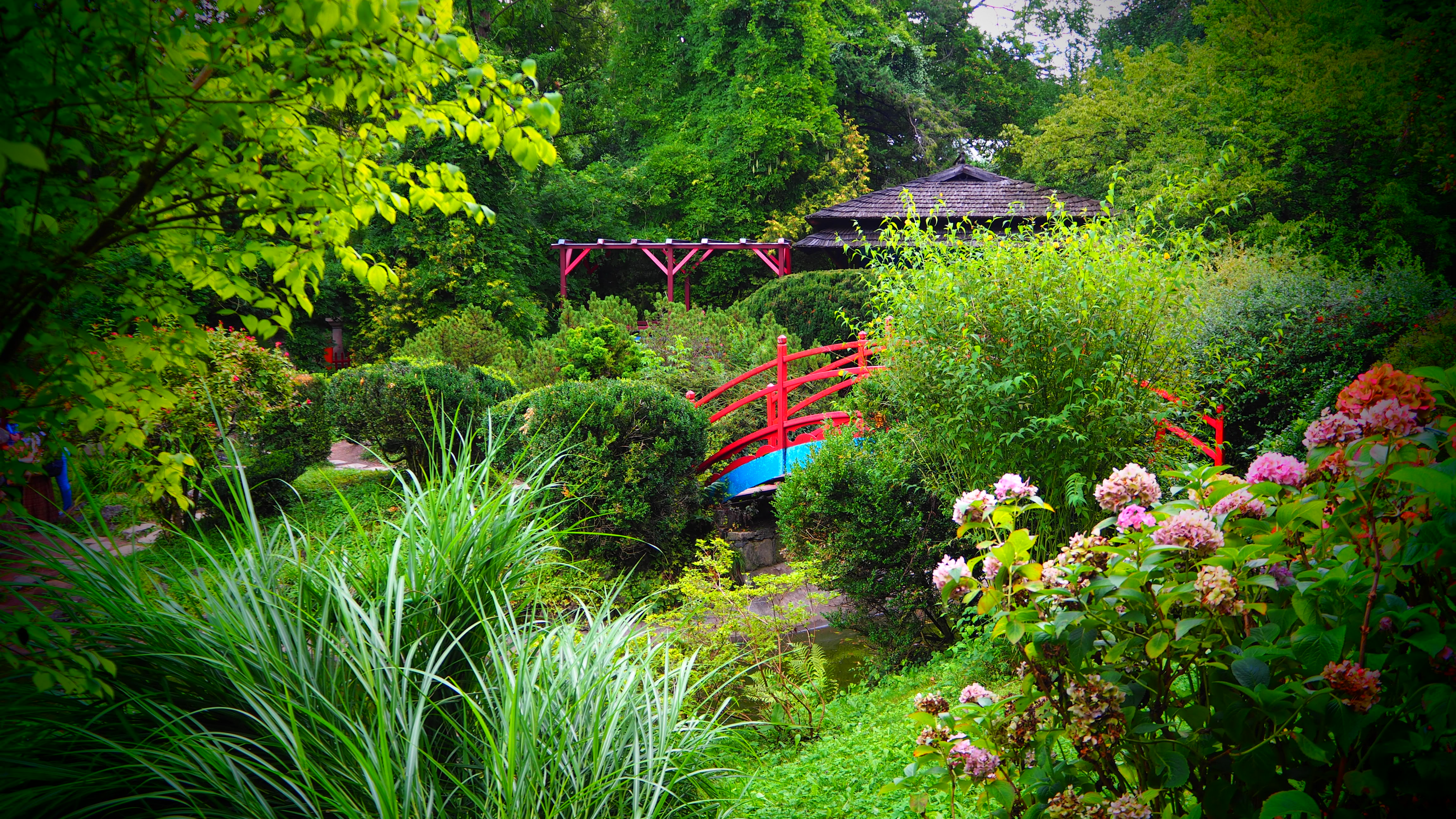
The Japanese garden within the local botanical garden

Cluj-Napoca, located in the central part of Transylvania, has a surface area of 179.5 square kilometres (69.3 sq mi). The city lies at the confluence of the Apuseni Mountains, the Someș plateau and the Transylvanian plain. It sprawls over the valleys of Someșul Mic and Nadăș, and, to some extent over the secondary valleys of the Popești, Chintău, Borhanci and Popii rivers. The southern part of the city occupies the upper terrace of the northern slope of Feleac Hill, and is surrounded on three sides by hills or mountains with heights between 500 metres (1,600 ft) and 700 metres (2,300 ft). The Someș plateau is situated to the east, while the northern part of town includes Dealurile Clujului ("the Hills of Cluj"), with the peaks, Lombului (684 m (2,244 ft)), Dealul Melcului (617 m (2,024 ft)), Techintău (633 m (2,077 ft)), Hoia (506 m (1,660 ft)) and Gârbău (570 m (1,870 ft)). Other hills are located in the western districts, and the hills of Calvaria and Cetățuia (Belvedere) are located near the centre of city.

Built on the banks of the river Someșul Mic, the city is also crossed over by brooks or streams such as Pârâul Țiganilor, Pârâul Popești, Pârâul Nădășel, Pârâul Chintenilor, Pârâul Becaș, Pârâul Murătorii; Canalul Morilor runs through the centre of town.

A wide variety of flora grow in the Cluj-Napoca Botanical Garden; some animals have also found refuge there. The city has a number of other parks, of which the largest is the Central Park. This park was founded during the 19th century and includes an artificial lake with an island, as well as the largest casino in the city, Chios. Other notable parks in the city are the Iuliu Hațieganu Park of the Babeș-Bolyai University, which features some sport facilities, the Hașdeu Park, within the eponymous student housing district, the high-elevation Cetățuia, and the Opera Park, behind the building of the Cluj-Napoca Romanian Opera.

=== Surroundings ===
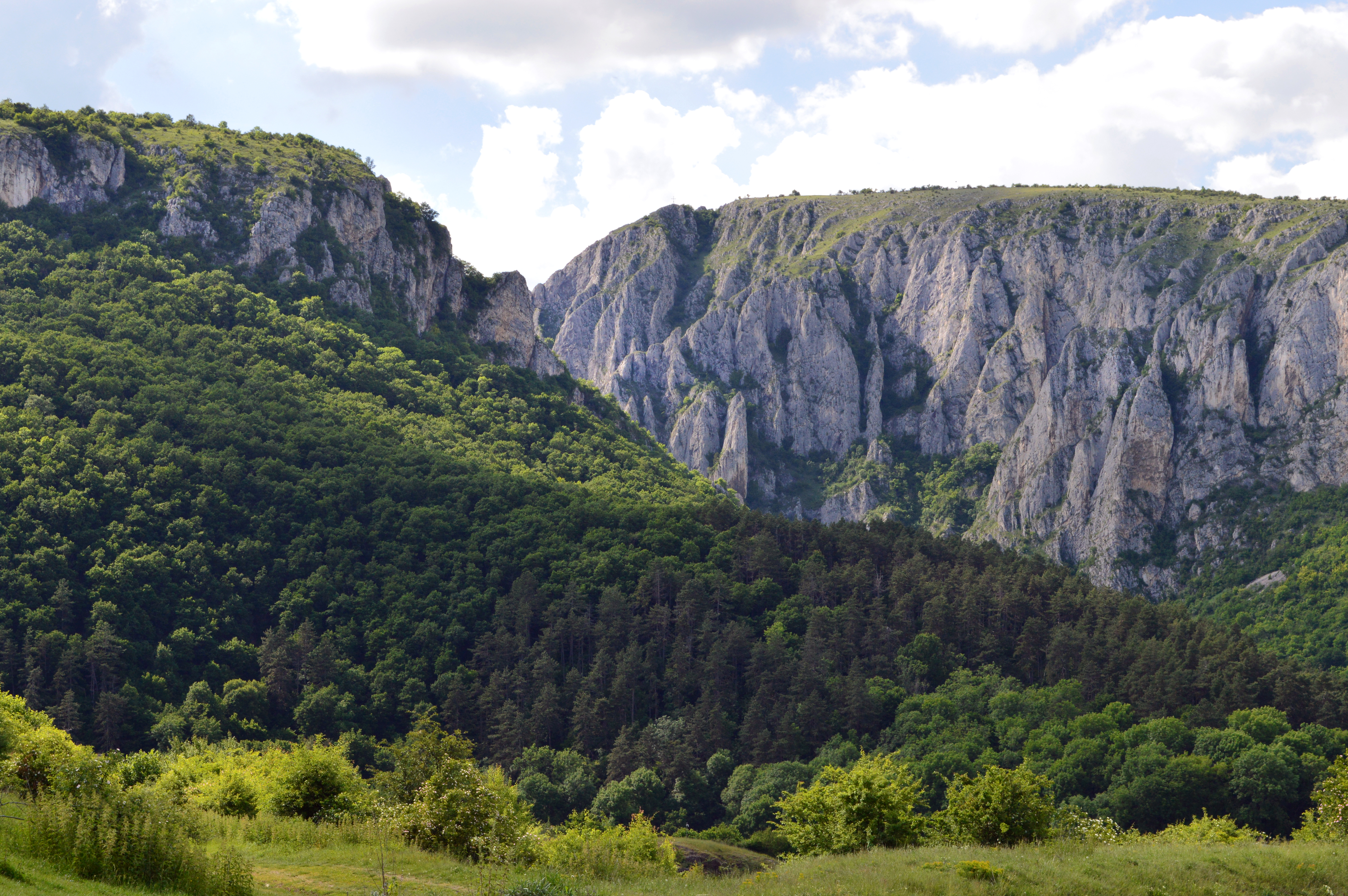
Turda Gorges (south-east of Cluj) seen from the west end

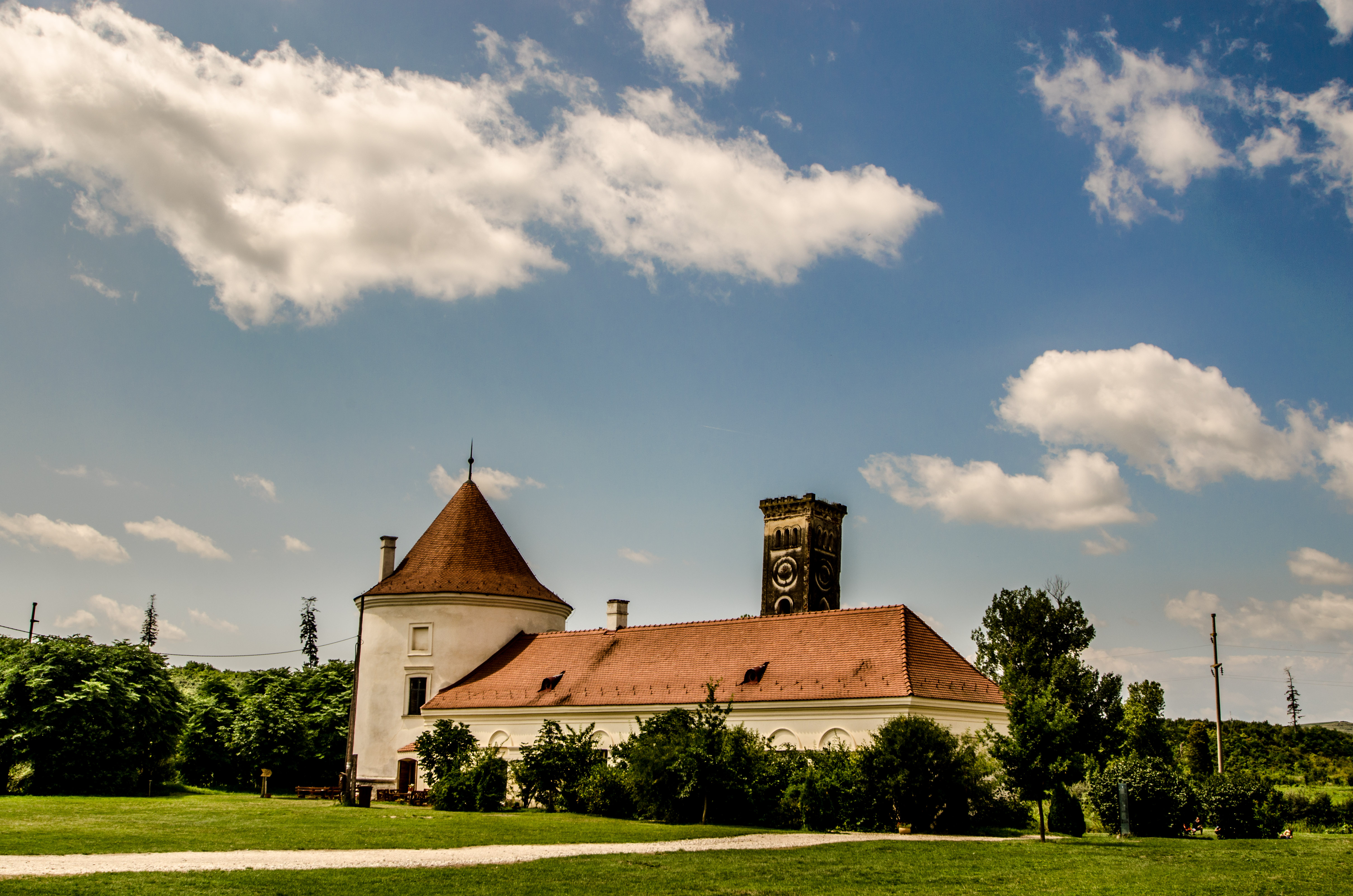
Bánffy Castle (north-east of Cluj) is currently being restored.

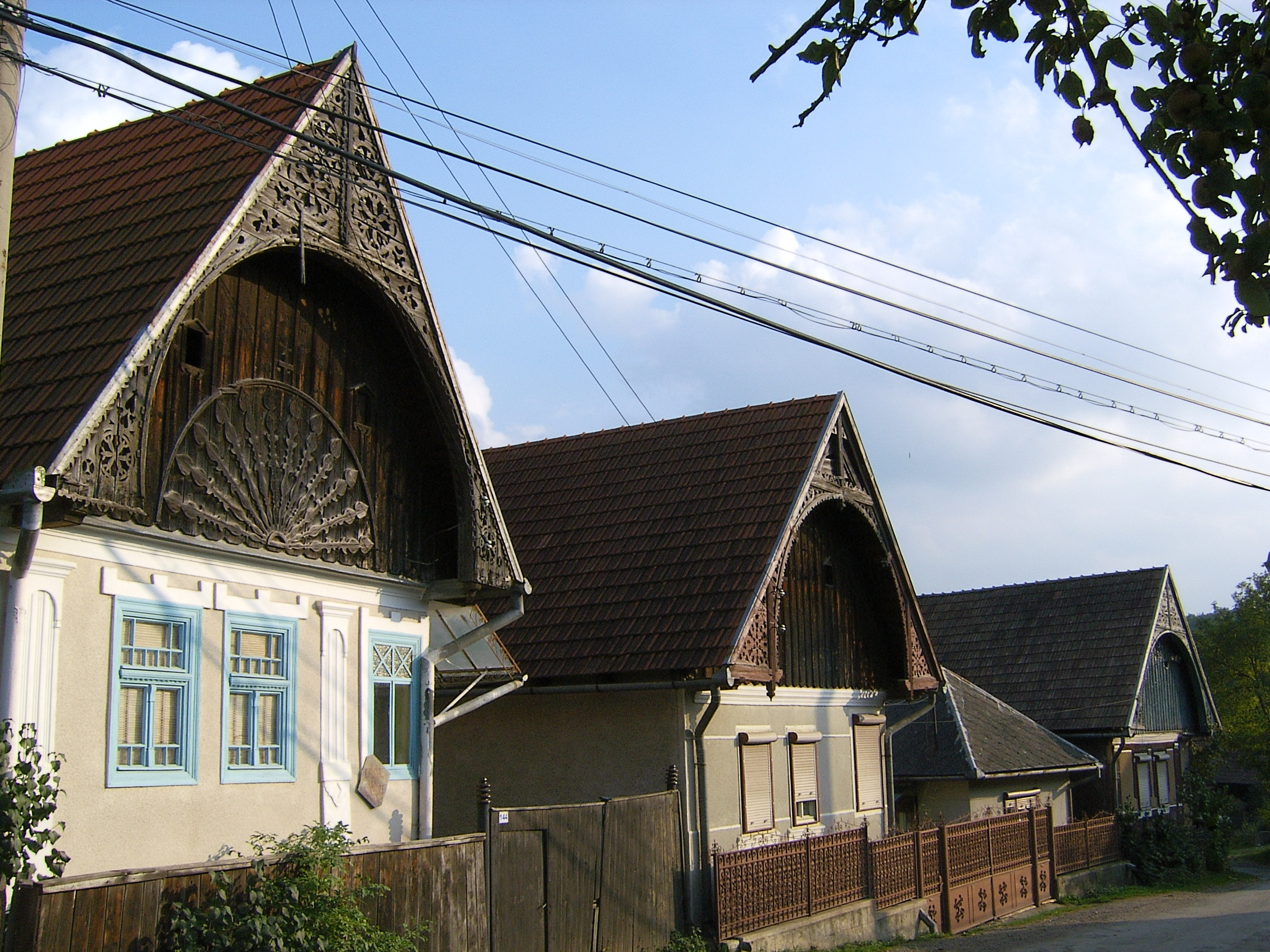
Typical rural houses in Mănăstireni, west of Cluj.

The city is surrounded by forests and grasslands. Rare species of plants, such as Venus's slipper and iris, are found in the two botanical reservations of Cluj-Napoca, Fânațele Clujului and Rezervația Valea Morii ("Mill Valley Reservation"). Animals such as boars, badgers, foxes, rabbits and squirrels live in nearby forest areas such as Făget and Hoia. The latter forest hosts the Romulus Vuia ethnographical park, with exhibits dating back to 1678. Various people report alien encounters in the Hoia-Baciu forest, large networks of catacombs that connect the old churches of the city, or the presence of a monster in the nearby lake of Tarnița.

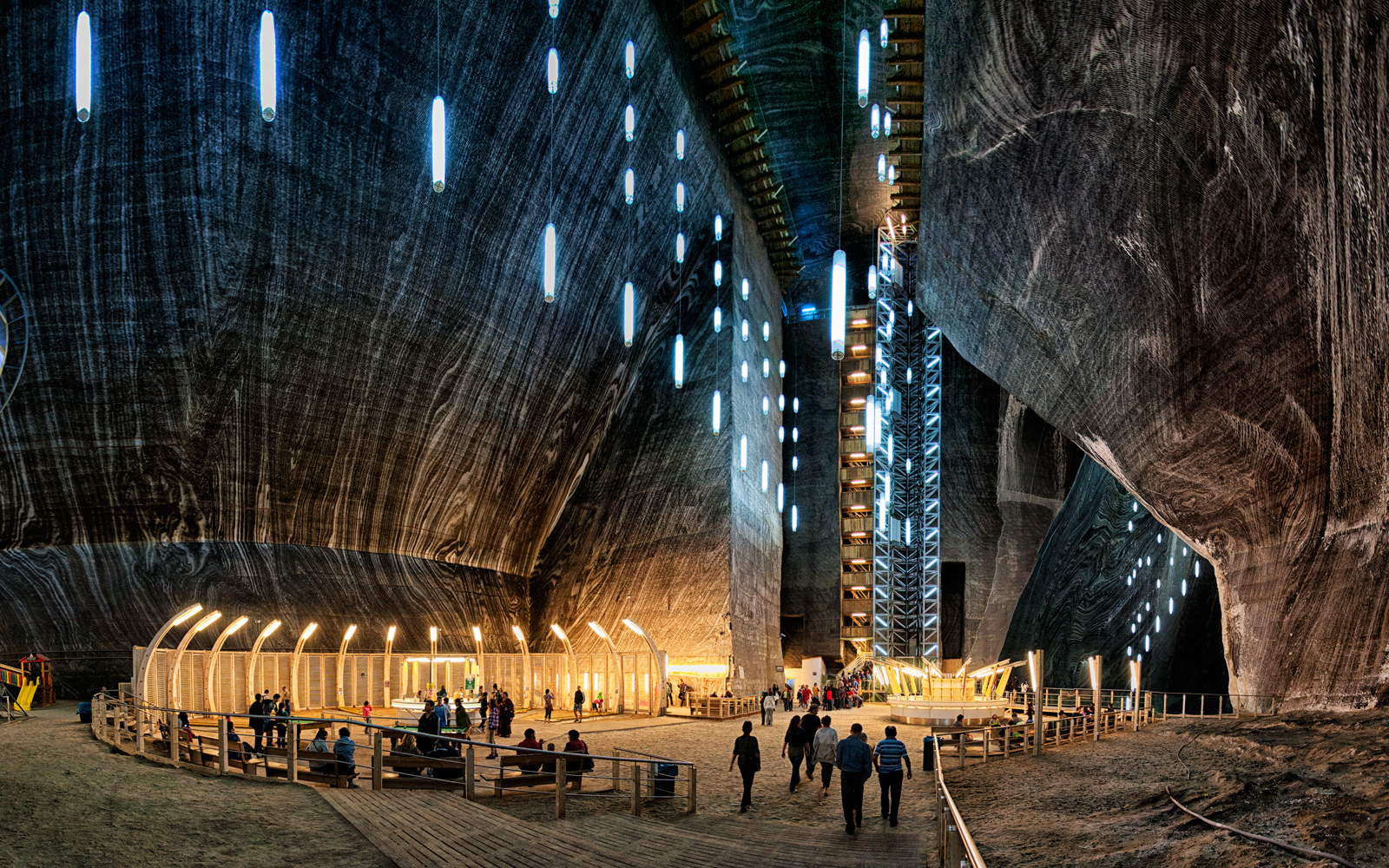
Main gallery of Salina Turda

A modern, 750-metre (820 yd)-long ski resort sits on Feleac Hill, with an altitude difference of 98 metres (107 yd) between its highest and lowest points. This ski resort offers outdoor lighting, artificial snow and a ski tow. Băișoara winter resort is located approximately 50 kilometres (31 mi) from the city of Cluj-Napoca, and includes two ski trails, for beginner and advanced skiers, respectively: Zidul Mic and Zidul Mare. Two other summer resorts/spas are included in the metropolitan area, namely Cojocna and Someșeni Baths.

There are a large number of castles in the countryside surroundings, constructed by wealthy medieval families living in the city. The most notable of them is the Bonțida Bánffy Castle—once known as "the Versailles of Transylvania"—in the nearby village of Bonțida, 32 kilometres (20 mi) from the city centre. In 1963, the castle was used as a set for Liviu Ciulei's film Forest of the Hanged, which won an award at Cannes. There are other castles located in the vicinity of the city; indeed, the castle at Bonțida is not even the only one constructed by the Bánffy family. The commune of Gilău features the Wass-Bánffy Castle, while another Bánffy Castle is located in the Răscruci area. In addition, Nicula Monastery, erected during the 18th century, is an important pilgrimage site in northern Transylvania. This monastery houses the renowned wonder-working Madonna of Nicula. The icon is said to have wept between 15 February and 12 March 1669. During this time, nobles, officers, laity and clergy came to see it. At first they were sceptical, looking at it on both sides, but then humbly crossed themselves and returned home petrified by the wonder they had seen. During the feast of the Dormition of the Theotokos (commemorating the death of the Virgin Mary) on 15 August, more than 150,000 people from all over the country come to visit the monastery.

=== Climate ===
Cluj-Napoca has a warm-summer humid continental climate (Köppen: Dfb). The climate is influenced by the city's proximity to the Apuseni Mountains, as well as by urbanisation. Some West-Atlantic influences are present during winter and autumn. Winter temperatures are often below 0 °C (32 °F), even though they rarely drop below −10 °C (14 °F). On average, snow covers the ground for 65 days each winter. In summer, the average temperature is approximately 20 °C (68 °F), despite the fact that temperatures sometimes reach 35 °C (95 °F) in mid-summer in the city centre. There are infrequent yet heavy and often violent storms in summer. During spring and autumn, temperatures vary between 0 °C (32 °F) to 22 °C (72 °F), with more frequent yet milder periods of rain.

The city has the best air quality in the European Union, according to research published in 2014 by a French magazine and air-quality organisation that studied the EU's hundred largest cities.

Climate data for Cluj-Napoca, 1991–2020 normals, extremes 1901–present
Month	Jan	Feb	Mar	Apr	May	Jun	Jul	Aug	Sep	Oct	Nov	Dec	Year
Record high °C (°F)	15.4 (59.7)	19.6 (67.3)	27.9 (82.2)	30.2 (86.4)	32.2 (90.0)	36.9 (98.4)	38.6 (101.5)	38.5 (101.3)	34.4 (93.9)	32.6 (90.7)	26.0 (78.8)	18.7 (65.7)	38.6 (101.5)
Mean daily maximum °C (°F)	0.9 (33.6)	4.1 (39.4)	10.2 (50.4)	16.6 (61.9)	21.4 (70.5)	25.0 (77.0)	26.7 (80.1)	27.0 (80.6)	21.5 (70.7)	15.6 (60.1)	8.4 (47.1)	1.9 (35.4)	14.9 (58.8)
Daily mean °C (°F)	−2.5 (27.5)	−0.4 (31.3)	4.3 (39.7)	10.1 (50.2)	14.9 (58.8)	18.5 (65.3)	20.1 (68.2)	19.8 (67.6)	14.7 (58.5)	9.4 (48.9)	3.9 (39.0)	−1.1 (30.0)	9.3 (48.7)
Mean daily minimum °C (°F)	−5.2 (22.6)	−3.8 (25.2)	−0.1 (31.8)	4.7 (40.5)	9.1 (48.4)	12.7 (54.9)	14.2 (57.6)	13.9 (57.0)	9.6 (49.3)	4.9 (40.8)	0.6 (33.1)	−3.6 (25.5)	4.8 (40.6)
Record low °C (°F)	−34.2 (−29.6)	−32.5 (−26.5)	−22.0 (−7.6)	−8.4 (16.9)	−3.5 (25.7)	0.4 (32.7)	5.2 (41.4)	1.7 (35.1)	−8.8 (16.2)	−16.8 (1.8)	−22.3 (−8.1)	−27.9 (−18.2)	−34.2 (−29.6)
Average precipitation mm (inches)	27.3 (1.07)	24.8 (0.98)	34.6 (1.36)	51.0 (2.01)	71.2 (2.80)	91.0 (3.58)	87.2 (3.43)	64.7 (2.55)	55.5 (2.19)	45.3 (1.78)	33.8 (1.33)	34.0 (1.34)	620.4 (24.43)
Average snowfall cm (inches)	6.0 (2.4)	11.5 (4.5)	5.8 (2.3)	1.3 (0.5)	0.0 (0.0)	0.0 (0.0)	0.0 (0.0)	0.0 (0.0)	0.0 (0.0)	0.5 (0.2)	2.6 (1.0)	5.8 (2.3)	33.5 (13.2)
Average precipitation days (≥ 1.0 mm)	6.7	6.8	7.0	8.5	10.1	10.6	10.0	7.1	7.6	7.0	6.5	6.9	94.8
Average snowy days	13.6	10.3	5.5	1.4	0	0	0	0	0.2	0.2	4.5	11	46.7
Average relative humidity (%)	87	82	74	72	74	77	76	76	78	81	86	88	79
Average dew point °C (°F)	−4.3 (24.3)	−4.7 (23.5)	−0.3 (31.5)	3.8 (38.8)	9.1 (48.4)	11.9 (53.4)	12.8 (55.0)	12.9 (55.2)	10.2 (50.4)	5.5 (41.9)	0.6 (33.1)	2.9 (37.2)	5.0 (41.1)
Mean monthly sunshine hours	70.2	100.9	159.2	188.7	230.1	253.1	265.7	260.7	190.2	153.5	89.4	54.6	2,016.3
Mean daily daylight hours	9	10.3	11.9	13.6	15.1	15.8	15.4	14.2	12.5	10.9	9.4	8.6	12.2
Average ultraviolet index	1	2	3	5	7	8	8	7	5	3	1	1	4
Source 1: NOAA (snow and Dew Point 1961–1990) Romanian National Statistic Institute
Source 2: Deutscher Wetterdienst (humidity, 1973–1993), Weather Atlas (Daylight-UV), Meteomanz (snow days 2000–2023, extremes since 2021)

== Law and government ==
=== Administration ===
Location in Cluj County

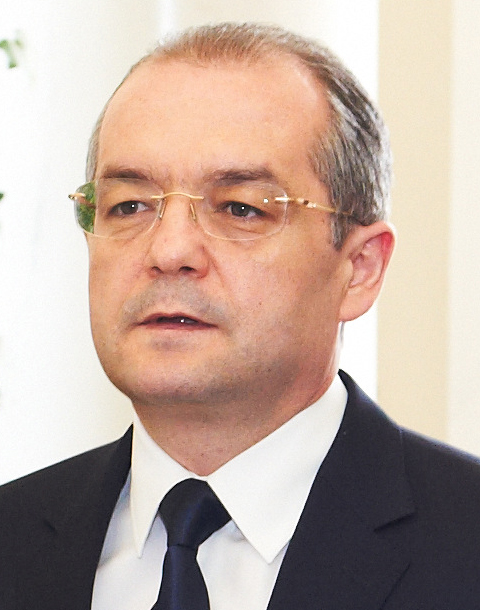
Emil Boc, mayor since 2012

The city government is headed by a mayor. Since 2012, the office is held by Emil Boc, who was returned at that year's local election for a third term, having resigned in 2008 to become Prime Minister. Decisions are approved and discussed by the local government (consiliu local) made up of 27 elected councillors. The city is divided into 15 districts (cartiere) laid out radially. City hall intends to develop local administrative branches for most of the districts.

Party	Seats	Current Local Council
National Liberal Party (PNL)	16	
Save Romania Union (USR)	5	
Democratic Alliance of Hungarians (UDMR/RMDSZ)	4	
Social Democratic Party (PSD)	2	

- Andrei Mureșanu
- Bulgaria
- Bună Ziua
- Centru
- Dâmbul Rotund
- Gheorgheni
- Grădinile Mănăștur
- Grigorescu
- Gruia
- Iris
- Între Lacuri
- Mănăștur
- Mărăști
- Someșeni
- Zorilor

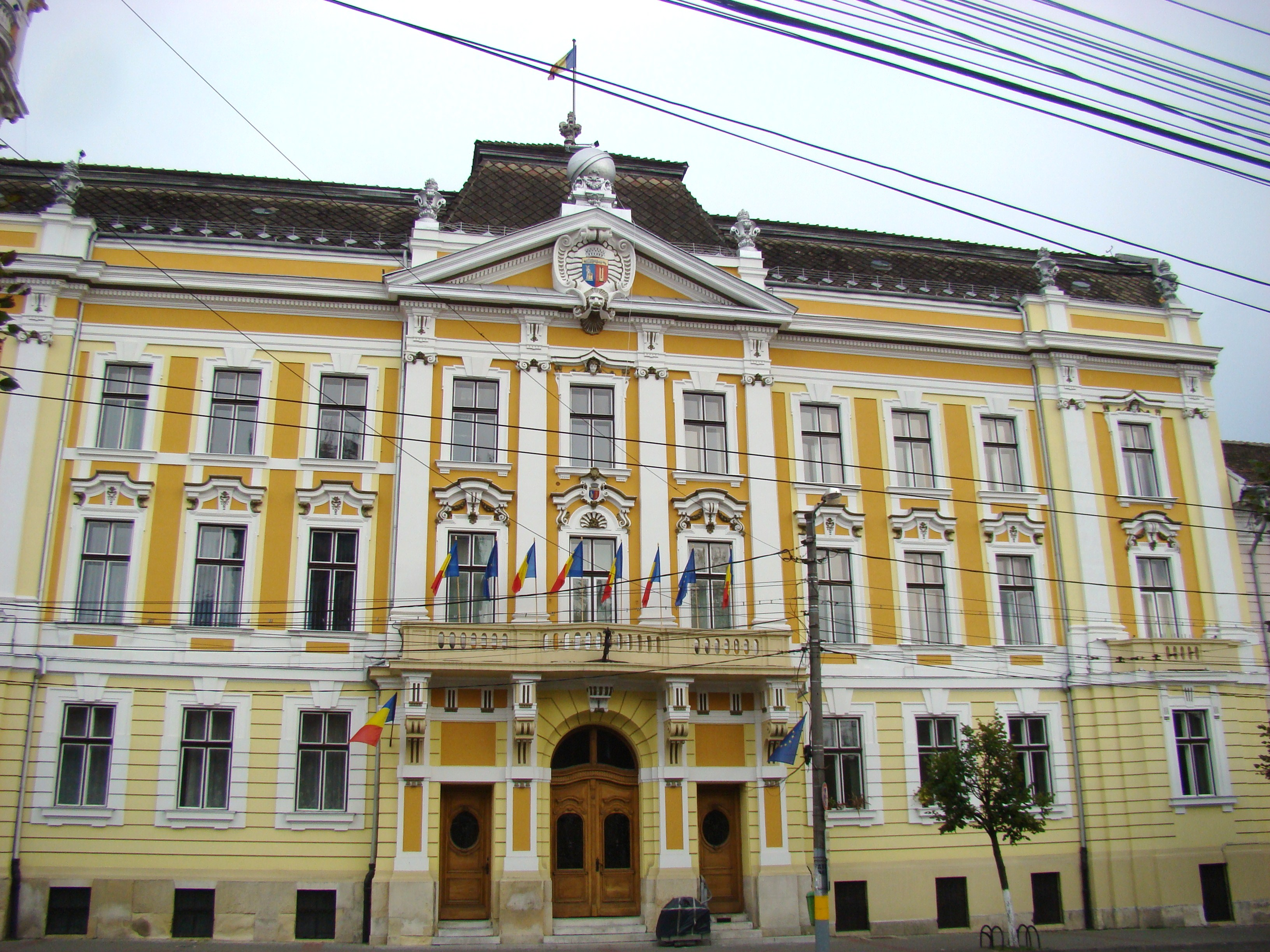
Cluj-Napoca City Hall

Because of the last years' massive urban development, in 2005 some areas of Cluj were named as districts (Sopor, Borhanci, Becaș, Făget, Zorilor South), but most of them are still construction sites. Beside these, there are some other building areas like Tineretului, Lombului or Oser, which are likely to become districts in the following years.

Additionally, as Cluj-Napoca is the capital of Cluj County, the city hosts the palace of the prefecture, the headquarters of the county council (consiliu județean) and the prefect, who is appointed by Romania's central government. The prefect is not allowed to be a member of a political party, and his role is to represent the national government at the local level, acting as a liaison and facilitating the implementation of National Development Plans and governing programmes at the local level. Like all other local councils in Romania, the Cluj-Napoca local council, the county council and the city's mayor are elected every four years by the population.

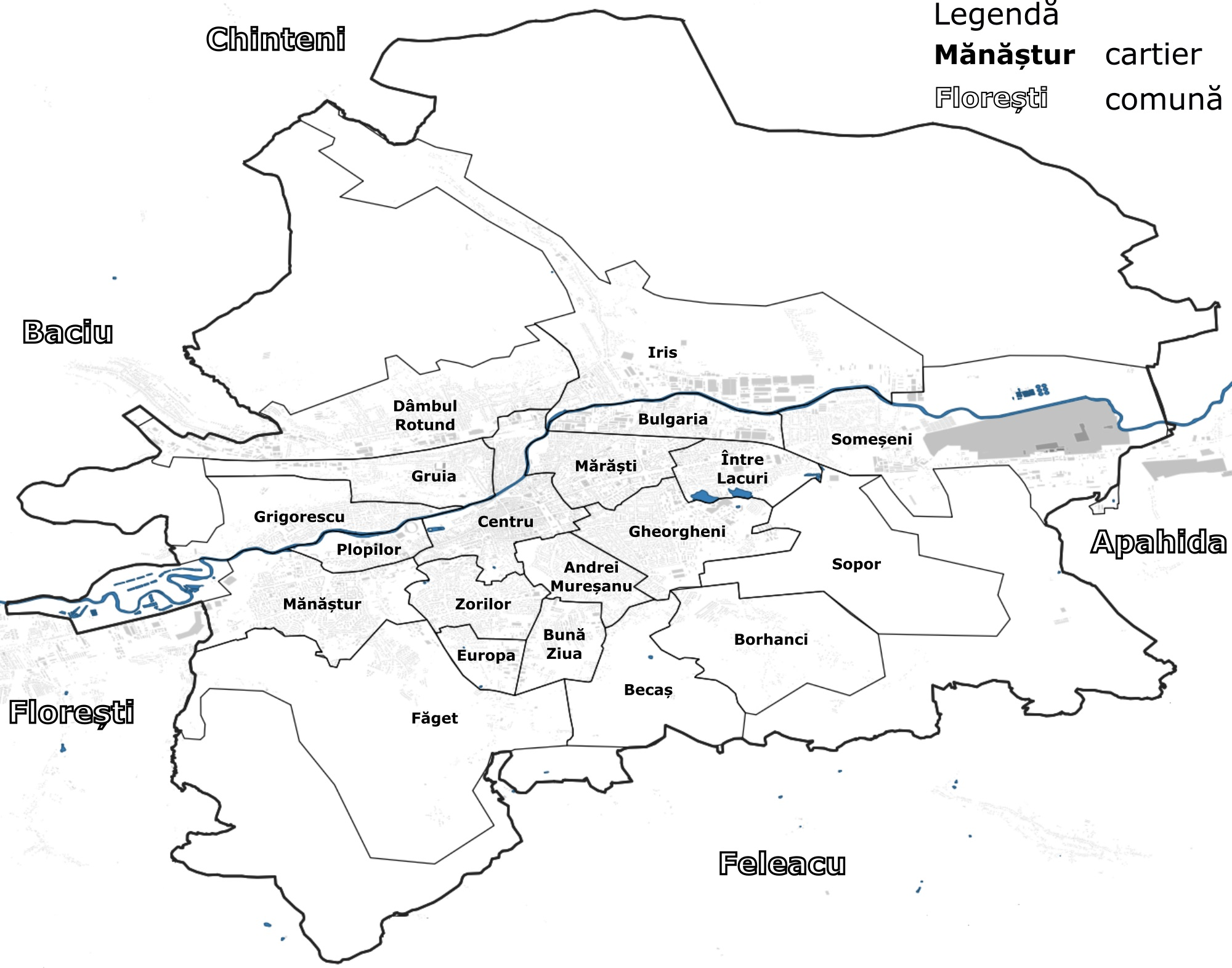
Map of Cluj-Napoca's districts (2007)

Cluj-Napoca is also the capital of the historical region of Transylvania, a status that resonates to this day. Currently, the city is the largest in the Nord-Vest development region, which is equivalent to NUTS-II regions in the European Union and is used by the European Union and the Romanian Government for statistical analysis and regional development. The Nord-Vest development region is not, however, an administrative entity. The Cluj-Napoca metropolitan area became operational in December 2008, and comprises a population of 411,379. Besides Cluj-Napoca, it includes seventeen communes: Aiton, Apahida, Baciu, Bonțida, Borșa, Căianu, Chinteni, Ciurila, Cojocna, Feleacu, Florești, Gârbău, Gilău, Jucu, Petreștii de Jos, Tureni and Vultureni.

The executive presidium of the Democratic Union of Hungarians in Romania (UDMR) and all its departments are headquartered in Cluj, as are local and regional organisations of most Romanian political parties. In order to counterbalance the political influence of Transylvania's Hungarian minority, nationalist Romanians in Transylvania founded the Party of Romanian National Unity (PUNR) at the beginnings of the 1990s; the party was present in the Romanian Parliament during the 1992–1996 legislature. The party eventually moved its main offices to Bucharest and fell into decline as its leadership joined the ideologically similar PRM. In 2008, the Institute for Research on National Minorities, subordinated to the Romanian Government, opened its official headquarters in Cluj-Napoca.

Eleven hospitals function in the city, nine of which are run by the county and two (for oncology and cardiology) by the health ministry. Additionally, there are well over a hundred private medical cabinets and dentists' offices each. In 2022, work began on an emergency hospital for the entire North-West region; the cost is estimated at over 500 million euros.

=== Justice system ===
Cluj-Napoca has a complex judicial organisation, as a consequence of its status of county capital. The Cluj-Napoca Court of Justice is the local judicial institution and is under the purview of the Cluj County Tribunal, which also exerts its jurisdiction over the courts of Dej, Gherla, Turda, and Huedin. Appeals from these tribunals' verdicts, and more serious cases, are directed to the Cluj Court of Appeals. The city also hosts the county's commercial and military tribunals.

Cluj-Napoca has its own municipal police force, Poliția Municipiului Cluj-Napoca, which is responsible for policing of crime within the whole city, and operates a number of special divisions. The Cluj-Napoca Police are headquartered on Decebal Street in the city centre (with a number of precincts throughout the city) and it is subordinated to the County's Police Inspectorate on Traian Street. City Hall has its own community police force, Poliția Primăriei, dealing with local community issues. Cluj-Napoca also houses the County's Gendarmerie Inspectorate.

=== Crime ===
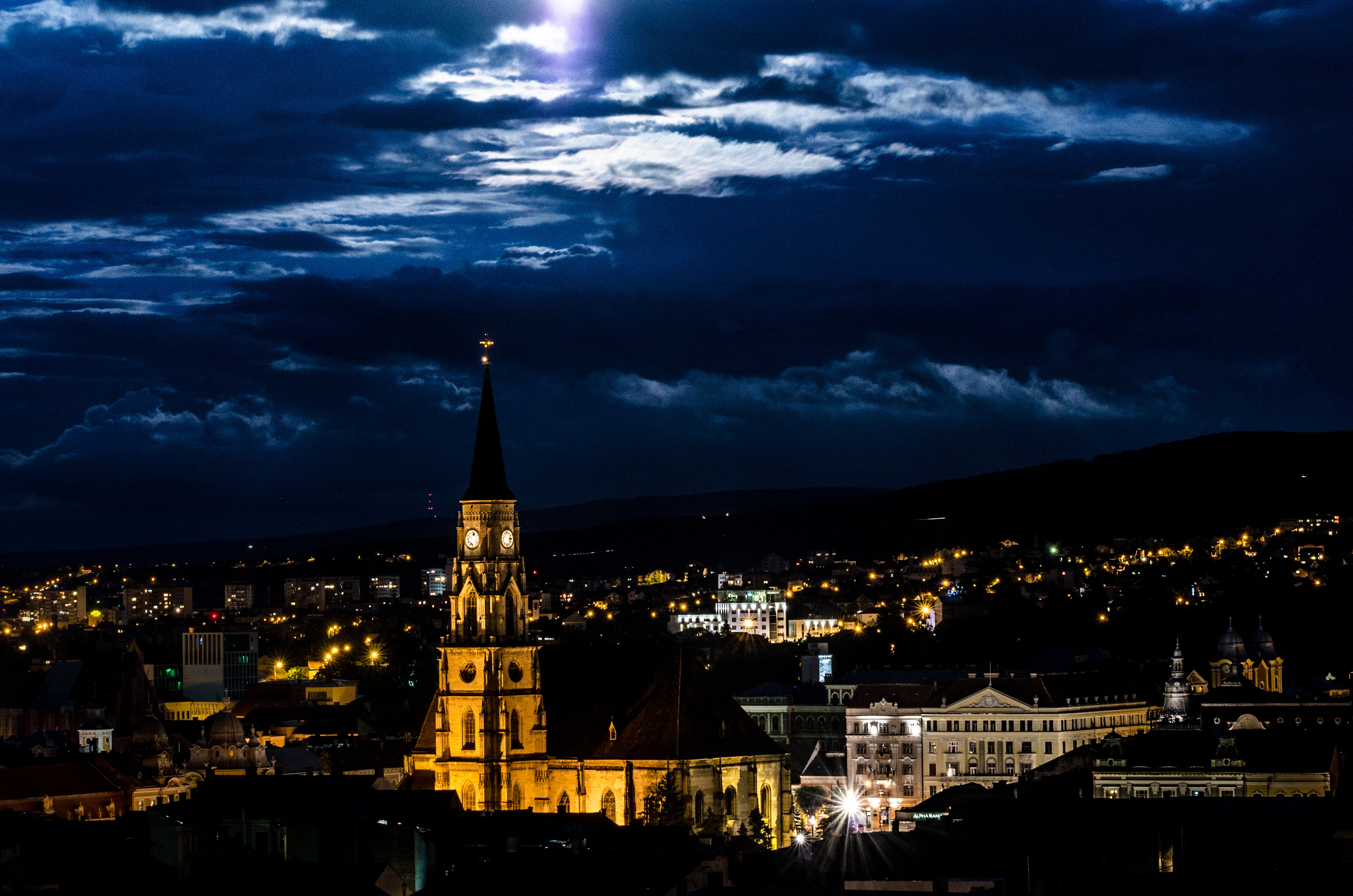
Part of the old city centre, as viewed from Cetățuia

Cluj-Napoca and the surrounding area (Cluj County) had a rate of 268 criminal convictions per 100,000 inhabitants during 2006, just above the national average. After the revolution in 1989, the criminal conviction rate in the county entered a phase of sustained growth, reaching a historic high of 429 in 1998, when it began to fall. Although the overall crime rate is reassuringly low, petty crime can be an irritant for foreigners, as in other large cities of Romania. During the 1990s, two large financial institutions, Banca Dacia Felix and Caritas, went bankrupt due to large-scale fraud and embezzlement.

Also notorious was the case of serial killer Romulus Vereș, "the man with the hammer"; during the 1970s, he was charged with five murders and several attempted murders, but never imprisoned on grounds of insanity: he had schizophrenia, blaming the Devil for his actions. Instead, he was institutionalised in the Ștei psychiatric facility in 1976, following a three-year forensic investigation during which four thousand people were questioned. Urban myths brought the number of victims up to two hundred women, though the actual number was much smaller. This confusion is probably explained by the lack of attention this case received, despite its magnitude, in the Communist press of the time.

A 2006 poll shows a high degree of satisfaction with the work of the local police department. More than half the people surveyed during a 2005–2006 poll declared themselves satisfied (62.3%) or very satisfied (3.3%) with the activity of the county police department. The study found the highest satisfaction with car traffic supervision, the presence of officers in the street, and road education; on the negative side, corruption and public transport safety remain concerns.

Efforts made by local authorities in the Cluj-Napoca district at the end of the 1990s to reform the protection of children's rights and assistance for street children proved insufficient due to lack of funding, incoherent policies and the absence of any real collaboration between the actors involved (Child Rights Protection Directorate, Social Assistance Service within the District Directorate for Labour and Social Protection, Minors Receiving Centre, Guardian Authority within the City Hall, Police). In 2007, it was reported that there were still high numbers of street children, whose poverty and lack of documented identity brought them into constant conflict with local law enforcement.

Following cooperation between the local governmental council and the Prison Fellowship Romania Foundation, homeless people, street children and beggars are taken, identified and accommodated within the Christian Centres for Street Children and Homeless People, respectively, and the Ruhama centre. The latter features a marshaling centre for beggars and street children, as well as a flophouse. As a consequence, the fluctuating movement of children, beggars and homeless people in and out of the centre has been considerably reduced, with most of the initial beneficiaries successfully integrated into the programme rather than returning to the streets.

From 2000 onwards, Cluj-Napoca has seen an increase in illegal road races, which occur mainly at night on the city's outskirts or on industrial sites and occasionally produce victims. There have been attempts to organise legal races as a solution to this problem.

== Demographics ==
Historical population of Cluj-Napoca
Year	Population	%±	Romanians	Hungarians
1453 est.	6,000	—	—N/a	—N/a
1703	7,500	25%	—N/a	—N/a
1714	5,000	−33.3%	—N/a	—N/a
1770	10,500	110%	—N/a	—N/a
1785	9,703	−7.6%	—N/a	—N/a
1787	10,476	7.9%	—N/a	—N/a
1835	14,000	33.6%	—N/a	—N/a
1850	19,612	40%	21.0%	62.8%
1880	32,831	67.4%	17.1%	72.1%
1890	37,184	13.2%	15.2%	79.1%
1900	50,908	36.9%	14.1%	81.1%
1910 census^{[b]}	62,733	23.2%	14.2%	81.6%
1920	85,509	36.3%	34.7%	49.3%
1930 census	100,844	17.9%	34.6%	47.3%
1941^{[c]}^{[d]}	114,984	14%	9.8%	85.7%
1948 census	117,915	2.5%	40%	57%
1956 census^{[e]}	154,723	31.2%	47.8%	47.9%
1966 census	185,663	20%	56.5%	41.4%
1977 census	262,858	41.5%	65.8%	32.8%
1992 census	328,602	25%	76.6%	22.7%
2002 census	317,953	−3.2%	79.4%	19.0%
2011 census^{[f]}	324,576	2.1%	81.5%	16.4%
2021 census	286,598	−11.7%	84.6%	13.9%
Source (if not otherwise specified): Varga E. Árpád

The city's population, at the 2021 census, was 286,598 inhabitants, marking a decrease from the figure recorded at the 2011 census (324,576 inhabitants). The population of the Cluj-Napoca metropolitan area was estimated at 411,379 (2011). As defined by Eurostat, the Cluj-Napoca functional urban area has a population of 379,733 residents (as of 2015). Finally, the population of the peri-urban area numbers over 420,000 residents. The new metropolitan government of Cluj-Napoca became operational in December 2008. According to the 2007 data provided by the County Population Register Service, the total population of the city is as high as 392,276 people. The variation between this number and the census data is partially explained by the real growth of the population residing in Cluj-Napoca, as well as by different counting methods: "In reality, more people live in Cluj than those who are officially registered", Traian Rotariu, director of the Centre for Population Studies, told Foaia Transilvană. Moreover, this number does not include the floating population—an average of over 20 thousand people each year during 2004–2007, according to the same source.

Ethnic composition of Cluj-Napoca (2021)
1. Romanians (84.6%)
2. Hungarians (13.9%)
3. Romani (0.73%)
4. Germans (Transylvanian Saxons) (0.18%)
5. Others (0.61%)
Religious composition of Cluj-Napoca (2021)
1. Romanian Orthodox (68.8%)
2. Reformed (9.45%)
3. Roman Catholics (4.69%)
4. Greek Catholics (4.61%)
5. Pentecostals (2.97%)
6. Baptists (1.55%)
7. Unitarians (0.91%)
8. Jehovah's Witnesses (0.68%)
9. Others (1.35%)
10. Irreligious, atheist, and agnostic (4.96%)

In the modern era, Cluj's population experienced two phases of rapid growth, the first in the late 19th century, when the city grew in importance and size, and the second during the Communist period, when a massive urbanisation campaign was launched and many people migrated from rural areas and from beyond the Carpathians to the county's capital. About two-thirds of the population growth during this era was based on net migration inflows; after 1966, the date of Ceaușescu's ban on abortion and contraception, natural increase was also significant, being responsible for the remaining third.

From the Middle Ages onwards, the city of Cluj has been a multicultural city with a diverse cultural and religious life. In 1930, the city was 26.7% Reformed, 22.6% Greek Catholic, 20.1% Roman Catholic, 13.4% Jewish, 11.8% Orthodox, 2.4% Lutheran and 2.1% Unitarian. Contributing factors for demographic shifts were the extermination and emigration of the city's Jews, the outlawing of the Greek-Catholic Church (1948–89) and the gradual decline in the Hungarian population.

On a more historical note, the Jewish community has figured centrally in the history of Transylvania, and in that of the wider region. They were a substantial and increasingly vibrant presence in Cluj in the modern era, contributing significantly to the town's economic dynamism and cultural flourishing in the late 19th and early 20th centuries. Although the community comprised a significant share of the town's population during the interwar era—between 13 and 15 percent—this figure plummeted as a consequence of the Holocaust and emigration; by the 1990s only a few hundred Jews remained in Cluj-Napoca.

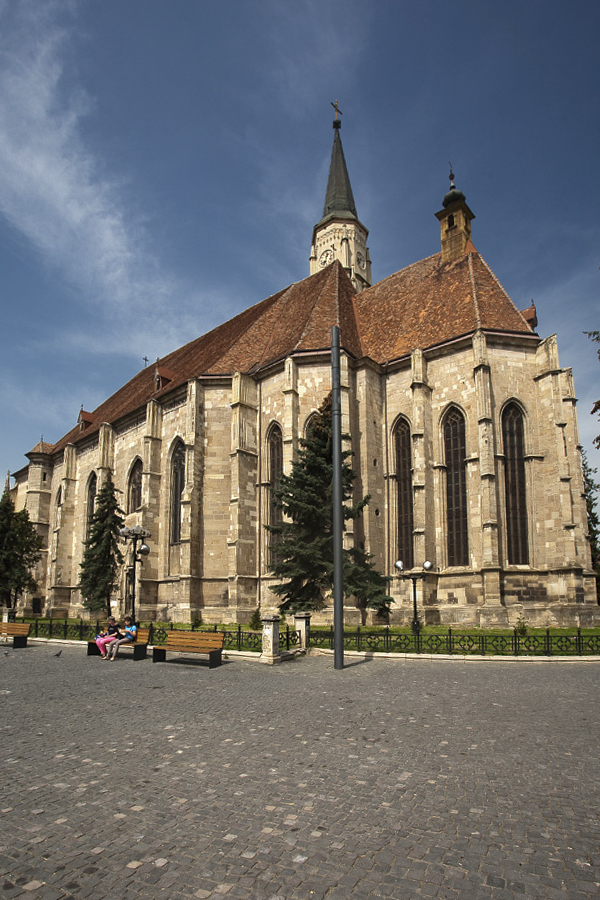
St. Michael's Church, the city's largest Gothic-style church

In the 14th century, most of the town's inhabitants and the local elite were Saxons, largely descended from settlers brought in by the Kings of Hungary in the twelfth and thirteenth centuries to develop and defend the southern borders of the province. By the middle of the next century roughly half the population had Hungarian names. In Transylvania as a whole, the Reformation sharpened ethnic divisions: Saxons became Lutheran while Hungarians either remained Catholic or became Calvinist or Unitarian. In Kolozsvár, however, the religious lines were blurred. Isolated both geographically from the main areas of German settlement in southern Transylvania and institutionally because of their distinctive religious trajectory, many Saxons eventually assimilated to the Hungarian majority over several generations. New settlers to the town largely spoke Hungarian, a language that many Saxons gradually adopted. (In the seventeenth century, out of more than thirty royal free towns, only seven had a Hungarian majority, with Kolozsvár/Klausenburg being one of them; the rest were largely German-dominated.) In this manner Kolozsvár became largely Hungarian speaking and would remain so through the mid-20th century, though 4.8% of its residents identified as German as late as 1880.

The Roma form a sizable minority in contemporary Romania, and a small but visible presence in Cluj-Napoca: self-identifying Roma in the city comprise only 1 percent of the population; yet they are a familiar presence in and around the central market, selling flowers, used clothes, and tinware. They are an important object of public discourse and media representation at the national level; however, Cluj-Napoca, with its small Roma population, has not been a major focus of Roma ethno-political activity. The presence of Roma in Cluj is attested at least from the 16th century. Roma who had arrived from elsewhere built huts that were considered a fire hazard; in 1585, the town council voted for their demolition.

=== Hungarian community ===
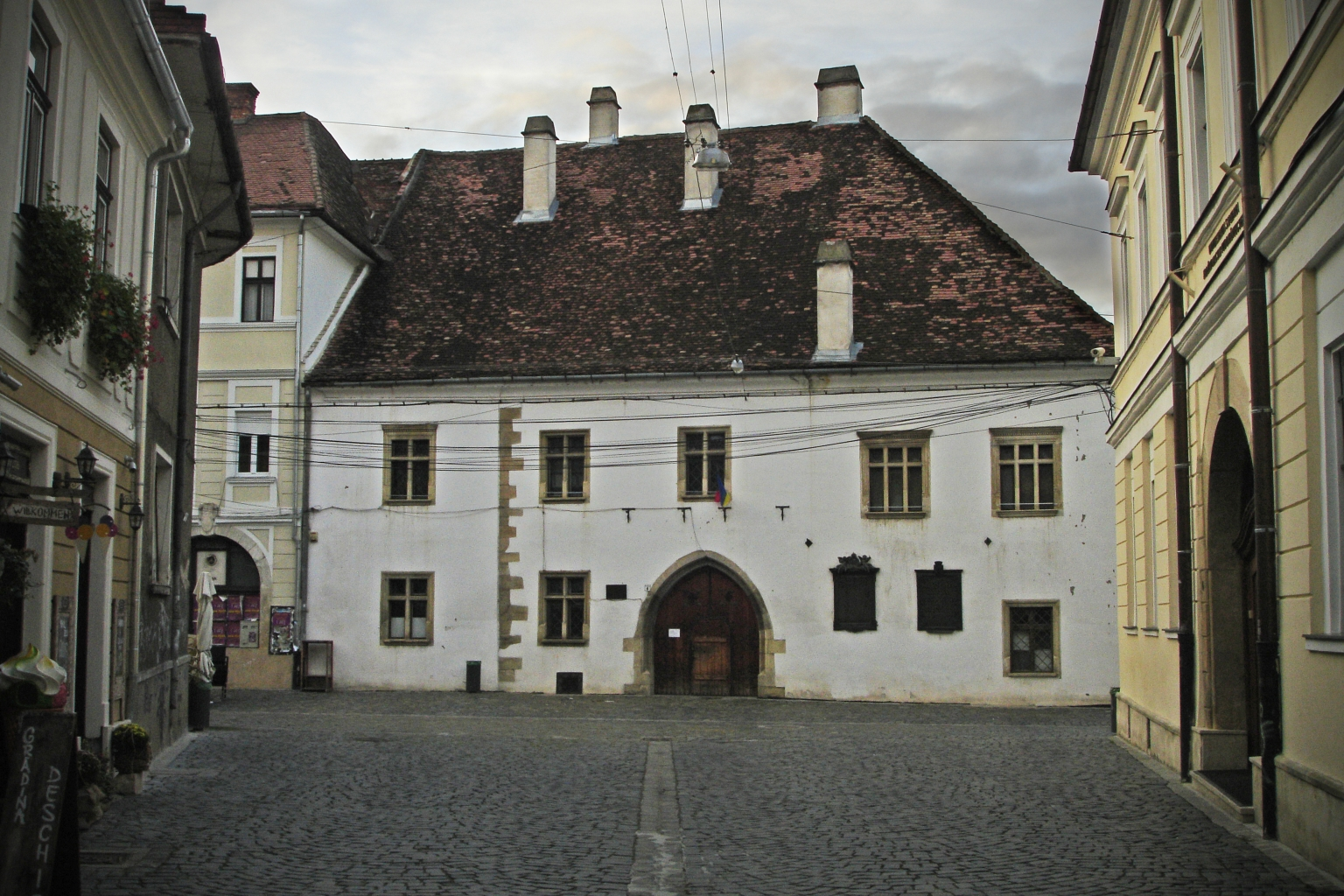
Matthias Corvinus Alley, facing the birthplace of the eponymous King of Hungary

Almost 50,000 Hungarians live in Cluj-Napoca. The city is home to the second-largest urban Hungarian community in Romania, after Târgu Mureș, with an active cultural and academic life: the city features a Hungarian state theatre and opera, as well as Hungarian research institutions, such as Erdélyi Múzeumi Egyesület (EME), Erdélyi Magyar Műszaki Tudományos Társaság and Bolyai Társaság. With respect to religious affairs, the city houses central offices for the Reformed Diocese of Transylvania, the Unitarian Diocese and an Evangelical Lutheran Church Diocese (all of which train their clergy at the Protestant Theological Institute of Cluj). Several newspapers and magazines are published in the Hungarian language, yet the community also receives public and private television and radio broadcasts (see Culture and media). As of 2007, 7,000 students attended courses in the 55 Hungarian-language specialisations at the Babeș-Bolyai University. Gheorghe Funar, mayor of Cluj-Napoca from 1992 to 2004, was notorious for acts of ethnic provocation, bedecking the city's streets in the colours of the Romanian flag and arranging pickets outside the city's Hungarian consulate; however, tensions have subsided since. Since 2010, the Hungarian Cultural Days of Cluj festival takes place each summer.

== Economy ==
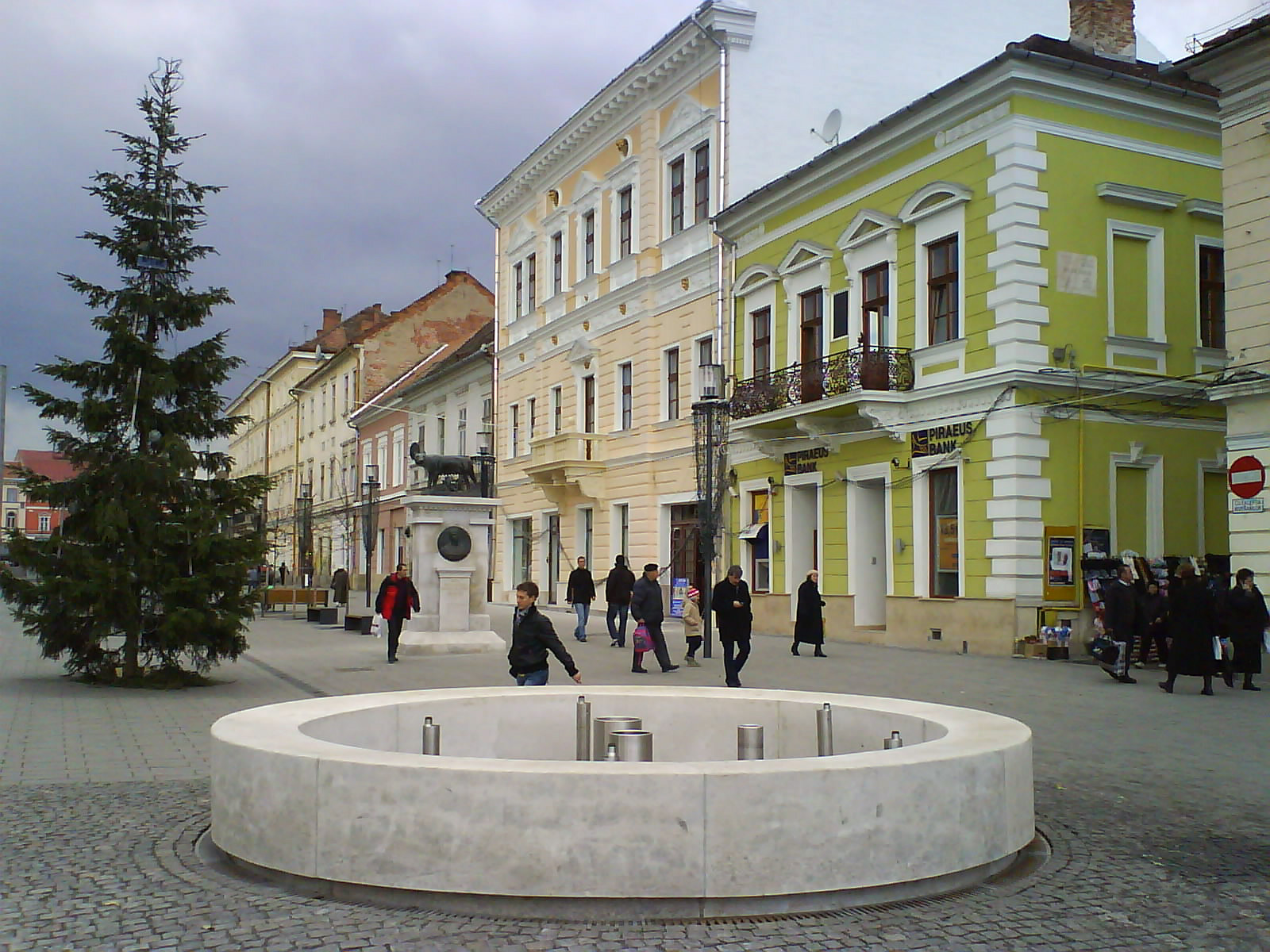
Eroilor Avenue, the largest and most expensive commercial street

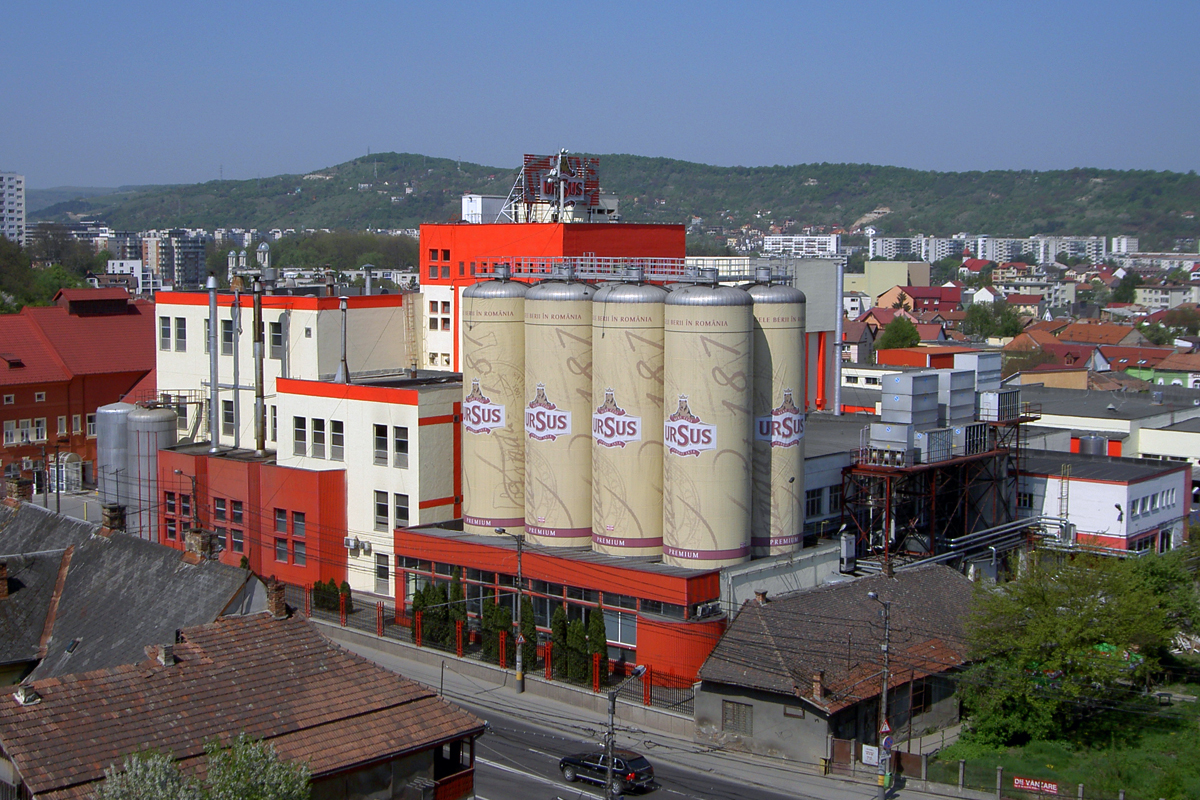
The Ursus Brewery, where a popular Romanian beer is produced

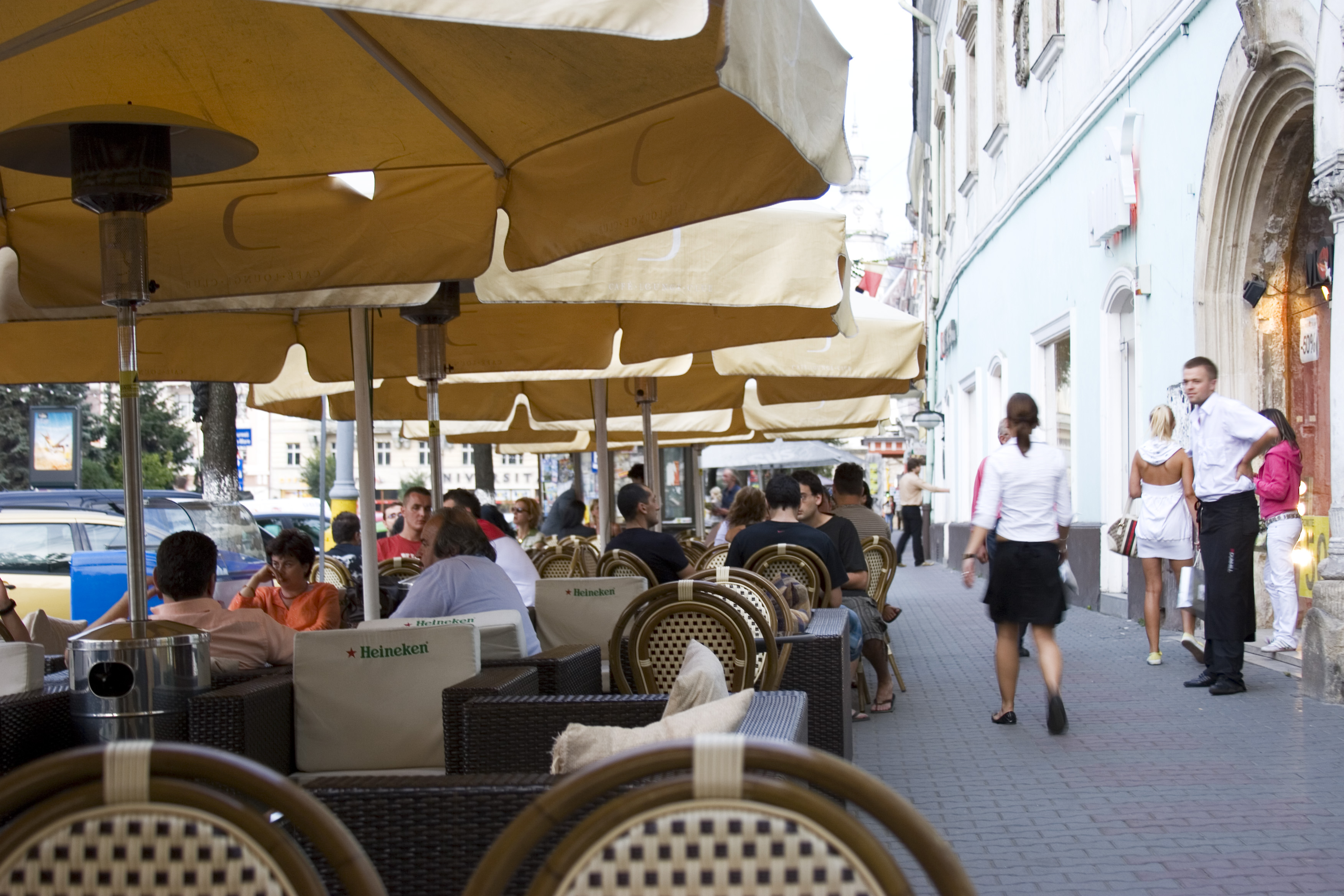
Promenade area in Unirii Square

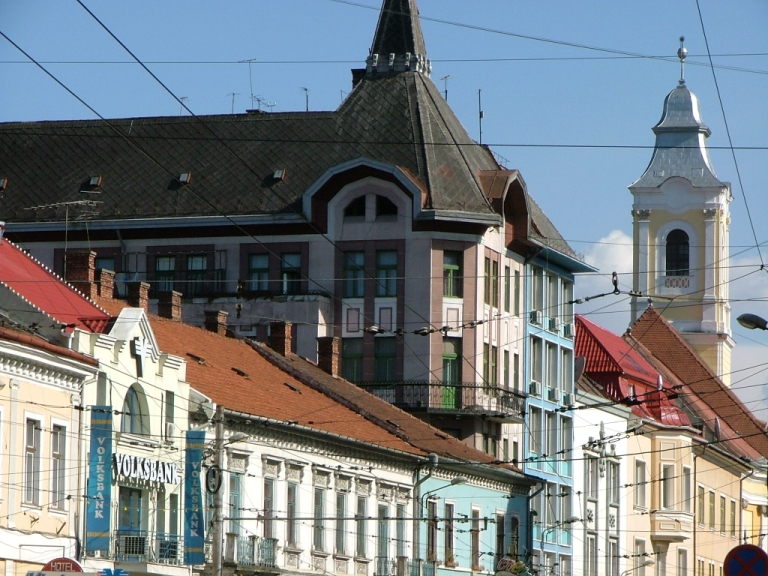
Regele Ferdinand Avenue, another large commercial street

Cluj-Napoca is an important economic centre in Romania. Local brands that have become well known at a national, and to some extent even international level, include: Banca Transilvania, Terapia Ranbaxy, Farmec, Jolidon, and Ursus breweries.

The American online magazine InformationWeek reports that much of the software/IT activity in Romania is taking place in Cluj-Napoca, which is quickly becoming Romania's technopolis. Nokia invested 200 million euros in a mobile telephone factory near Cluj-Napoca; this began production in February 2008 and closed in December 2011. It also opened a research centre in the city that was shut down in April 2011. The former Nokia factory was purchased by Italian appliance manufacturer De'Longhi. The city houses regional or national headquarters of MOL, Aegon, Emerson, De'Longhi, Bechtel, FrieslandCampina, Office Depot, Genpact and New Yorker. Bosch has also built a factory near Cluj-Napoca, in the same industrial park as De'Longhi.

Cluj-Napoca is also an important regional commercial centre, with many street malls and hypermarkets. Eroilor Avenue and Napoca and Memorandumului streets are the most expensive venues, with a yearly rent price of 720 euro/m^{2}, but Regele Ferdinand and 21 Decembrie 1989 avenues also feature high rental costs. There are two large malls: VIVO! (including a Carrefour hypermarket) and Iulius Mall (including an Auchan hypermarket). Other large stores include branches of various international hypermarket chains, like Cora, Metro, Selgros and do-it-yourself stores such as Baumax and Praktiker.

Among the retailers found in the city's shopping centres are H&M, Zara, Guess, Camaïeu, Bigotti, Orsay, Jolidon, Kenvelo, Triumph, Tommy Hilfiger, Sephora, Yves Rocher, Swarovski, Ecco, Bata, Adidas, Converse, and Nike.

In 2021, the city's general budget was 2.117 billion lei, the equivalent of over 433 million Euros. This marks a 114% increase over the 2008 level of 990 million lei or 266 million Euros.

=== Tourism ===
In 2007, the hotel industry in the county of Cluj offered total accommodations of 6,472 beds, of which 3,677 were in hotels, 1,294 in guesthouses and the rest in chalets, campgrounds, or hostels. A total of 700,000 visitors, 140,000 of whom were foreigners, stayed overnight. However, a considerable share of visits is made by those who visit Cluj-Napoca for a single day, and their exact number is not known. The largest numbers of foreign visitors come from Hungary, Italy, Germany, the United States, France, and Austria. Moreover, the city's 140 or so travel agencies help organise domestic and foreign trips; car rentals are also available.

== Arts and culture ==
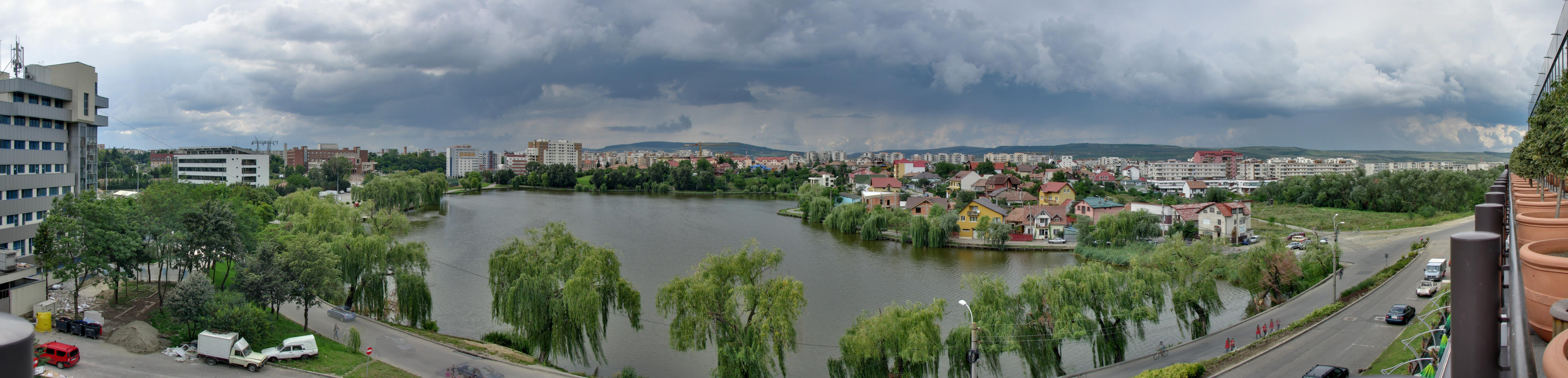
View of Gheorgheni Lake and Iulius Park

Cluj-Napoca has a diverse and growing cultural scene, with cultural life exhibited in a number of fields, including the visual arts, performing arts and nightlife. The city's cultural scene spans its history, dating back to Roman times: the city started to be built in that period, which has left its mark on the urban layout (centred on today's Piața Muzeului) as well as surviving ruins. However, the medieval town saw a shift in its centre towards new civil and religious structures, notably St. Michael's Church. During the 16th century the city became the chief cultural and religious centre of Transylvania; in the 1820s and the first half of the 1830s, Kolozsvár was the most important centre for Hungarian theatre and opera, while at the beginning of the 20th century, still a Hungarian city, it became the chief alternative to the cinematography of Budapest. After its incorporation into the Kingdom of Romania at the end of World War I, the renamed Cluj saw a resurgence of its Romanian culture, most conspicuous in the completion of the monumental Orthodox cathedral in 1933 across from the (newly nationalised) Romanian National Theatre. This marked an unambiguously "Romanian" centre, a few blocks to the east of the old Hungarian centre; however, the Romanian-ness of the town—like the Romanian hold on Transylvania—was by no means securely established even by the end of the interwar period. The late 1960s brought a revival of nationalist discourse, concomitant with the urbanisation and industrialisation of the city that gradually advanced the Romanianisation of the city. Nowadays, the city is home to people of different cultures, with corresponding cultural institutions such as the Hungarian State Theatre, as well as the British Council and various other centres for the promotion of foreign cultures. These institutions hold eclectic manifestations in honour of their cultures, including Bessarabian, Hungarian, Tunisian, and Japanese. Nevertheless, contemporary cultural manifestations cross ethnic boundaries, being aimed at students, cinephiles, and arts and science lovers, among others.

=== Landmarks ===
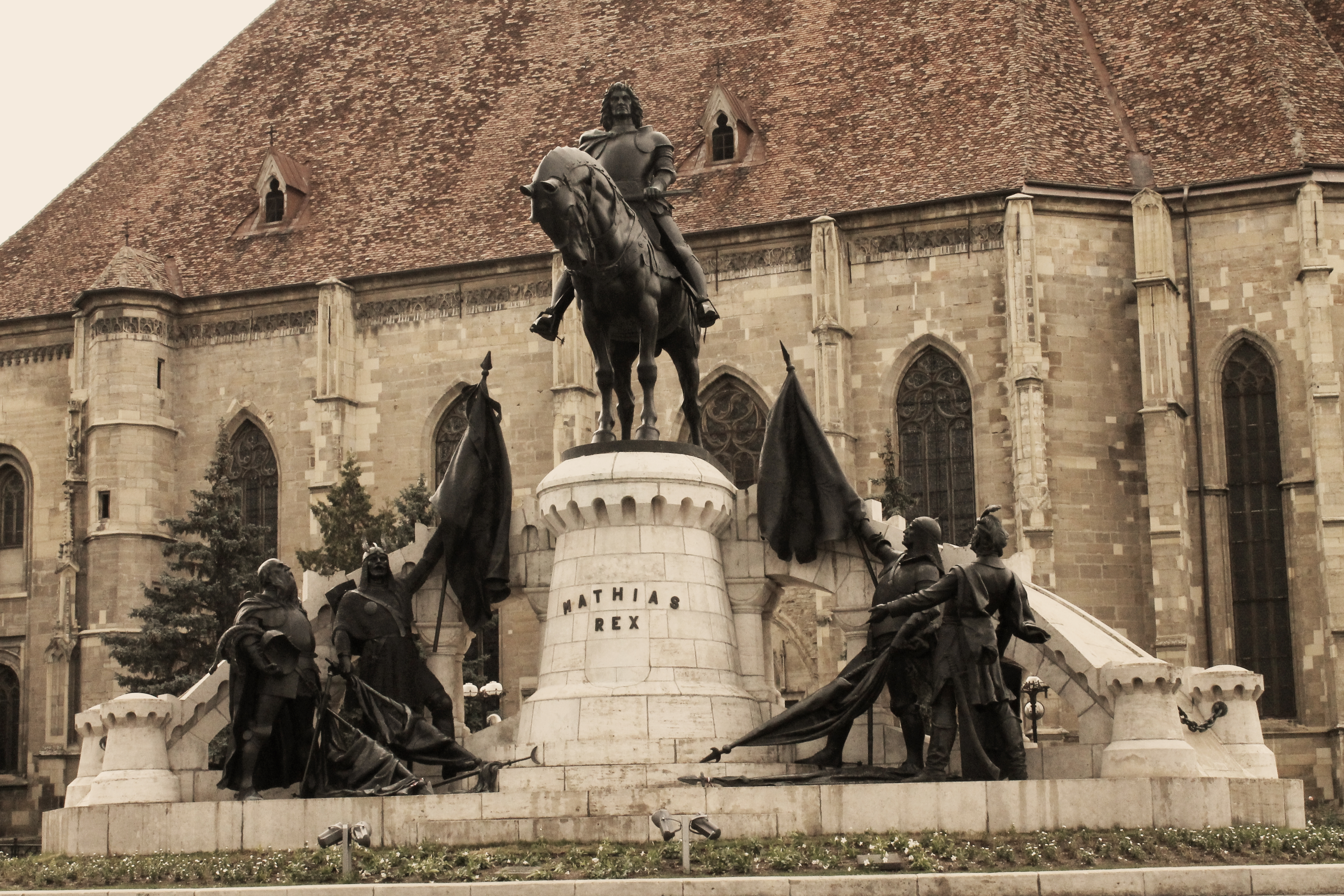
Statue of Matthias Corvinus in front of St. Michael's Church

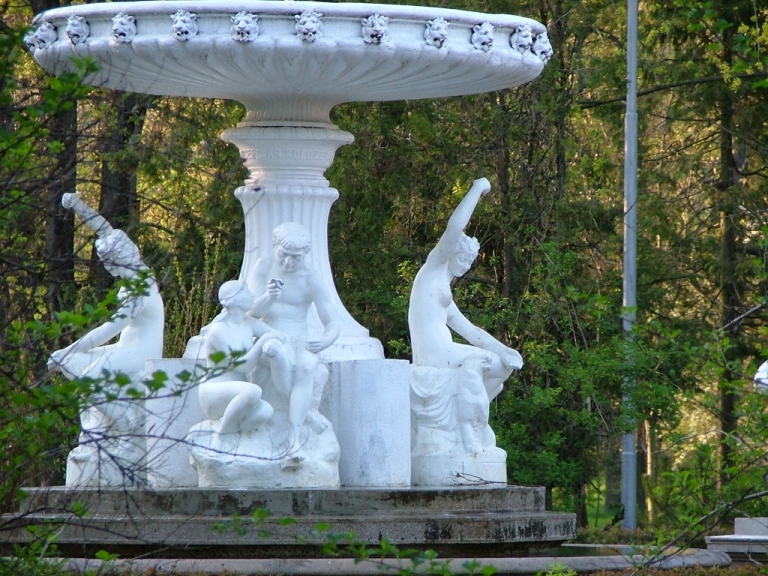
Fountain in the Central Park

Cluj-Napoca has a number of landmark buildings and monuments. One of those is the Saint Michael's Church in Unirii Square, built at the end of the 14th century in the Gothic style of that period. It was only in the 19th century that the Neo-Gothic tower of the church was erected; it remains the tallest church tower in Romania to this day.

In front of the church is the equestrian statue of Matthias Corvinus, erected in honour of the locally born King of Hungary. The Orthodox Church's equivalent to St. Michael's Church is the Orthodox Cathedral on Avram Iancu Square, built in the interwar era. The Romanian Greek-Catholic Church also has a cathedral in Cluj-Napoca, Transfiguration Cathedral.

Another landmark of Cluj-Napoca is the Palace of Justice, built between 1898 and 1902, and designed by architect Gyula Wagner in an eclectic style. This building is part of an ensemble erected in Avram Iancu Square that also includes the National Theatre, the Palace of Căile Ferate Române, the Palace of the Prefecture, the Palace of Finance and the Palace of the Orthodox Metropolis. An important eclectic ensemble is Iuliu Maniu Street, featuring symmetrical buildings on either side, after the urbanistic trend of Georges-Eugène Haussmann. A highlight of the city is the botanical garden, situated in the vicinity of the centre. Beside this garden, Cluj-Napoca is also home to some large parks, the most notable being the Central Park with the Chios Casino and a large statuary ensemble. Many of the city's notable figures are buried in Hajongard Cemetery, which covers 14 hectares (35 acres).

As an important cultural centre, Cluj-Napoca has many theatres and museums. The latter include the National Museum of Transylvanian History, the Ethnographic Museum, the Cluj-Napoca Art Museum, the Pharmacy Museum, the Water Museum and the museums of Babeș-Bolyai University—the University Museum, the Museum of Mineralogy, the Museum of Paleontology and Stratigraphy, the Museum of Speleology, the Botanical Museum and the Zoological Museum.

=== Visual arts ===
In terms of visual arts, the city contains a number of galleries featuring both classical and contemporary Romanian art, as well as selected international works.

The National Museum of Art is located in the former palace of the count György Bánffy, the most representative secular construction built in the Baroque style in Transylvania. The museum features extensive collections of Romanian art, including works of artists like Nicolae Grigorescu, Ștefan Luchian and Dimitrie Paciurea, as well as some works of foreign artists like Károly Lotz, Luca Giordano, Jean-Hippolyte Flandrin, Herri met de Bles and Claude Michel, and was nominated to be European Museum of the Year in 1996.

The most notable of the city's other galleries is the Gallery of the Union of Plastic Artists. Situated in the city centre, this gallery presents collections drawn from the contemporary arts scene. The Gallery of Folk Art includes traditional Romanian interior decoration artworks.

Historically, the city was one of the most important cultural and artistic centres in 16th-century Transylvania. The Renaissance workshop, formed in 1530 and strongly supported by the Transylvanian princes, served local and wider requirements: from the middle of the century onwards, when the Ottomans had conquered central Hungary, it extended its activity throughout the new principality. Its style, the "Flower Renaissance", used a variety of plant ornament enriched with coats of arms, figures and inscriptions. It continued to be of great importance into the 18th century, and traces of it are still apparent in 20th-century vernacular art; Klausenburg was central to the long, anachronistic survival of the style, particularly among Hungarians.

=== Performing arts ===
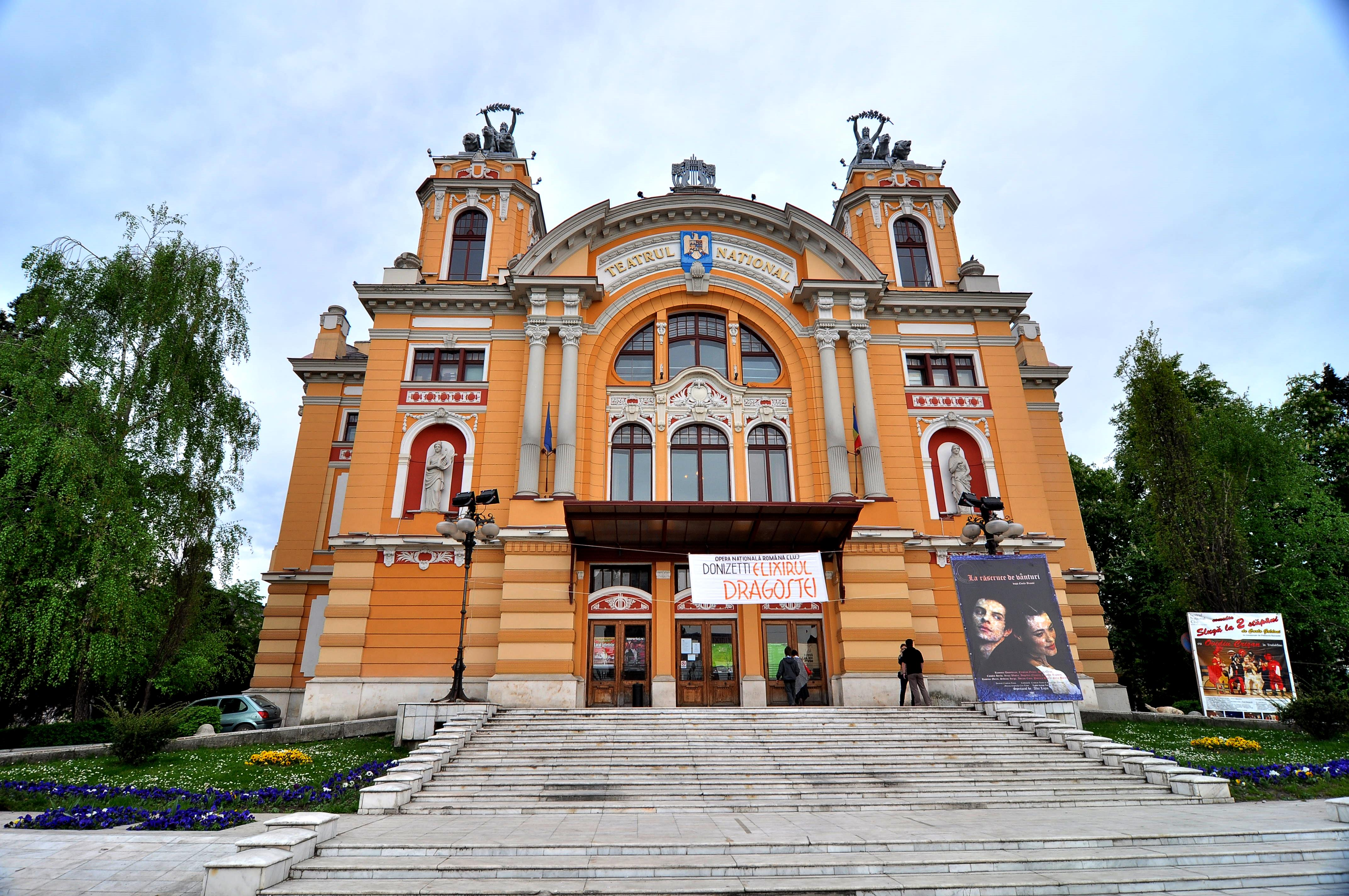
Lucian Blaga National Theatre

The city has a number of renowned facilities and institutions involving performing arts. The most prominent is the Neo-baroque theatre at the Avram Iancu Square. Built at the beginning of the 20th century by the Viennese company Helmer and Fellner, this structure is inscribed in UNESCO's list of specially protected monuments. Since 1919, shortly after the union of Transylvania with Romania, the building has hosted the Lucian Blaga National Theatre and the Romanian National Opera. The Transylvania Philharmonic, founded in 1955, gives classical music concerts. The multiculturalism in the city is once again attested by the Hungarian Theatre and Opera, home for four professional groups of performers. There is also a number of smaller independent theatres, including the Puck Theatre, where puppet shows are performed.

=== Music and nightlife ===
Cluj-Napoca is the residence of some well-known Romanian musicians. Examples of homegrown bands include the Romanian alternative rock band Kumm, the rock band Compact, the rhythm and blues band Nightlosers, the alternative band Luna Amară, Grimus—the winners of the 2007 National Finals of Global Battle of the Bands, the modern pop band Sistem—which finished third in the Eurovision Song Contest 2005, as well as a large assortment of electronic music producers. The Cheeky Girls also grew up in the city, where they studied at the High School of Choreography and Dramatic Art. While many discos play commercial house music, the city has an increasing minimal techno scene, and, to an extent jazz/blues and heavy metal/punk. The city's nightlife, particularly its club scene, grew significantly in the 1990s, and continues to increase. Most entertainment venues are dispersed throughout the city centre, spreading from the oldest one of all, Diesel Club, on Unirii Square. The list of large and fancy clubs continues with Obsession The Club and Midi, the latter being a venue for the new minimal techno music genre. These three clubs are classified as the top three clubs in the Transylvania-Banat region in a chart published by the national daily România Liberă. Numerous restaurants, pizzerias and coffee shops provide regional as well as international cuisine; many of these offer cultural activities like music and fashion shows or art exhibitions.

The city also includes Strada Piezișă (slanted street), a central nightlife strip located in the Hașdeu student area, where a large number of bars and terraces are situated. Cluj-Napoca is not limited to these international music genres, as there are also a number of discos where local "Lăutari" play manele, a local strain of Turkish-influenced music.

=== Traditional culture ===
In spite of the influences of modern culture, traditional Romanian culture continues to influence various domains of art.

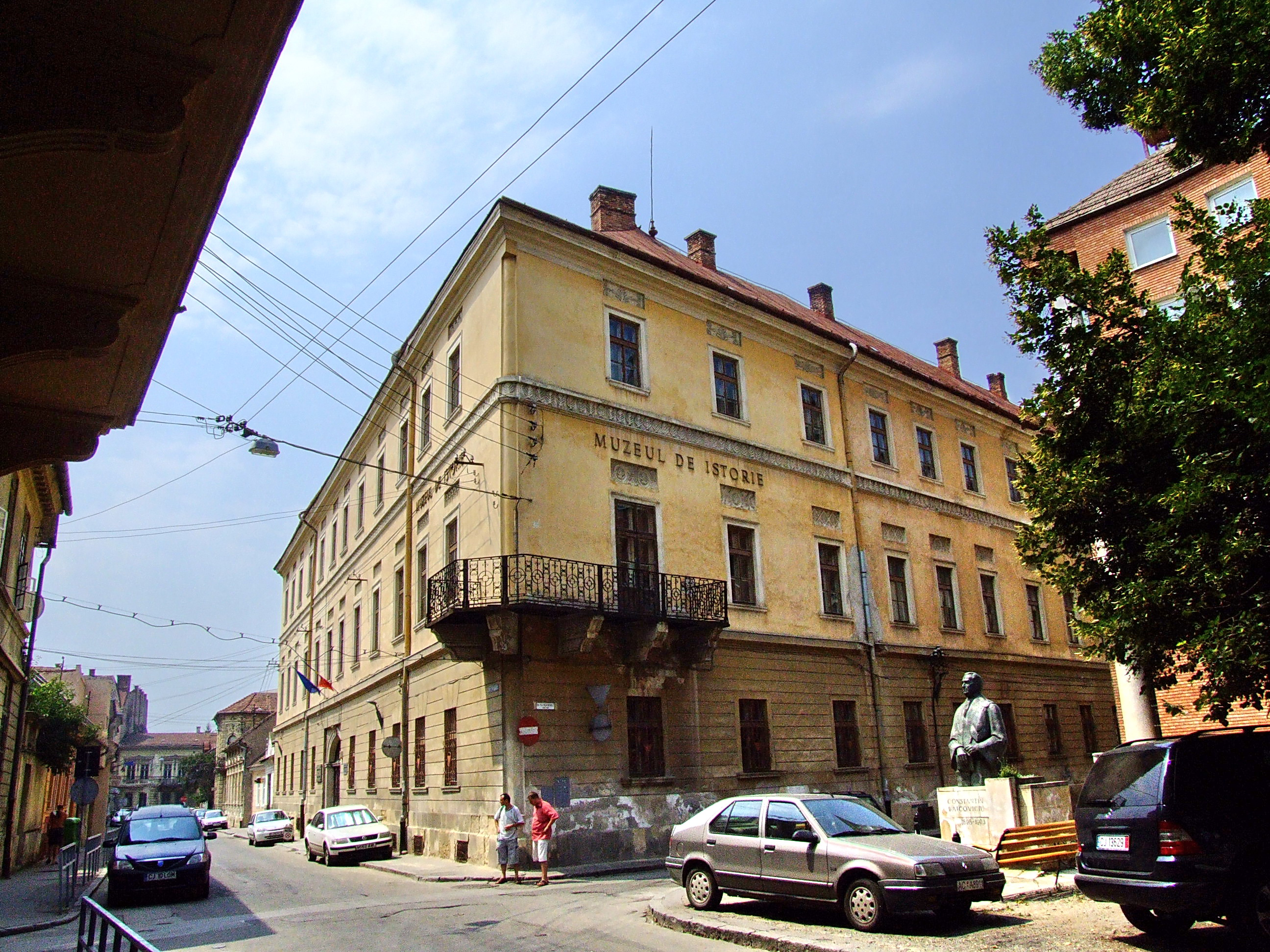
The National Museum of Transylvanian History

Cluj-Napoca hosts an ethnographic museum, the Ethnographic Museum of Transylvania, which features a large indoor collection of traditional cultural objects, as well as an open-air park, the oldest of this kind in Romania, dating back to 1929.

The National Museum of Transylvanian History is another important museum in Cluj-Napoca, containing a collection of artefacts detailing Romanian history and culture from prehistoric times, the Dacian era, medieval times and the modern era. Moreover, the city also preserves a Historic Collection of the Pharmacy, in the building of its first pharmacy (16th century), the Hintz House.

=== Cultural events and festivals ===
Cluj-Napoca hosts a number of cultural festivals of various types. These occur throughout the year, though are more frequent in the summer months. "Sărbătoarea Muzicii" (Fête de la Musique) is a music festival taking place yearly on 21 June in a number of Romanian cities, Cluj-Napoca included, organised under the aegis of the French Cultural Centre. Additionally, Splaiul Independenței, on the banks of Someșul Mic, hosts a number of beer festivals throughout the summer, among them the "Septemberfest", modelled after the German Oktoberfest. In 2015, the city will be the European Youth Capital, an event with a budget of 5.7 million euros that is projected to boost tourism by about a fifth.

The city has seen a number of important music events, including the MTV România Music Award ceremony which was held at the Sala Sporturilor Horia Demian in 2006 with the Sugababes, Pachanga and Uniting Nations as special international guests. In 2007, Beyoncé also performed in Cluj-Napoca, at the Ion Moina Stadium. In 2010, Iron Maiden included the city in their Final Frontier World Tour. The Cluj Arena was inaugurated in 2011 with concerts by Scorpions and Smokie, the main event drawing over 40,000 people; other events followed, for instance Roxette in 2012 and Deep Purple in 2013. Smaller events occur regularly at the Polyvalent Hall, the Opera and the Students' House of Culture. Moreover, the local clubs regularly organise events featuring international artists, usually foreign disc jockeys, like André Tanneberger, Sasha, Timo Maas, Satoshi Tomiie, Yves Larock, Dave Seaman, Plump DJs, Stephane K or Andy Fletcher.

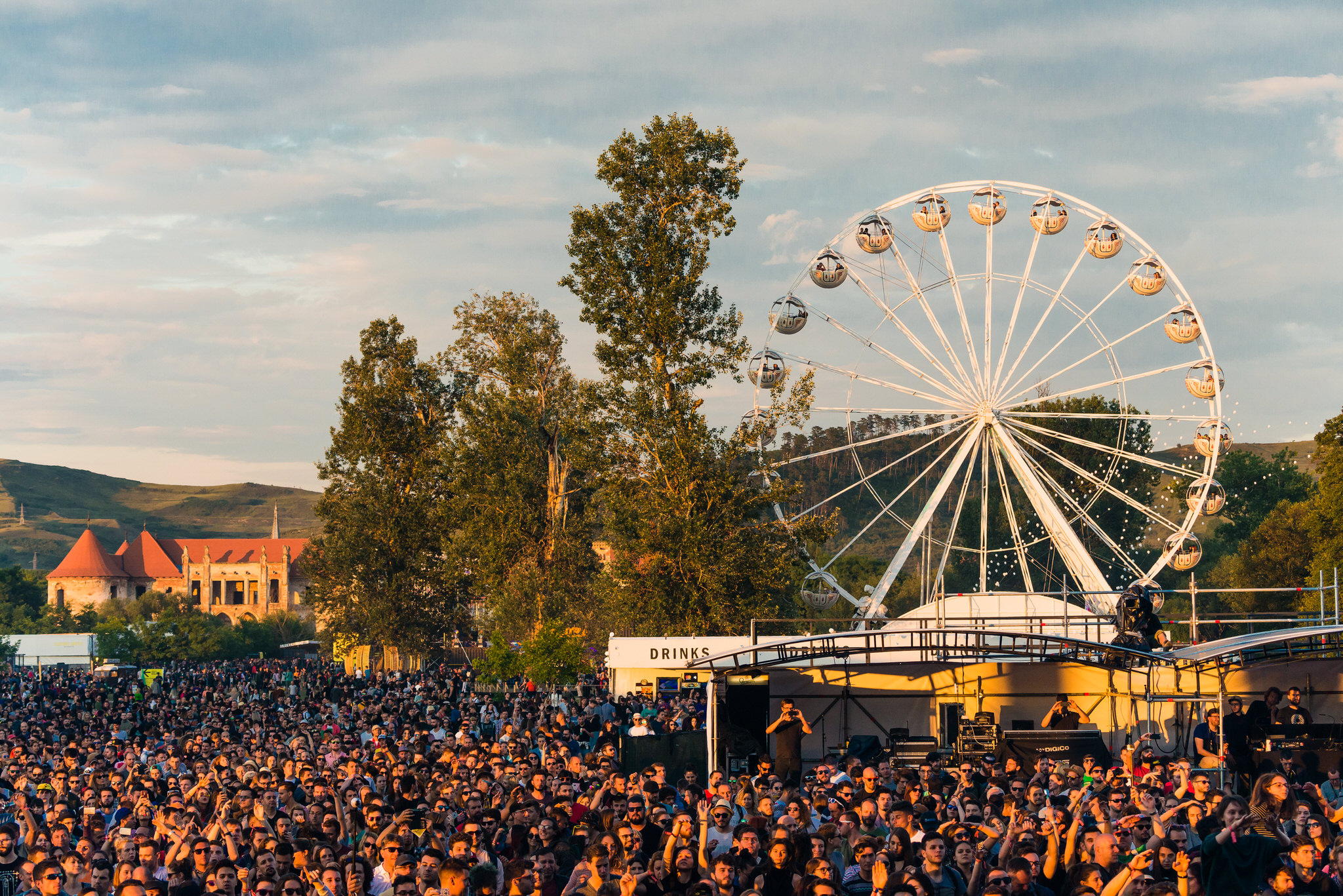
Electric Castle Festival

The Transilvania International Film Festival (TIFF), held in the city since 2001 and organised by the Association for the Promotion of the Romanian Film, is the first Romanian film festival for international features. The festival jury awards the Transilvania Trophy for the best film in competition, as well as prizes for best director, best performance and best photography. With the support of Home Box Office, TIFF also organises a national script contest. Comedy Cluj, which debuted in 2009, is the newest annual film festival organised in Cluj-Napoca.

Toamna Muzicală Clujeană, Romania's most important classical music event after the George Enescu Festival, has taken place annually since 1965, and is run by the Transylvania State Philharmonic Orchestra. A Mozart Festival has taken place annually since 1991. Another annual event, taking place at the Romanian National Opera, is the Opera Ball, established in 1992. Additionally, in 2012, a Festival of National Operas was introduced, which aside from the hometown troupe, also features opera companies from Bucharest, Iași and Timișoara. The Interferences International Theatre Festival, started in 2007, takes place at the Hungarian Theatre.

Also held in the city is Delahoya, Romania's oldest electronic music festival, established in 1997. Electric Castle Festival, which takes place at Bánffy Castle in nearby Bonțida, had an audience of over 30,000 people for its first edition in 2013 and was nominated by European Festivals Awards for the Best New Festival and Best Medium Size Festival awards. By 2016, over 120,000 were in attendance. Untold Festival, which began in 2015, is Romania's largest music festival. Held mainly in the Cluj Arena, and also at the Polyvalent Hall, it drew over 300,000 in its second edition.

== Architecture ==
Cluj-Napoca's salient architecture is primarily Renaissance, Baroque and Gothic. The modern era has also produced a remarkable set of buildings from the mid-century style. The mostly utilitarian Communist-era architecture is also present, although only to a certain extent, as Cluj-Napoca never faced a large systematisation programme. Of late, the city has seen significant growth in contemporary structures such as skyscrapers and office buildings, mainly constructed after 2000.

=== Historical architecture ===
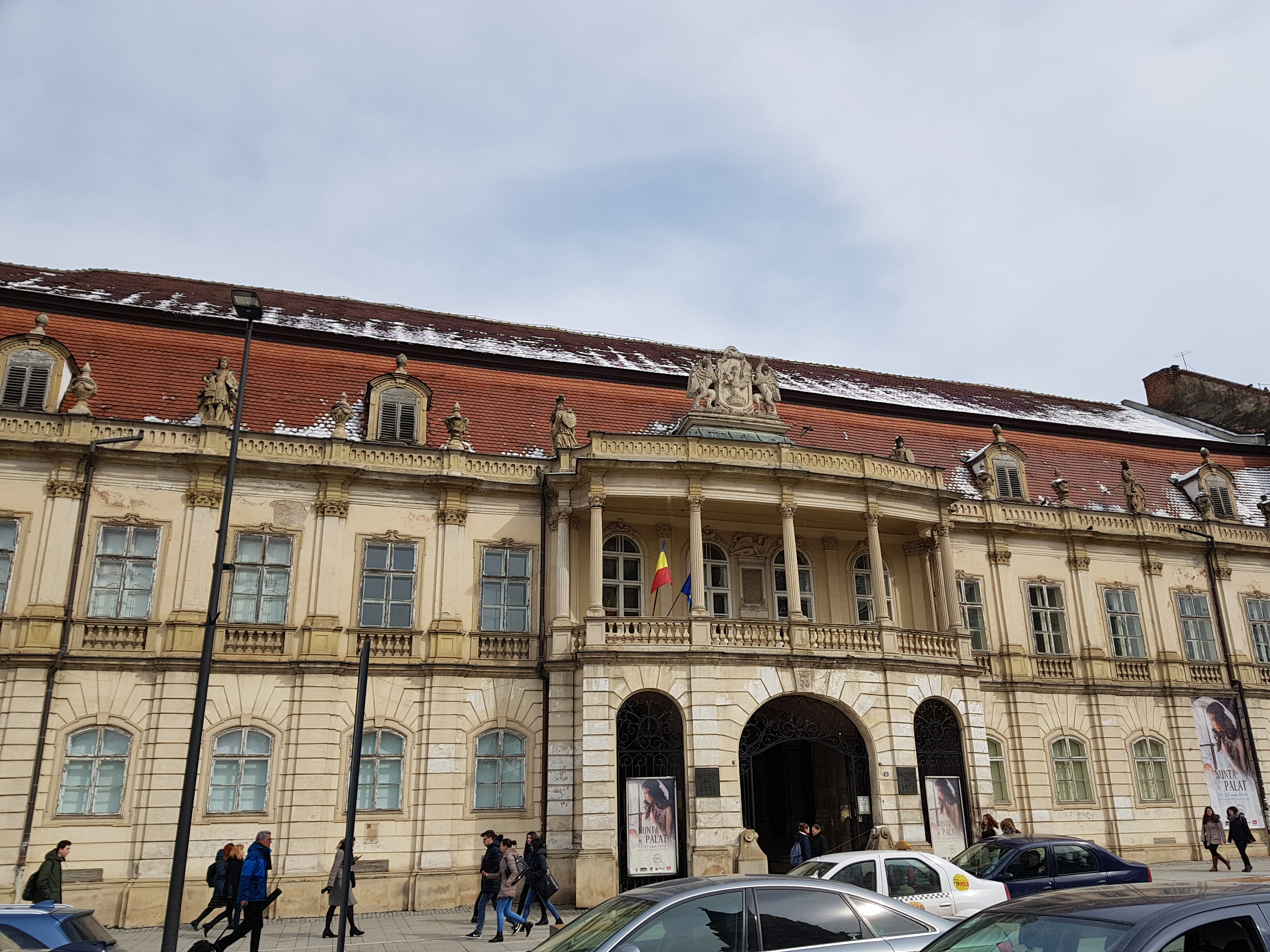
Bánffy Palace

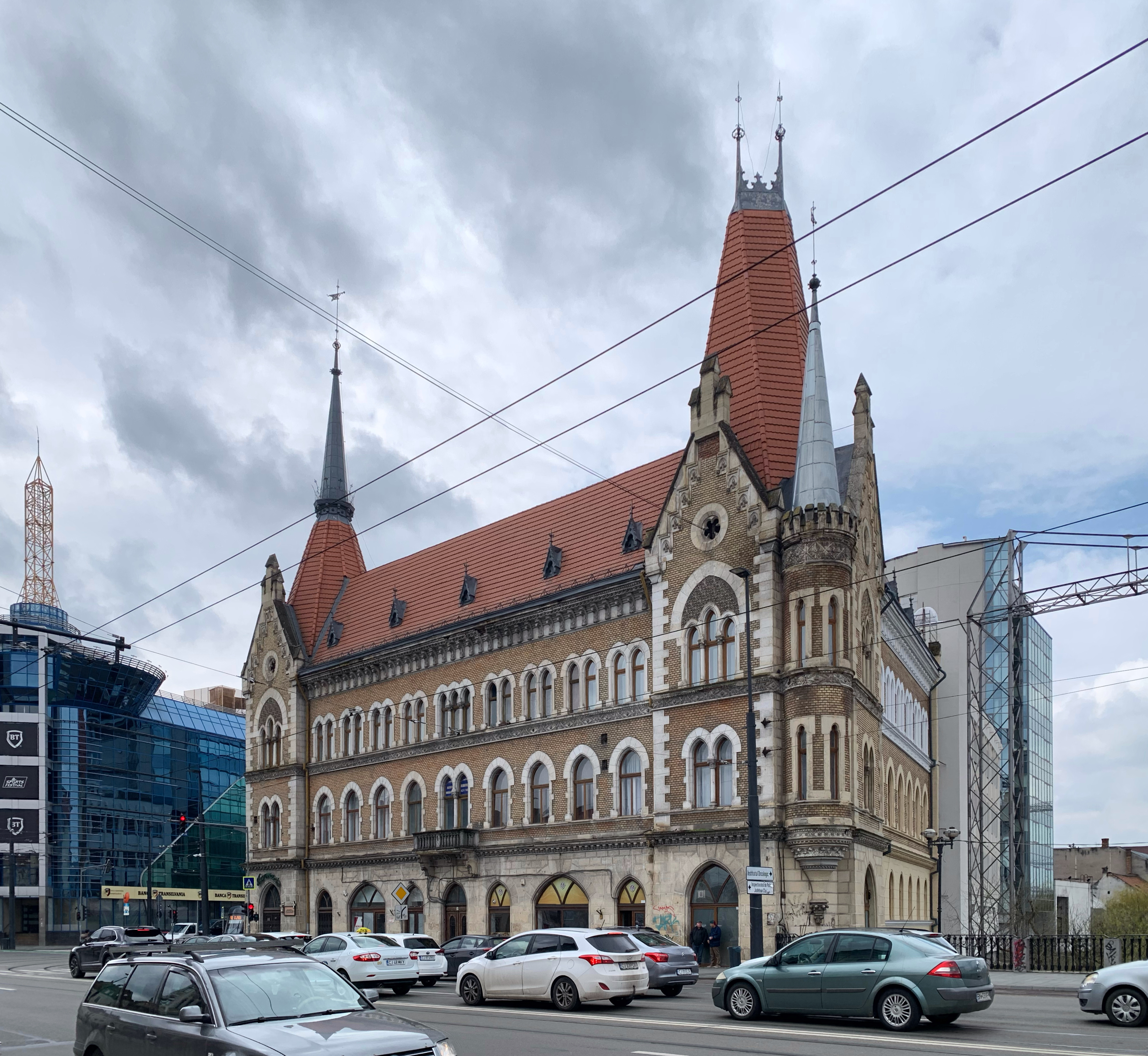
Széki Palace

The nucleus of the old city, an important cultural and commercial centre, used to be a military camp, attested in documents with the name "castrum Clus".

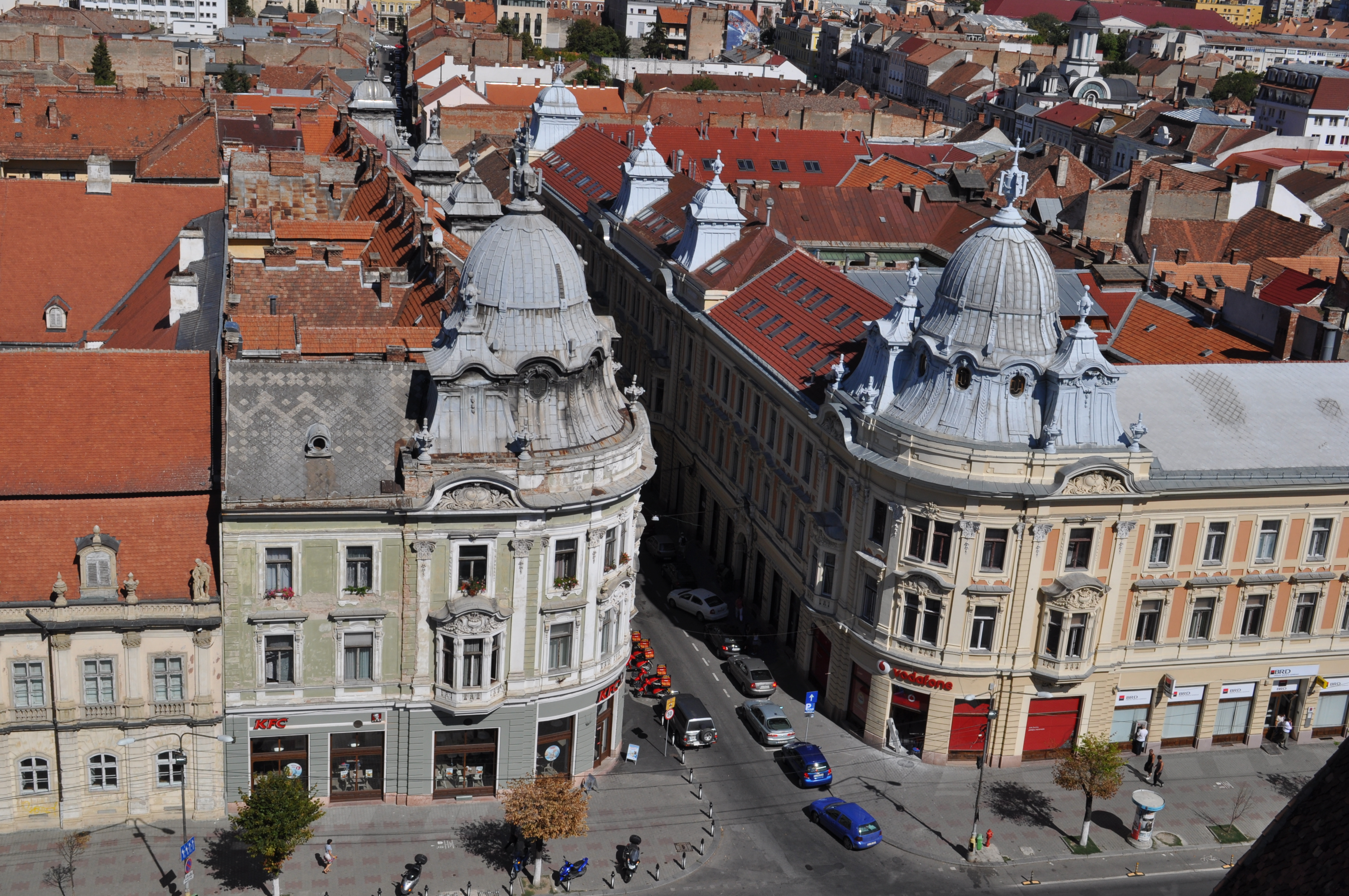
Iuliu Maniu Street: construction of this symmetrical street was undertaken during the 19th century.

The oldest residence in Cluj-Napoca is the Matthias Corvinus House, originally a Gothic structure that bears Transylvanian Renaissance characteristics due to a later renovation. Such changes feature on other Hungarian townspeople's residences, built from the mid-15th century mostly of stone and wood with a cellar, ground floor and upper storey, in the Late Gothic and Renaissance styles; although the late medieval houses have often been considerably altered, the street façades of the old town are mostly preserved. St. Michael's Church, the oldest and most representative Gothic-style building in the country, dates back to the 14th century. The oldest of its sections is the altar, dedicated in 1390, while the newest part is the clock tower, which was built in Gothic Revival style (1860).

As Renaissance styles survived late in the city, the appearance of Baroque art was also delayed, but from the mid-18th century Klausenburg was once again at the centre of the development and spread of art in Transylvania, as it had been two centuries earlier. The first enthusiasts for Baroque were the Catholic Church and the landed aristocracy. Artists came initially from south Germany and Austria, but by the end of the century most of the work was by local craftsmen. The earliest signs of the new style appear in the furnishings of St. Michael's church: the altarpieces and pulpit, which date to the 1740s, are carved, painted and richly decorated with figures. An altarpiece depicting the Adoration of the Magi (1748–50) is the work of Franz Anton Maulbertsch. The earliest two-towered Baroque church was built by the Jesuits from 1718 to 1724 on the pattern of Košice and was later handed over to the Piarists. During the century more simply designed Baroque churches were built for the mendicant orders, Lutherans, Unitarians and the Orthodox Church. The noble families built houses and even palaces in the old town. The Baroque Bánffy Palace (1774–1785), constructed around a rectangular yard, is the masterpiece of Eberhardt Blaumann. Its peculiarity lies in the appearance of the principal façade.

Both Avram Iancu and Unrii Squares feature ensembles of eclectic and baroque–rococo architecture, including the Palace of Justice, the Theatre, the Iuliu Maniu symmetrical street, and the New York Palace, among others. In the 19th century many houses were built in the Neo-classical, Romantic and Eclectic styles. Also dating to that period are the two-towered Neo-classical Calvinist church (1829–50), its new college building of 1801, and the City Hall (1843–46) in the marketplace, by Antal Kagerbauer.

The banks of the Someșul Mic also feature a wide variety of such old buildings. The end of the 19th century brought a building ensemble that fastens the corners of the oldest bridge over the river, at the north end of the Regele Ferdinand Avenue. The Berde, Babos, Elian, Urania, and Széki palaces consist of a mixture of Baroque, Renaissance and Gothic styles, following the Art Nouveau/Secession and Revival specifics.

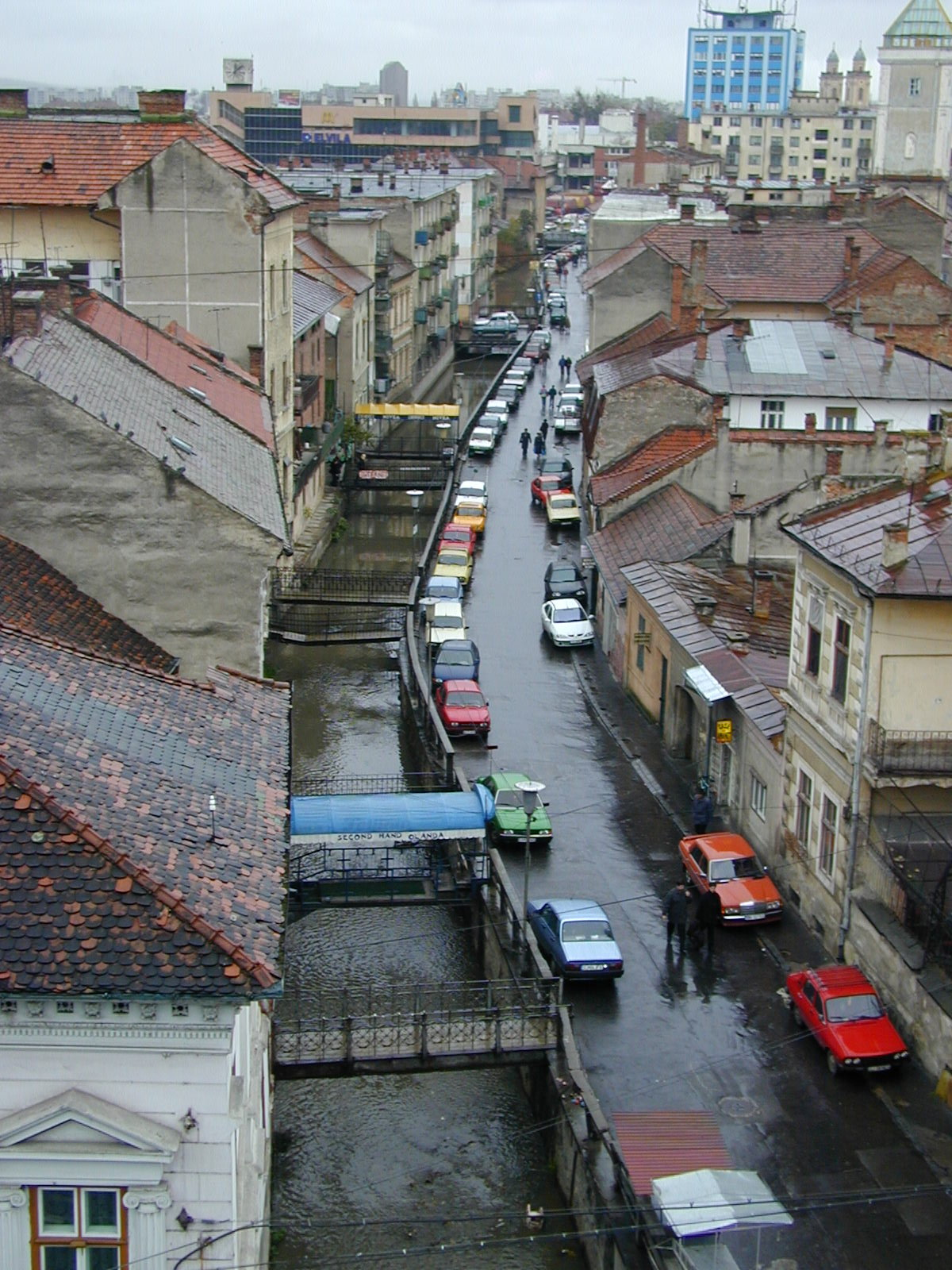
The 17th century Canalul Morii

In the 2000s, the old city centre underwent extensive restoration works, meant to convert much of it into a pedestrian area, including Bulevardul Eroilor, Unirii Square and other smaller streets. In some residential areas of the city, particularly the high-income southern areas, like Andrei Mureșanu or Strada Republicii, there are many turn-of-the-century villas.

=== Modern and Communist architecture ===
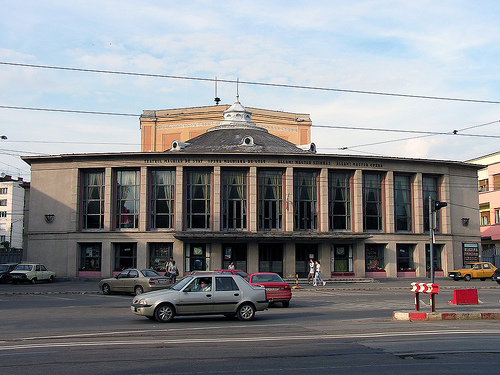
Hungarian State Theatre and Opera

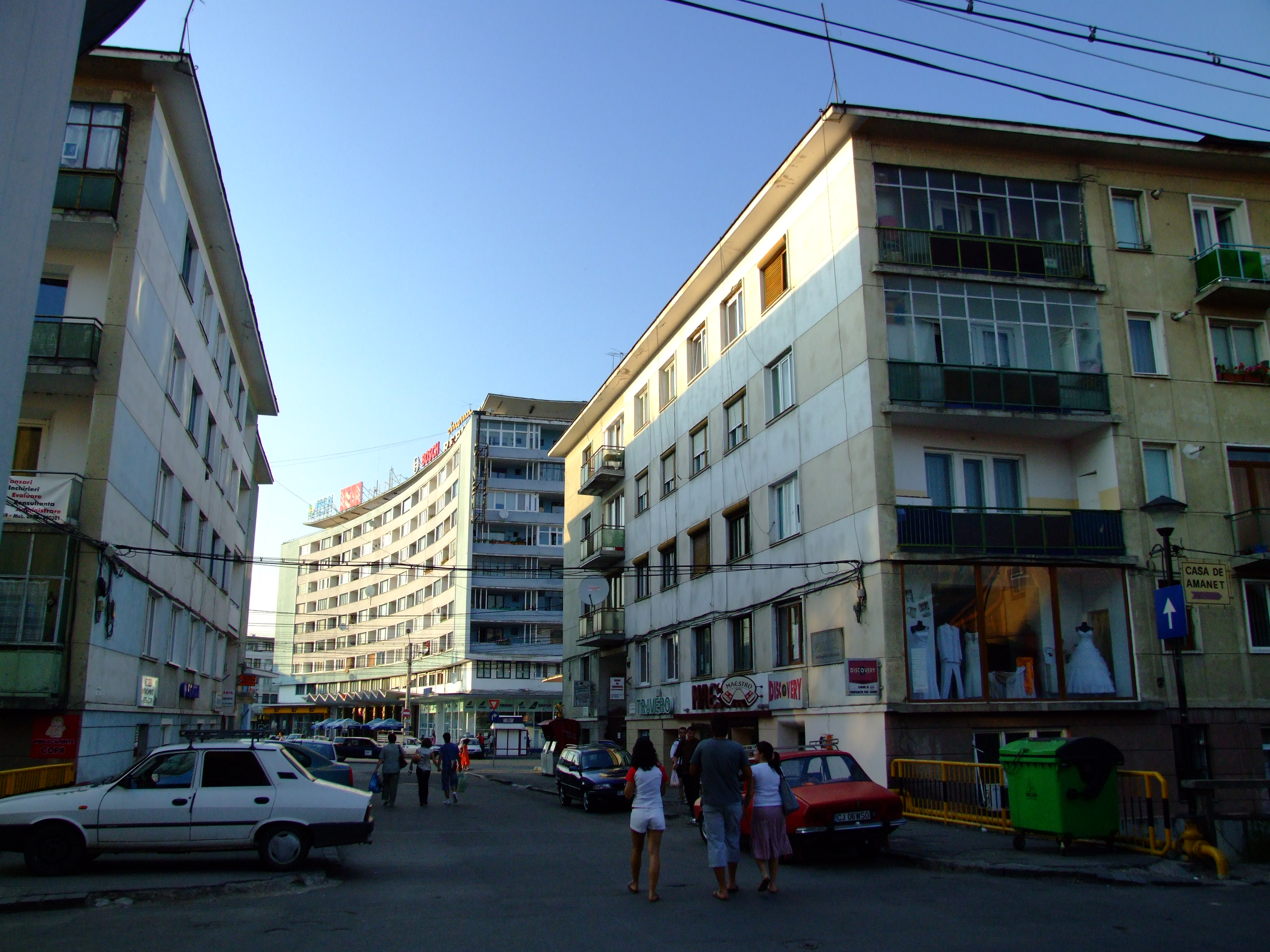
Blocks of flats in central Cluj-Napoca

Part of Cluj-Napoca's architecture is made up of buildings constructed during the Communist era, when historical architecture was replaced with "more efficient" high-density apartment blocks. Nicolae Ceaușescu's project of systematisation did not really affect the historical old town, instead reaching the marginal, shoddily built districts surrounding it.

Still, the centre hosts some examples of modern architecture dating back to the Communist era. The Hungarian Theatre building was erected at the beginning of the 20th century, but underwent an avant-garde renovation in 1961, when it acquired a modernist style of architecture. Another example of modernist architectural art is Palatul Telefoanelor, situated in the vicinity of Mihai Viteazul Square, an area that also features a complex of large apartment buildings.

Some outer districts, especially Mănăștur, and to a certain extent Gheorgheni and Grigorescu, consist mainly of such large apartment ensembles.

=== Contemporary architecture ===
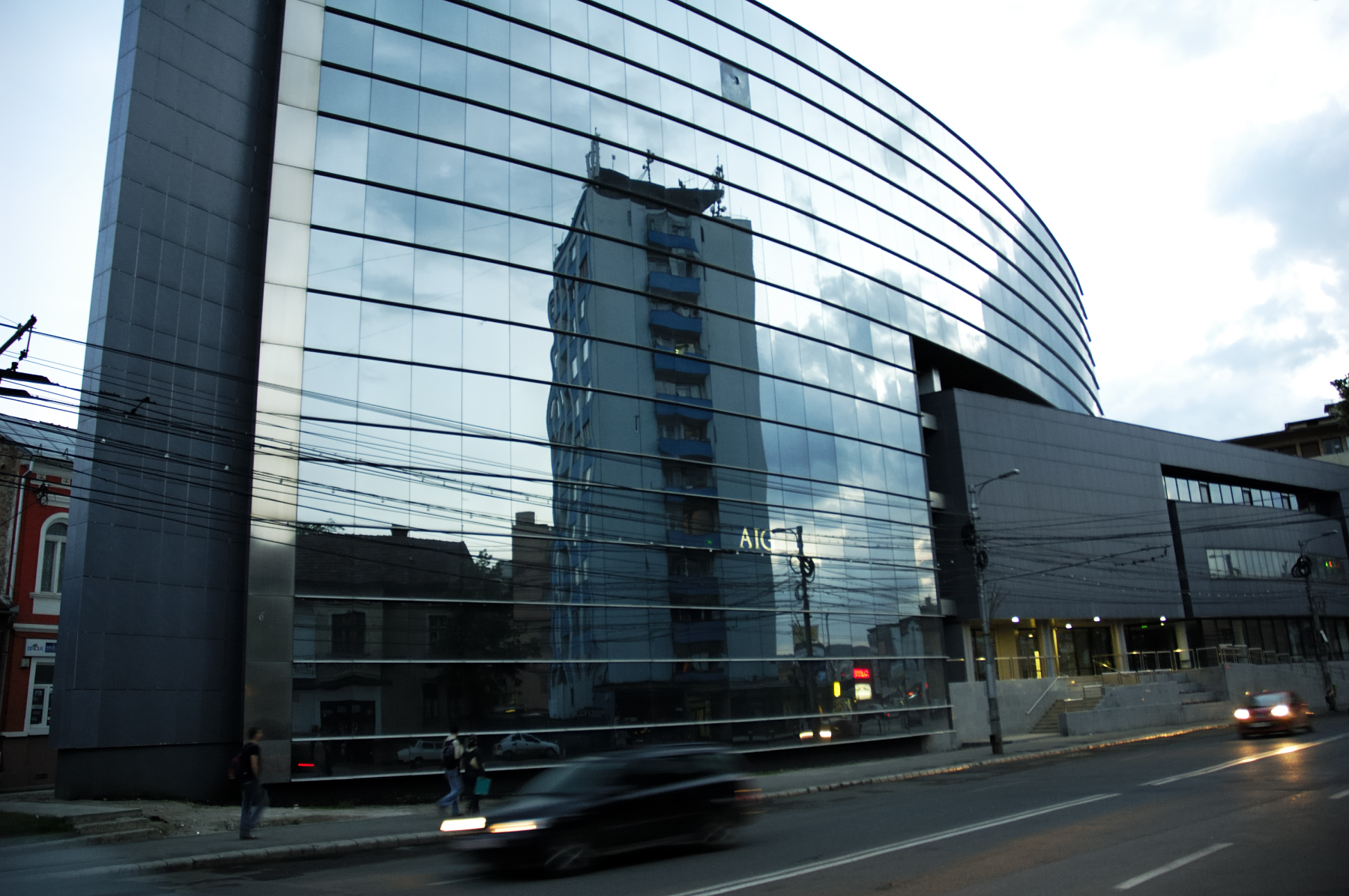
City Business Center, dubbed the "biscuit building", is an office building in central Cluj-Napoca.

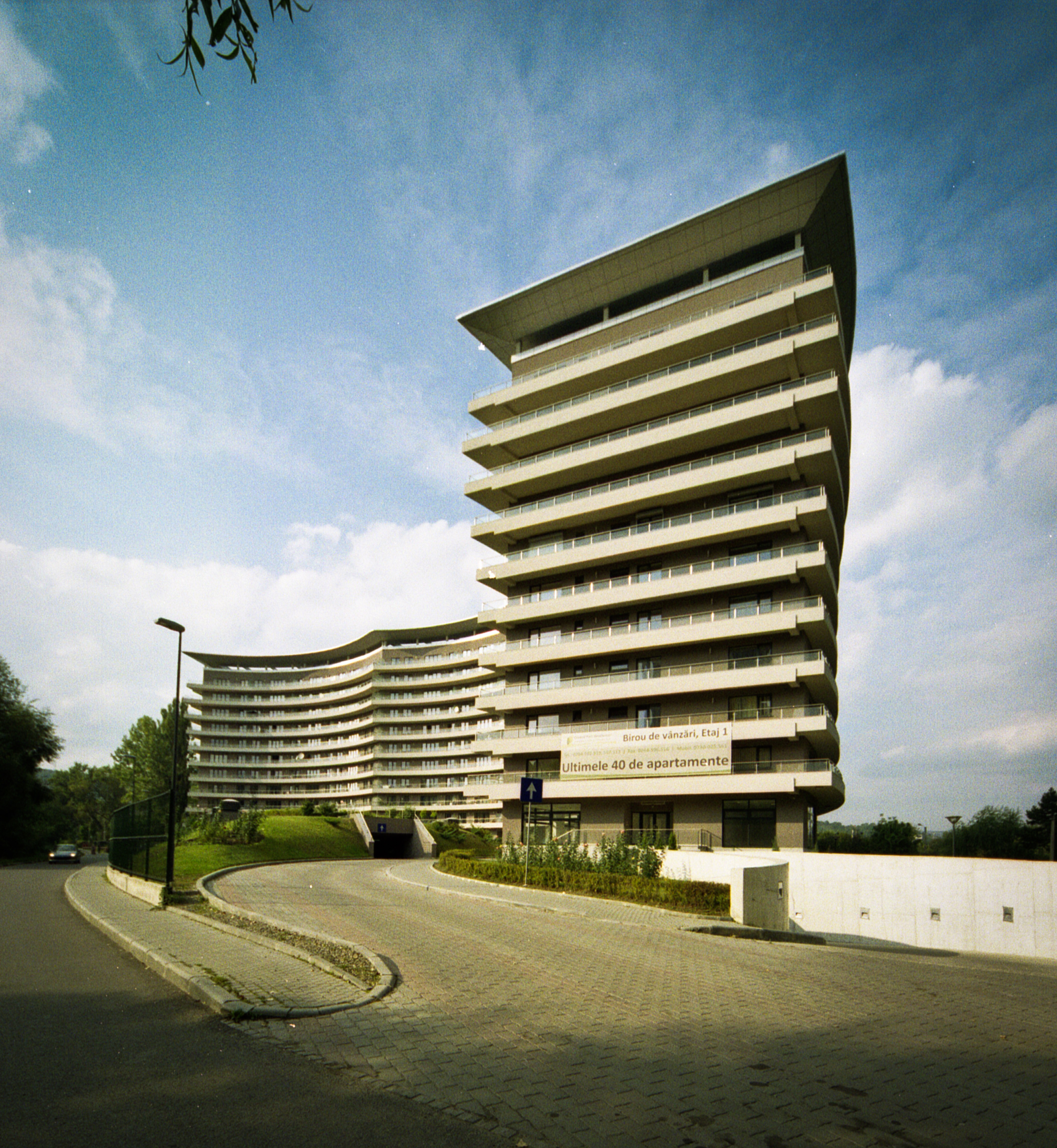
Modern residential building in Plopilor Vest

Since 1989, modern skyscrapers and glass-fronted buildings have altered the skyline of Cluj-Napoca. Buildings from this time are mostly made out of glass and steel, and are usually high-rise. Examples include shopping malls (particularly the Iulius Mall), office buildings and bank headquarters. Of this last, regional headquarters of the Banca Română pentru Dezvoltare is the tallest office building in Cluj-Napoca, with 50 metres (160 ft). Its twelve storeys were completed in 1997 after 4 years of work and house offices for the bank and for divisions of several other companies, including insurance and oil companies.

Another architecturally interesting building is the so-called "Clădirea biscuite" (the biscuit building). This building was supposed to house the local headquarters of the Banca Agricolă (Agricultural Bank), but entered in the custody of the city due to the failure of that bank in the 1990s and its subsequent purchase by the Raiffeisen Bank, to be eventually converted in an office building.

The headquarters of Banca Transilvania, at the intersection of Regele Ferdinand Avenue and Barițiu Street, is also a large contemporary building and was originally constructed to host the regional offices of Romtelecom, the public phone company, but was later sold to the bank.

Cluj-Napoca is undergoing a period of architectural revitalisation that is set to bring the manner of expansion to the vertical. A financial centre, containing a tower of 15 storeys, is slated for completion in 2010 on Ploiești Street. Two 35-storey twin towers are projected to be constructed in the Sigma area in Zorilor, while the Florești area will host a complex of three towers with 32 levels each. As of February 2020, the aforementioned projects were never completed or were postponed indefinitely.

== Transport ==
Cluj-Napoca has a complex system of regional transportation, providing road, air and rail connections to major cities in Romania and Europe. It also features a public transportation system consisting of bus, trolleybus and tram lines.

=== Road ===
Cluj-Napoca is an important node in the European road network, being on three different European routes (E60, E81 and E576). At a national level, Cluj-Napoca is located on three different main national roads: DN1, DN1C and DN1F. The Romanian Motorway A3, also known as Transylvania Motorway (Autostrada Transilvania), currently under construction, will link the city with Bucharest and Romania's western border. The 2B section between Câmpia Turzii and Cluj Vest (Gilău) opened in late 2010. The Cluj-Napoca Coach Station (Autogara) is used by several private transport companies to provide coach connections from Cluj-Napoca to a large number of locations from all over the country.

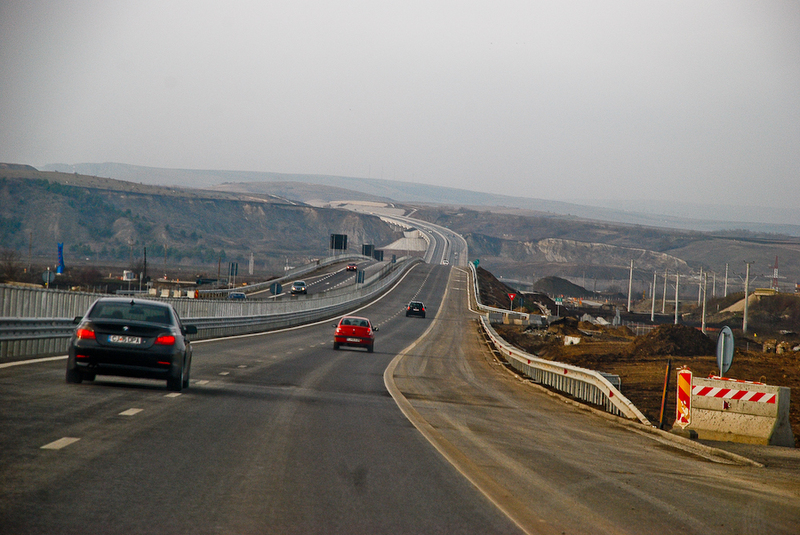
A3 motorway near Cluj-Napoca

The number of automobiles licensed in Cluj-Napoca is estimated at 175,000. As of 2007, Cluj County ranks sixth nationwide according to the cars sold during that year, with 12,679 units, corresponding to a four percent share. One tenth of these cars were limousines or SUVs. Some 3,300 taxis are also licensed to operate in Cluj-Napoca.

=== Air ===
The Cluj International Airport (CLJ), located 9 kilometres (5.6 mi) to the east of the city centre, is the second busiest airport in Romania, after Bucharest's OTP, handling over 1.4 million passengers in 2015. Situated on the European route E576 (Cluj-Napoca–Dej), the airport is connected to the city centre by the local public transport company, CTP, bus number 8 and trolley number 5. The airport serves various direct international destinations across Europe. In 2016, a 42 m-high control tower will be inaugurated on the site of the old tower, built in the 1960s. The new control tower will be one of the most modern in the country.

=== Rail ===
Cluj-Napoca Rail Station, located about 2 kilometres (1.2 mi) north of the city centre, is situated on the CFR-Romanian Railways Main Line 300 (Bucharest – Oradea – Romanian Western Border) and on Line 401 (Cluj-Napoca – Dej). CFR provides direct rail connections to all the major Romanian cities and to Budapest. The rail station is very well connected to all parts of the city by the trams, trolleybuses and buses of the local public transport company, CTP.

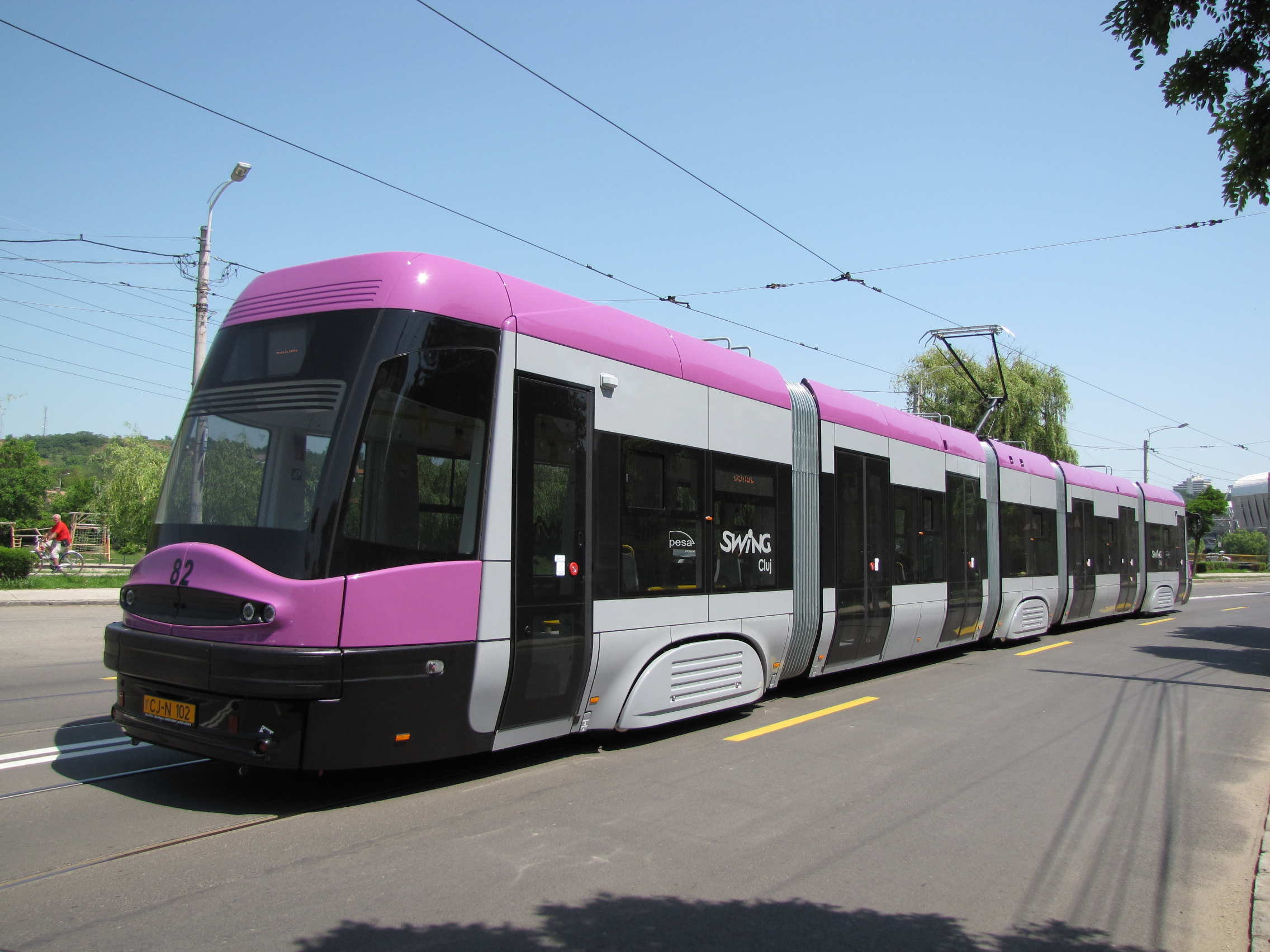
A PESA Swing tram on Splaiul Independenței

The city is also served by two other secondary rail stations, the Little Station (Gara Mică), which is technically part of and situated immediately near the main station, and Cluj-Napoca East (Est). There is also a cargo station, Halta "Clujana".

=== Public transport ===
CTP, the local public transport company, runs an extensive 321 kilometres (199 mi) public transport network within the city using 5 tram lines, 12 trolleybus lines and 51 bus routes. Transport in the Cluj-Napoca metropolitan area is also covered by a number of private bus companies, such as Fany and MV Trans 2007, providing connections to neighboring towns and villages.

==== Trams ====
The local transportation company, CTP, manages a tram line that runs through the city. Planned modernisation will involve the installation of new rail tracks and the separation of the tram route from road traffic. This will bring a number of advantages, including vibration and shock reduction, a substantial noise decrease, long use expectancy and higher transit speed – 60 to 80 km/h (37 to 50 mph). The route will undergo major alteration on Horea Street, between the Chamber of Commerce and the central rail station, a rather problematic area. This dilemma should be solved either with the relocation of the track next to the sidewalk, or through the construction of a suspended tunnel. Another area that will benefit from large-scale changes is "Splaiul Independenței", where the tracks will be pulled back to the Central Park, so that the roadway can host two lanes. In the Mănăștur area, under the bridge, the tracks will be brought closer, while other major works will executed on the traffic circle on Primăverii Street. Given the development of the metropolitan area, further plans feature the creation of a light rail track between Gilău and Jucu that will use these modernised tracks in the city.

==== Metro ====
In late 2018, studies began for a proposed Cluj-Napoca Metro, continuing into 2020. In February 2023, the design and execution works for Line I of the metro were awarded to the Gülermak – Alstom Transport – Arcada Company. The total duration of the contract is estimated at 96 months.

== Culture and media ==
Cluj-Napoca is an important centre for Transylvanian mass media, since it is the headquarters of all regional television networks, newspapers and radio stations. The largest daily newspapers published in Bucharest are usually reissued from Cluj-Napoca in a regional version, covering Transylvanian issues. Such newspapers include România Liberă, Gardianul, Ziarul Financiar, ProSport and Gazeta Sporturilor. Ringier edited a regional version of Evenimentul Zilei in Cluj-Napoca until 2008, when it decided to close this enterprise.

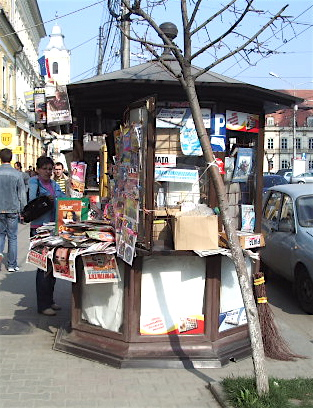
A newspaper kiosk in the central area

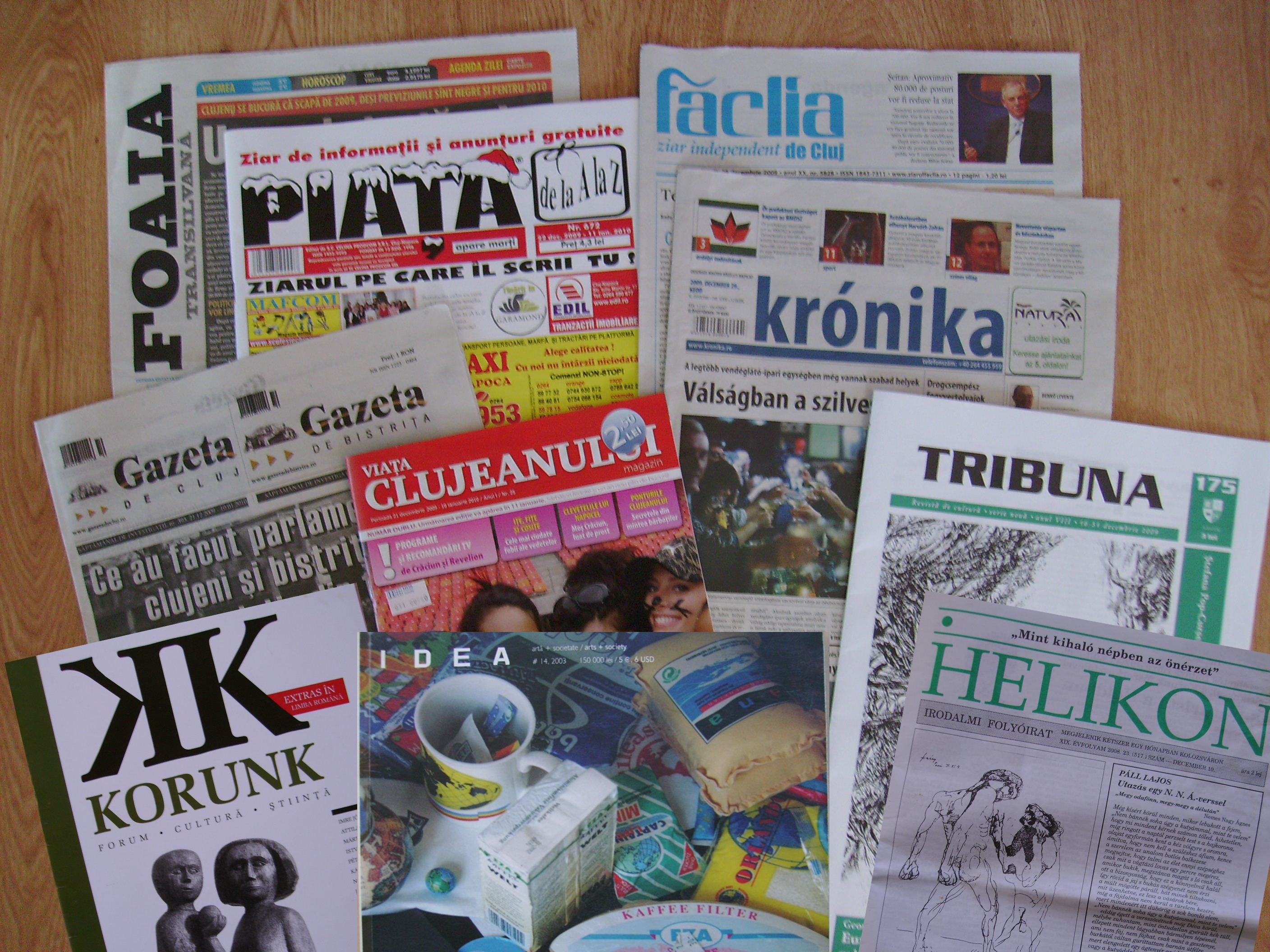
Hungarian- and Romanian-language newspapers published in Cluj-Napoca

Apart from the regional editions, which are distributed throughout Transylvania, the national newspaper Ziua also runs a local franchise, Ziua de Cluj, that acts as a local daily, available only within city limits. Cluj-Napoca also boasts other newspapers of local interest, like Făclia and Monitorul de Cluj, as well as two free dailies, Informația Cluj and Cluj Expres. Clujeanul, the first of a series of local weeklies edited by the media trust CME, is one of the largest newspapers in Transylvania, with an audience of 53,000 readers per edition. This weekly has a daily online version, entitled Clujeanul, ediție online, updated on a real-time basis. Cluj-Napoca is also the centre of the Romanian Hungarian-language press. The city hosts the editorial offices of the two largest newspapers of this kind, Krónika and Szabadság, as well as those of the magazines Erdélyi Napló and Korunk. Săptămâna Clujeană is an economic weekly published in the city, that also issues two magazines on successful local people and companies (Oameni de Succes and Companii de Succes) every year, while Piața A-Z is a newspaper for announcements and advertisements distributed throughout Transylvania. Cluj had an active press in the interwar period as well: publications included the Zionist newspaper Új Kelet, the official party organs Keleti Újság (for the Magyar Party) and Patria (for the National Peasants' Party); and the nationalist Conștiința Românească and Țara Noastră, the latter a magazine directed by Octavian Goga. Under Communism, publications included the socio-political and literary magazines Tribuna, Steaua, Utunk, Korunk, Napsugár and Előre as well as the regional Communist party daily organs Făclia and Igazság and the trilingual student magazine Echinox.

Among the local television stations in the city, TVR Cluj (public) and One TV (private) broadcast regionally, while the others are restricted to the metropolitan area. Napoca Cable Network is available through cable, and broadcasts local content throughout the day. Other stations work as affiliates of national TV stations, only providing the audience with local reports in addition to the national programming. This situation is mirrored in the radio broadcasting companies: except for Radio Cluj, Radio Impuls and the Hungarian-language Paprika Rádió, all other stations are local affiliates of the national broadcasters. Casa Radio, situated on Donath Street, is one of the modern landmarks of the media and communications industry; it is, however, not the only one: Palatul Telefoanelor ("the telephone palace") is also a major modernist symbol of communications in the city centre.

Magazines published in Cluj-Napoca include HR Journal, a publication discussing human resources issues, J'Adore, a local shopping magazine that is also franchised in Bucharest, Maximum Rock Magazine, dealing with the rock music industry, RDV, a national hunting publication and Cluj-Napoca WWW, an English-language magazine designed for tourists. Cultural and social events as well as all other entertainment sources are the leading subjects of such magazines as Șapte Seri and CJ24FUN.

In the early 20th century, film production in Kolozsvár, led by Jenő Janovics, was the chief alternative to Budapest. The first film made in the city, in association with the Parisian producer Pathé, was Sárga csikó ("Yellow Foal", 1912), based on a popular "peasant drama". Yellow Foal became the first worldwide Hungarian success, distributed abroad under the title The Secret of the Blind Man: 137 prints were sold internationally and the movie was even screened in Japan.

The first artistically prestigious film in the annals of Hungarian cinematography was also produced on this site, based on a national classic, Bánk bán (1914), a tragedy written by József Katona.

Later, the city was the production site of the 1991 Romanian drama Undeva în Est ("Somewhere in the East"), and the 1995 Hungarian-language film A Részleg ("Outpost"). Moreover, the Romanian-language film Cartier ("Neighbourhood", 2001) and its sequel Înapoi în cartier ("Back to the Neighbourhood", 2006) both feature a story replete with violence and rude language, behind the blocks in the city's Mănăștur district. This district is also mentioned in the lyrics to the song Înapoi în cartier by La Familia member Puya, featured on the soundtrack of the motion picture.

Documentary and mockumentary productions set in the city include Irshad Ashraf's St. Richard of Austin, a tribute to the American film director Richard Linklater, and Cluj-Napocolonia, a mockumentary imagining a fabulous city of the future.

== Education ==
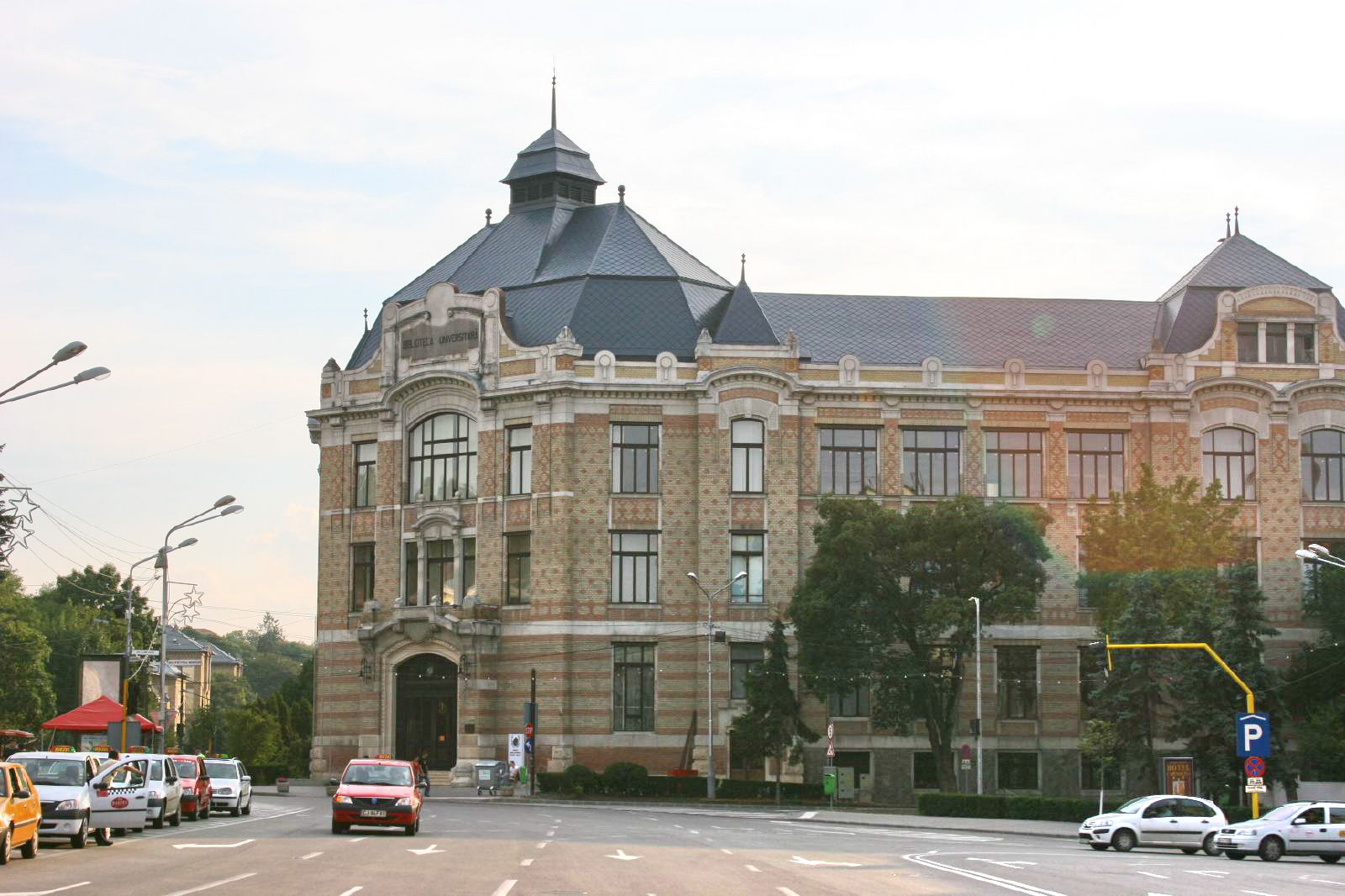
The Central University Library

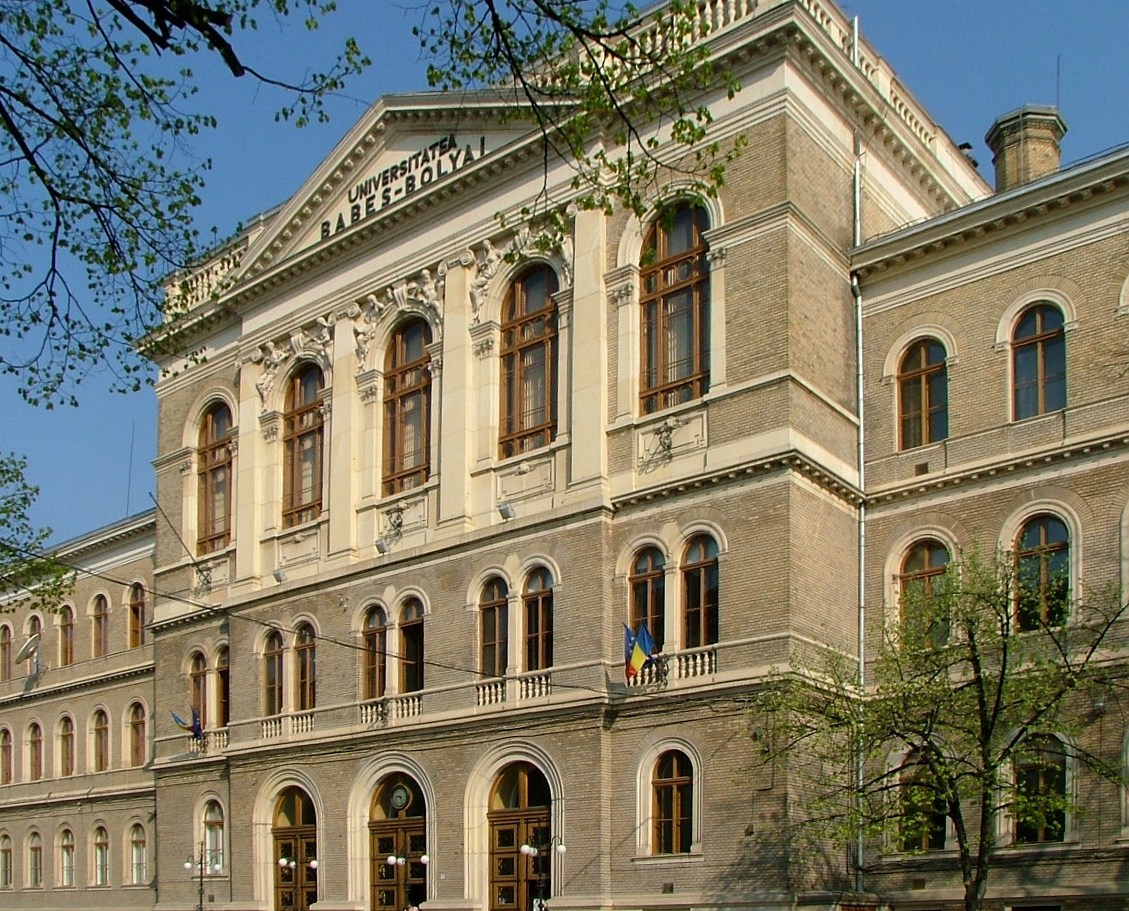
The main building of Babeș-Bolyai University

Higher education has a long tradition in Cluj-Napoca. The Babeș-Bolyai University (UBB) is the largest in the country, with approximately 50,000 students attending various specialisations in Romanian, Hungarian, German and English. Its name commemorates two important Transylvanian figures, the Romanian physician Victor Babeș and the Hungarian mathematician János Bolyai. The university claims roots as far back as 1581, when a Jesuit college opened in Cluj, but it was in 1872 that emperor Franz Joseph founded the University of Cluj, later renamed the Franz Joseph University (József Ferenc Tudományegyetem). During 1919, immediately after the end of World War I, the university was moved to Budapest, where it stayed until 1921, after which it was moved to the Hungarian city of Szeged. Briefly, it returned to Cluj in the first half of the 1940s, when the city came back under Hungarian administration, but it was again relocated in Szeged, following the reincorporation of Cluj into Romanian territory. The Romanian branch acquired the name Babeș; a Hungarian university, Bolyai, was established in 1945, and the two were merged in 1959. The city also hosts nine other universities, among them the Technical University, the Iuliu Hațieganu University of Medicine and Pharmacy, the University of Agricultural Sciences and Veterinary Medicine of Cluj-Napoca (USAMV), the University of Arts and Design, the Gheorghe Dima Music Academy and other private universities and educational institutes.

The first mention of public education provided in the city dates back to 1409, namely the caption "Caspar notarius et rector scholarum" ("Caspar secretary and director of schools"). Concomitantly, a Catholic school founded during the 14th century also functioned in the city. Today, close to 150 pre-university educational institutions operate in Cluj-Napoca, including 62 kindergartens, 30 primary schools and 45 high schools. Their activity is supervised by the County Board for Education. Most schools teach in Romanian, but there are some Hungarian-language schools (Báthory István, Apáczai Csere János and Brassai Sámuel high schools), as well as mixed schools—e.g., George Coșbuc and Onisifor Ghibu high schools with Romanian/German classes and Romanian/Hungarian classes, respectively. Statistics show that 18,208 students were enrolled in the city's secondary school system during the 1993–94 school year, while a further 7,660 attended one of the 18 professional schools. In the same year, another 37,111 pupils and 9,711 children were registered for primary and pre-school, respectively.

== Sports ==
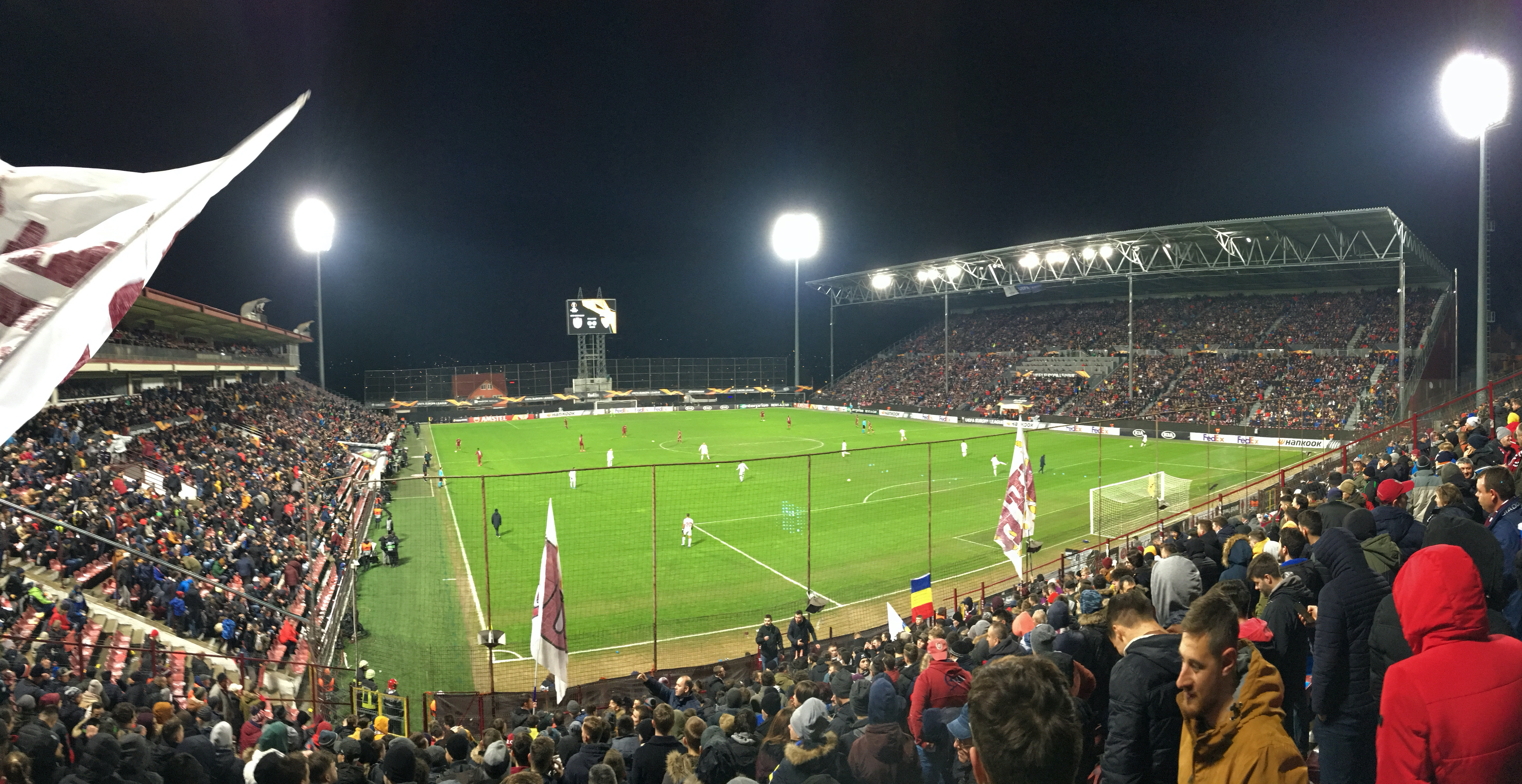
CFR Cluj vs. Sevilla, in the Round of 32 of the 2019–20 UEFA Europa League in February 2020 at Stadionul Dr. Constantin Rădulescu

Football in the city features four clubs playing in the leagues organised by the Romanian Football Federation, in Liga 1—formerly Divizia A—the top division in the Romanian football association, liga II and liga III.

CFR 1907 Cluj-Napoca (founded in 1907) is one of the oldest established teams in the Romanian Championship. It has eight Romanian championship titles 2008, 2010, 2012, 2018, 2019, 2020, 2021, 2022 and four Romanian Cups 2008, 2009, 2010, and 2016 as well as four Supercupa Romaniei in 2009, 2010, 2018, and 2020. It succeeded in winning a league and cup double first time in its history during 2007–2008 season and again in the 2009–2010 season.

The FC Universitatea Cluj football team was founded in 1919, and its greatest success ever was the 1965 Romanian Cup. They were also the runner-ups in liga I in the 1932-1933 season and in Cupa Ligii in 1998.

The city is also represented in the third league, through CS Sănătatea Cluj-Napoca, founded in 1986. This team, which has the Victoria Someșeni Stadium as its home ground, reached the quarter-finals of the Romanian Cup during the 2007–2008 season, its best performance.

FCU Olimpia Cluj is the local women's soccer team, established in 2010 by Babeș-Bolyai University. The team won the Liga I 10 times, and Romanian Cup 6 times.

Cluj Arena, opened in 2011

Cluj Arena, home ground of "U" Cluj, is the largest stadium in Cluj-Napoca (capacity 30,201), and is ranked as an UEFA Elite stadium. The next largest stadium (23,500 seats) is the Dr. Constantin Rădulescu Stadium, home field of the CFR Cluj football team, located in Gruia. This stadium has undergone major refurbishment, featuring up-to-date lighting for night games and automated lawn irrigation, and is due to undergo still further modernisation with the construction of new seating.

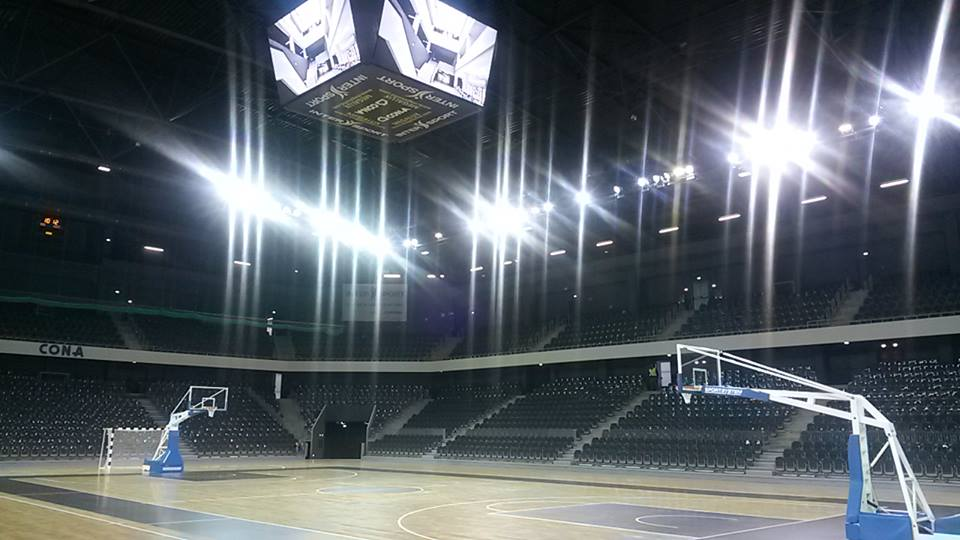
BT Arena

"Universitatea" club also incorporates teams in sports such as rugby union, basketball (with the successful men's basketball team, U-BT), handball and volleyball. The city also features three water polo teams, as recognised by the Romanian Water Polo Federation: CSS Viitorul, CS Voința and Poli CSM. Facilities for such sports are located in the vicinity of the stadium, including BT Arena sports hall opened in 2014 with a capacity of 9300 seats (10000 during concerts), the Sala Sporturilor Horia Demian, a multi-functional hall designed for sports like handball, basketball or volleyball, the Politehnica Swimming Complex, which includes indoor and open-air swimming pools, as well as the Iuliu Hațieganu Park – with tennis and track facilities and a new swimming pool under construction. Cluj-Napoca regularly organises national championships in different sports because of this large concentration of facilities.

In the automotive field, Cluj-Napoca hosts two stages in the National Rally Championship. Raliul Clujului is held in June; the Avram Iancu Rally, held in September, has been officially organised since 1975, though there were several years when it was not held. The latter rally begins in Cipariu Square and runs across the surroundings of the city.

Amateur athletes are also active in Cluj-Napoca, with swimming pools, miniature golf courses, tennis courts, paintball arenas and bikeways available, as well as skiing, bobsledding, skating, caving, hiking, hunting, fishing and extreme sports in the vicinity. April 2011 saw the first annual edition of the Cluj International Marathon, a competition that takes place in the city centre's streets.

== Twin towns – sister cities ==
Cluj-Napoca is twinned with:

- Dijon, France (1965)
- Nantes, France (1990)
- Zagreb, Croatia (1976)
- Cologne, Germany (1976)
- Pécs, Hungary (1990)
- Beersheba, Israel (1991)
- Columbia, United States (1991)
- Zhengzhou, China (1994)
- Makati, Philippines (1996)
- Suwon, South Korea (1999)
- Chacao (Caracas), Venezuela (1999)
- São Paulo, Brazil (2000)
- Korçë, Albania (2001)
- Province of Parma, Italy (2005)
- Rockford, United States (2005)
- East Lansing, United States (2005)
- Rotherham, England, United Kingdom (2006)
- Viterbo, Italy (2009)
- Namur, Belgium (2010)
- Ningbo, China (2014)
- Ungheni, Moldova (2016)
- Karaganda, Kazakhstan (2017)
- Braga, Portugal (2018)
- Eskişehir, Turkey (2020)

== Footnotes ==
a. The engraving, dating back to 1617, was executed by Georg Houfnagel after the painting of Egidius van der Rye (the original was done in the workshop of Braun and Hagenberg).

b. After the declaration of the union between the 1918–1920 period an exodus of Hungarian inhabitants occurred. Also, the city grew and many people moved in from the surrounding area and Cluj County as a whole, populated largely by Romanians.

c. In August 1940, as the second Vienna Award transferred the northern half of Transylvania to Hungary, many Hungarians and Romanians chose to leave or were exiled. After some ethnic Hungarians groups considered unreliable or insecure were sacked/expelled from Southern-Transylvania, the Hungarian officials also regularly expelled some Romanian groups from Northern-Transylvania.

d. The 1941 Hungarian census is considered unreliable by most historians. In 1941, Cluj had 16,763 Jews. They were forced into ghettos in 1944 by the Hungarian authorities and deported to Auschwitz in May–June 1944.

e. In the 1960s a determined policy of industrialisation was initiated. Many people from the surrounding rural areas (largely Romanian) moved into the city, giving Cluj a Romanian majority.

f. Data refer to those for whom ethnicity is available, and do not include the 23,165 individuals (7.1% of the city's population) for whom such data are unavailable.

== See also ==
- List of people from Cluj-Napoca
