= Regele Ferdinand Avenue, Cluj-Napoca =

Street in Cluj-Napoca, Romania

Coordinates: 46.771203°N 23.589948°E

Regele Ferdinand Avenue
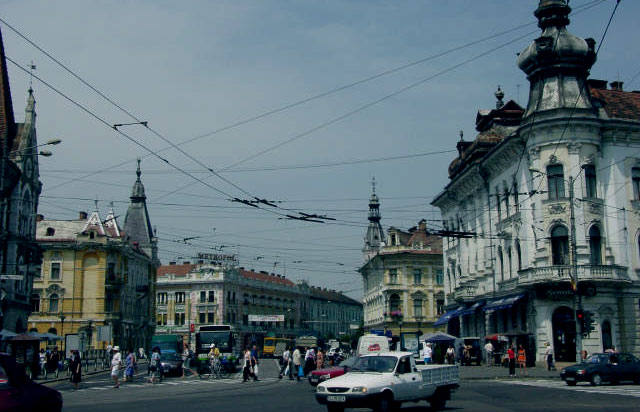
- The Northern end
- Native name: Regele Ferdinand (Romanian)
- Former name(s): Strada Podului, Strada Gheorghe Doja
- Namesake: King Ferdinand
- From: Strada Horea/Hotel Astoria
- To: Bulevardul 1 Decembrie 1989

Regele Ferdinand Avenue (named after King Ferdinand I; previously called Strada Podului), is a street in central Cluj-Napoca, Romania, featuring a wide range of structures built between 18th and 19th centuries. It is a primary commercial street.

A building ensemble that fastens the corners of the oldest bridge over the Someşul Mic River was built at the northern end of the avenue during the last decade of the 19th century: the Berde, Babos, Elian, Urania, and Szeky palaces consist of a mix of Baroque, Renaissance and Gothic styles, following the Art Nouveau/Secession and Revival specifics.

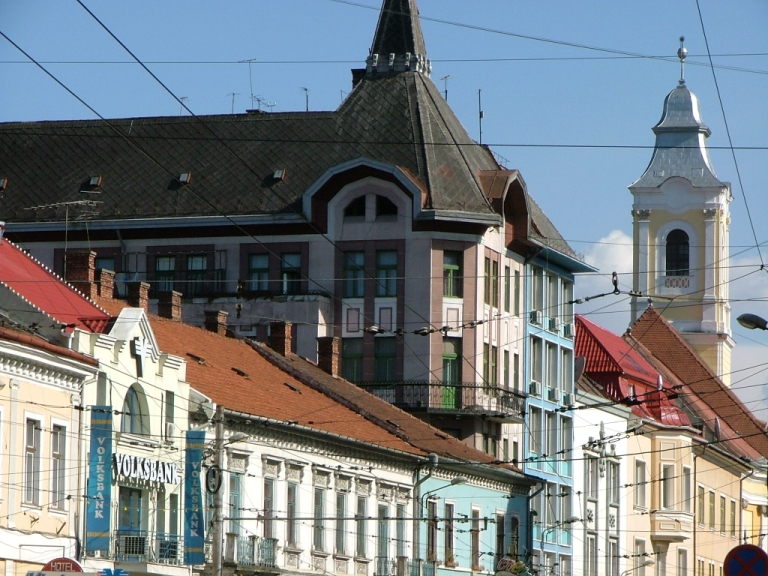
Buildings on Regele Ferdinand Avenue
