= Great Market Hall =

Market hall in Budapest, Hungary

Coordinates: 47°29′12″N 19°03′32″E

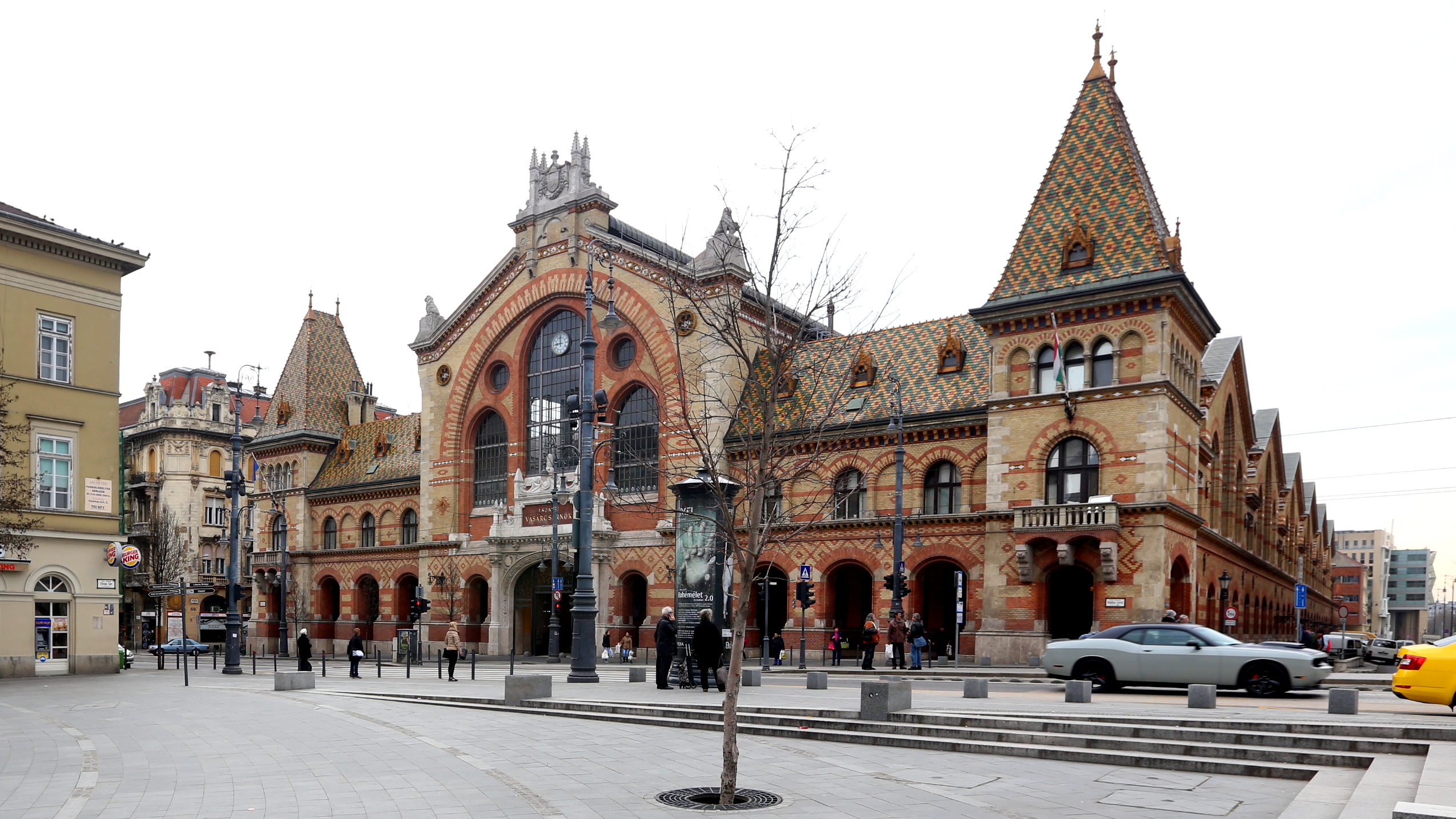
Great Market Hall, 2016

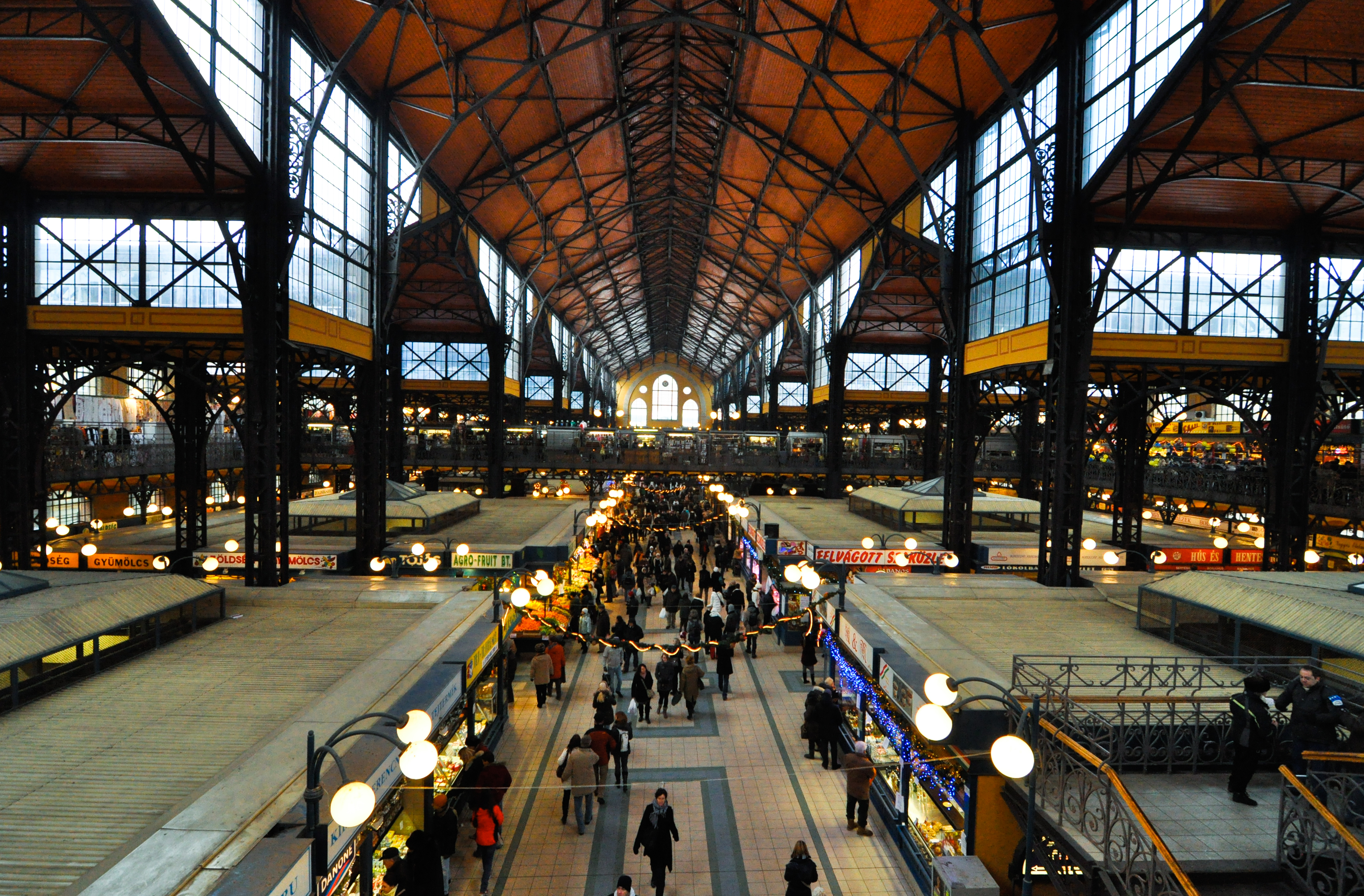
Overview of the Great Market Hall inside

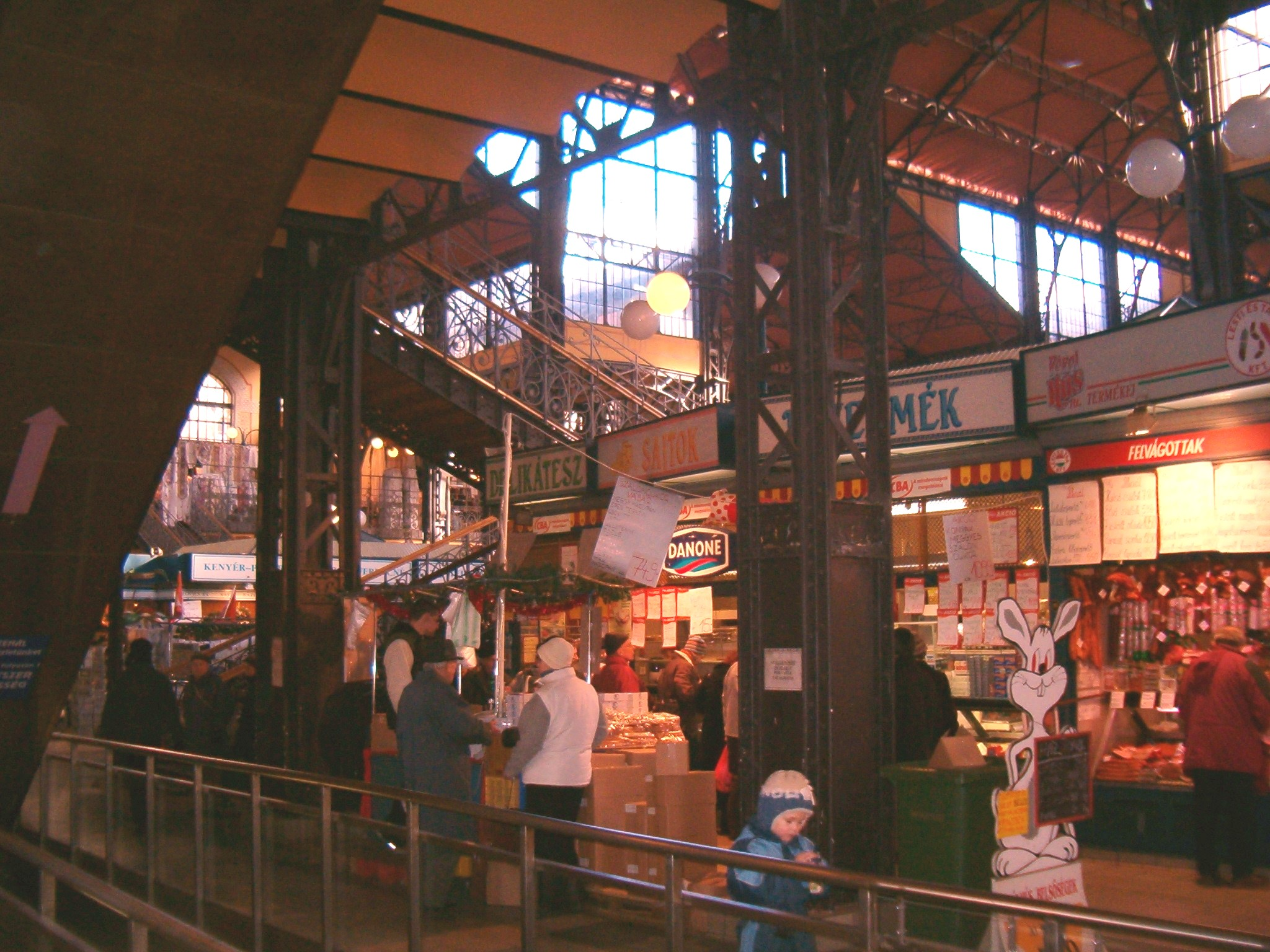
Inside the Great Market

The Great Market Hall or Central Market Hall, Market Hall I (Hungarian: Nagyvásárcsarnok [ˈnɒɟvaːʃaːt͡ʃɒrnok]) is the largest and oldest indoor market in Budapest, Hungary. The idea of building such a large market hall arose from the first mayor of Budapest, Károly Kamermayer, and it was his largest investment. He retired in 1896 and participated in the opening ceremony on February 15, 1897.

It is located at the end of the famous pedestrian shopping street Váci utca and on the Pest side of the Liberty bridge at Fővám square.

== History ==
It had already been suggested in the 1860s that the food supply to the capital city should be improved by the construction of market halls. One of the main objectives set by preliminary plans was that only food which had been inspected should be sold. Not only had the establishment of the retail network to be organised, but they also wished to regulate the sale of wholesale goods.

Because of continuous deterioration in food supply conditions, a plan encompassing the whole capital was worked out in 1879. General assembly resolution No. 852 of 30 December provided for the establishment of a Food Committee.

The committee formed to prepare for the establishment of market halls drew up a proposal in 1883. They considered the most favourable position for the Central Market Hall to be Fővám Square, on the site of the Salt depot.

On 28 October 1885, the subject of the market hall once again arose in the capital. The Committee for Economics and Food discussed and accepted the initiative of committee member Lajos Nyíri. They were of the decided opinion that the Central Market Hall must be built in the 9 th district, on the plot of land lying between the Vámház Blvd, and Pipa, Csillag and Sóház (meaning: salt depot) Streets. At that time, the plot was the property of the state treasury. According to an initial agreement, "the royal government relinquishes the plot for the sake of the capital".

Materialisation of plans for a market hall had been dragging on for several years at that time, and essentially no progress had been made. Conditions further deteriorated due to the disorganised state of food supply for the capital and the rapid increase in the population. In 1890 events connected with the establishment of the market halls increased in pace. To an increasing extent, the public became aware of the necessity for a market hall.

After a general assembly resolution in 1891 which appeared to be final, the Prime Minister Kálmán Tisza, or rather the Justice Minister Teofil Fabiny, relinquished the site to the capital in exchange for a site on Alkotmány Street.

The building was designed and built by Samu Pecz in 1897. The market offers a large variety of stalls on three floors. The entrance gate has a neogothic touch. A distinctive architectural feature is the roof which was restored to have colorful Zsolnay tiling from Pécs. The size of the building is 10,000 square meters and is covered by steel structure. During World War II the market was significantly damaged and remained in deteriorating condition. It wasn't until 1991 that a thorough renovation was undertaken to bring it back to its original splendor. The building re-opened in 1997 to much acclaim and was awarded with FIABCI Prix d’Excellence in 1999. The Central Market Hall continues to be one of the most popular tourist attractions of the city.

Most of the stalls on the ground floor offer produce, meats, pastries, candies, spices, and spirits. Many of them have items that are popular with tourists: paprika spices, Tokaji wine, Túró Rudi, kolbász sausage and salami can be found there. The second mezzanine floor has eateries and tourist souvenirs. The basement contains fish mongers, picked vegetables stalls and a few specialized butcher shops.

The market opens Monday through Saturday at 6am, but closes Monday at 5pm, Tuesday through Friday at 6pm, and at 3pm on Saturday.

== Gallery ==
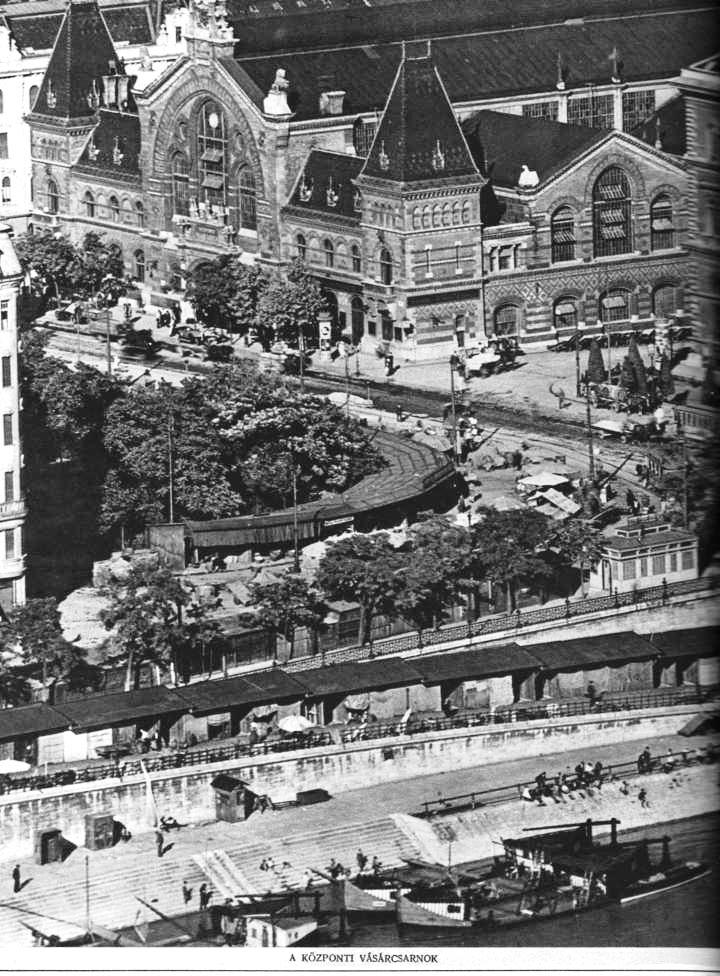

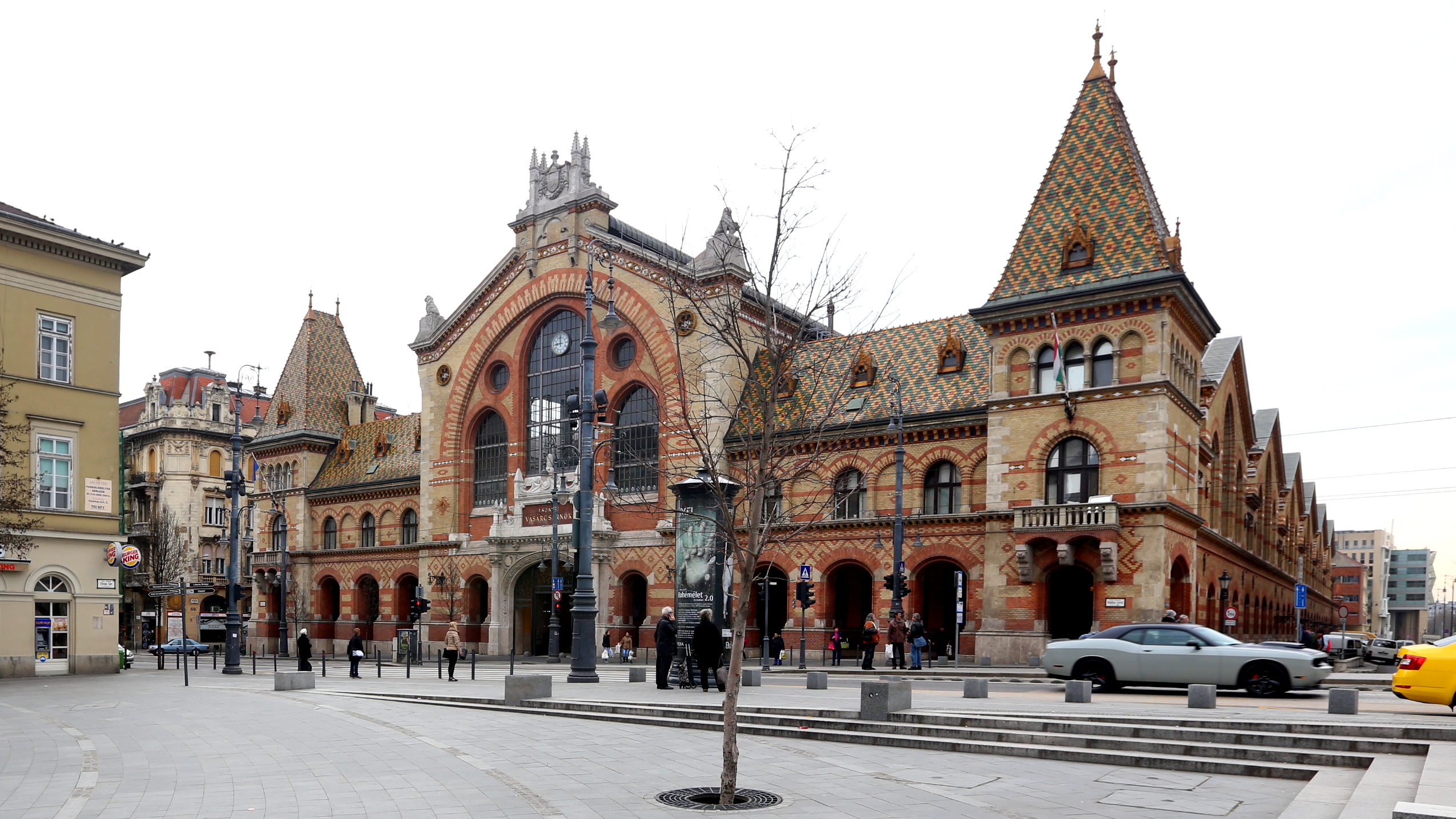

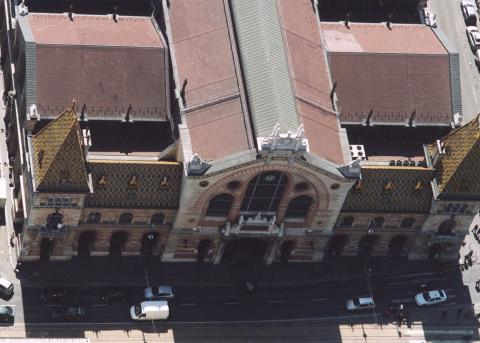

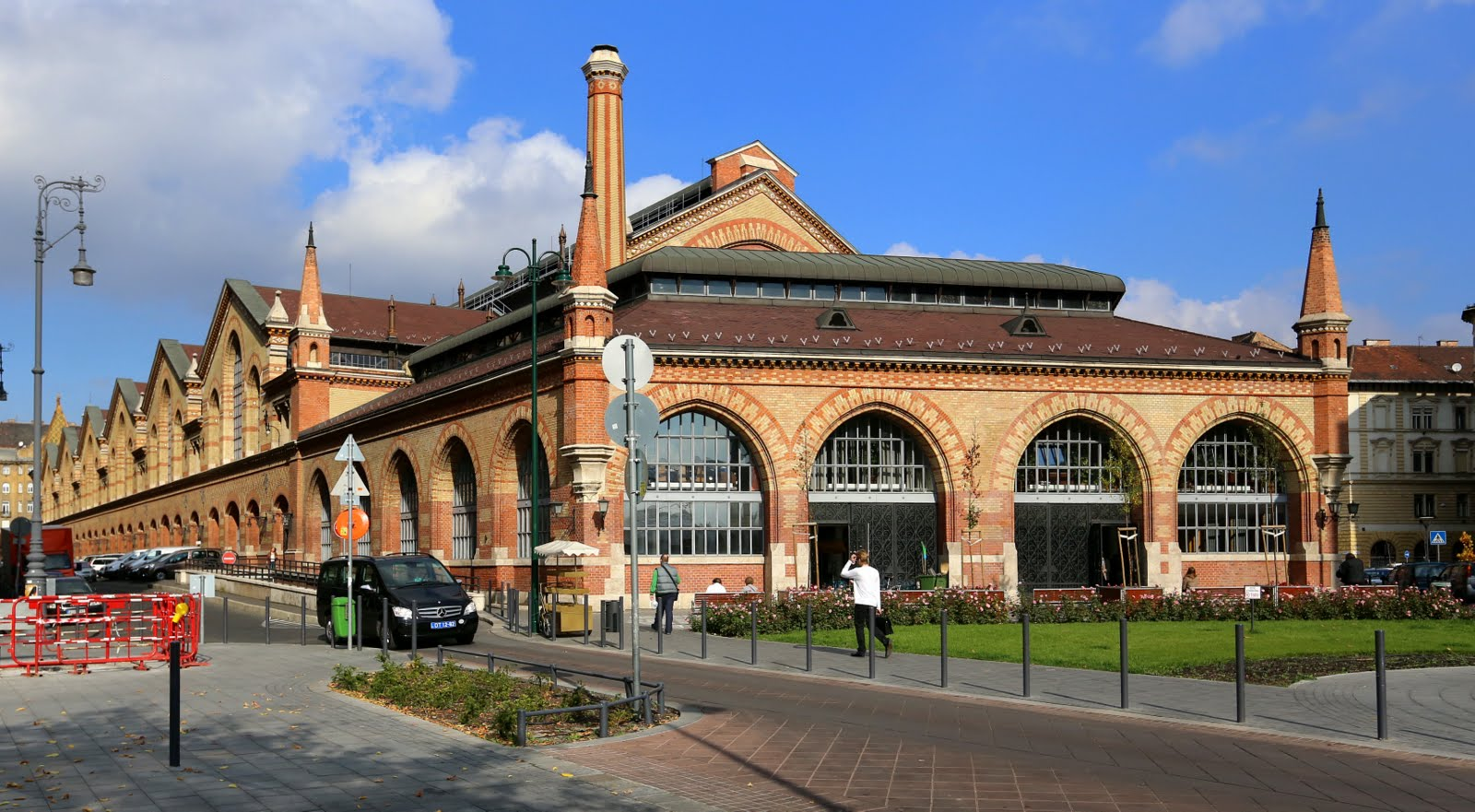

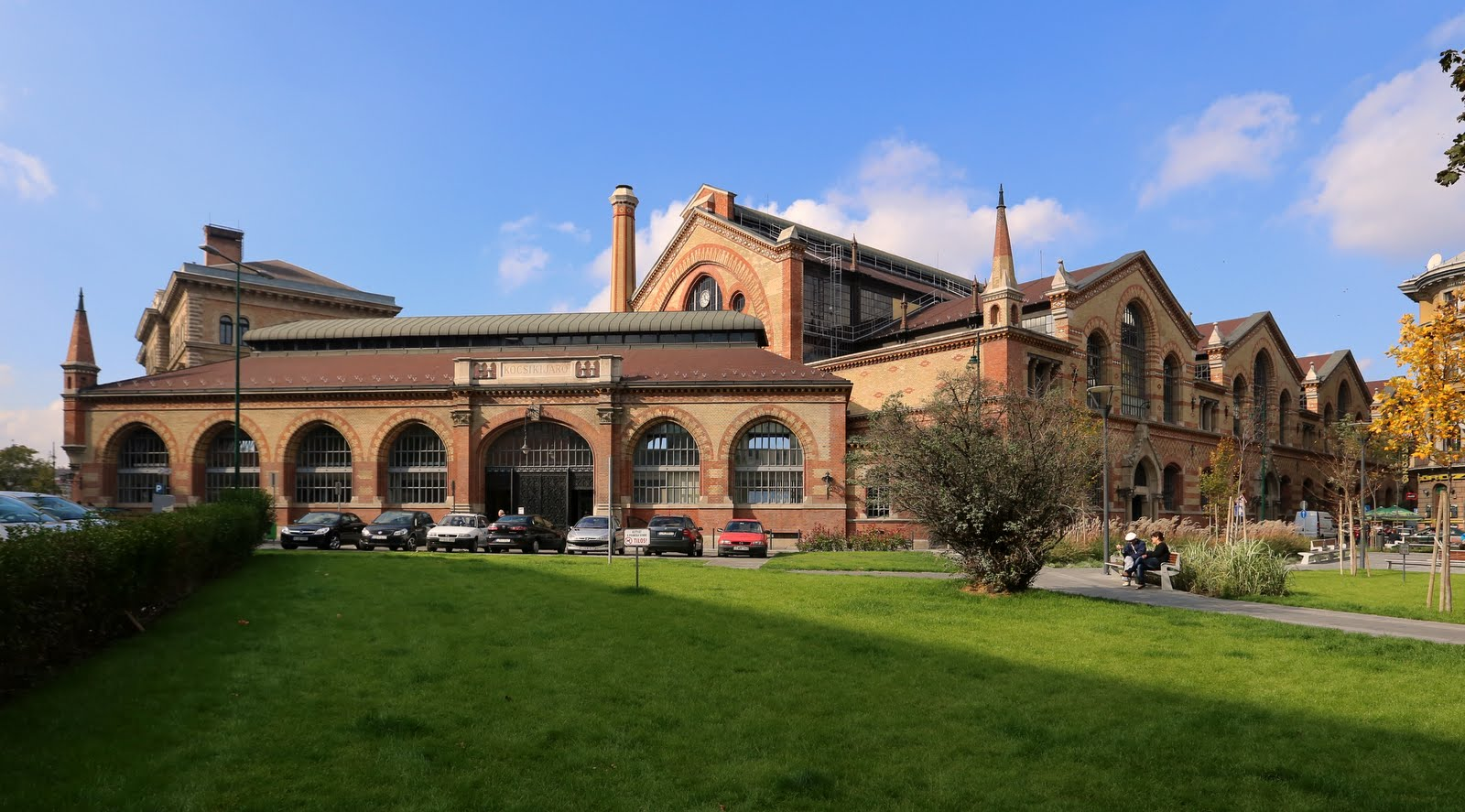

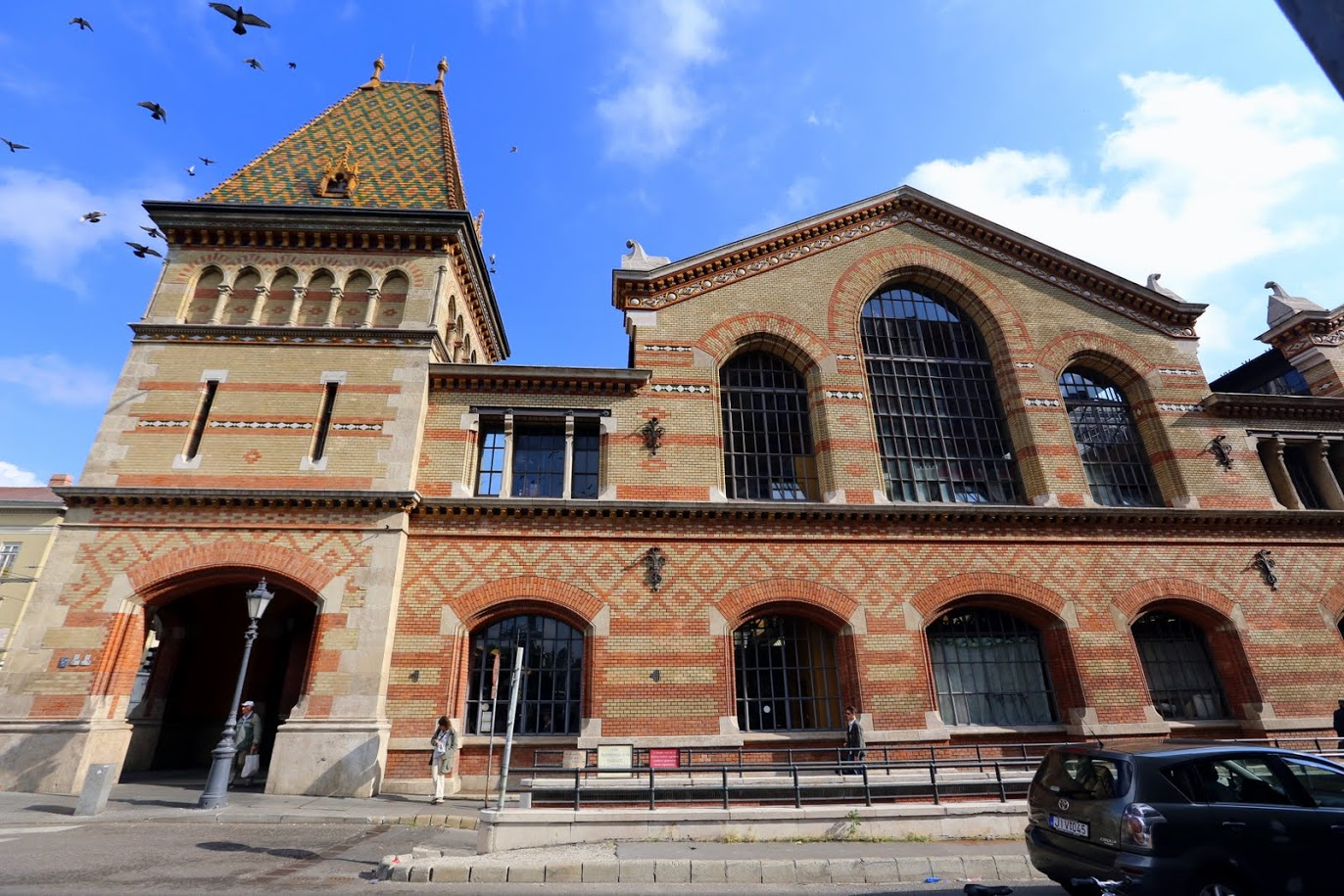

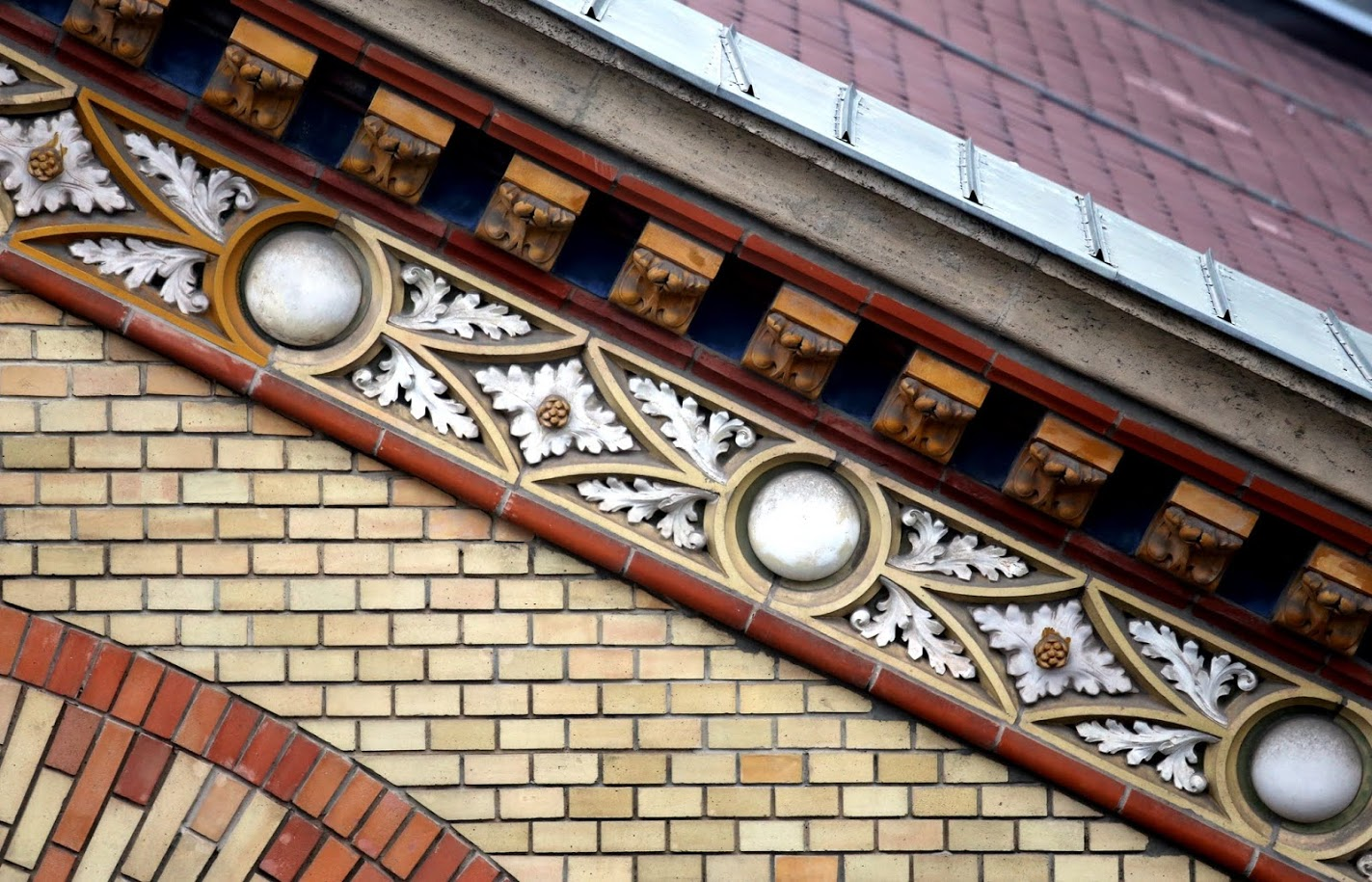

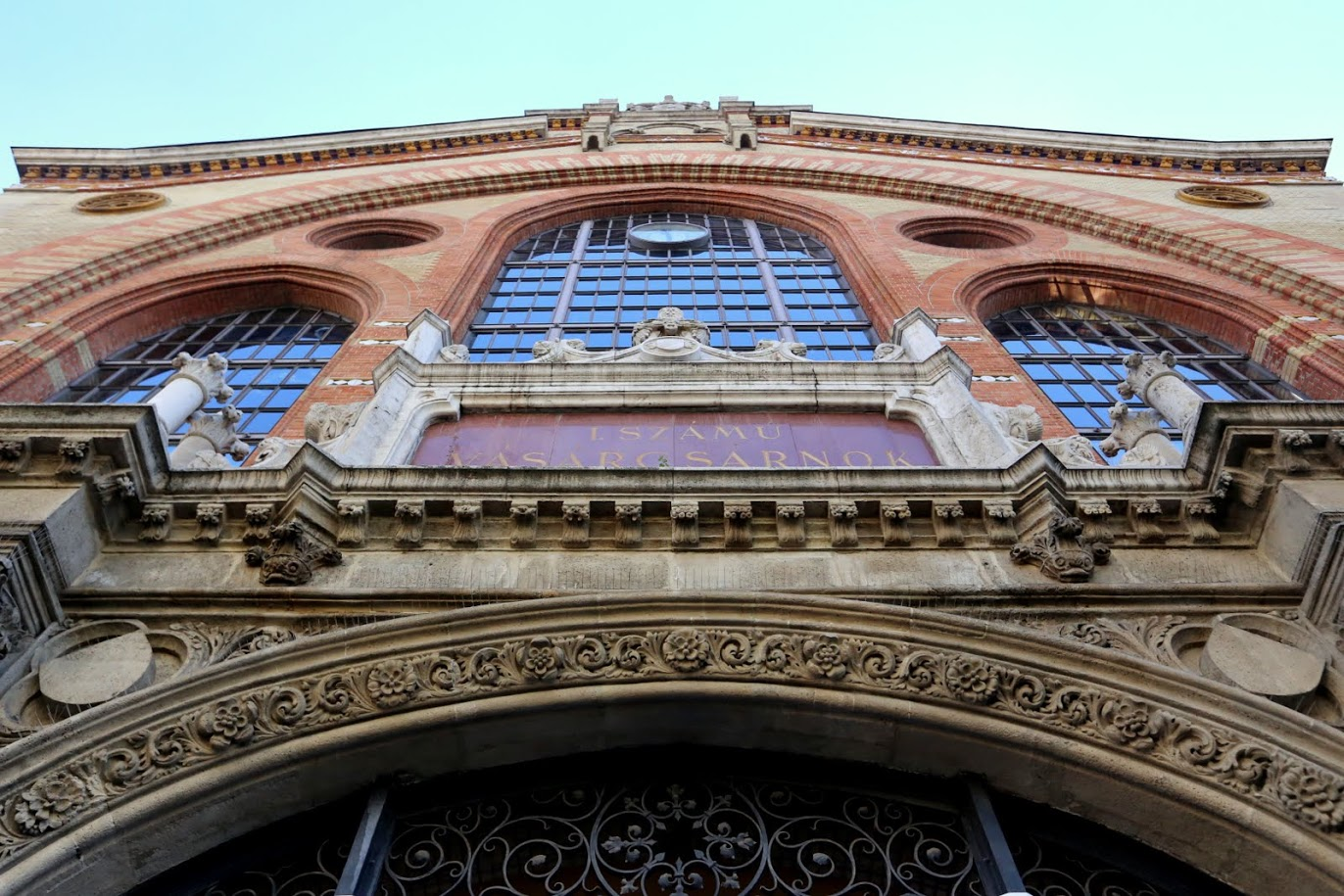

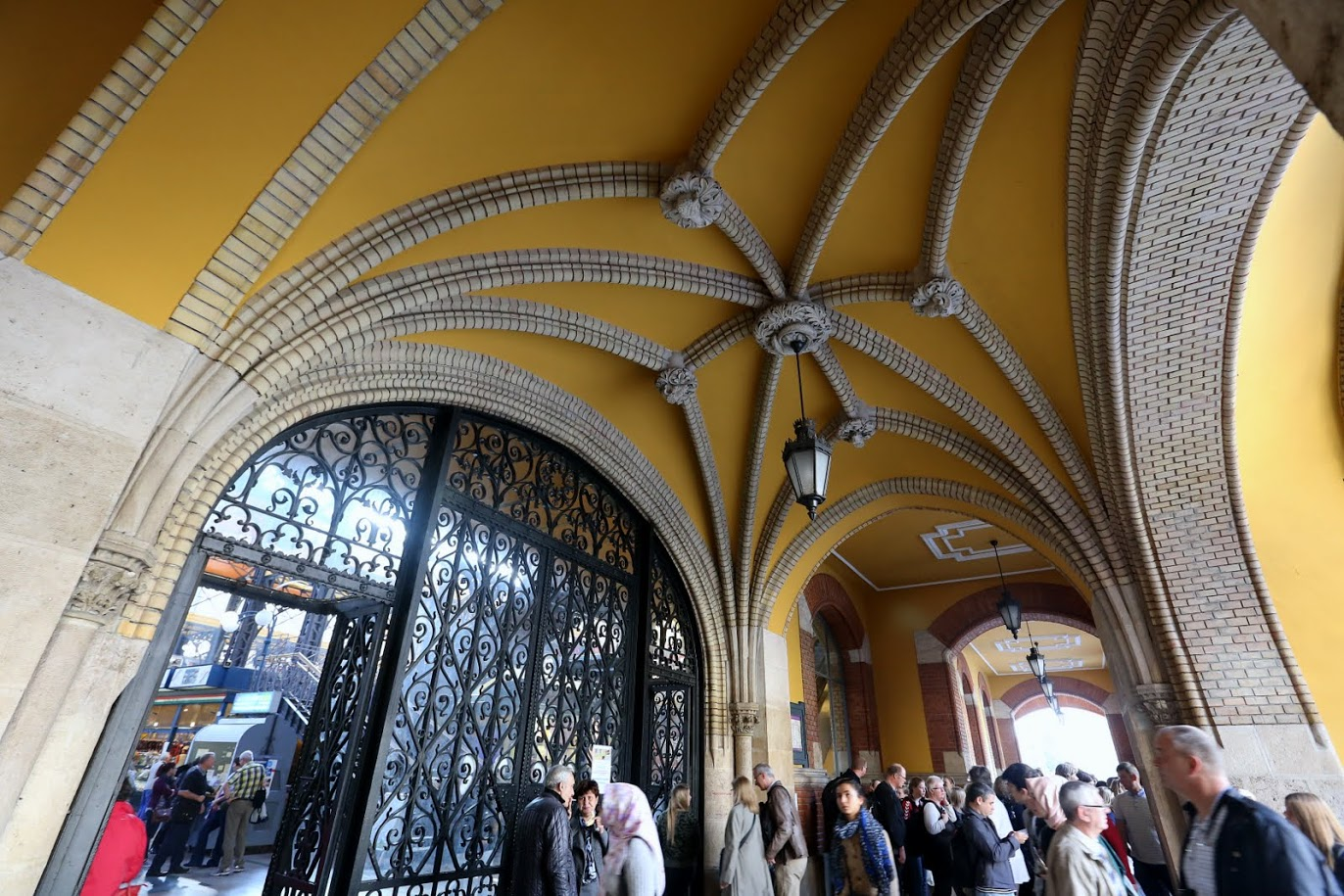

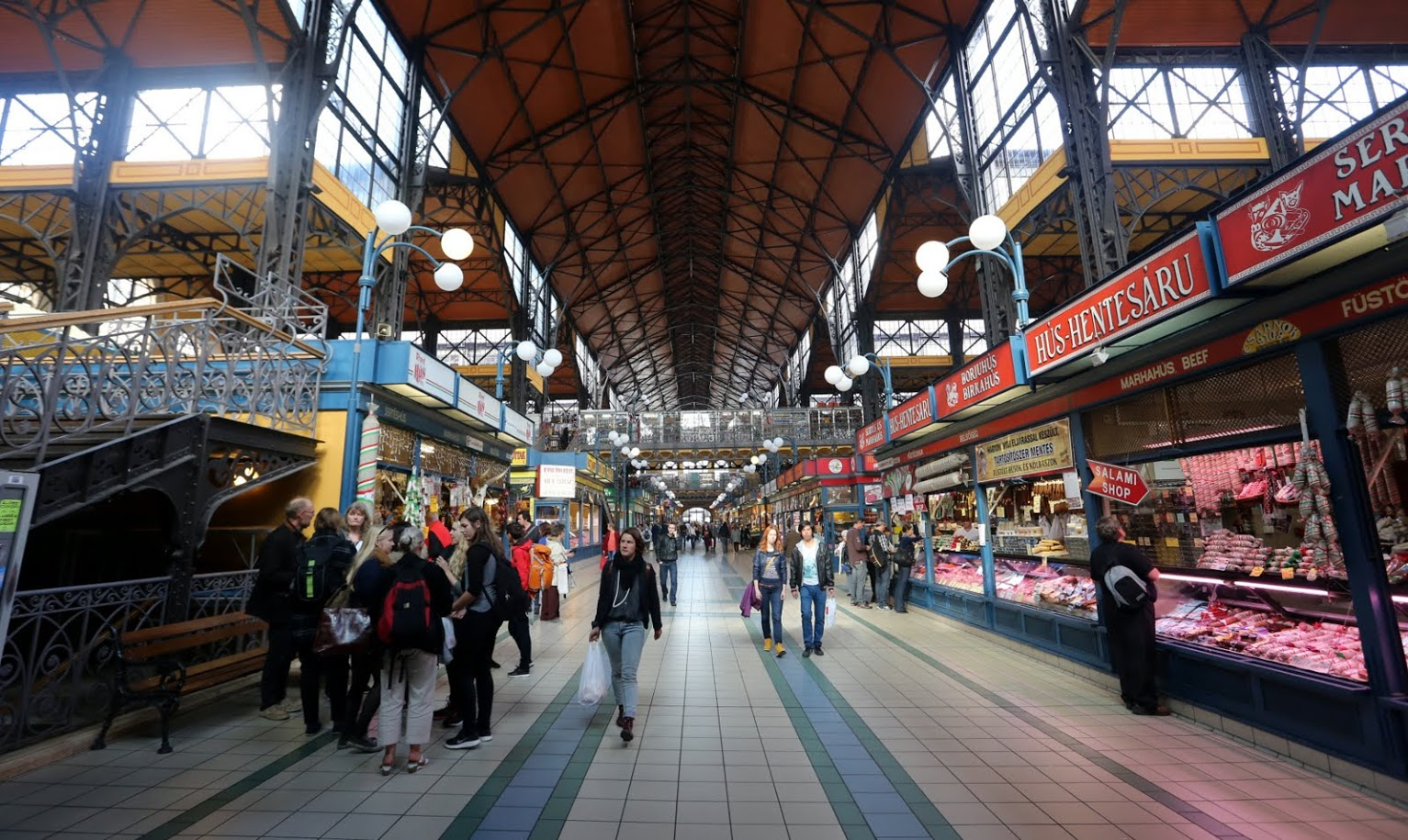

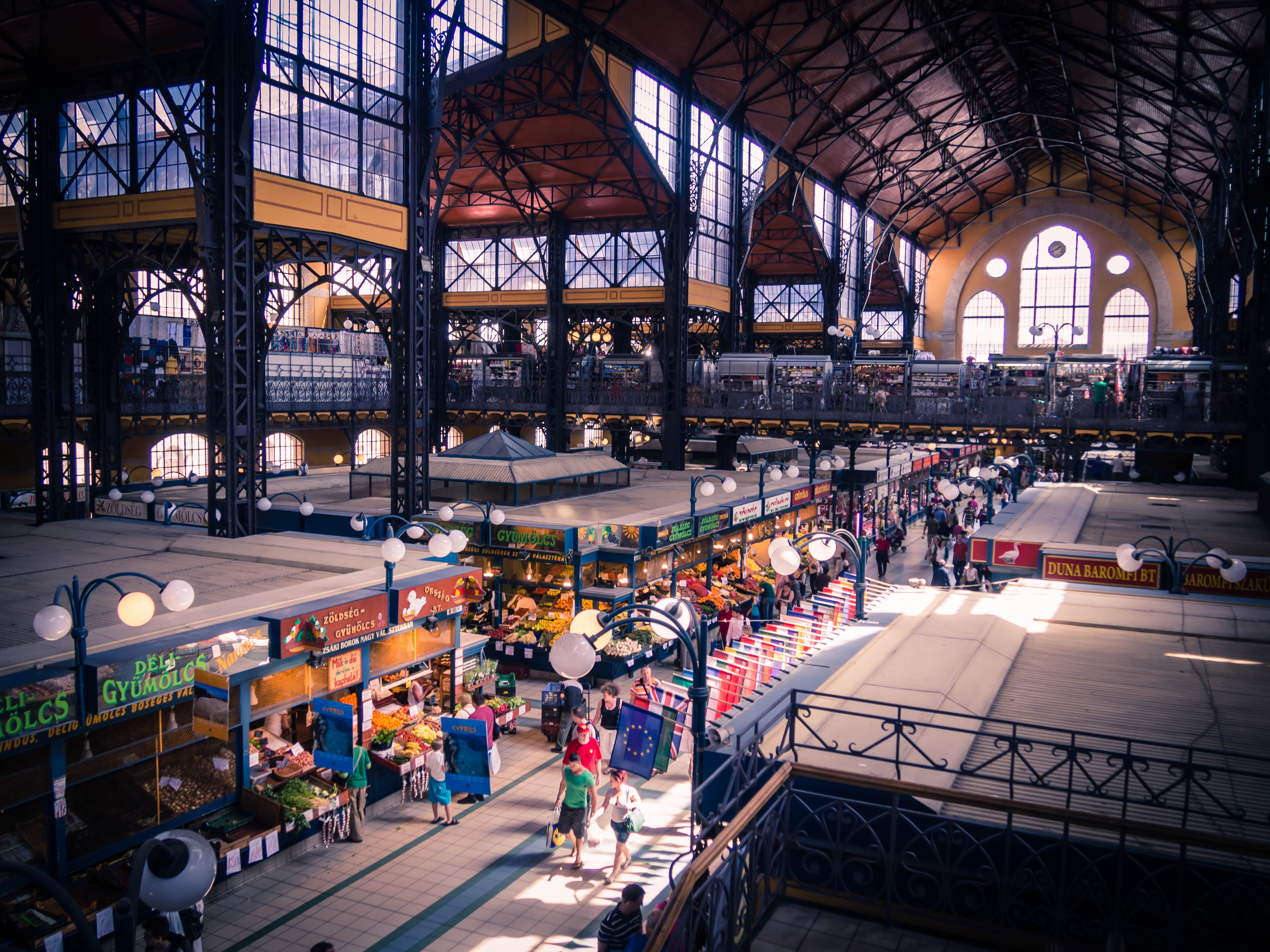

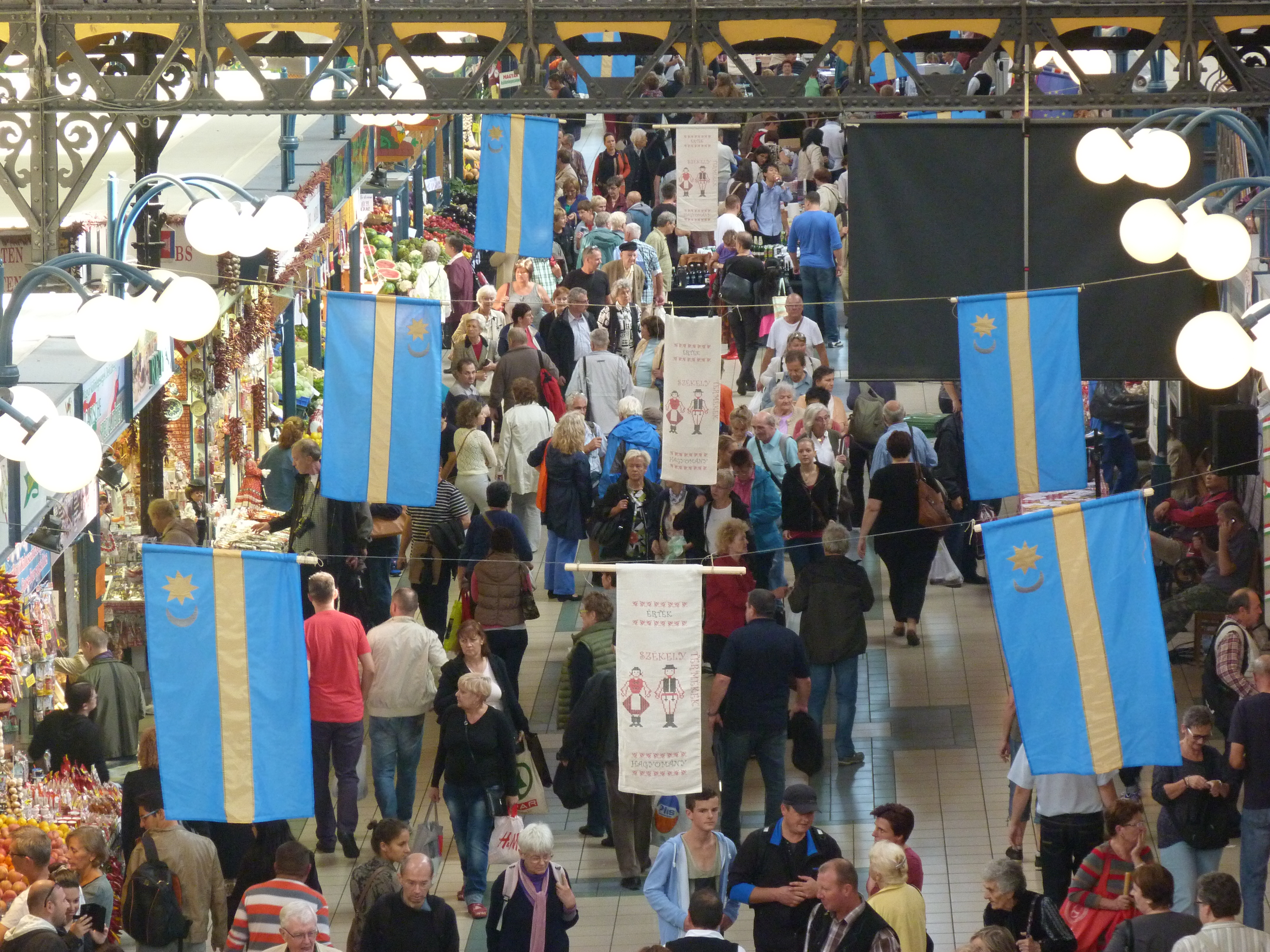

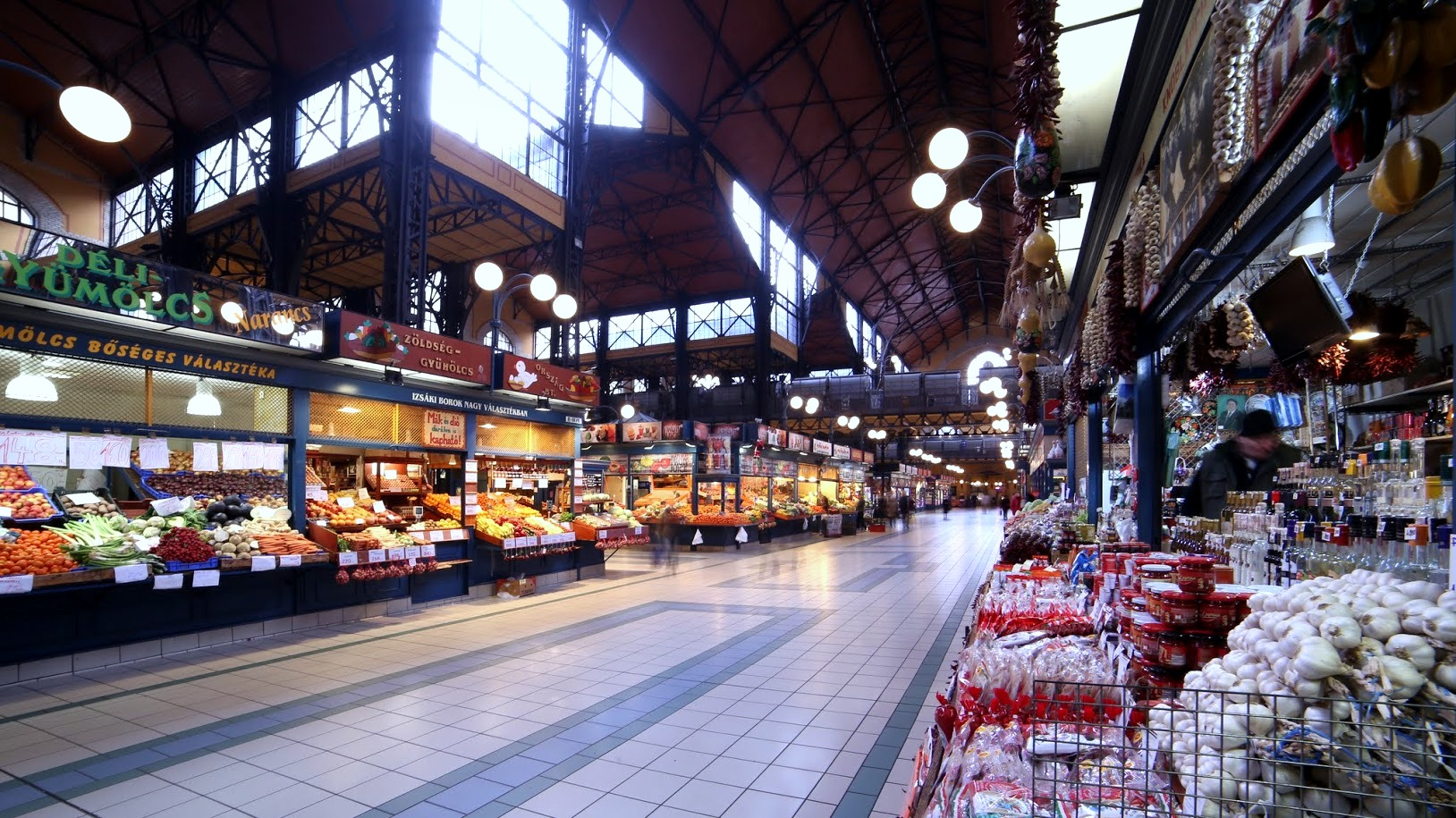

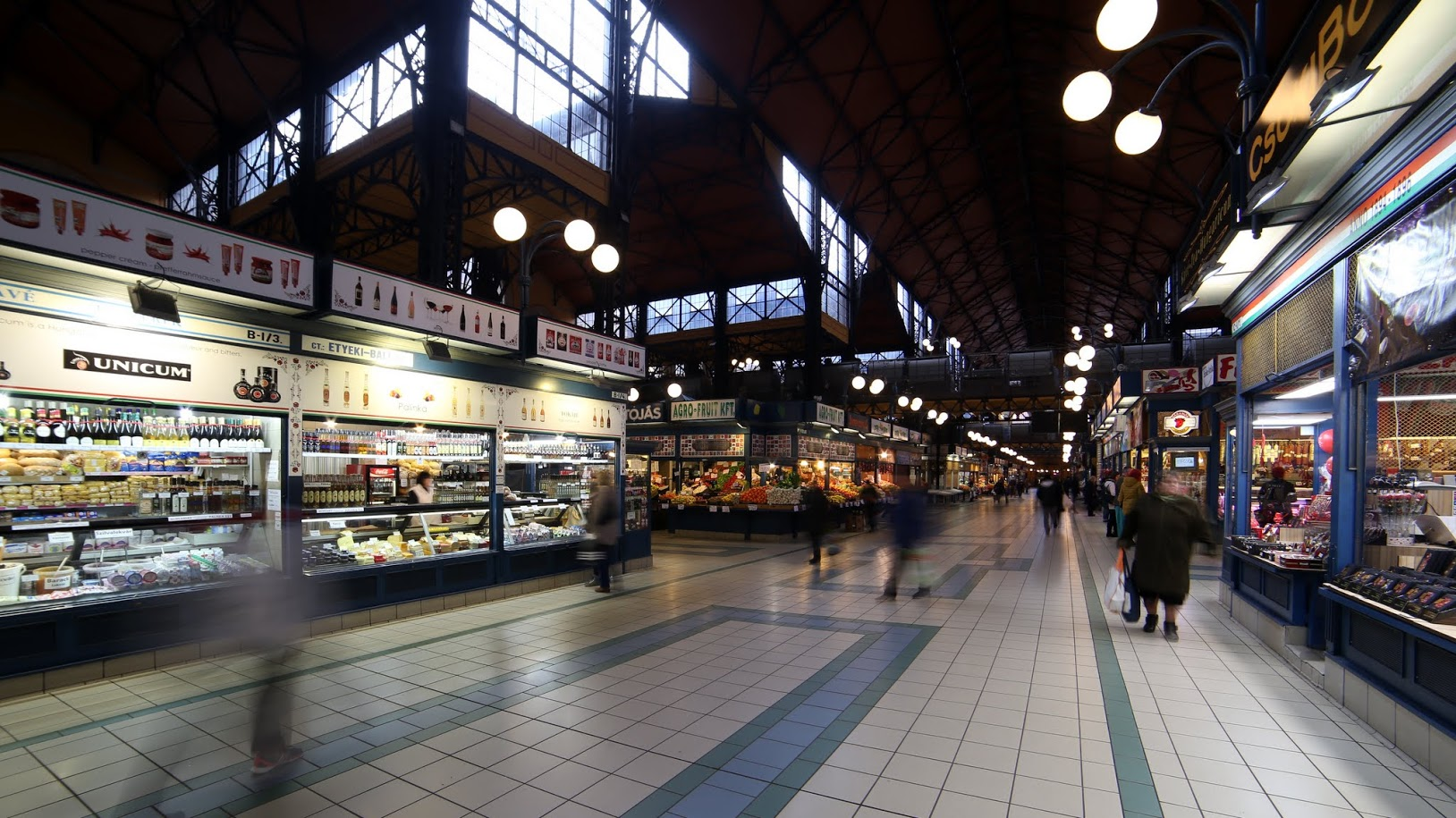

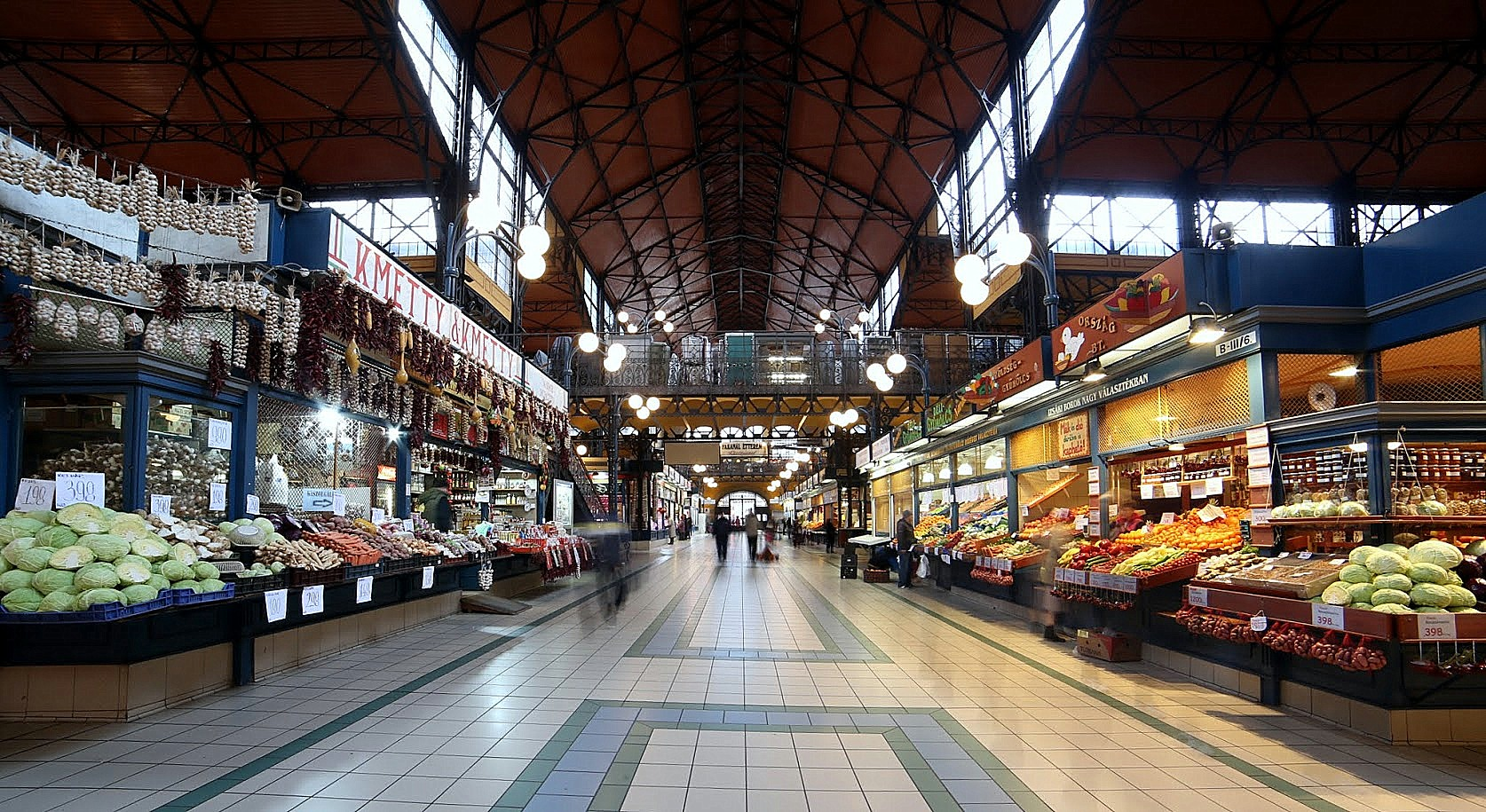

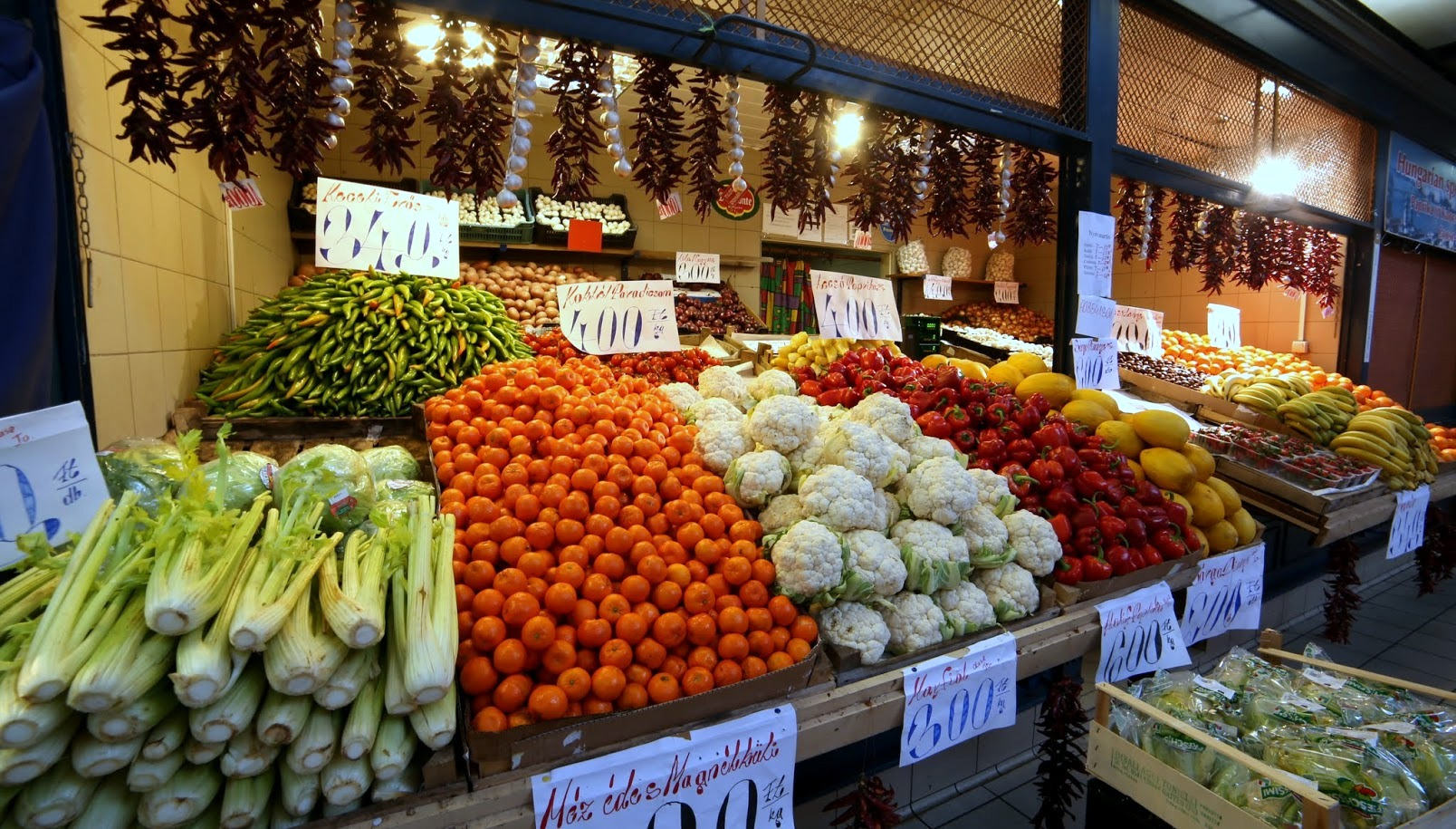

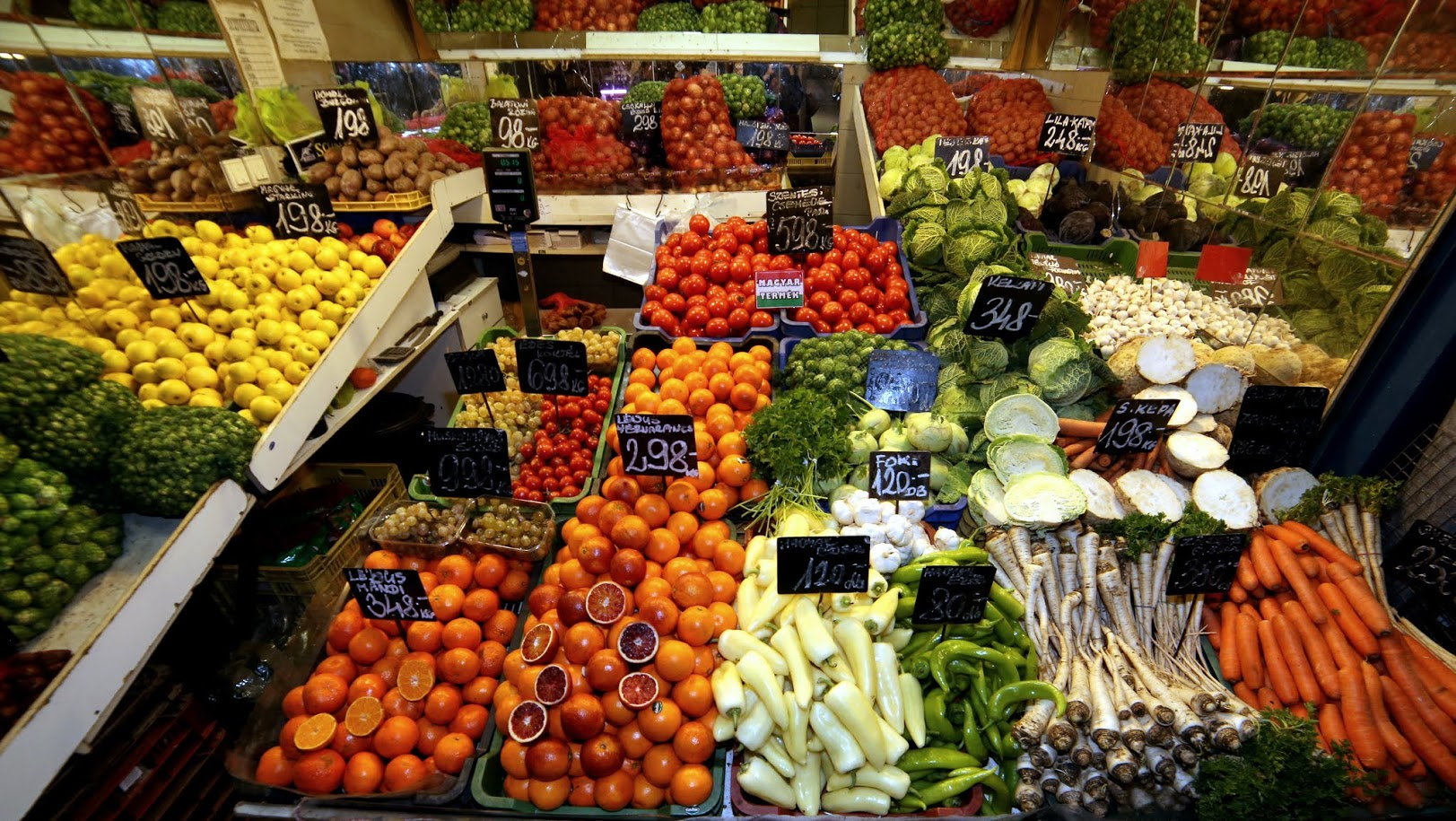

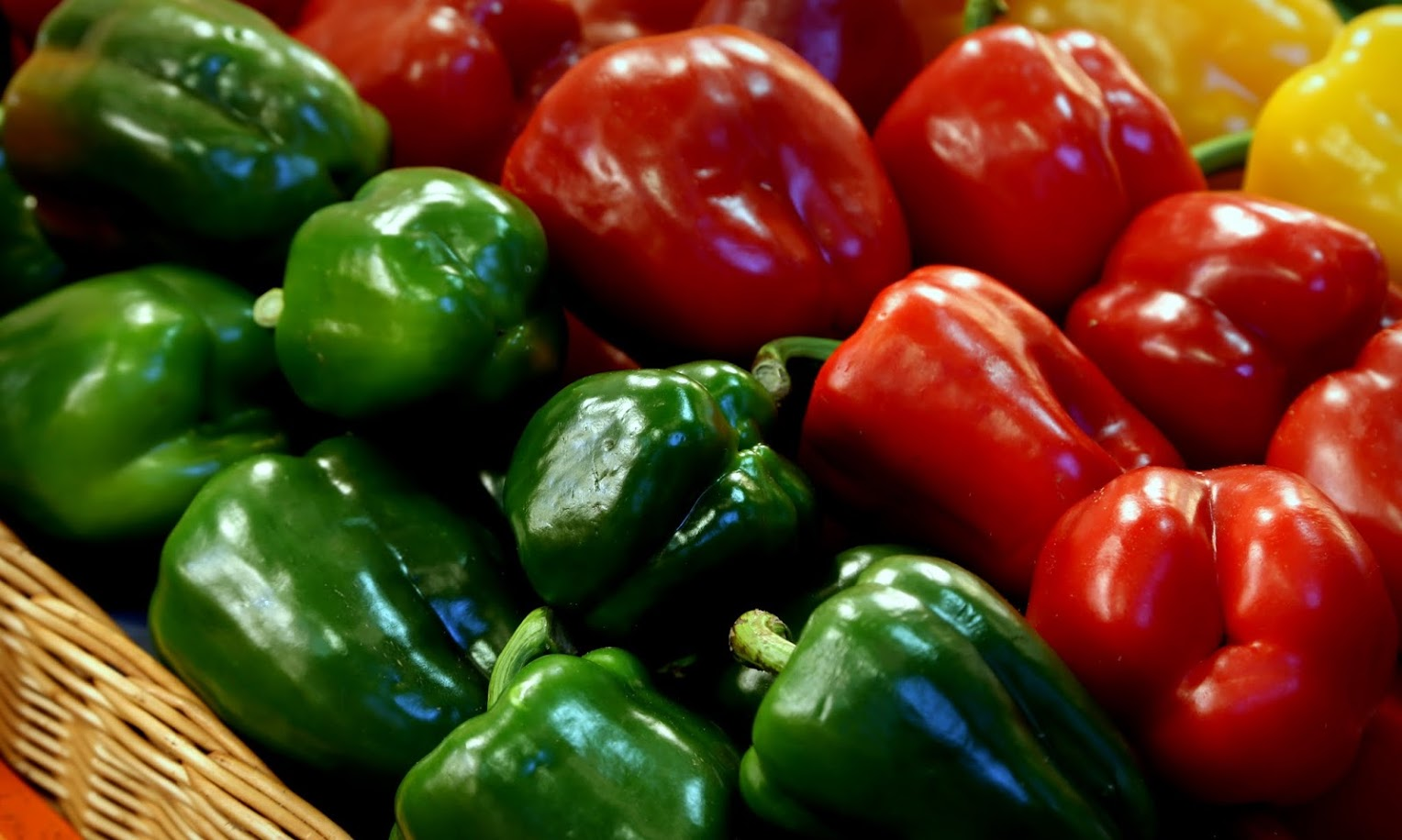

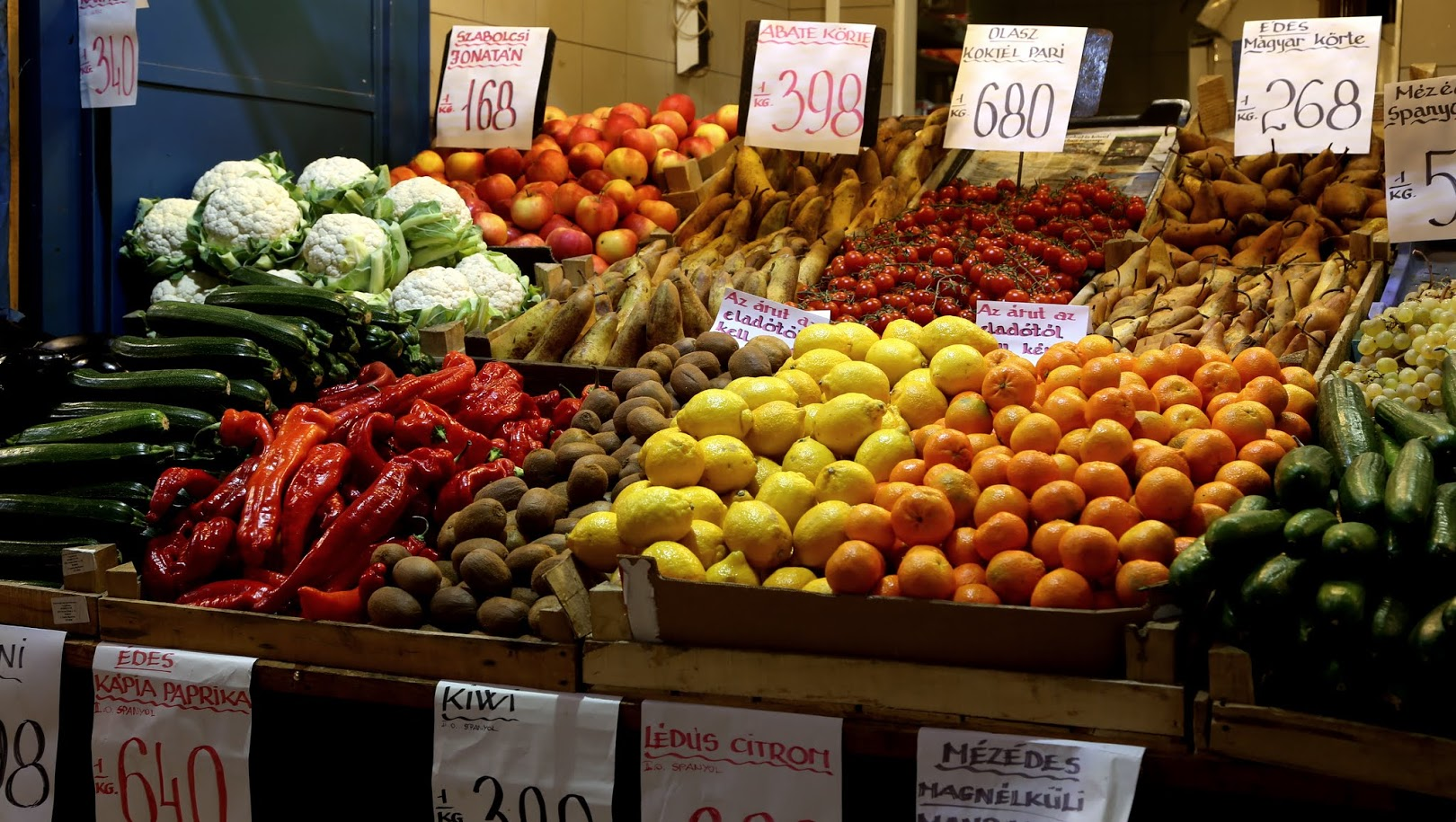

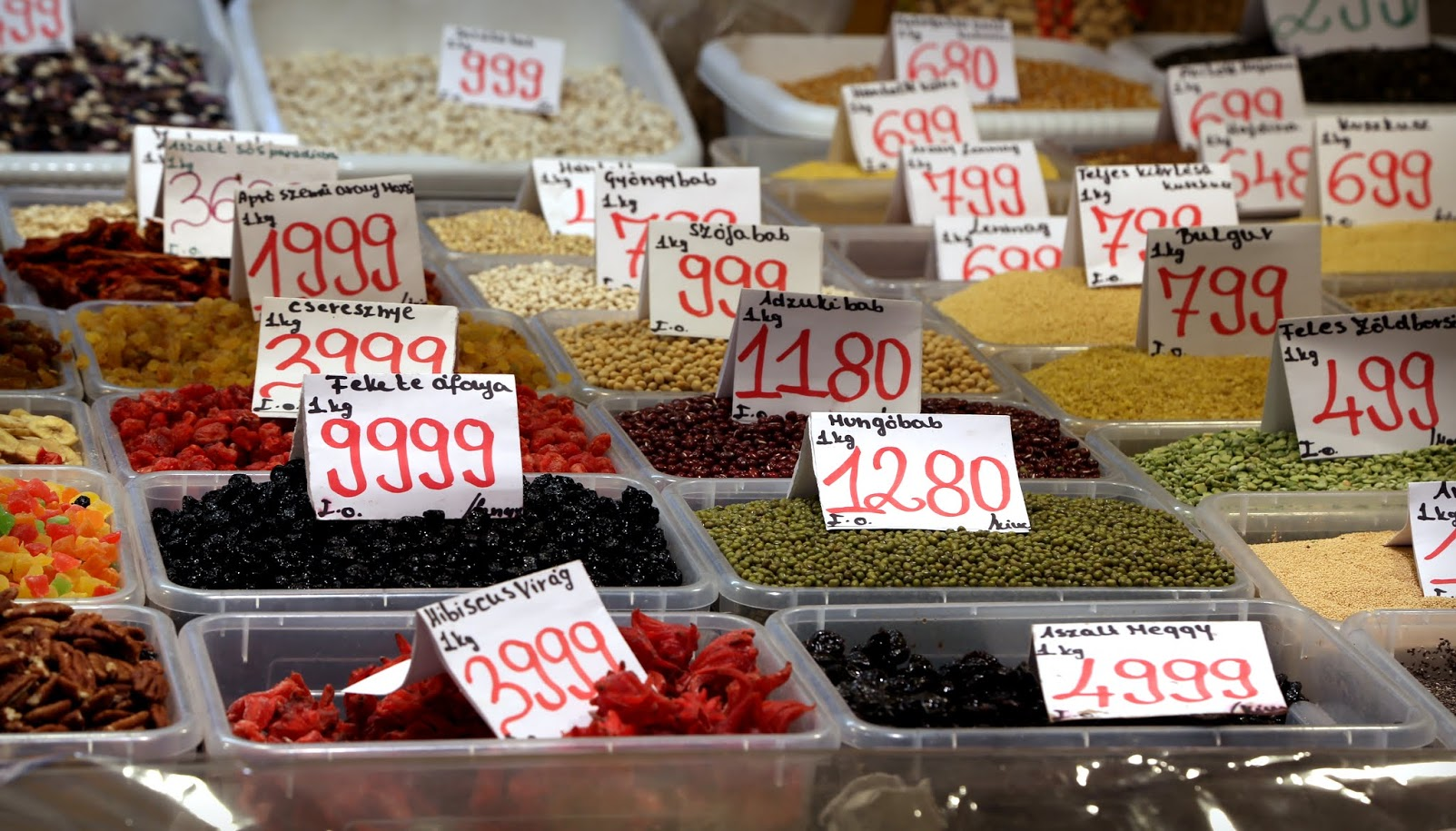

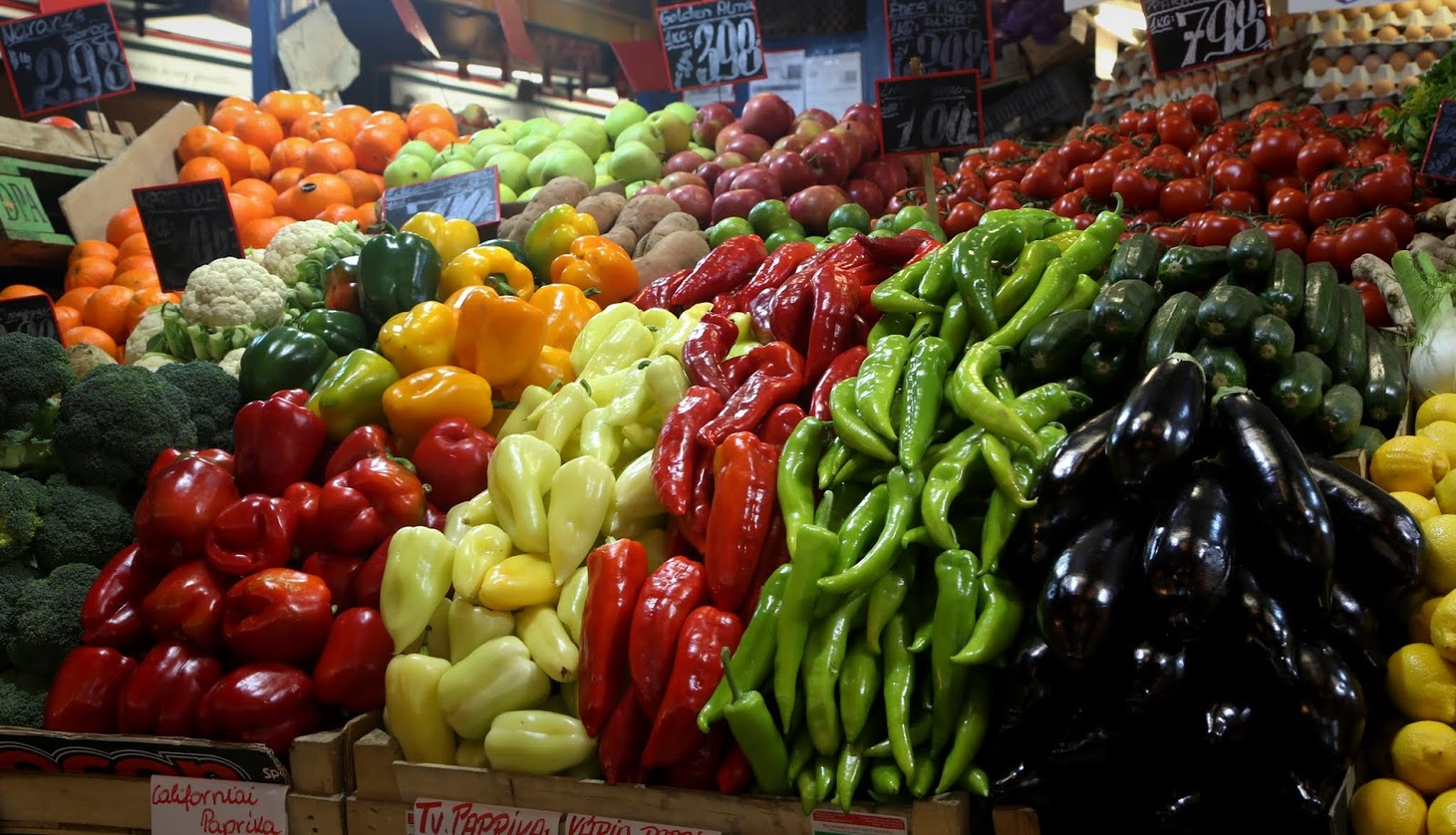

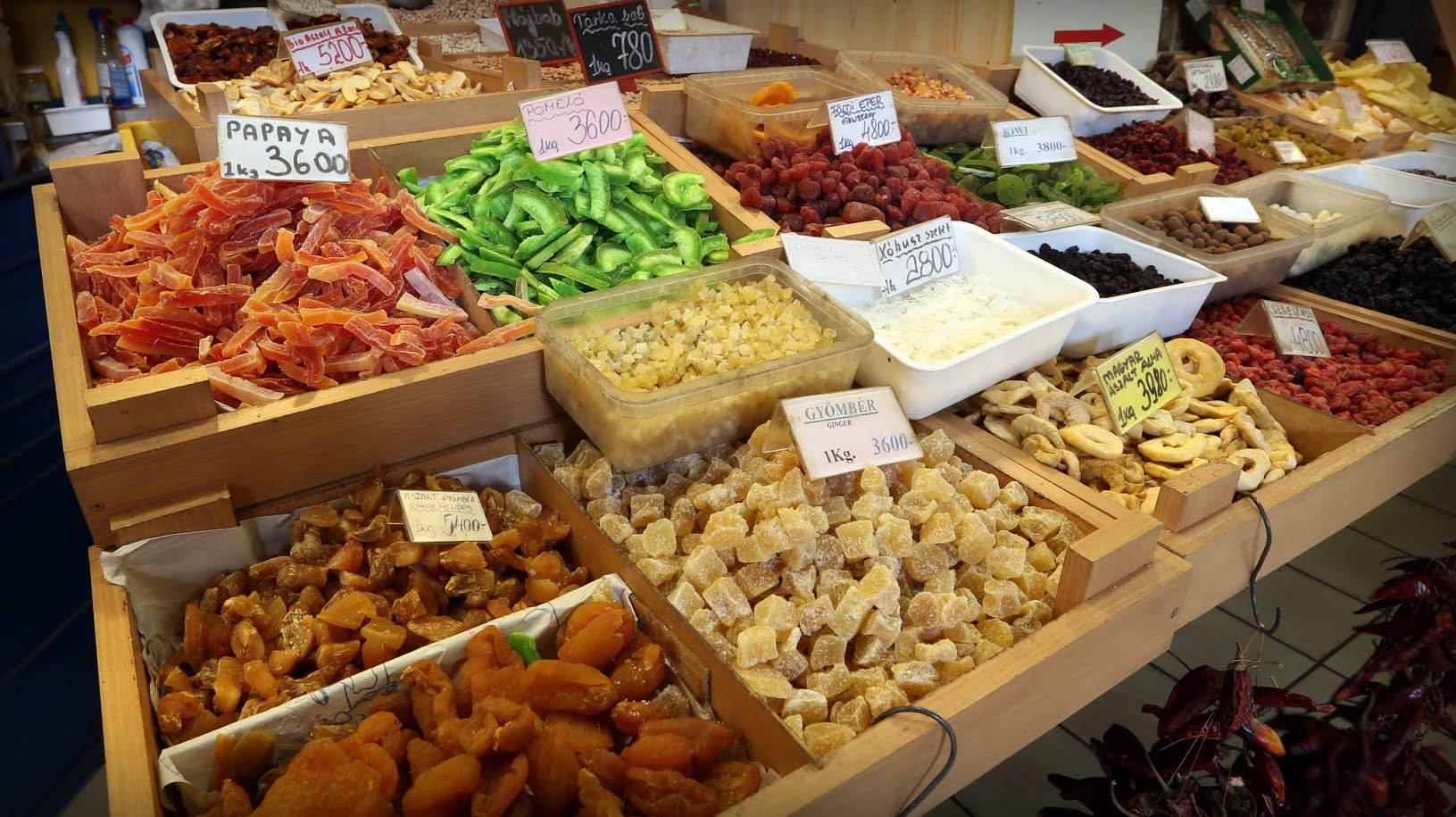

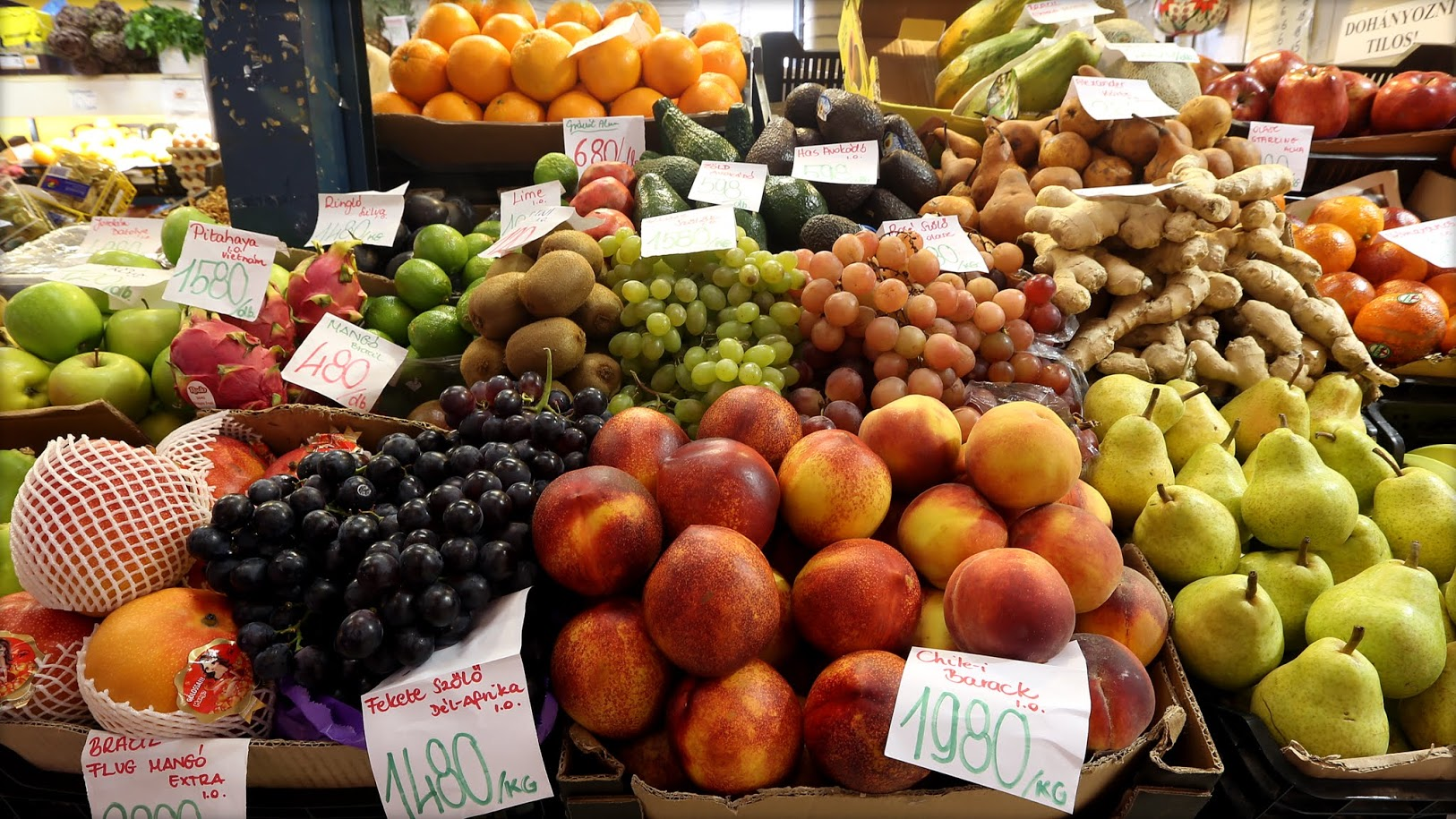

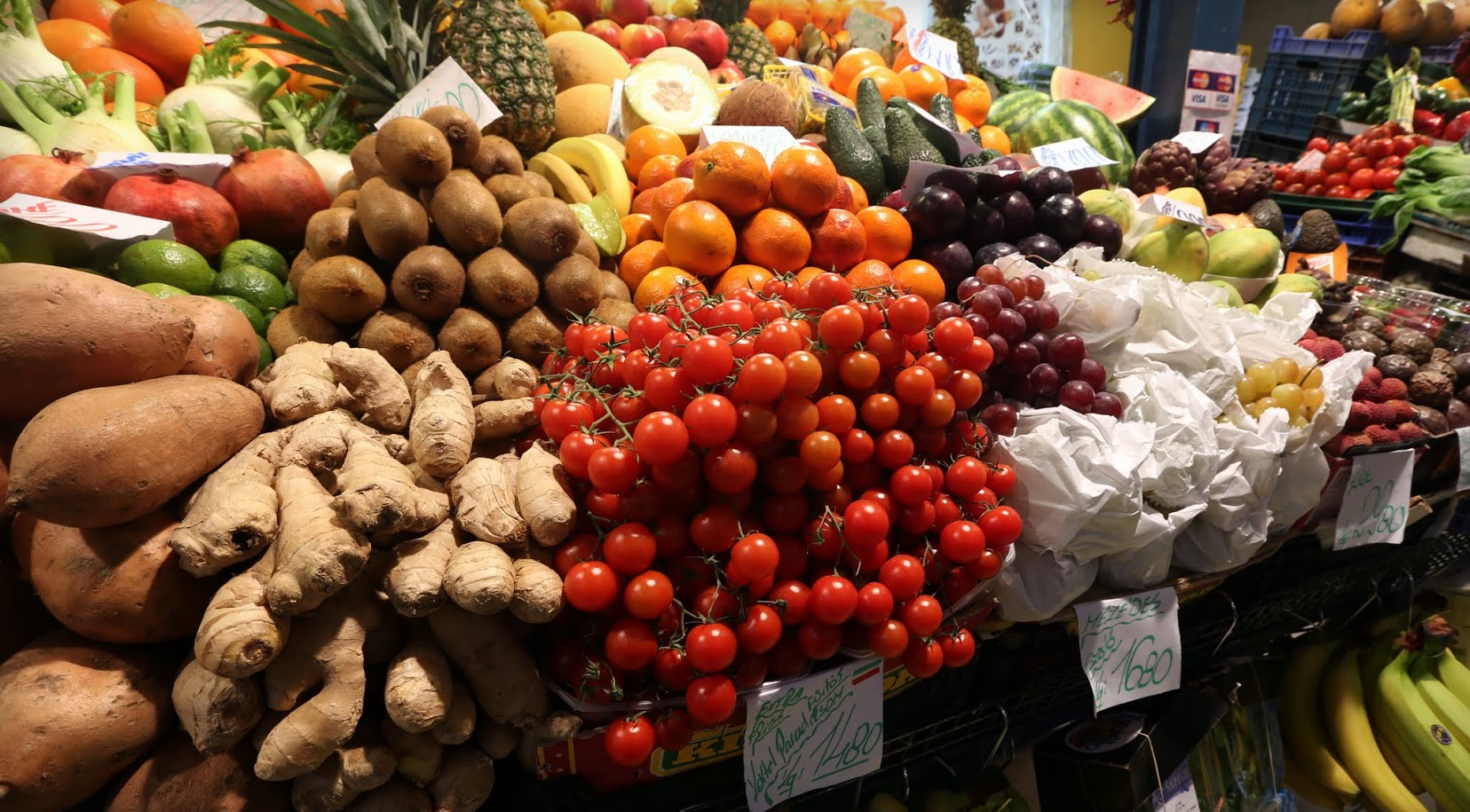

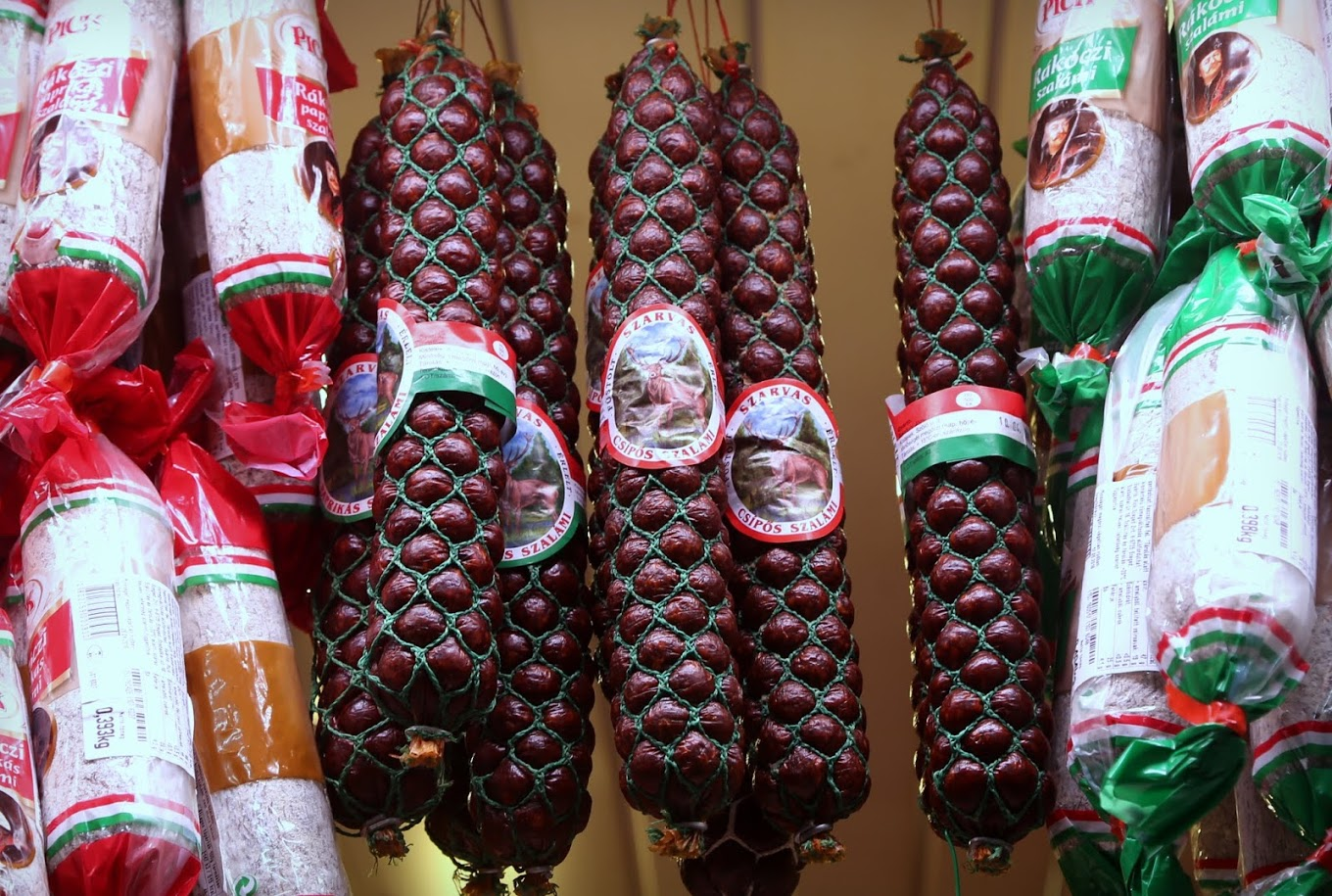

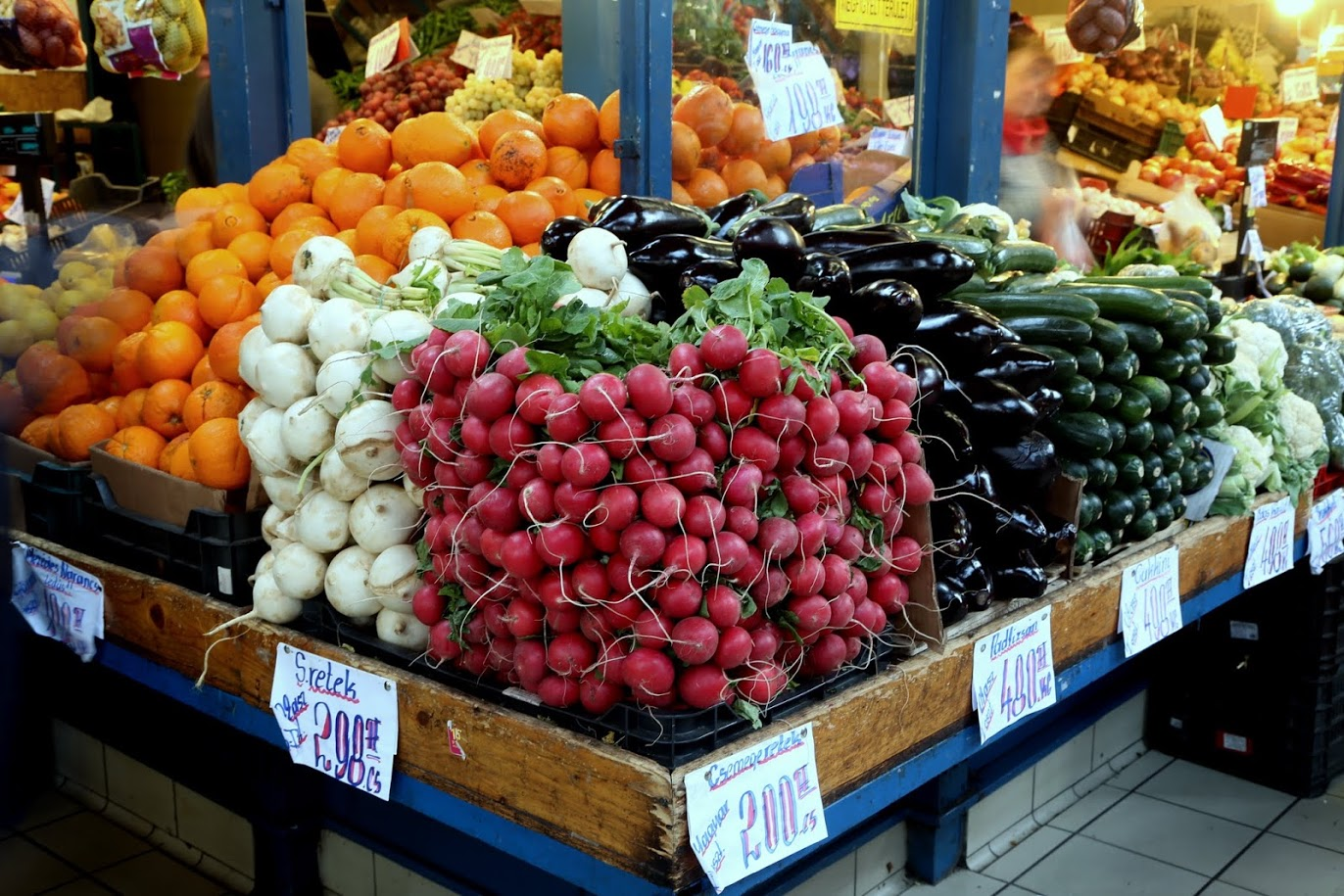

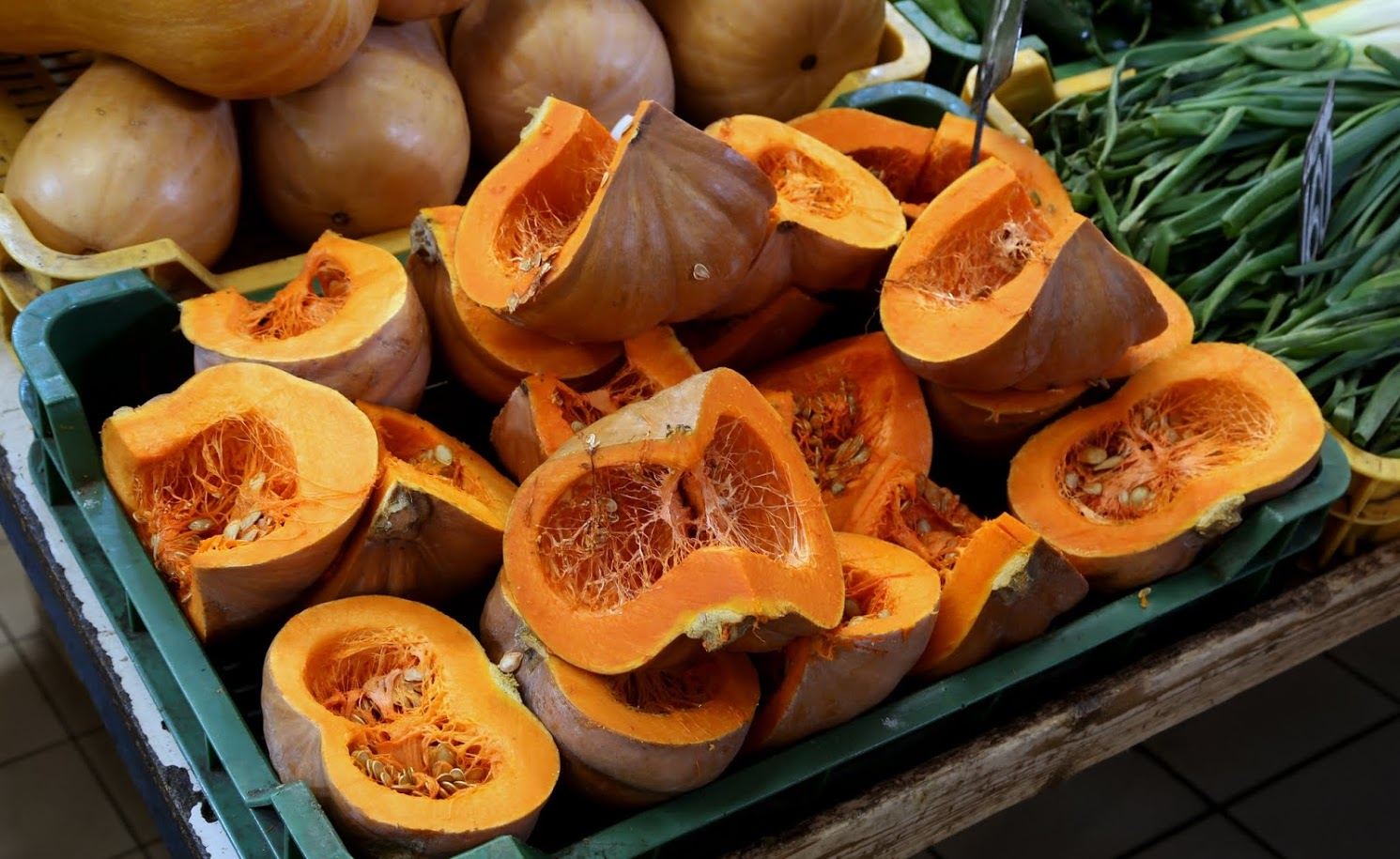
