= Samu Pecz =

Hungarian architect (1854–1922)

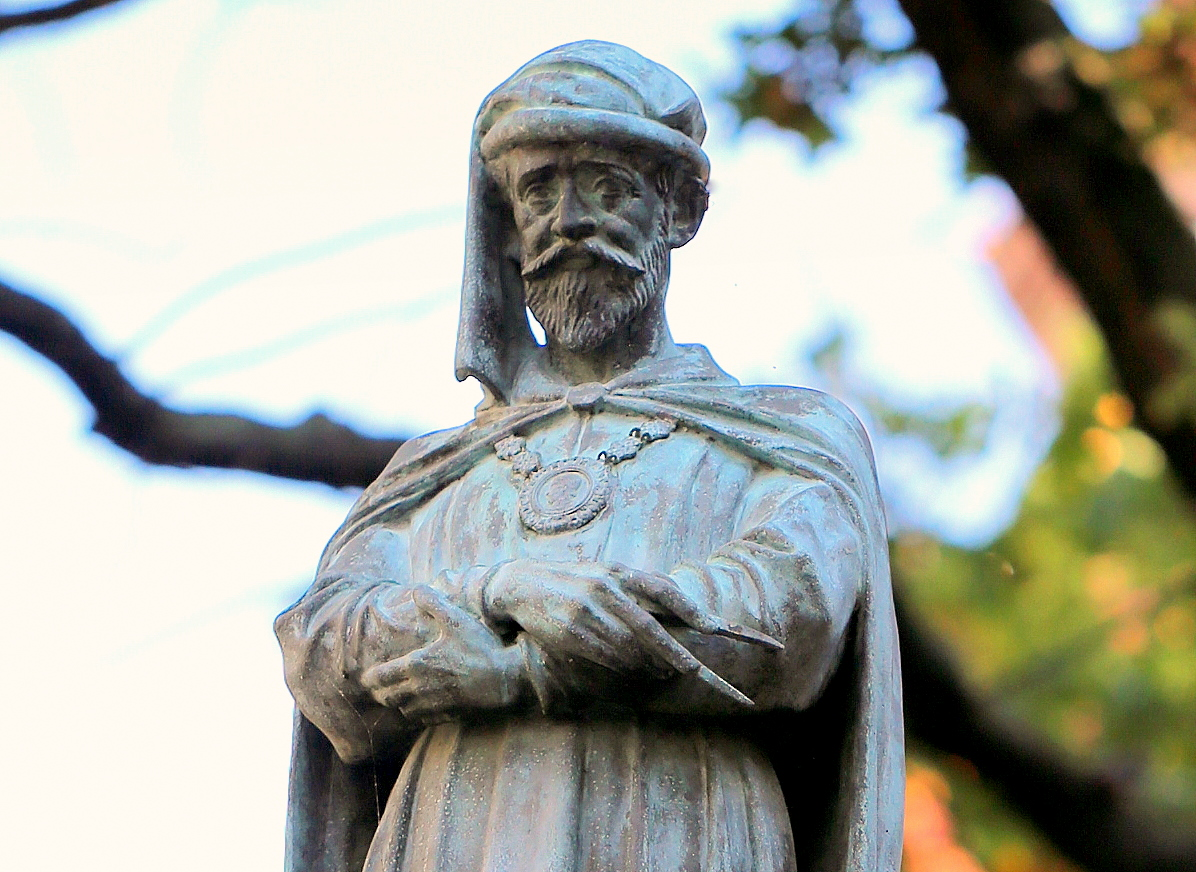
- Statue of Samu Pecz
- Born: Samu Petz; 1 March 1854; Pest, Kingdom of Hungary
- Died: 1 September 1922; Budapest, Hungary
- Education: Vienna Academy of Fine Arts, Vienna; University of Stuttgart, Stuttgart
- Occupation: Architect
- Practice: Theophil Hansen; Frigyes Schulek; Alajos Hauszmann
- Buildings: Matthias Church

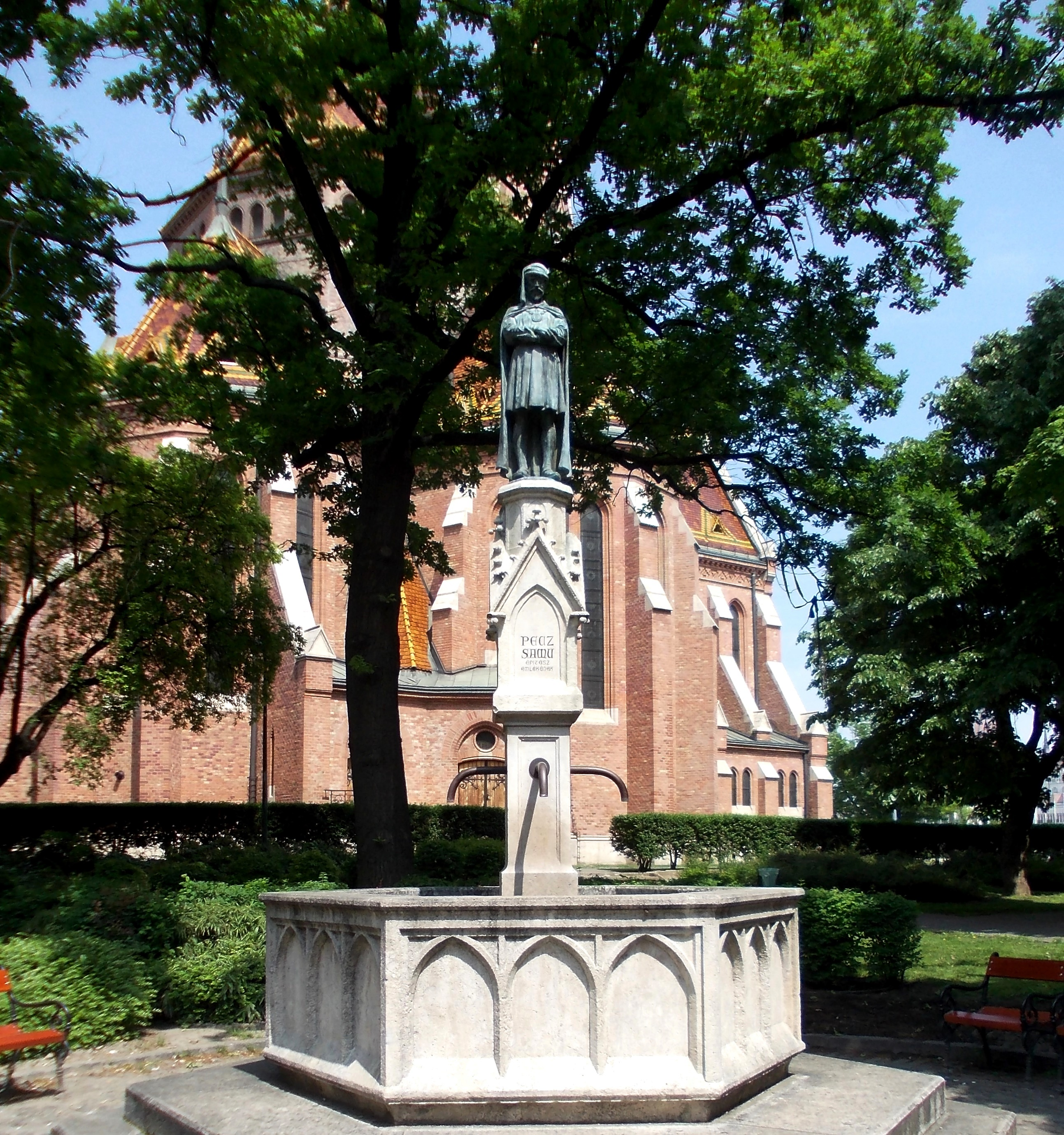
Pecz Samu Monument in Budapest

Samu Pecz (born as Petz, Pest, 1 March 1854 – Budapest, 1 September 1922) was a Hungarian architect and academic.

== Career ==
Pecz studied at the technical universities of Budapest and Stuttgart and then at the Vienna Academy of Fine Arts, under the Danish architect Theophil Hansen, the builder of the Austrian Parliament Building, Musikverein, and Stock Exchange buildings in Vienna.

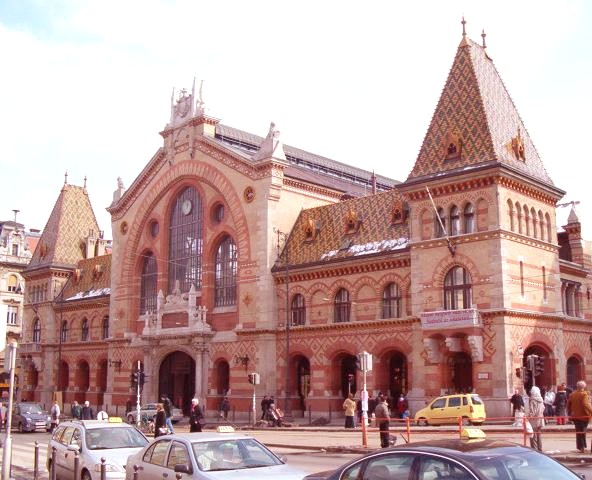
Great Market Hall, Budapest

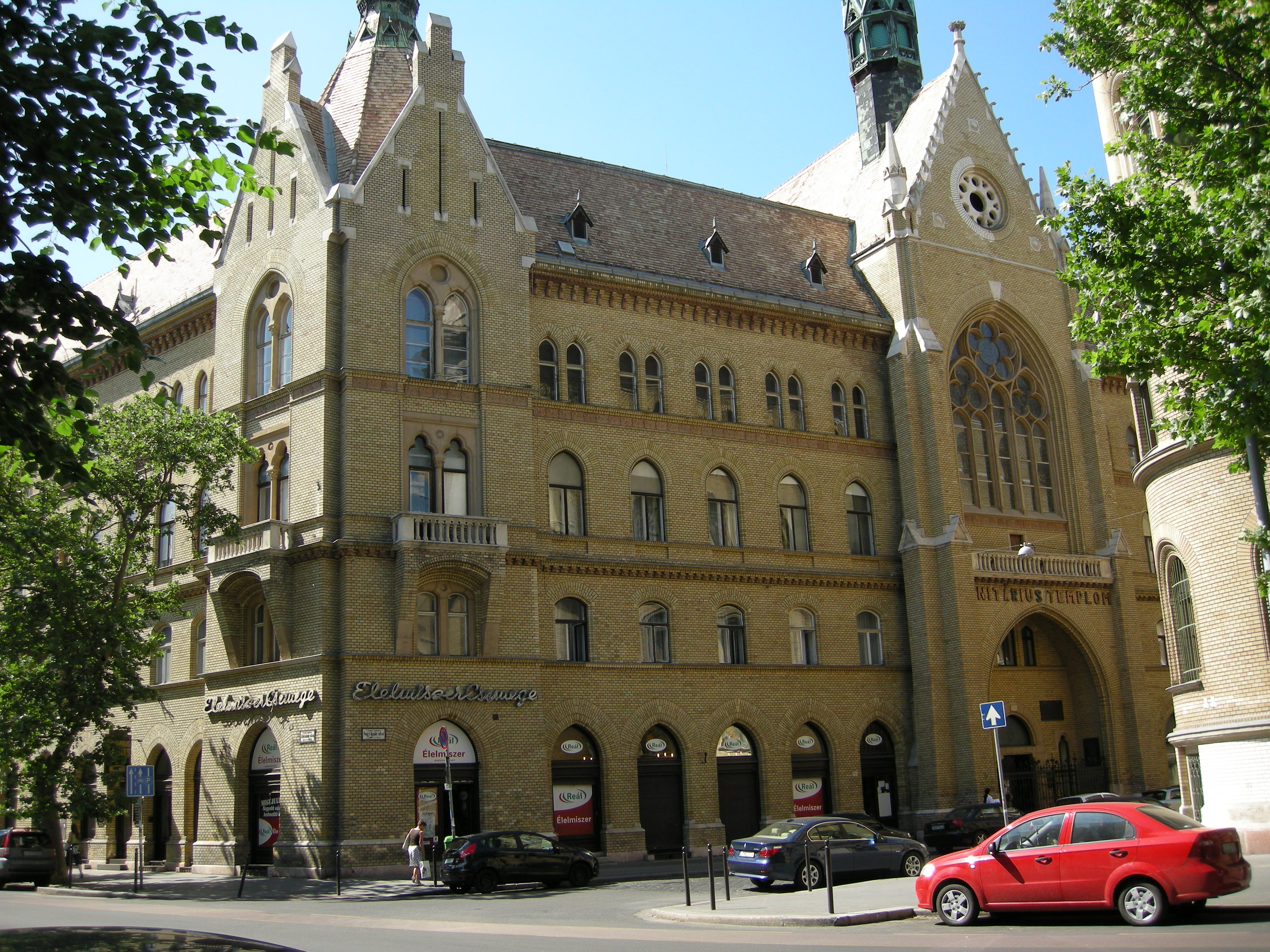
Unitarian Church, Budapest

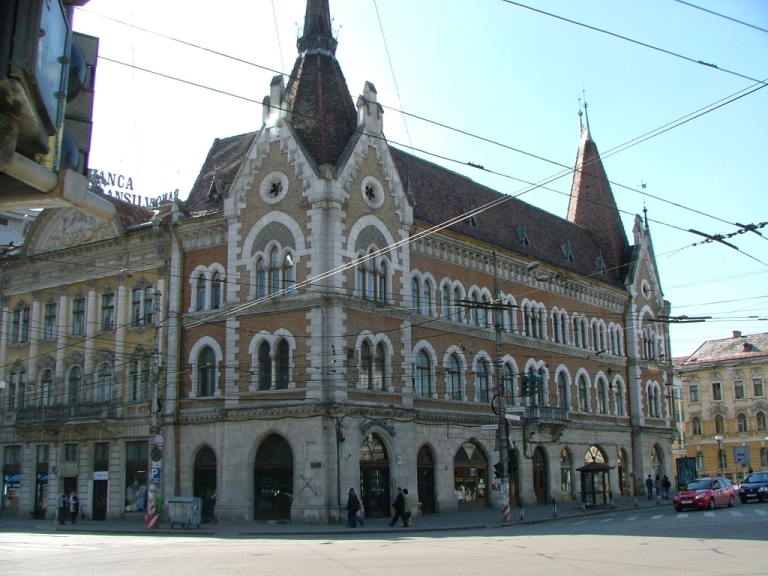
Széky Palace in Cluj-Napoca

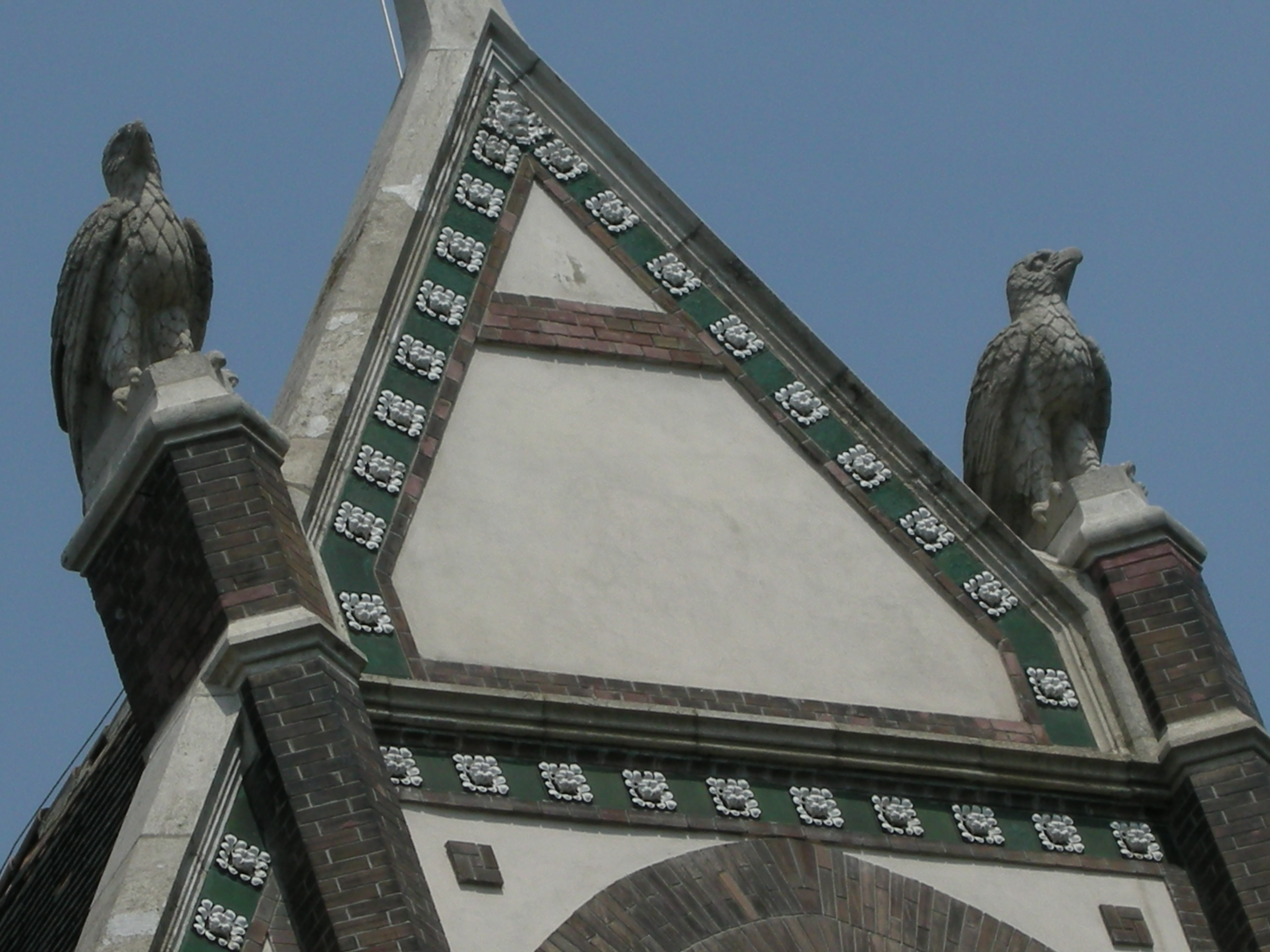
Tenement house on Nagyvárad Square, Budapest

After returning to Budapest he worked with Frigyes Schulek on the Matthias Church in Buda and later in the offices of Alajos Hauszmann. At this time he familiarised himself with Gothic architecture, particularly in church design. Later, Pecz worked in the technical university under Schulek and Imre Steindl and became a private lecturer there in 1887. In 1888, at the age of 34, he was appointed full professor of the department of public building design, a post he held until his death. He designed numerous buildings in the historicist tradition, often using Zsolnay ceramic tiles. His early designs were classicizing; he later worked mainly in the Neo-Romanesque and Neo-Gothic styles, and his functional, brick-faced buildings left a mark on parts of Budapest's townscape.

== Main works ==
Country

- Uzhhorod: Elementary school
- Dévaványa: Reformed Church
- Debrecen: Reformed Church on Kossuth Street
- Nagyvárad (now Oradea, Romania): Lutheran church
- Kolozsvár (now Cluj-Napoca, Romania): Széki Palace

Budapest

- District V: Unitarian Church and apartments on Nagy Ignác Street (1886–1887)
- District IX: Great Market Hall on Fővám Square (1894–1896)
- District I: National Archives building in Buda Castle (1913–1920; completed by Károly Nagy in 1939)
- District I: Reformed Church on Szilágyi Dezső Square (1892–1895)
- District VII: Fasori Lutheran Church and Fasori Gimnázium
- District XI: Technical University Library on Budafoki Street
- District VIII: "Gólyavár" on Múzeum blvd.
- District IX: Tenement house on Nagyvárad Square

== Writings ==
(in Hungarian)

- Introduction to Greek stonework (A görög kőszerkezetek ismertetése) (Budapest, 1886)
- On the development of ancient Christian architecture (Az ókeresztény templom-építészet fejlődése (Budapest, 1886)
- On the building of Protestant churches (A protestáns templomok építéséről) (Budapest, 1888)
