= Szilágyi Dezső Square Reformed Church =

Church building in Budapest, Hungary

Coordinates: 47.5038°N 19.0390°E

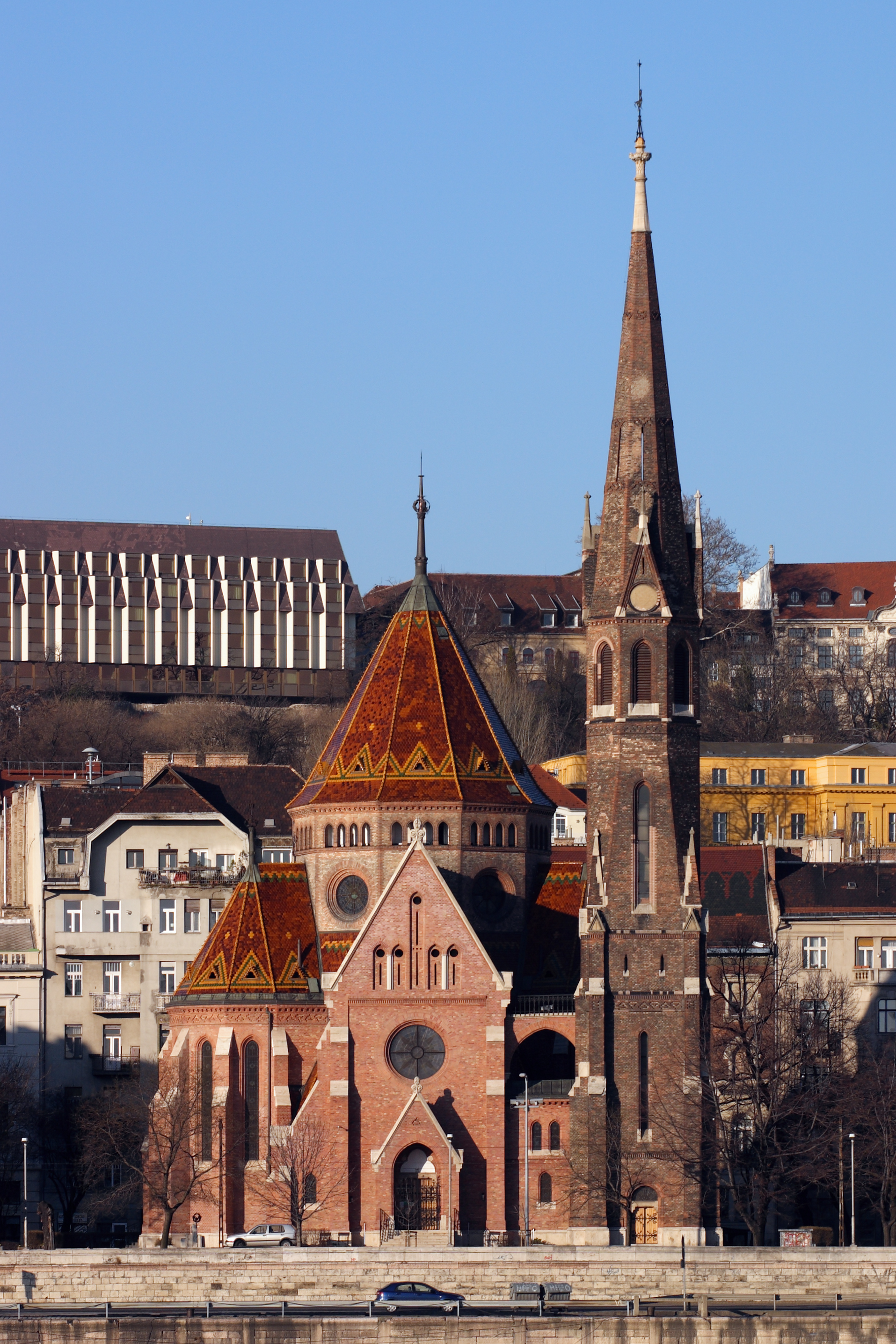
The church facade

Szilágyi Dezső Square Reformed Church is a Protestant church in Budapest. It was built by Samu Pecz from 1893 to 1896.

== Gallery ==
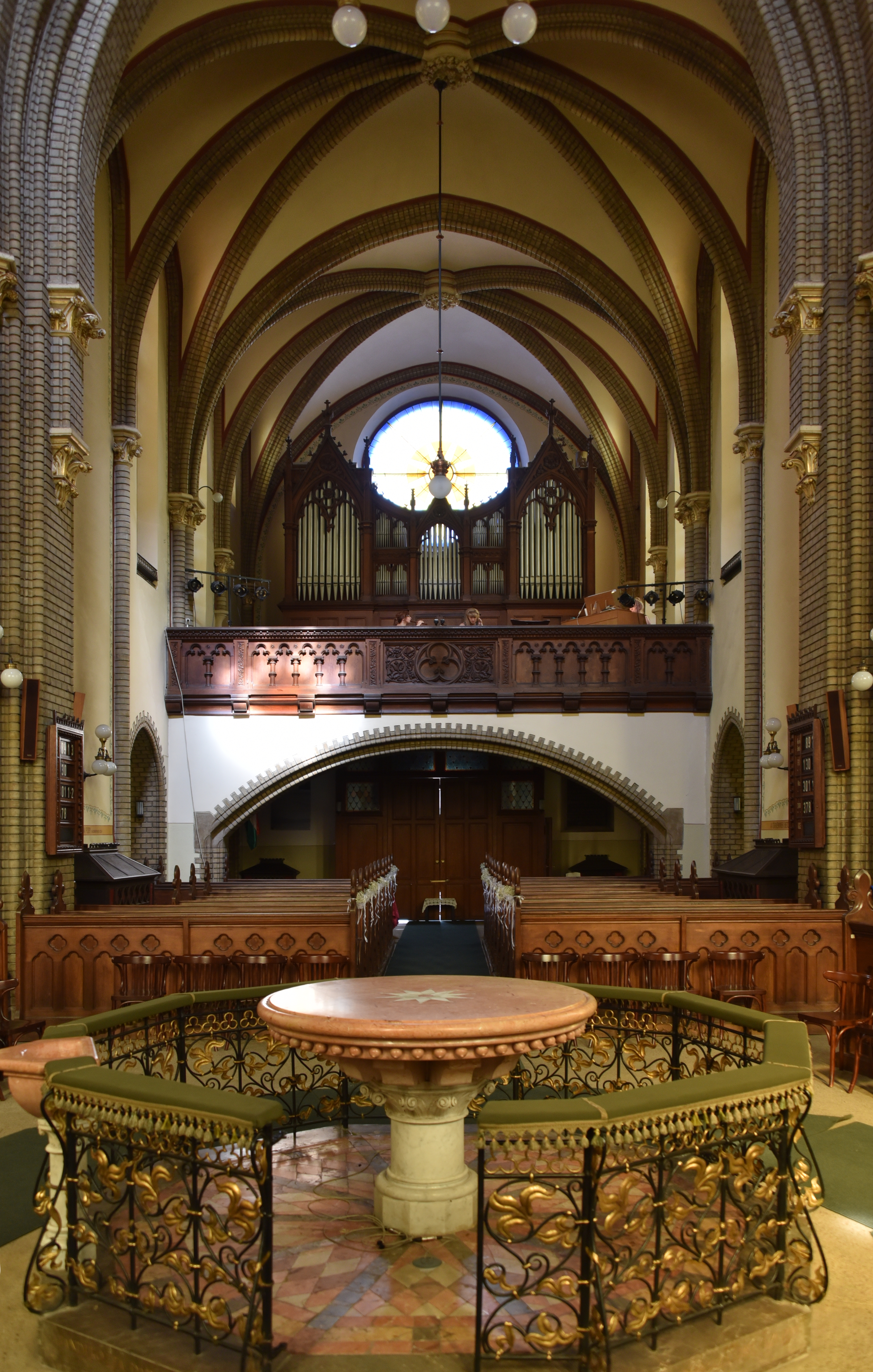
Interior, east

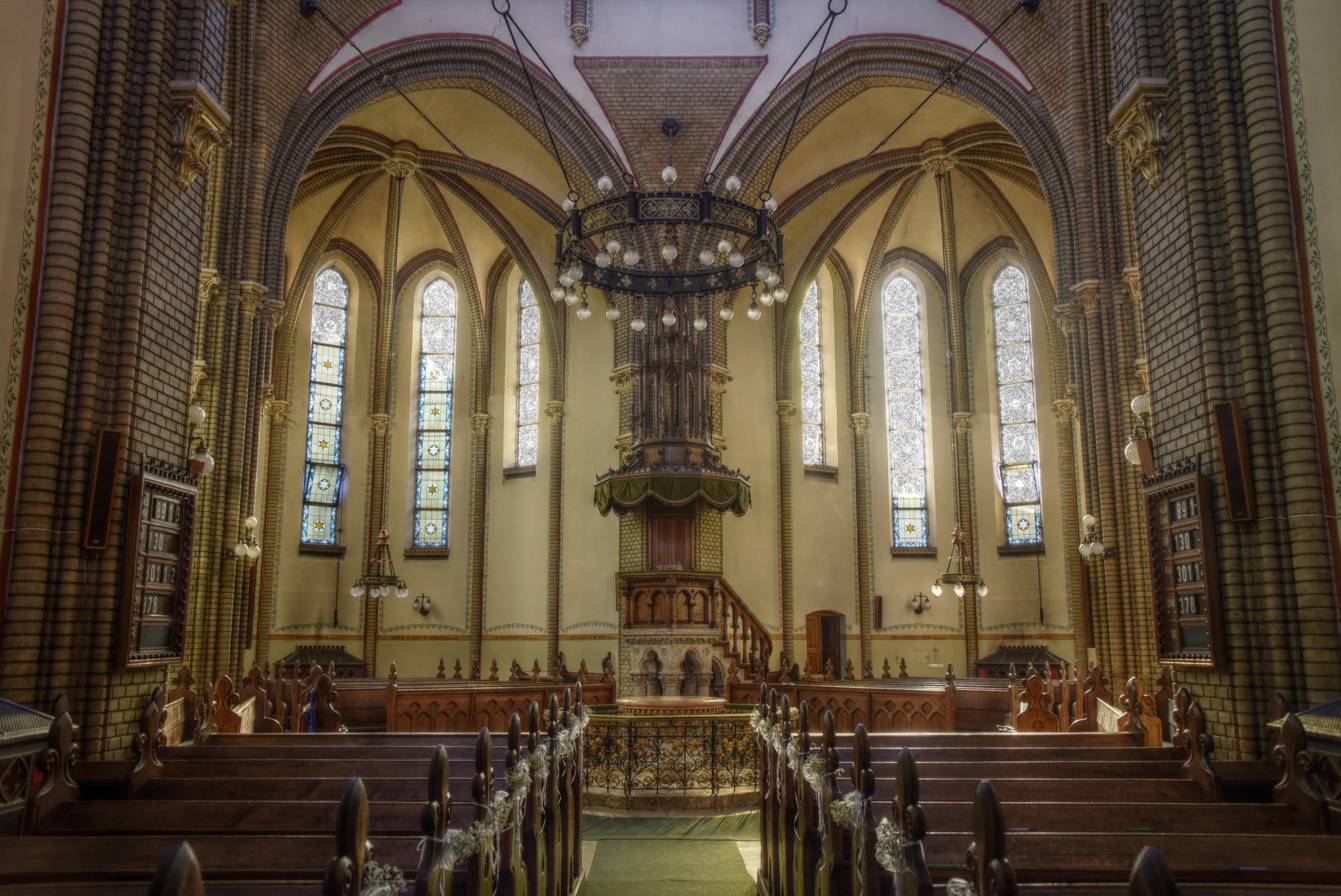
Interior, west

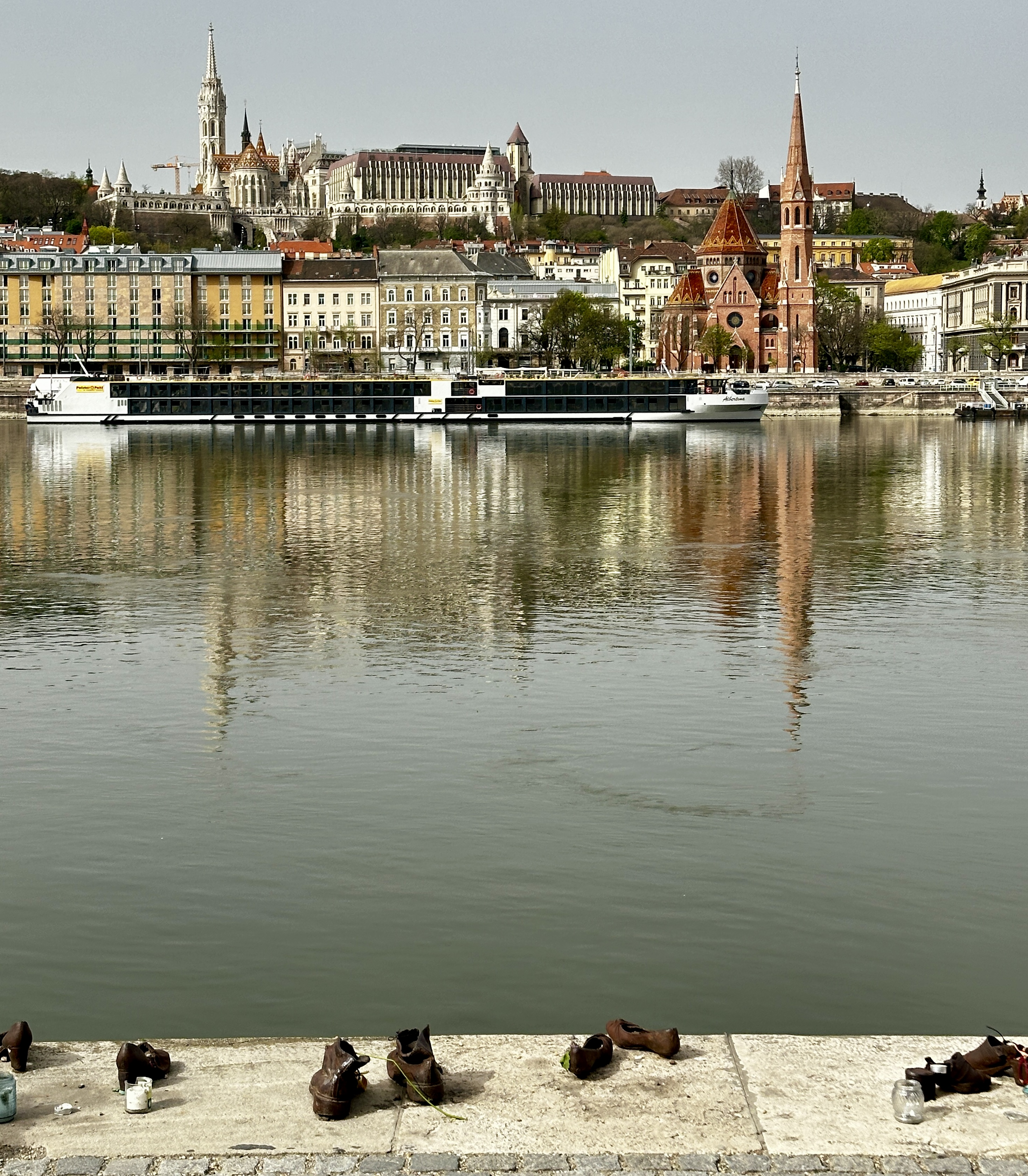
View from "Shoes on the Danube"
