= Széki Palace, Cluj-Napoca =

Heritage site in Cluj County, Romania

Coordinates: 46.773727°N 23.587767°E

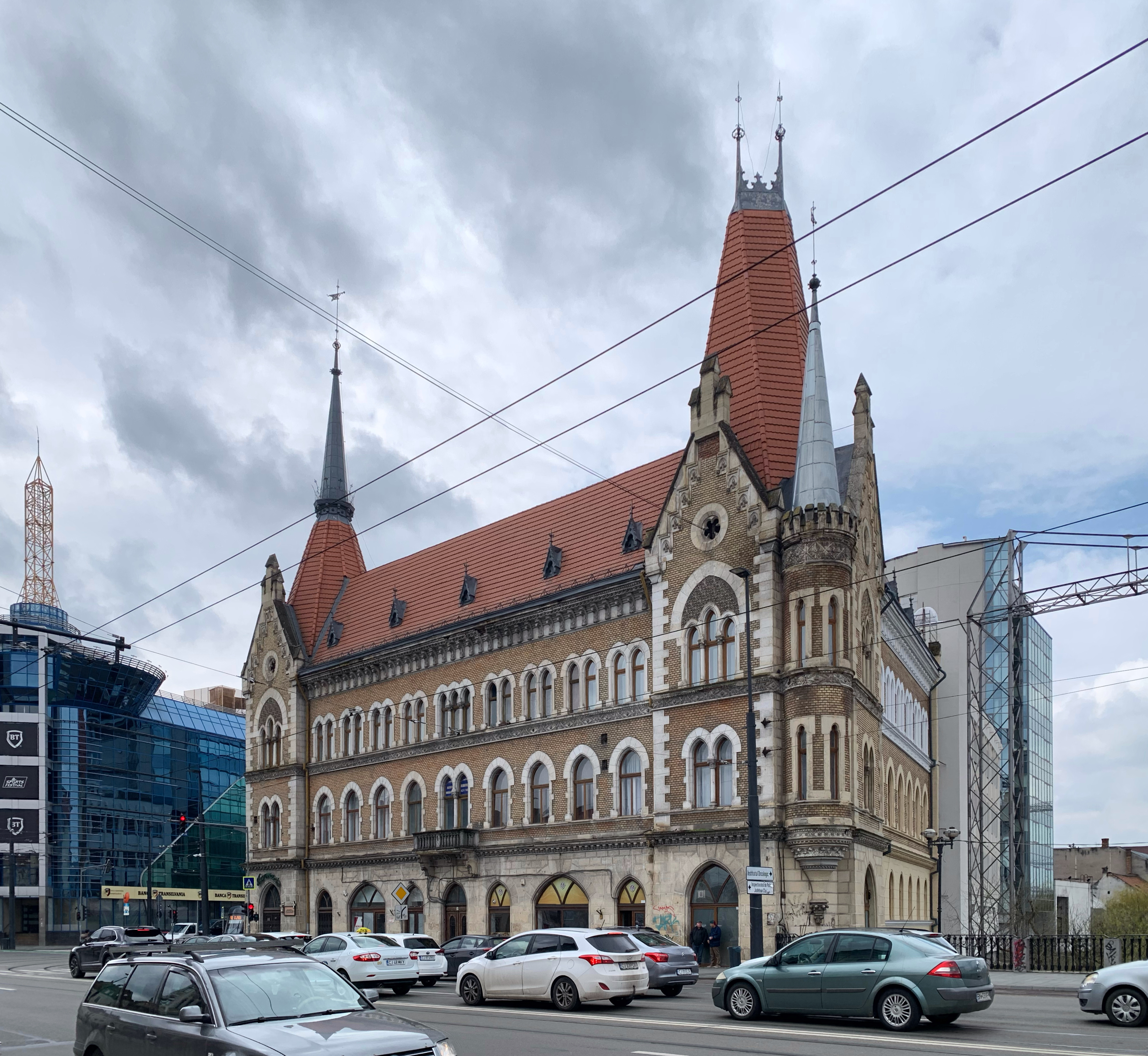
The Széki Palace

The Széki Palace in Cluj-Napoca is a Gothic Revival building on the shore of Someşul Mic River. It was built in 1893 for the university teacher and pharmacist Miklós Széki by the Hungarian architect Samu Pecz. It is classified as a historic monument by the Romanian Ministry of Culture.
