= List of places in Cluj-Napoca =

This is a list of the most important tourist sites in Cluj-Napoca, Romania.

== Historical places ==
=== Places of worship ===
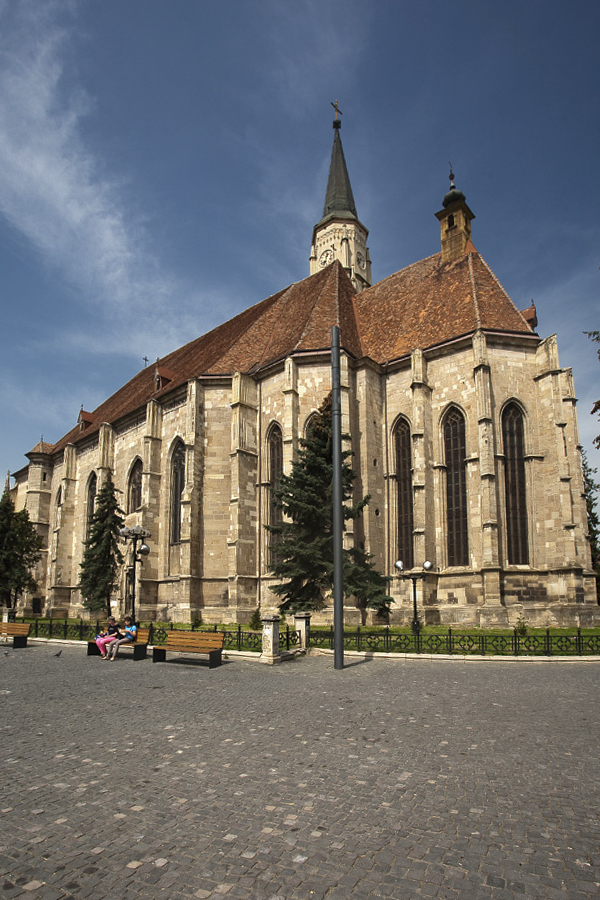
St. Michael's Church, one of the tallest in the country

- Bob Church
- Calvaria Church
- Church on the Hill
- Evangelical Church
- Franciscan Church
- Greek Catholic Cathedral in Cipariu Square (under construction)
- Metropolitan Cathedral
- Minorites' Church
- Neolog Synagogue
- Piarists' Church
- Ss. Peter and Paul Church
- St. Michael's Church
- Unitarian Church
- Reformed Church on Wolves' Street (today Kogălniceanu Street)

=== Historical buildings ===
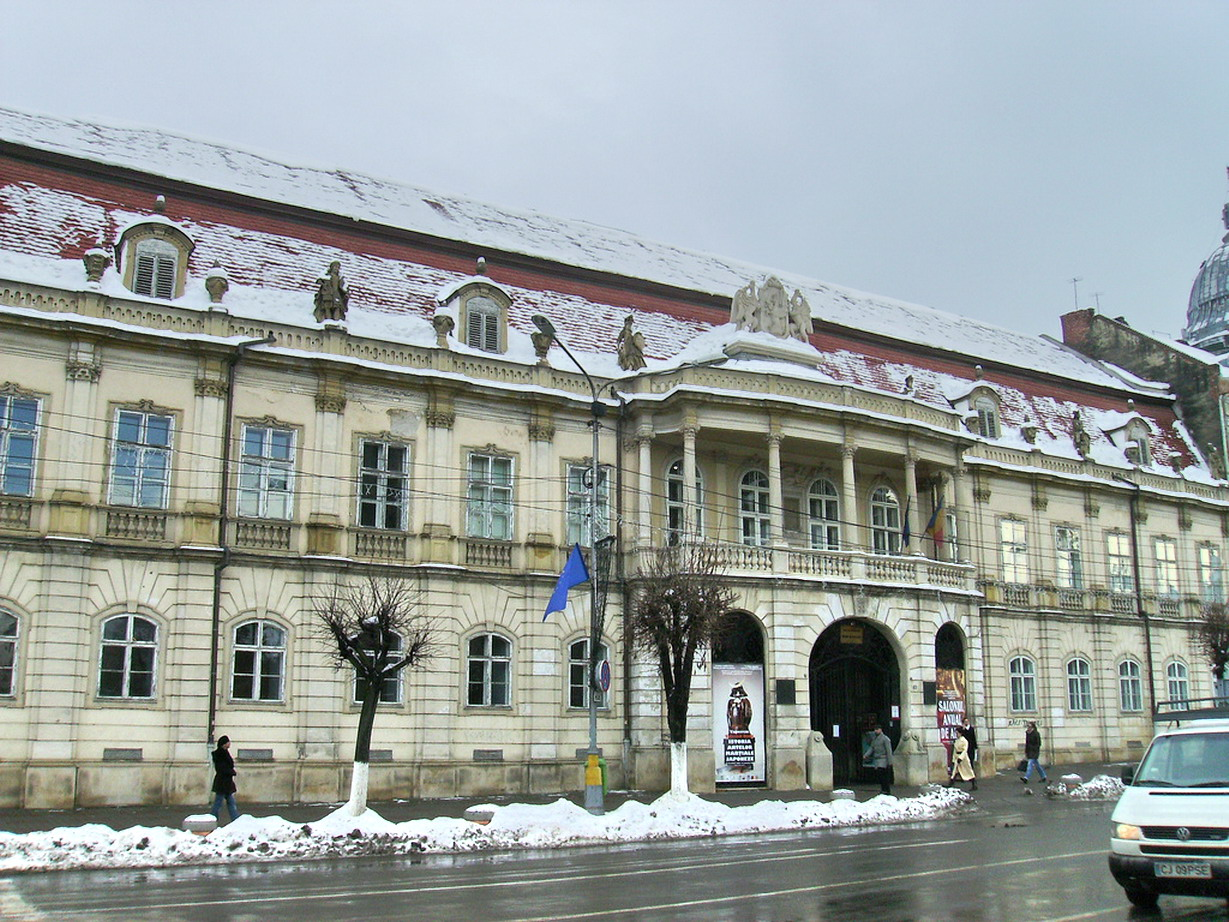
The Art Museum, housed in the Bánffy Palace

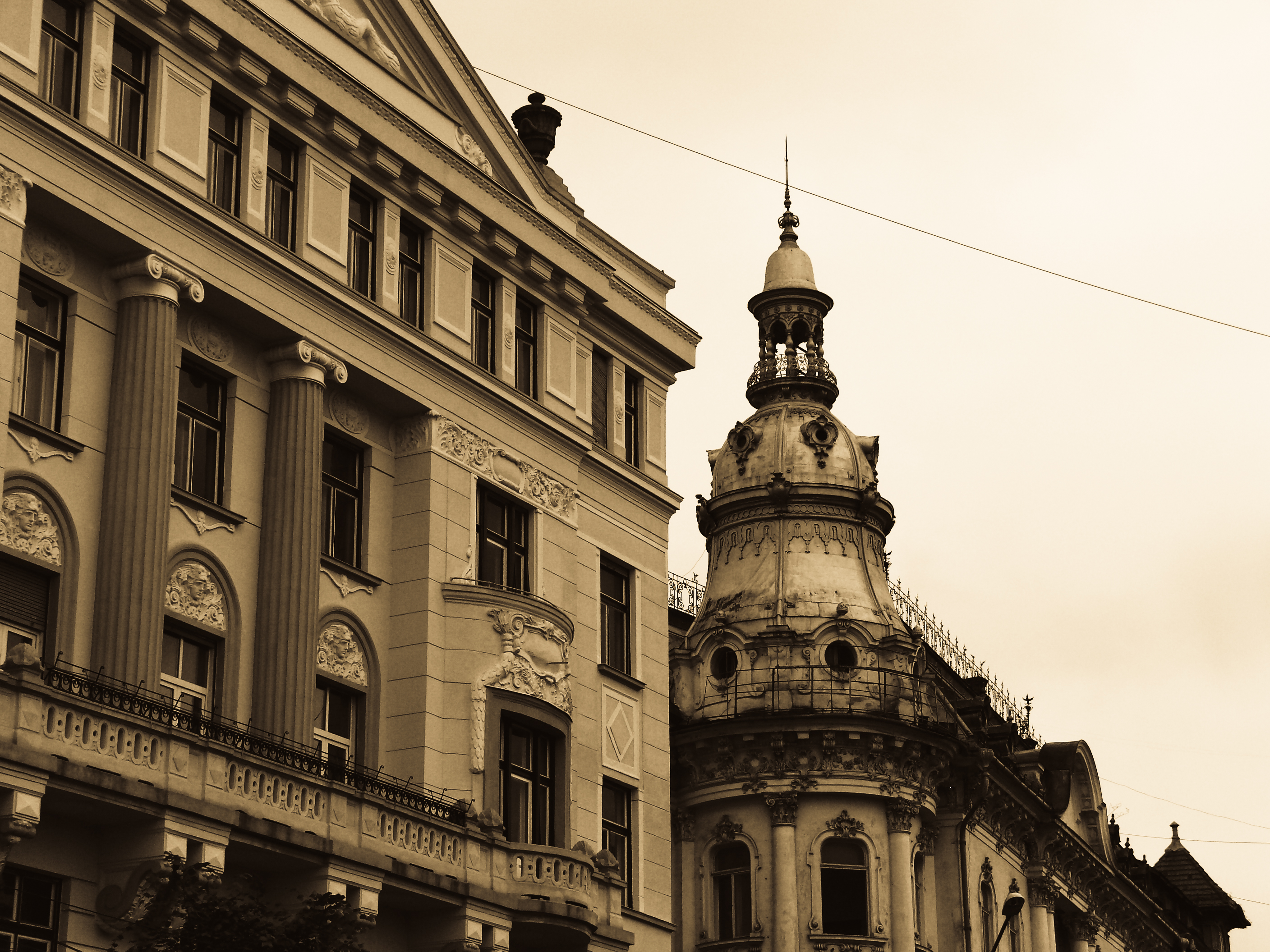
Sebestyén Palace and Continental Hotel

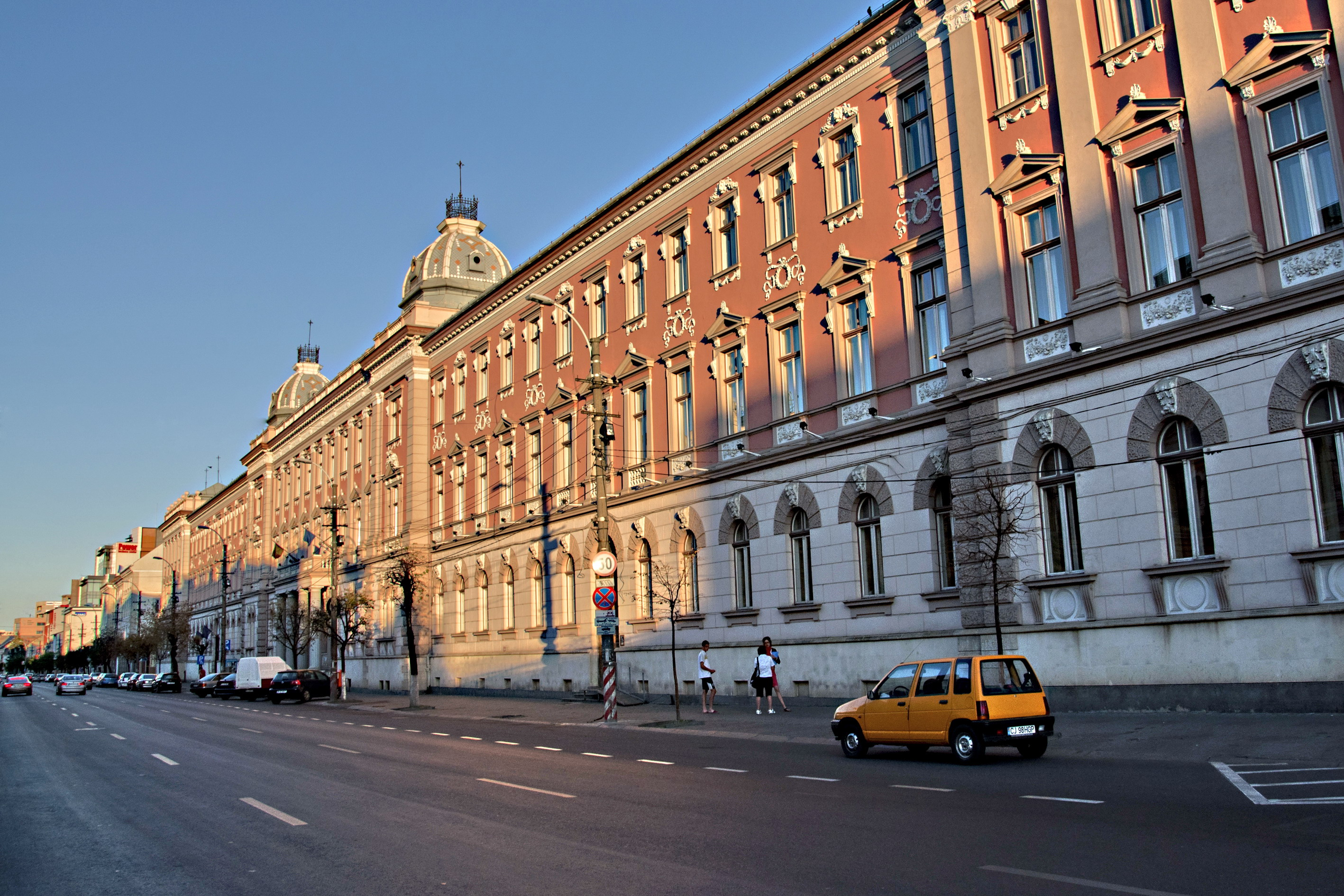
Palace of Justice

- Babos Palace
- Bánffy Palace
- Beldi Palace
- Benkő House
- Berde Palace
- Biasini Hotel
- City Hall
- Convictus Nobilium
- Elian Palace
- Filstich-Kemény House
- Firemen's Tower
- Heltai House
- Hintz House
- Jósika Palace
- Kovary House
- Master's House
- Matthias Corvinus House
- Mikes Palace
- Mint House
- New York Hotel (also known as Continental Hotel)
- Orthodox Archbishopric Palace
- Palace of Finance
- Palace of Justice
- Petrechevich-Horvath House
- Piuariu-Molnar House
- Postal Palace
- Prefecture Palace
- Reduta Palace
- Regional Railway Palace
- Rhédey Palace
- Széki Palace
- Tailors' Bastion
- Teleki Palace
- Telephone Palace
- Toldalagi-Korda Palace
- Tranzit House (former Poalei Tzedek Synagogue)
- Urania Palace
- Wass Palace
- Wolphard-Kakas House

=== Statues and historical monuments ===
- Carolina Obelisk
- Cross on the Cetățuie
- Horea, Cloșca and Crișan Statuary Group
- Lupa Capitolina
- Matthias Corvinus Monumental Ensemble
- ”Shot Pillars” Monument
- Școala Ardeleană Statuary Group
- Statue of Avram Iancu
- Statue of Baba Novac
- Statue of St. George
- Virgin Mary Statue

== Cultural buildings ==
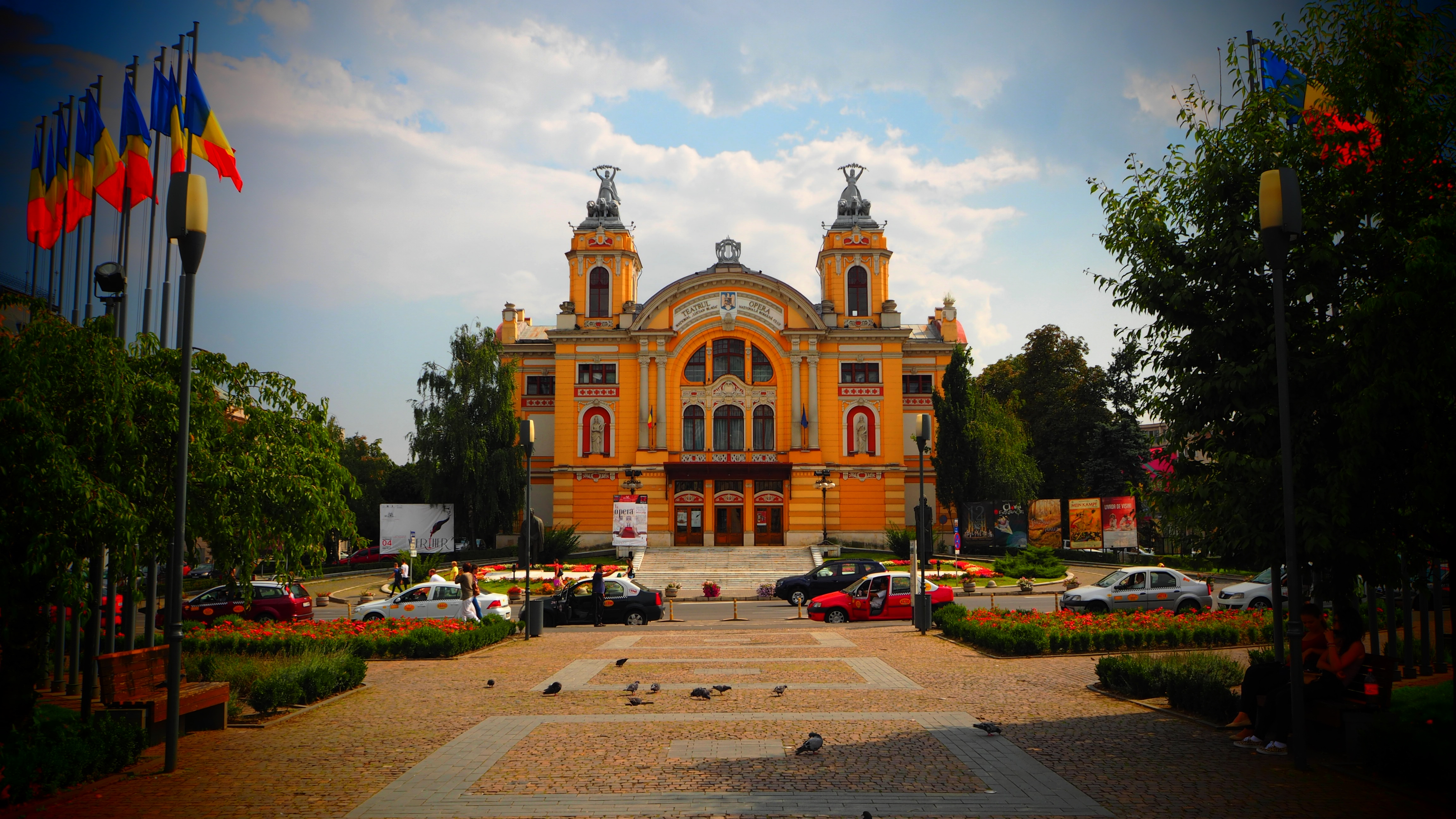
Romanian State Theater and Opera

- Lucian Blaga National Theater
- Hungarian Theatre of Cluj
- Romanian National Opera in Cluj-Napoca
- Cluj-Napoca Hungarian Opera
- Transylvania State Philharmonic Orchestra

== Museums ==
- Albert Györkös Mányi Memorial House
- Art Museum
- Ethnographic Museum of Transylvania
- National Museum of Transylvanian History
- Pharmacy Museum
- Museums of the Babeș-Bolyai University:
  - Aquarium
  - Botanical Museum
  - Emil Racoviță Museum of Speleology
  - History Museum of the University
  - Museum of Mineralogy
  - Museum of Paleontology and Stratigraphy
  - Vivarium
  - Zoological Museum

== Malls and shopping centers ==
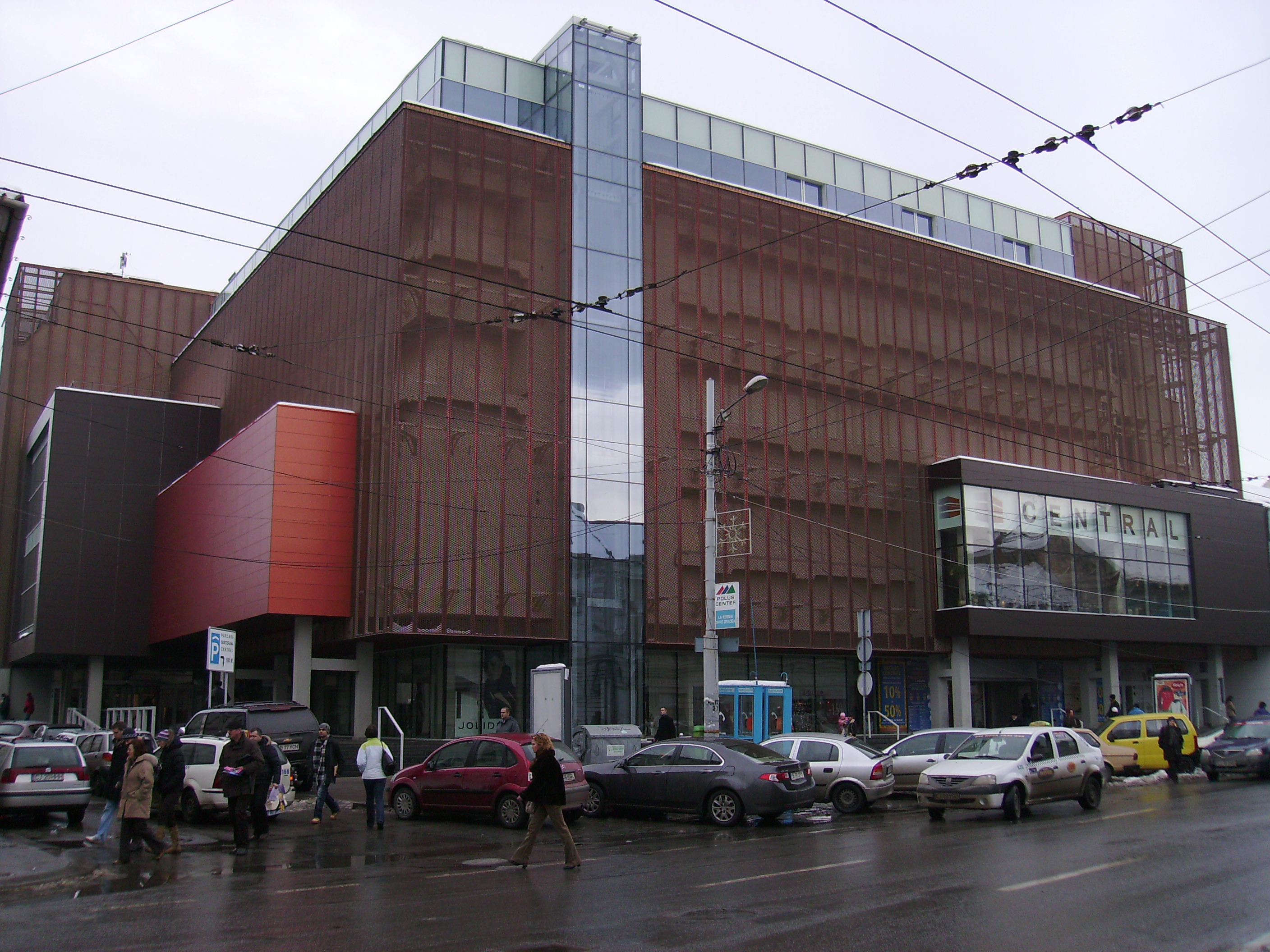
Central department store on King Ferdinand I Street

- Iulius Mall Cluj
- VIVO! Cluj-Napoca
- Central department store
- Cora
- Sigma Shopping Center
- Sora Shopping Center
- Winmarkt

== Gardens, parks and forests ==
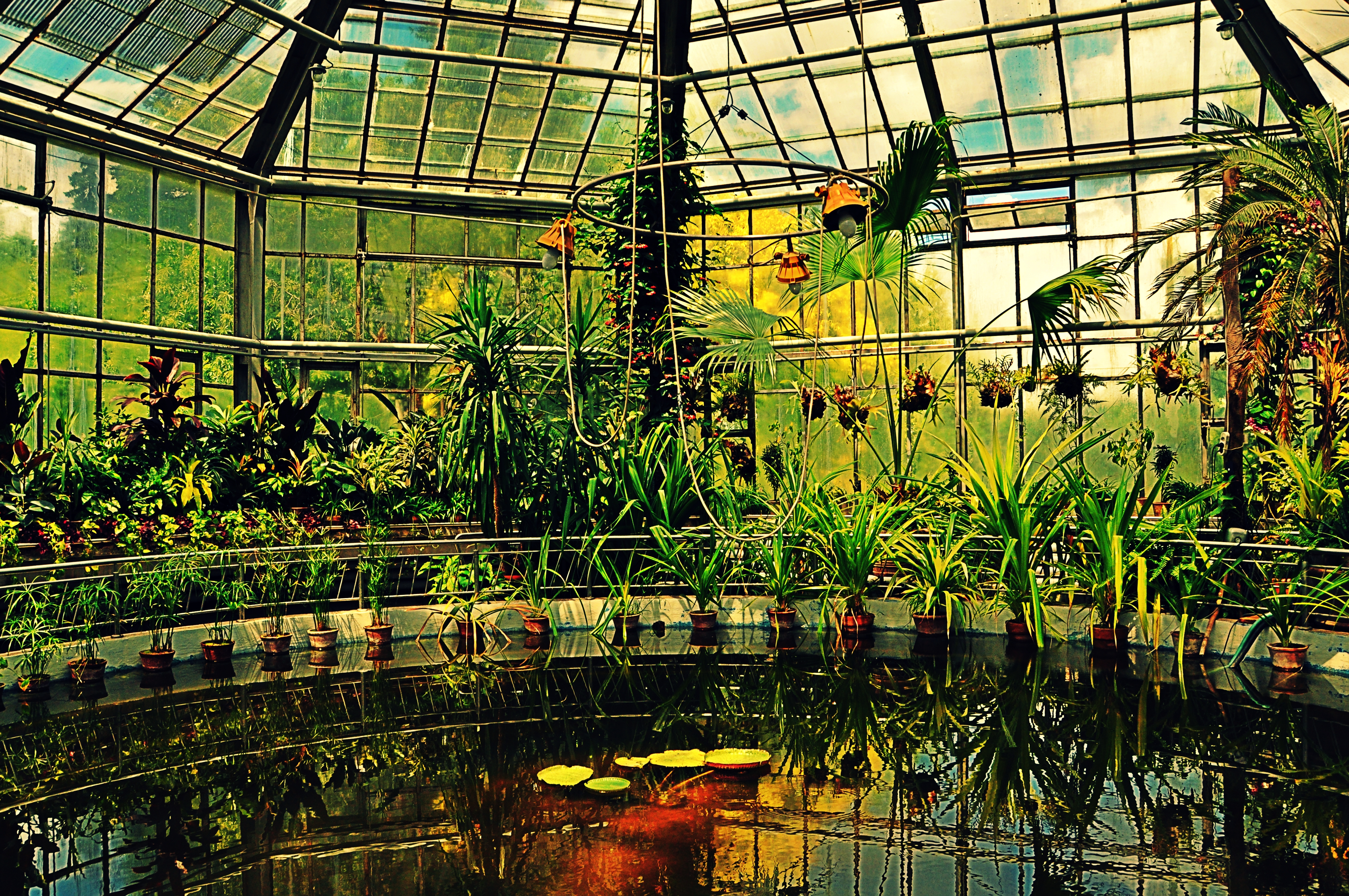
Main greenhouse in Alexandru Borza Botanical Garden

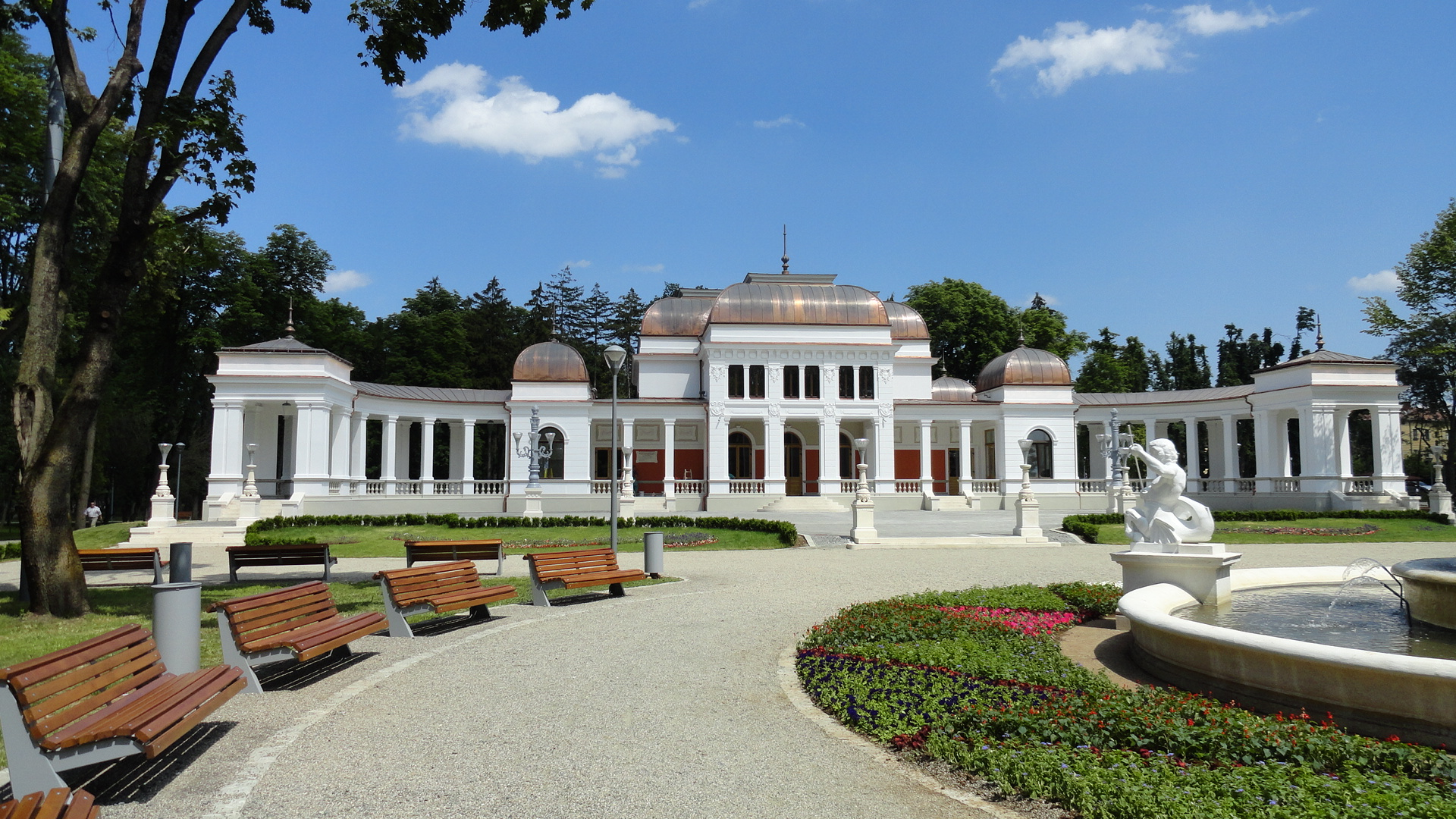
The renovated building of the former Casino (Central Park)

- Alexandru Borza Botanical Garden
- Cetățuia Park
- Colina Park
- Hoia Forest
- Iuliu Hațieganu Sports Park
- Iuliu Prodan Park
- Mercur Park
- Park of the Railwaymen
- Romulus Vuia Ethnographic Park
- Roses Park
- Simion Bărnuțiu Central Park

== Squares ==
- Avram Iancu Square
- Stephen the Great Square
- Union Square

== Cemeteries ==
- Hajongard Cemetery
- Israelite Cemetery
- Mănăștur Cemetery

== Venues ==
Cluj Arena

- Cluj Arena
- Polyvalent Hall
