= List of museums in Romania =

This is an incomplete list of museums located in Romania:

== In Wallachia ==
=== Other ===
- Vergu-Mănăilă House – Buzău
- Craiova Art Museum – Craiova
- Museum of Oltenia – Craiova
- Luminiș – Sinaia
- Iron Gates Region Museum – Drobeta-Turnu Severin
- Reșița Steam Locomotive Museum - Reșița

== In Dobruja ==
- Aegyssus Citadel - Tulcea [ro]
- "Casa Avramide" Museum of Art Collections - Tulcea
- Danube Delta Natural History Museum - Tulcea
- Danube Delta Ecotouristic Center - Tulcea
- Enisala Citadel - Enisala [ro]
- Halmyris Citadel - near Murighiol
- Museum of Ethnography and Popular Art - Tulcea
- Museum of History and Archaeology - Tulcea
- Museum of Oriental Art (Babadag) - Babadag [ro]
- Nava Republica Museum - Tulcea [ro]
- Old Lighthouse Museum (Sulina) - Sulina [ro]
- Panait Cerna House Museum - Cerna
- Paleo-Christian Basilica (Niculițel) - Niculițel [ro]
- Peasant Farmhouse Museum - Enisala
- Tulcea Art Museum – Tulcea

== In Moldavia ==
=== Iaşi ===
- Moldova National Museum Complex
  - Muzeul de Istorie a Moldovei
    - Union Museum
    - Mihail Kogălniceanu Memorial Museum
    - Alexandru Ioan Cuza Memorial Museum (in Ruginoasa)
    - Cucuteni Neolithic Archeological Site Museum
  - Ethnographic Museum of Moldavia
    - Museum of Vineyard and Wine (in Hârlău)
  - Art Museum of Moldavia
  - Ștefan Procopiu Science and Technology Museum
    - Poni - Cernătescu Memorial Museum
- National Museum of Romanian Literature in Iași
  - Ion Creangă Museum
  - Dosoftei Museum
  - Mihai Codreanu Museum
  - Vasile Pogor Museum
  - Otilia Cazimir Museum
  - History of Romanian Theatre Collection
  - Mihail Sadoveanu Museum
  - George Topîrceanu Museum
  - Mihai Eminescu Museum
  - Nicolae Gane Museum
  - House of Museums
    - Romanian Literature Museum
    - Museum of Poetry
    - Museum of the Jewish Theatre in Romania
    - Museum of Iași Pogrom
    - Museum of Childhood under Communism
  - Vasile Alecsandri Museum (in Mircești)
  - Constantin Negruzzi Museum (in Hermeziu)
  - Garabet Ibrăileanu museum point (in Târgu Frumos)
  - Ionel Teodoreanu museum point (in Golăiești)
- Natural History Museum
- Iași Municipal Museum
- Alexandru Ioan Cuza University Museum
- Metropolitan Museum of Iași
- Cotnari Princely Court
- Cotnari Archaeological Reserve

=== Piatra Neamț ===
- Archaeology Museum Piatra Neamț (Muzeului de Istorie și Arheologie)
- Cucuteni Neolithic Art Museum (Muzeul de Artă Eneolitică Cucuteni Piatra-Neamţ)
- Museum of Natural Sciences (Muzeul De Ştiinţe Naturale)
- Museum of Ethnography (Muzeul de Etnografie)

=== Other ===
- "Hanul Domnesc" (The Princely Inn) Ethnographic Museum – Suceava
- Wooden Spoons Museum, Câmpulung Moldovenesc
- Museum of Romanian History (Muzeul de Istorie Roman) – Roman
- Ion Creangă Memorial Museum – Târgu-Neamţ
- Neamt Citadel Museum (Muzeul Cetatea Neamţ) – Târgu-Neamţ

== In Transylvania ==
=== Cluj-Napoca ===
- Transylvanian History Museum
- Ethnographic Museum of Transylvania
- Cluj-Napoca Bánffy Palace
- Art Museum of Cluj-Napoca
- Hintz House (Pharmacy Museum)

=== Sibiu ===
- Brukenthal National Museum
- ASTRA National Museum Complex
- Sibiu Steam Locomotives Museum

=== Other ===
- Museum of Dacian and Roman Civilisation – Deva
- Teleki Library – Târgu-Mureş
- Crișeni – Museum of Straw Hats
- Baia Mare Artistic Center Museum of Art – Baia Mare

== See also ==
- Culture of Romania
- National Register of Historic Monuments in Romania
- List of historical monuments in Romania
