= Hoia-Baciu Forest =

Paranormal attraction in Romania

Hoia Baciu Forest Romanian: Pădurea Hoia-Baciu Hungarian: Hója erdő
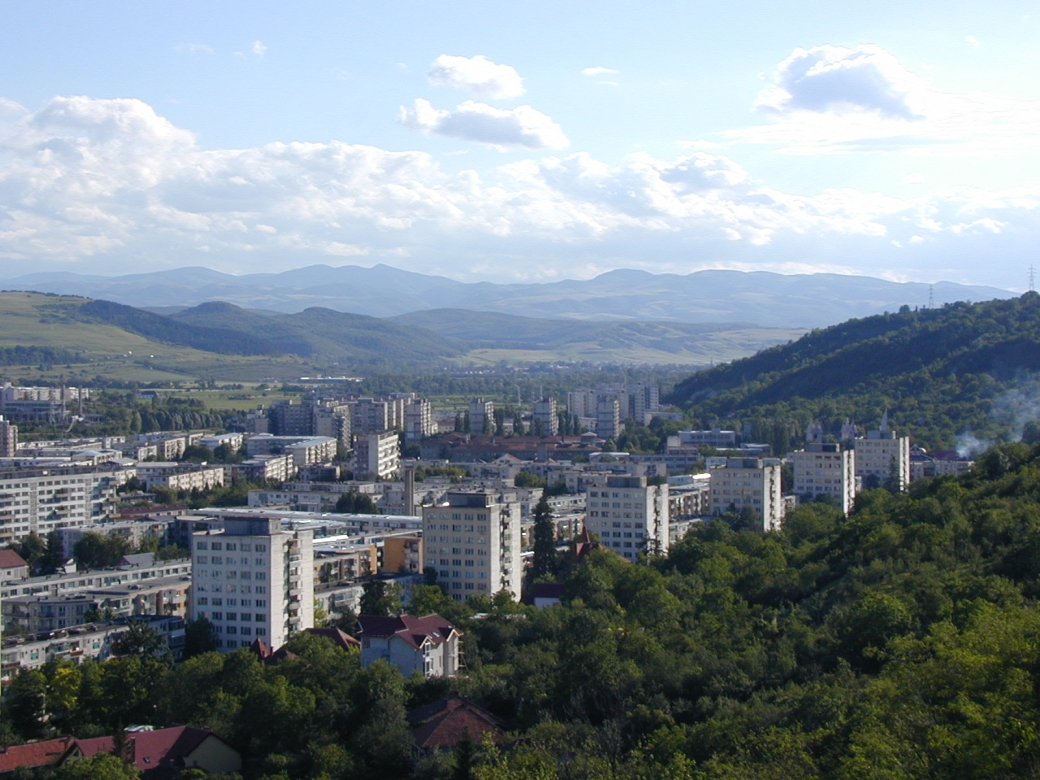
- Southern slope of Hoia Hill (right), Grigorescu (left), and the valley of the Someșul Mic River (background)

- Location within Romania

Geography
- Location: Cluj County, Transylvania, Romania
- Coordinates: 46°46′26″N 23°31′19″E
- Area: 295 hectares (729.0 acres)

Administration
- Website: www.hoiabaciuforest.com

The Hoia-Baciu Forest (Romanian: Pădurea Hoia-Baciu, Hungarian: Hója erdő) is a forest situated to the west of the city of Cluj-Napoca, near the open-air section of the Ethnographic Museum of Transylvania. The forest is used as a common recreation destination. In recent years a biking park has been added to the forest, along with areas for other sports such as paintball, airsoft and archery.

== Geography ==
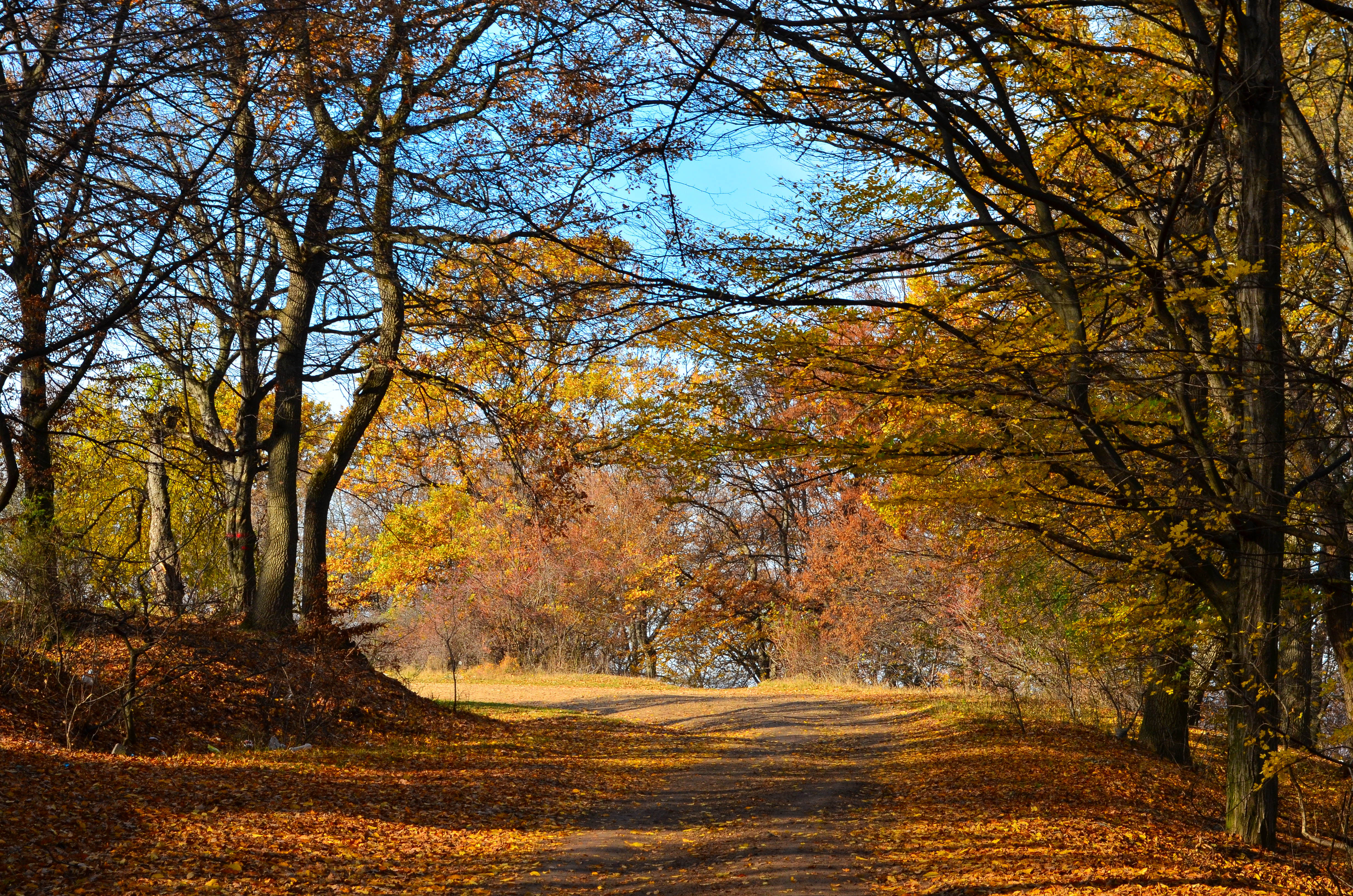
Autumn in Hoia-Baciu Forest, November 2012

The forest covers an area of about 3 square kilometers. Its southern border begins on a ridge which runs east–west. It does not contain the steep southern slope of the hill, which rises from the Someșul Mic River. To the north, the forest ends on a smoother slope, which meets the Nadăș River.

The eastern end of the forest is bordered by the Tăietura Turcului, an artificial valley that divides the hill from north to south and contains a traffic road. The west end of the forest reaches the northeastern slope of the Dealul Melcilor, nearby the Mujai Forest, which extends further westward. The Bongar valley runs along the south end of this side, which contains a downy oak grove unique to the southern steppe. Part of the northeastern end of the forest is bordered by Valea Lungă (Long Valley), which passes through Eocene limestone and forms Cheile Baciului, a valley with asymmetric slopes. A small natural lake is located upstream from Cheile Baciului, at the border of the forest. There are several springs with potable water at the north edge of the forest, in Valea Lungă.

== Legends ==
According to legend, the Hoia-Baciu Forest is a hotspot of paranormal phenomena. Many ghost stories and urban legends contribute to its popularity as a tourist attraction. Skeptics say these are just stories for entertainment and lack any testable evidence.

The Hoia-Baciu Forest has been featured in paranormal documentary TV shows, from Ghost Adventures to Destination Truth, the Swedish series Spökjakt. It was featured on Expedition X.

The forest is also the setting for the horror video game Deadly Quiet, which includes themes of supernatural elements.

== Bibliography ==
- Adrian Pătruț - Fenomenele de la Pădurea Hoia-Baciu (Clujul și imprejurimile, a tourist map)

== See also ==
- List of places in Cluj-Napoca
