= Mănăștur =

District in the city of Cluj-Napoca, Romania

Coordinates: 46°45′21.19″N 23°33′7.84″E

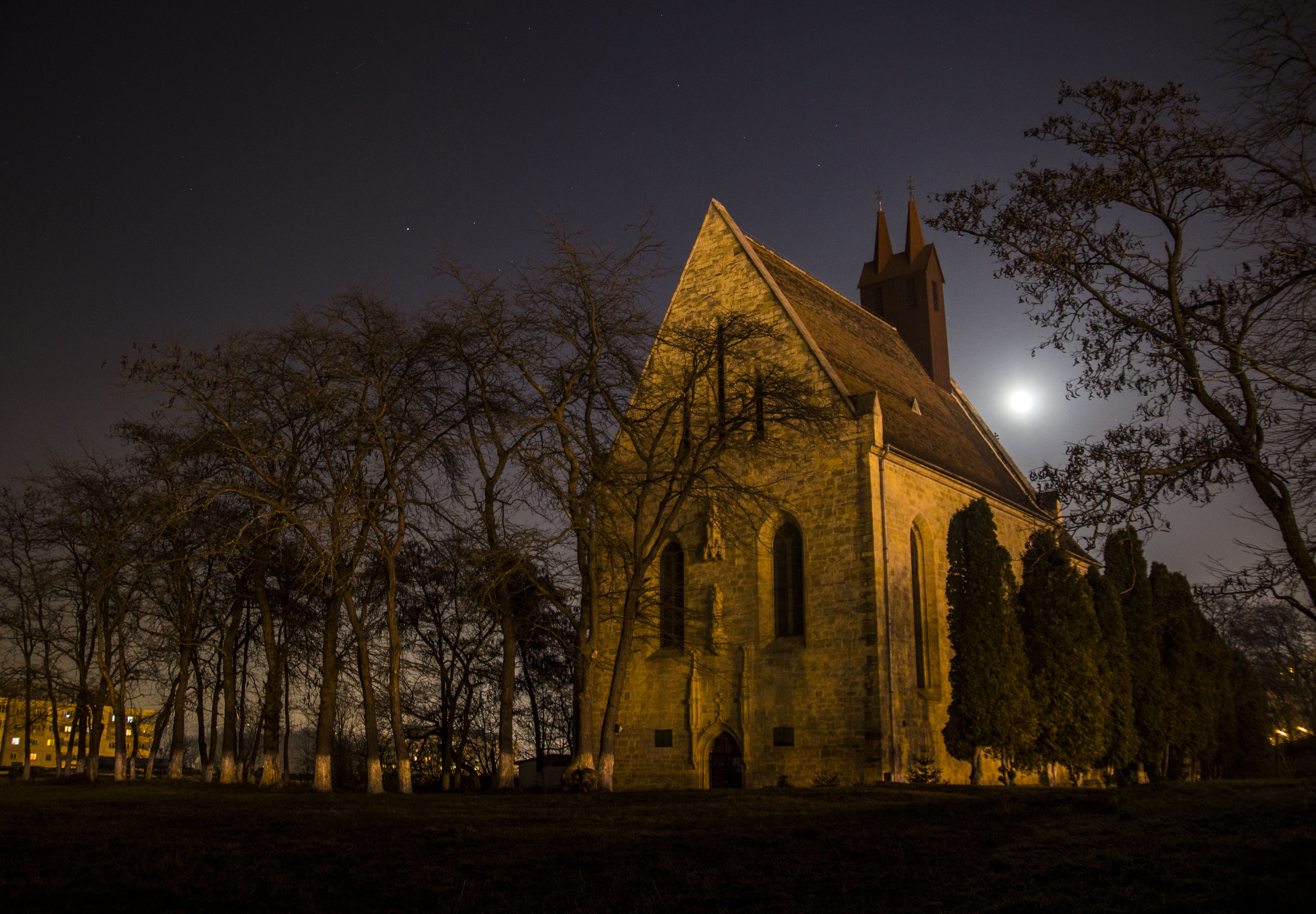
Calvaria Church

Mănăștur (Hungarian: Kolozsmonostor; German: Abtsdorf) is a district of the Romanian city of Cluj-Napoca, which has been a part of the city since 1895.

Its population as of 2007 was of approximately 126,600.

== History ==
=== Middle Ages ===
Mănăștur is home to the Calvaria Church, a Benedictine abbey built in the 9th-10th centuries.

=== 20th century ===
After the German-Italian arbitrated 1940 Second Vienna Award, Mănăștur (Kolozsmonostor) was situated 1 km from the border with Romania, at Erdőfelek/Feleacu.

The district was changed during Nicolae Ceaușescu's systematisation urban reconstruction program, when many blocks of flats were built, which housed a mainly working class population.

== See also ==
- Grădinile Mănăștur, a nearby district
