= Wooden Spoons Museum =

Museum in Câmpulung Moldovenesc, Romania

- Muzeul Lingurilor de Lemn
- Location: No. 1, street Gh. Popovici, Câmpulung Moldovenesc, Suceava County, Romania
- Coordinates: 47°31′58.03″N 25°33′5.625″E
- Type: Art museum, folk museum, private museum

The Wooden Spoons Museum (Romanian: Muzeul Lingurilor de Lemn) or Ion Țugui Spoon Museum (Muzeul Lingurilor "Ion Țugui") is a museum in Câmpulung Moldovenesc, in the Suceava County, Romania. It is located in the house where the history professor Ion Țugui lived, at no. 1 in Gh. Popovici Street. Those who now take care of the museum are his descendants, the Mateescu family. The museum houses wooden spoons which were studied and cataloged by Țugui from many regions of Romania (most of them being from Bukovina) but also from other parts of the world. About 10 spoons are placed on each support, which are labeled with their age, their place of origin and, if known, their owner. Some of the foreign spoons come from countries such as Japan, Madagascar, Pakistan, Tanzania, the United States and several others. Many of them were donated by foreign tourists or exchanged for Romanian spoons with Țugui. The museum also has ladles, a collection of more than 500 erasers, ceramic objects and coins.

According to the World Record Academy, the museum holds the record for the largest collection of wooden spoons in the world. Estimates about the number of spoons collected by Țugui and displayed in the museum vary from 3,500 to 4,200, 5,000 or over 6,000.

== See also ==
- List of museums in Romania
