= Grădinile Mănăștur =

Grădinile Mănăștur (Romanian for Mănăștur Gardens) is one of the districts of Cluj-Napoca in Romania, located around the street Calea Mănăștur. It is sometimes confused with the Mănăștur district. Grădinile Mănăștur houses the Ursus Breweries and the University of Agricultural Sciences and Veterinary Medicine of Cluj-Napoca.
