= Cluj-Napoca Tailors' Bastion =

Coordinates: 46°46′05″N 23°35′50″E

The Tailors' Tower
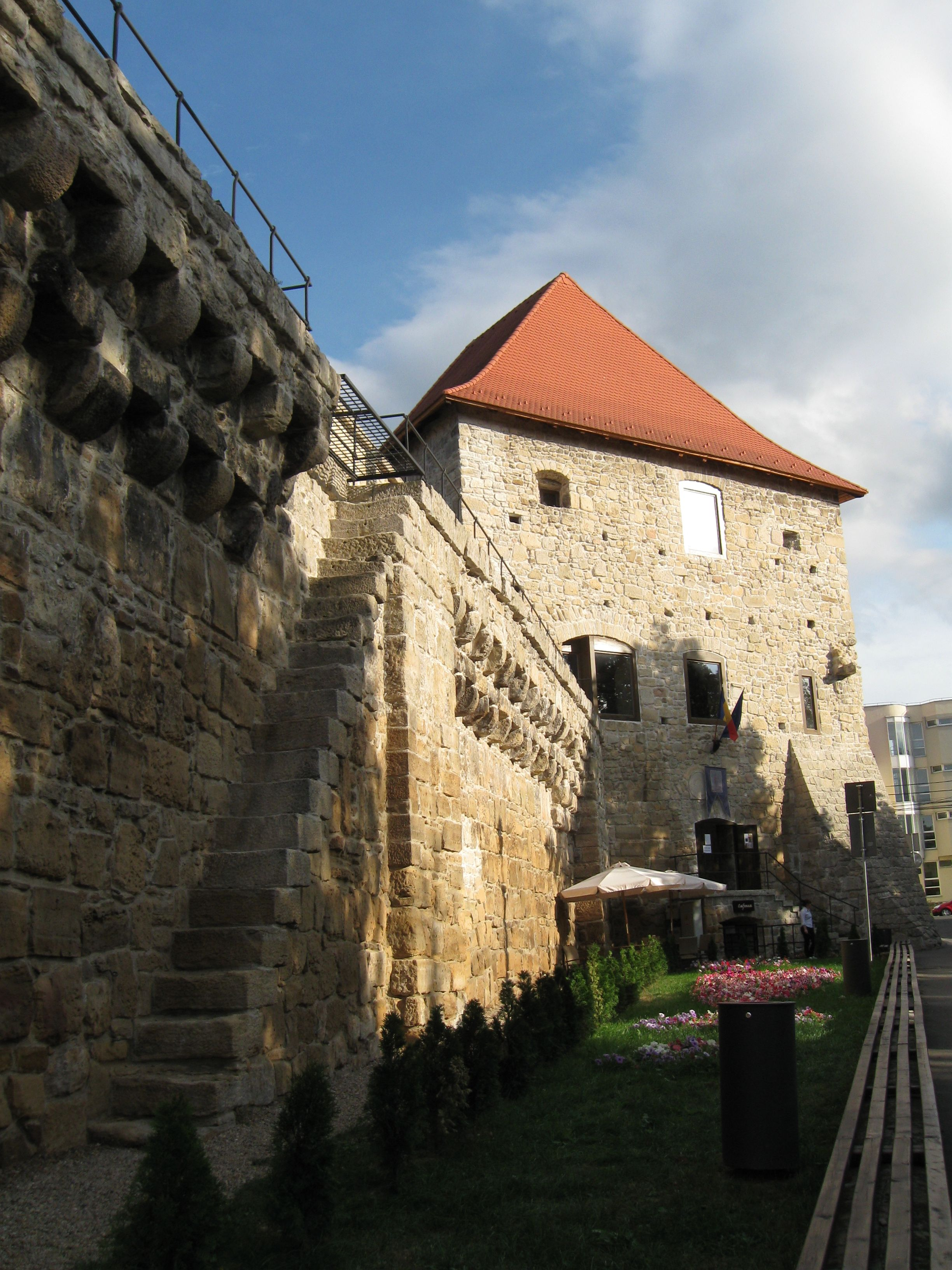
- The tower and the remaining wall
- Interactive map of the The Tailors' Tower area

General information
- Location: Cluj-Napoca, Romania
- Construction started: 15th century
- Completed: 15th century

The Cluj-Napoca Tailors' Tower (Romanian: Bastionul Croitorilor din Cluj-Napoca, Hungarian: Szabók bástyája) is located at the southeast corner of the old Cluj-Napoca citadel. It was built in the 15th century and rebuilt between 1627 and 1629, assuming its present form. It was named after the Tailors' Guild, who took care of and guarded this part of the city. Near the tower — where Baba Novac, general of Michael the Brave and Saski priest, was killed in 1601 by General Basta — there is a statue of Baba Novac.

Deserted until 2007, the municipality of Cluj-Napoca undertook to include the tower in the city's touristic itinerary, financing its restoration.

The tower is now a Centre for Urban Culture, based on a project offered by the Transilvanian Branch of the Architects’ Chamber of Romania in collaboration with BAU (Birou de Arhitectura si Urbanism). The Centre hosts a flexible exhibition space on its three floors being also used for different events such as conferences.

== See also ==
- List of cities with defensive walls
