= Cluj-Mănăștur Calvaria Church =

Church in Cluj-Napoca, Romania

Coordinates: 46°45′41″N 23°33′28″E

Calvaria Church, Mănăștur, Cluj-Napoca
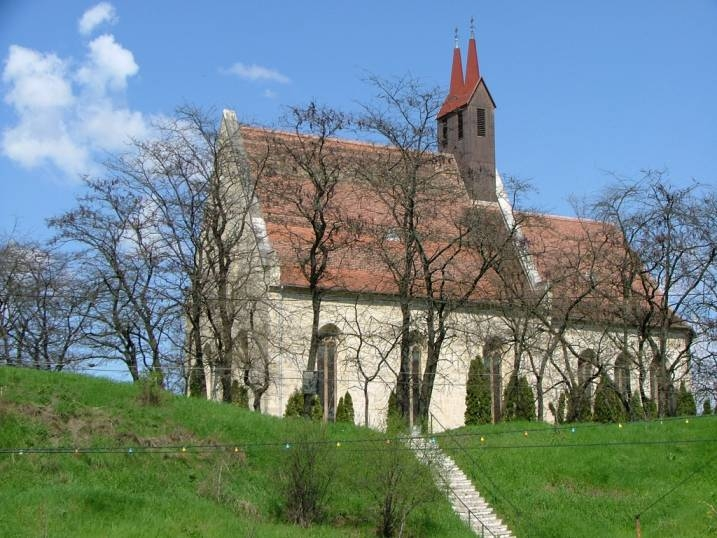

Religion
- Affiliation: Roman Catholic
- Ecclesiastical or organizational status: Church

Location
- Location: Mănăștur, Cluj-Napoca, Romania
- Interactive map of Calvaria Church, Mănăștur, Cluj-Napoca

Specifications
- Dome: 1
- Materials: Stone

Calvaria Church (Romanian: Biserica Romano-Catolică Calvaria de la Cluj-Mănăștur, Hungarian: Kolozsmonostori apátság) was built in the district of Mănăștur in Cluj-Napoca. It was originally founded as a monastery for the Benedictines.

== History ==
The first reference to the Calvaria Church came from 1222 when it was still listed as a Benadictine monastery in a papal bull by Pope Honorius III. In its early years, the monastery had been granted independence from episcopal oversight of the Bishop of Transylvania. This led to two attacks from successive bishops with Bishop Adrian causing damage to the walls and Bishop William burning the papers proving this papal exemption and throwing royal privilege papers confirming it into the Someș river. In response to the loss of documentation, King Andrew II of Hungary requested the Pope renew the privileges, which the Pope did and also granted the abbott the right to wear a bishop's mitre and ring.

In the 16th century, it was transferred to the Jesuits. The Calvaria church suffered numerous attacks throughout its existence, with the final one coming in 1661 where it was mostly destroyed by the Tatars except for the choir loft. From there it was mostly used as a military arsenal until 1896 when the Romanian Greek Catholic Church rebuilt the nave. The Greek Catholic Church subsequently rented the church for their sole worship in exchange for a token 1 Romanian leu in rent. In 1948, the communist authorities of the Socialist Republic of Romania confiscated the church and gave it to the Romanian Orthodox Church. Following the Romanian revolution, between 1991 and 1994, it was shared by both Orthodox and Catholics before being returned to sole Catholic use in 1994 with the Catholics restoring it the next year.

== Image gallery ==
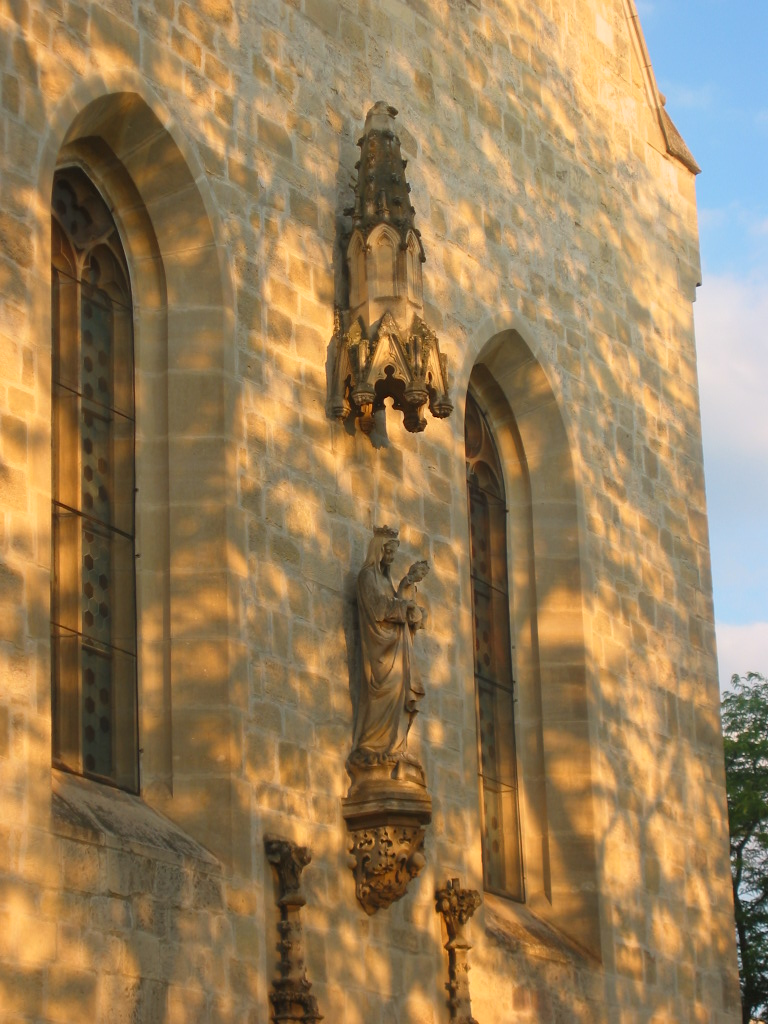
Frontal view of the church

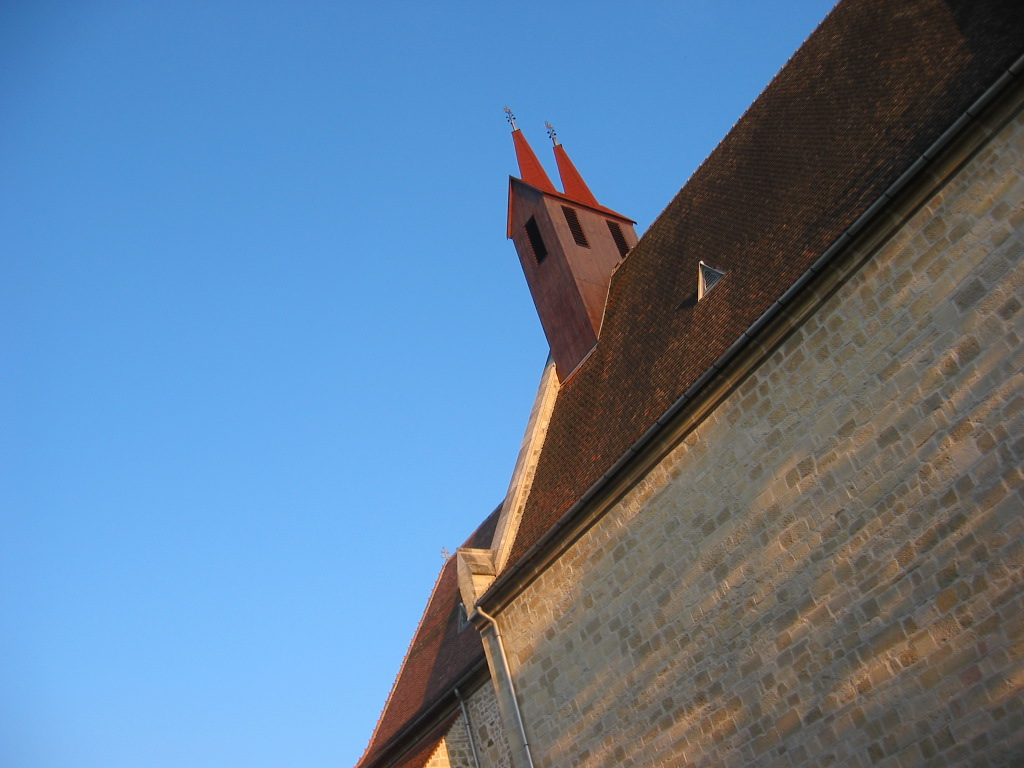
Lateral view

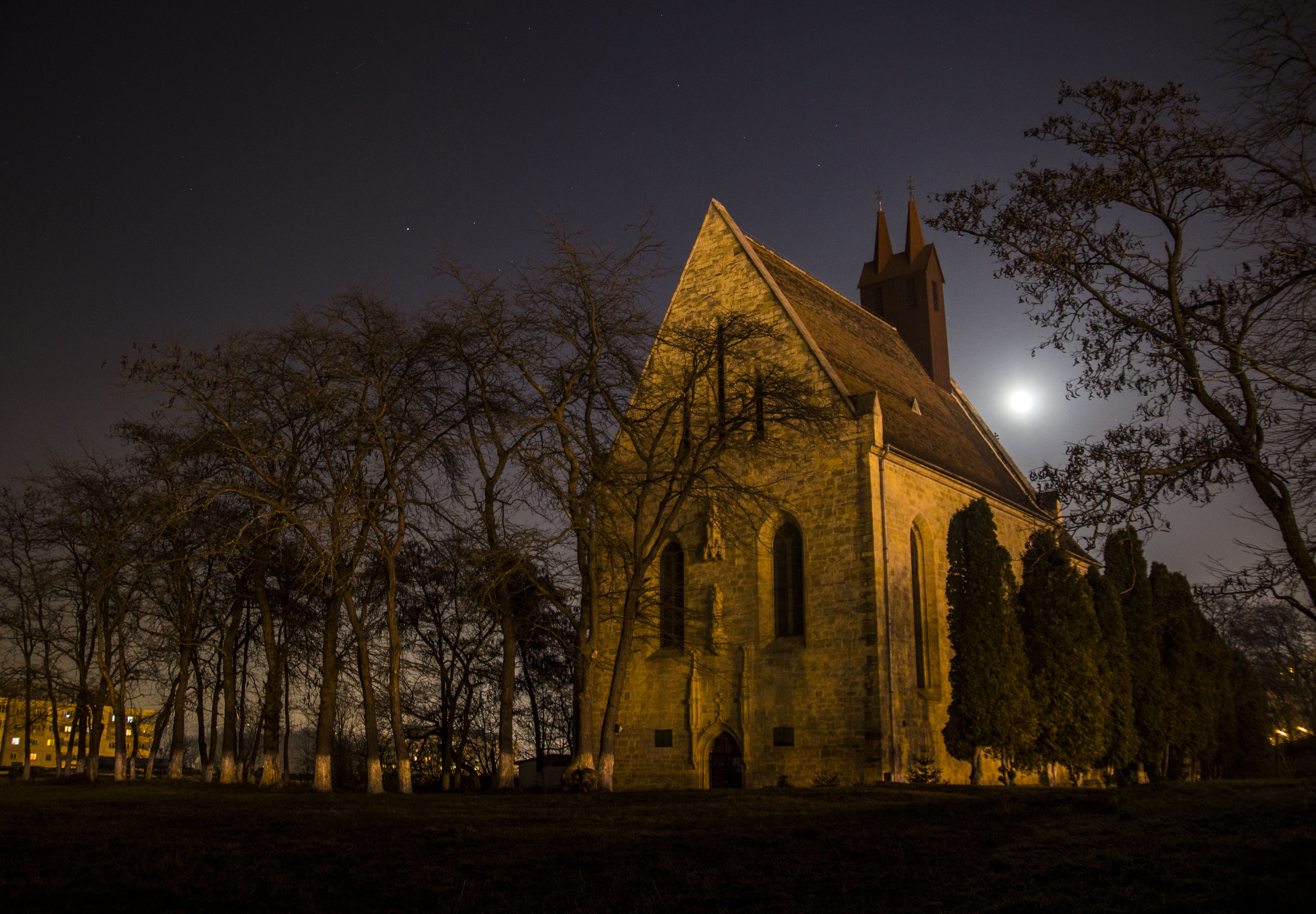
Night view
