= Cluj-Napoca Bánffy Palace =

Baroque building in Cluj-Napoca, Romania

Coordinates: 46°46′14″N 23°35′26″E

Bánffy Palace
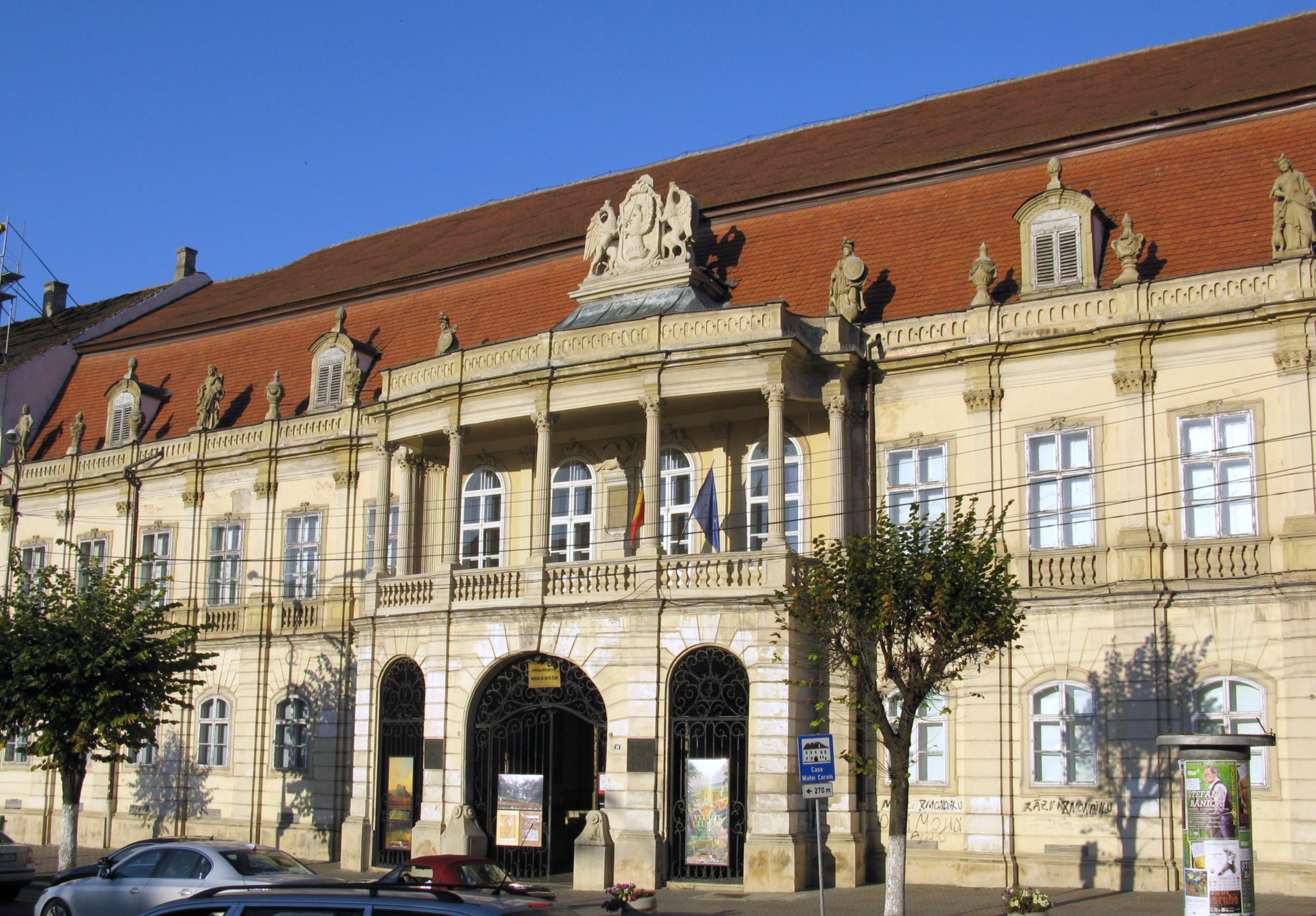
- Exterior view

General information
- Architectural style: Baroque
- Location: Cluj-Napoca, Romania
- Construction started: 1774
- Completed: 1786
- Client: György Bánffy, governor of Transylvania

Design and construction
- Architect: Johann Eberhard Blaumann

Bánffy Castle is a baroque building of the 18th century in Cluj-Napoca, designed by the German architect Johann Eberhard Blaumann. Built between 1774 and 1775 it is considered the most representative for the baroque style of Transylvania. The first owner of the palace was the Hungarian Duke György Bánffy (1746–1822), the governor of Transylvania.

Francis II, Holy Roman Emperor and his wife Caroline Augusta of Bavaria were hosted in the palace during their visit in Kolozsvár, between 18 and 27 August 1817. This was the first occasion when a ruler from the Habsburg family visited the city. Franz Joseph I of Austria was also the guest of the palace between 2–4 August 1852 and 22–24 September 1887. The palace (along with the Răscruci castle of the Bánffy family) features in the reminiscences of an English governess, Florence Tarring, who worked for one of the branches of the Bánffy family during the First World War (1914–1919).

In February 1951 the council of the city decided to empty the palace to establish an Art Museum there; the works were finished in the summer of 1954. The museum was opened in the restored palace on 30 December 1965. The cinema occupying the inner yard of the palace was demolished in 1974.

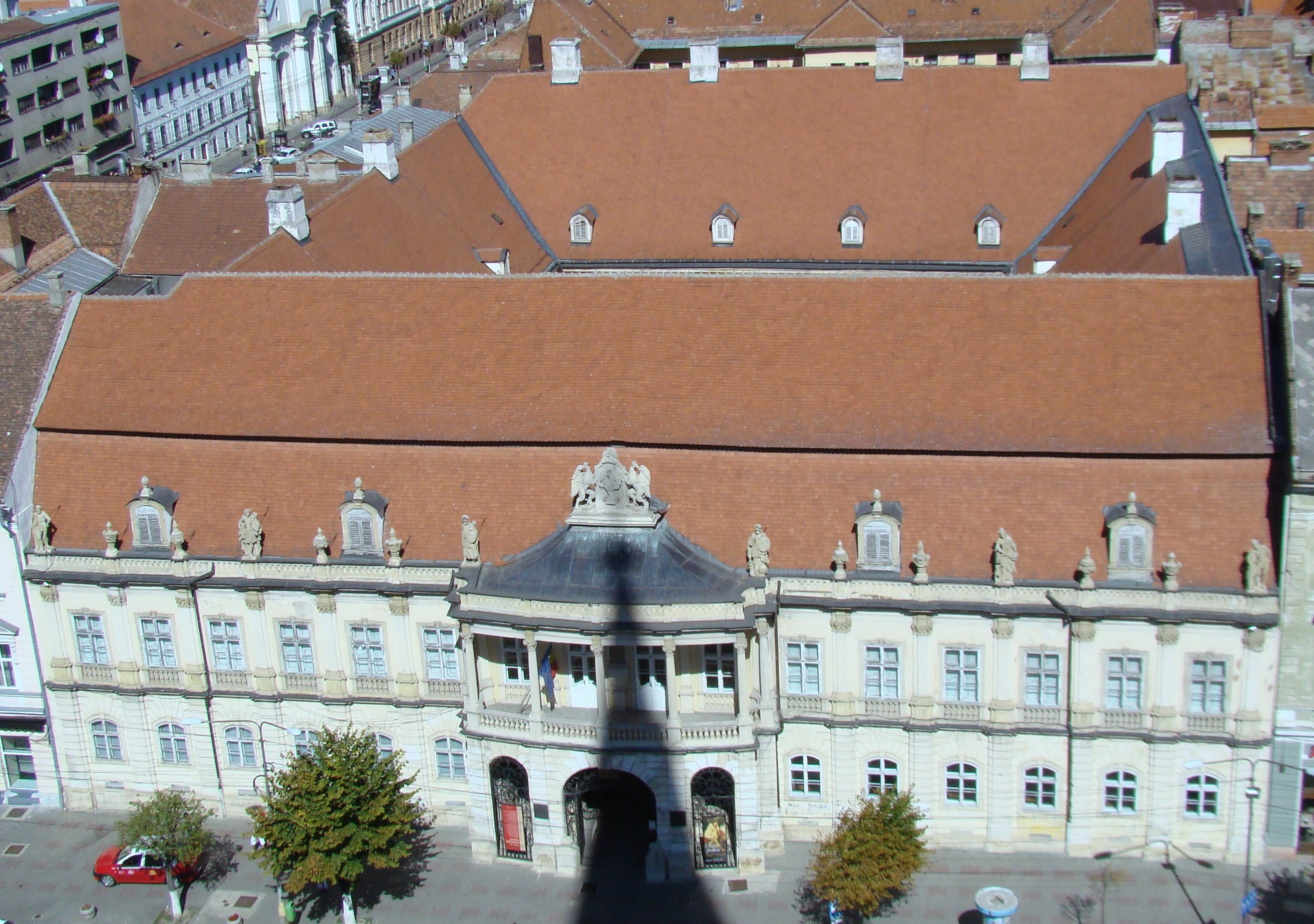
Panorama of the palace

The floor area of the palace is 66×48 m, its inner yard is 26×26 m. The wings on the sides include one row of rooms while the front and back wing include two rows. The yard is surrounded by a portico at the second-floor level.

The facade is decorated with statues of Mars, Minerva, Apollo, Diana, Hercules, Perseus, and the coat of arms of the Bánffy family with gryphons, without crown. In the median risalit there is a gate, above this is a loggia with seven pillars.

== Art museum ==
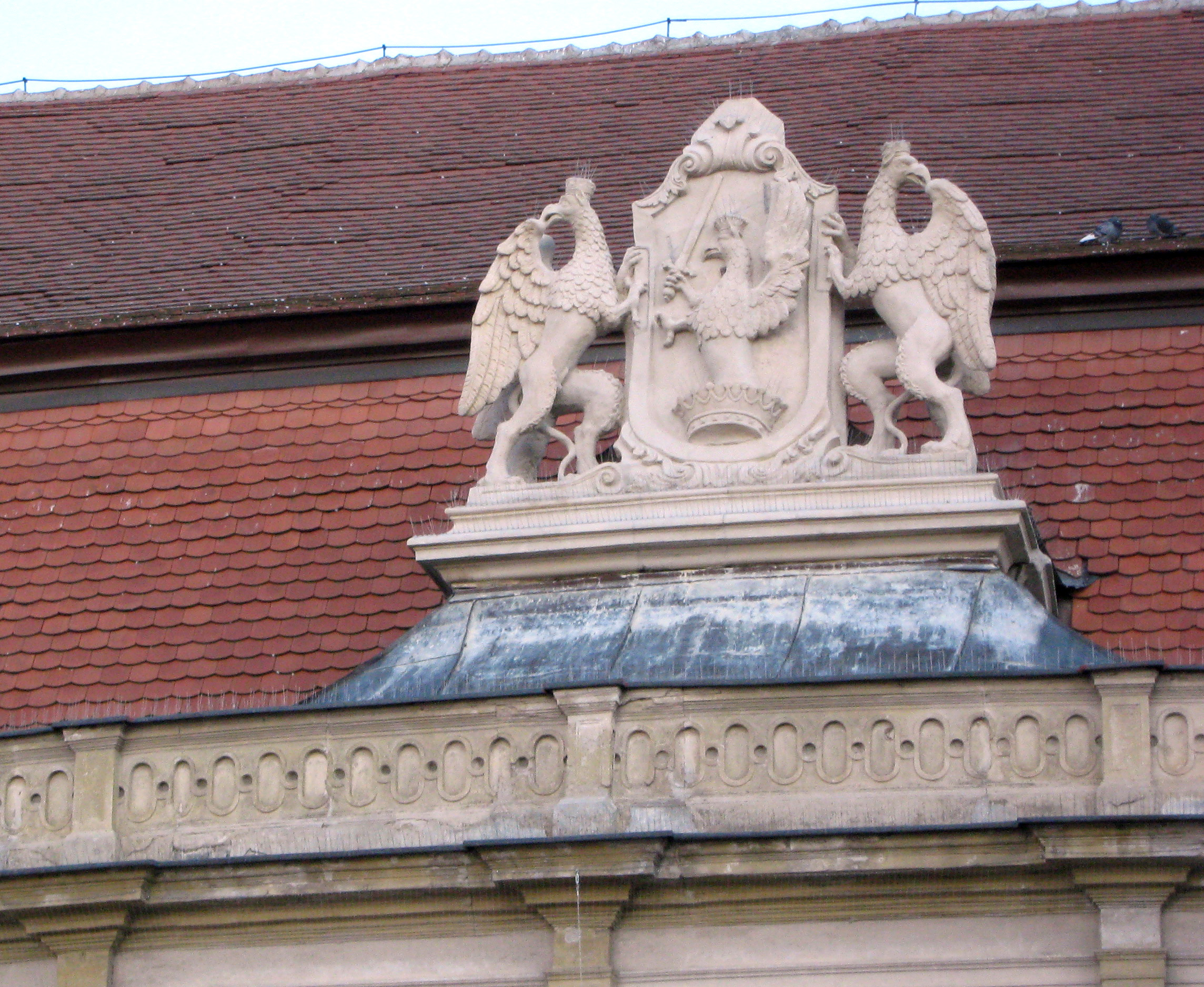
Bánffy family coat of arms

Since 1951, the palace has housed the National Museum of Art Cluj-Napoca, which includes, in its Virgil Cioflec collection the works of arts of many important Romanian artists, such as Nicolae Grigorescu, Ştefan Luchian, Dimitrie Paciurea, Theodor Pallady, Camil Ressu and others. The museum also includes works by noted Hungarian artists József Koszta, Károly Lotz, László Mednyánszky, Mihály Munkácsy, Béla Nagy Abodi and István Réti. The international collection features paintings of major European artists like Luca Giordano, Carlo Dolci, Jean-Hippolyte Flandrin, Félix Ziem, Ivan Aivazovsky, Herri met de Bles, and Franz Defregger, as well as sculptures of Claude Michel, Antoine-Louis Barye and Ernst Barlach. The graphics collection includes works of great European printmakers of the 16th–20th centuries. Among those, the museum hosts the works of Salvator Rosa, Giovanni Battista Piranesi, Honoré Daumier, Théodore Géricault, Edgar Degas and Käthe Kollwitz.

== See also ==
Museums in Cluj:

- Ethnographic Museum of Transylvania
- National Museum of Transylvanian History
- Water Museum
- Pharmacy Museum
- Babeș-Bolyai University Museums:
  - Babeş-Bolyai University Museum
  - "Emil Racoviţă" Museum of Speleology
  - Museum of Mineralogy
  - Botanical Museum
  - Museum of Paleontology and Stratigraphy
  - Zoological Museum
