= Cluj-Napoca City Hall =

Seat of government for Cluj-Napoca, Romania

Coordinates: 46.768521°N 23.584958°E

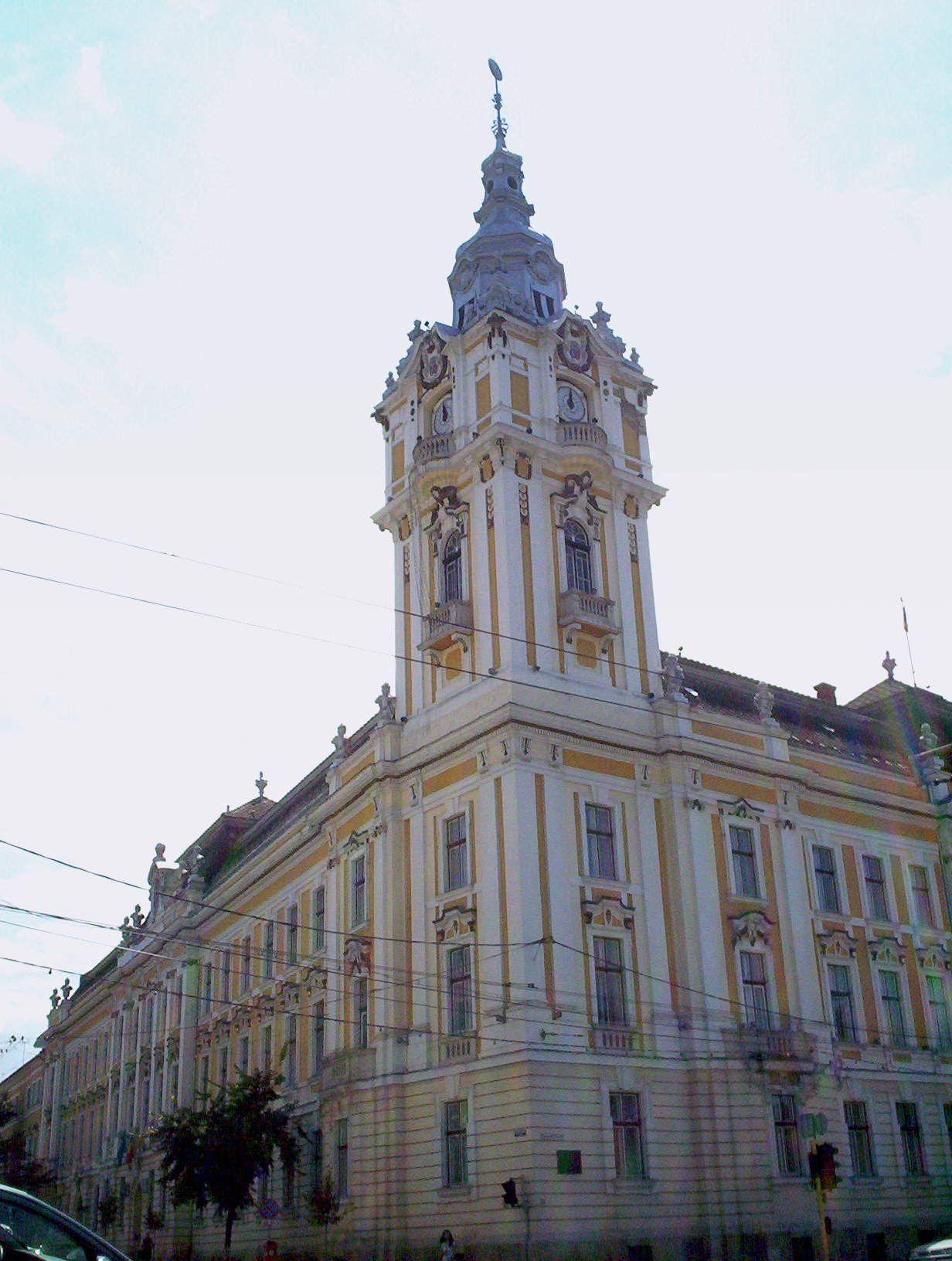
Cluj-Napoca City Hall

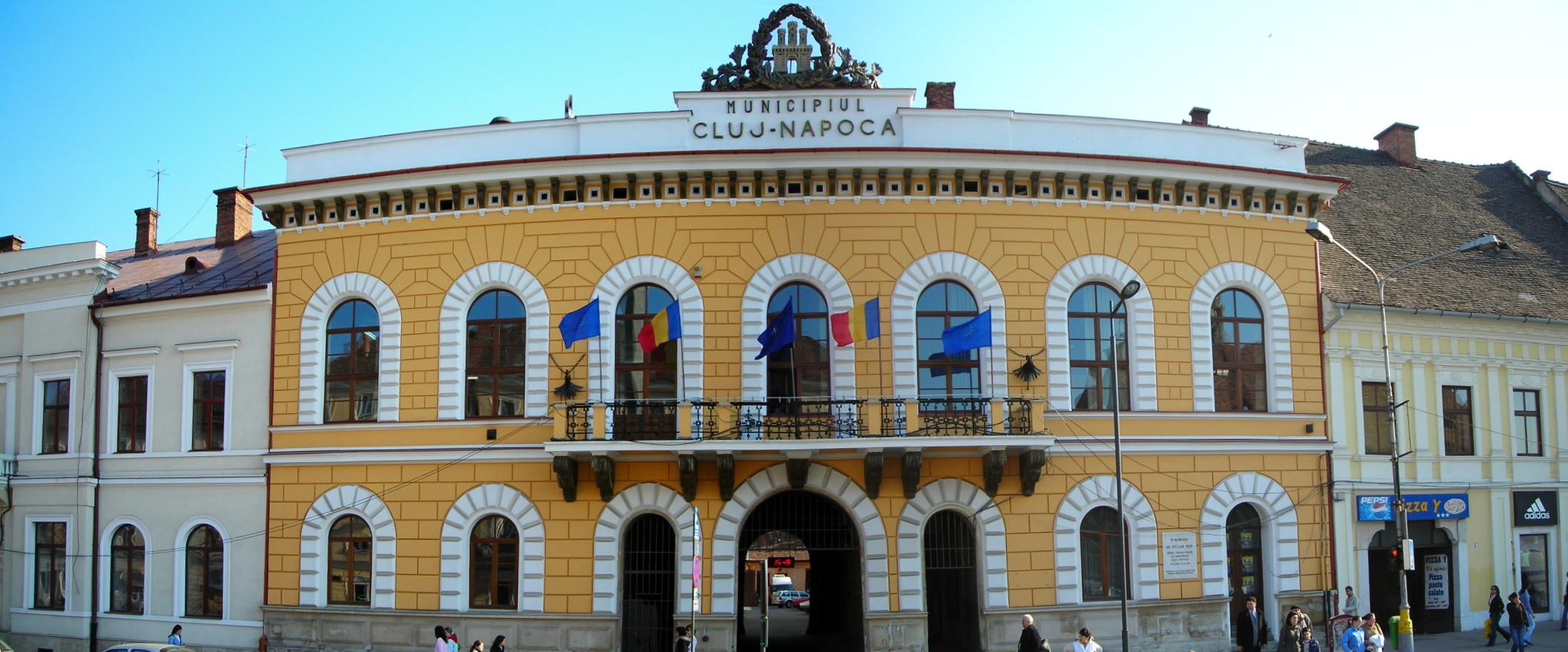
The old city hall, at 1 Unirii Square (1843-46)

The Cluj-Napoca City Hall, located at 3 Moților Street, is the seat of government for Cluj-Napoca, Romania. Built at the end of the 19th century after the plans of architect Ignác Alpár, it features a Viennese baroque facade with a corner clock tower. Affixed to the tower was the seal of Kolozs County, of which the city was the seat when it was part of Austria-Hungary before 1918, as the building initially housed the county's headquarters. The building was erected according to the city's 1798 development plan, whereby every new building had to be approved by the city council. During its days as county headquarters, the building served multiple purposes–as a political, administrative and fiscal centre. At the same time, the large halls hosted exhibitions of both established and younger artists, and, starting at the turn of the 20th century, the city's balls.

The building is classified as a historic monument by the Ministry of Culture and National Patrimony.
