= National Museum of Transylvanian History =

Museum in Cluj-Napoca, Romania

Coordinates: 46.771468°N 23.586384°E

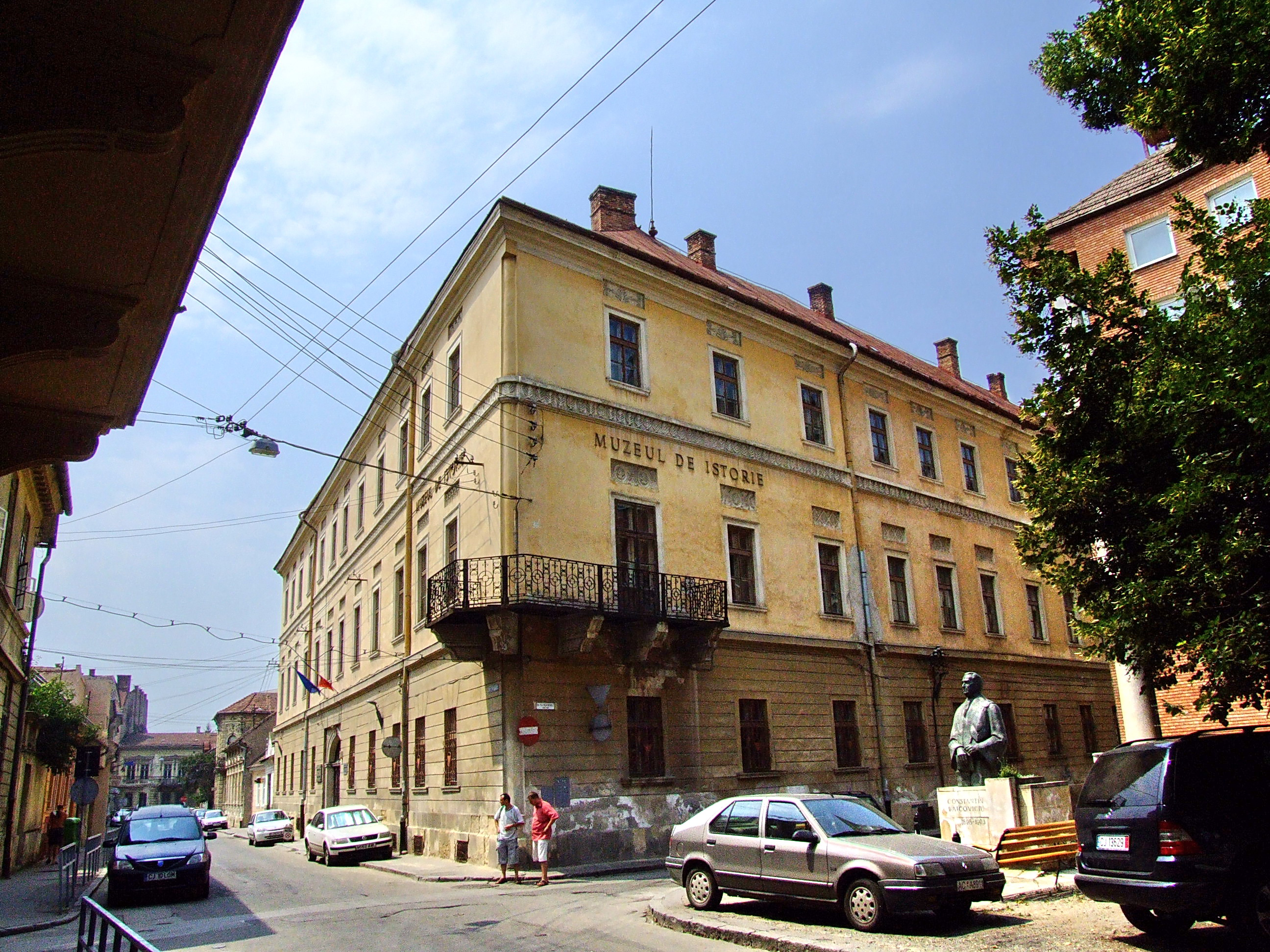
National Museum of Transylvanian History

The National Museum of Transylvanian History (Romanian: Muzeul Național de Istorie a Transilvaniei, Hungarian: Erdélyi Történelmi Múzeum) is a history and archaeology museum in the city of Cluj-Napoca, Romania. It features a permanent exhibition, as well as temporary exhibitions, the "Tezaur" exhibition, and Pharmacy Historical collection—this last opened in the Hintz House, an historical building in the city's center.

The beginnings of the museum date back to 1859 with the foundation of the Society of the Transylvanian Museum, featuring collections of antiquities and botanical, zoological and mineralogical specimens. In 1929 the collection of artefacts was transferred to the Romanian Institute of Classical Studies. After several further movements, caused by lack of space, the collection was reopened in 1937 at its current site in Piaţa Muzeului (Constantin Daicoviciu street), in the center of Cluj-Napoca.

== Permanent collection ==
The permanent collection is organized in chronological order.

=== Prehistory ===
The longest period in the history of mankind, developing from times when the writing was still unknown. Chronologically it stretches from Paleolithic, Neolithic, Bronze Age to Iron Age. The National Museum of Transylvanian History offers a vast collection of Iclod culture, Petrești culture, Wietenberg culture and Noua culture. It hosts the biggest hoard bronze artifacts in Europe.

==== Wietenberg Culture Artifacts ====
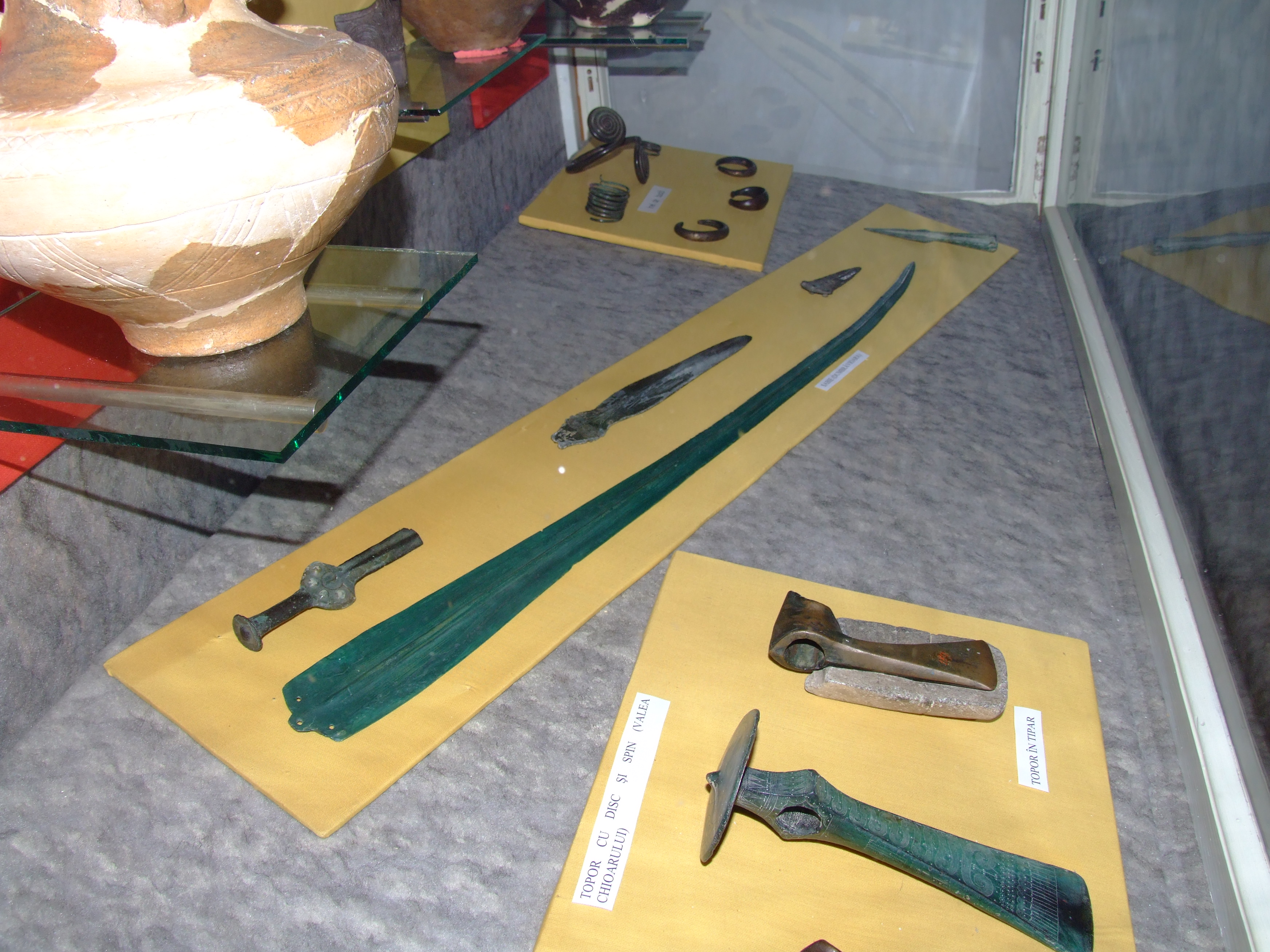
Wietenberg culture axe decorated in the same style as the pottery

=== Dacian Ages in Transylvania ===
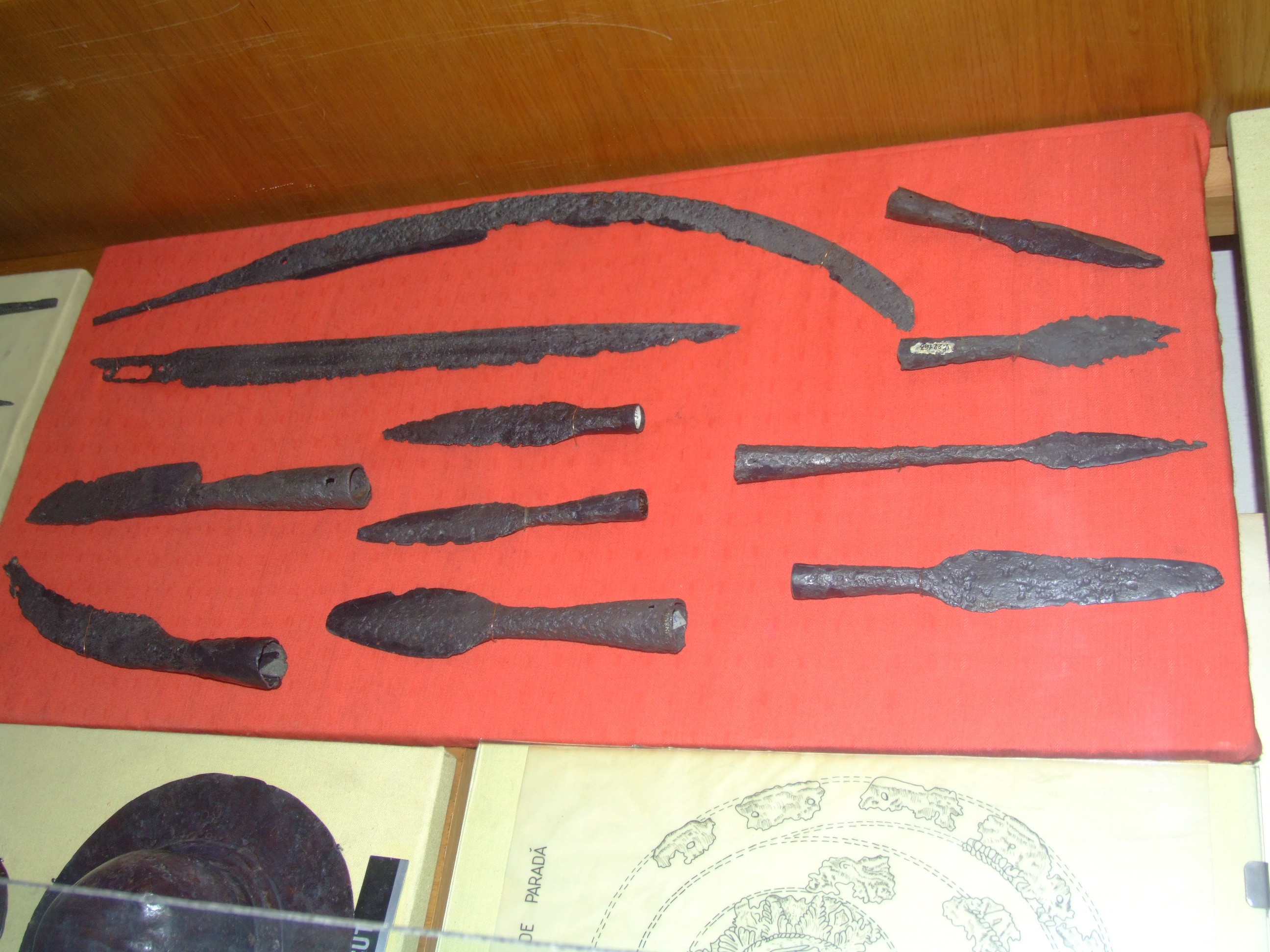

The Dacian collection present a rich collection of artifacts, including weaponry.

== See also ==
- Museums in Cluj-Napoca
- Prehistory of Transylvania
