= Ethnographic Museum of Transylvania =

Museum in Cluj-Napoca, Romania

Coordinates: 46.7692686°N 23.5865425°E

The Ethnographic Museum of Transylvania (Romanian: Muzeul Etnografic al Transilvaniei; Hungarian: Erdélyi néprajzi múzeum) is situated in Cluj-Napoca, Romania. With a history of almost 100 years, the Ethnographic Museum of Transylvania is one of the first and greatest of its kind in Romania. It has two exhibition sections, one of which is to be found in downtown Reduta Palace (21, Memorandumului Street), while the other exhibition section is the open-air Romulus Vuia Park situated on the city's north-west side, in Hoia Forest.

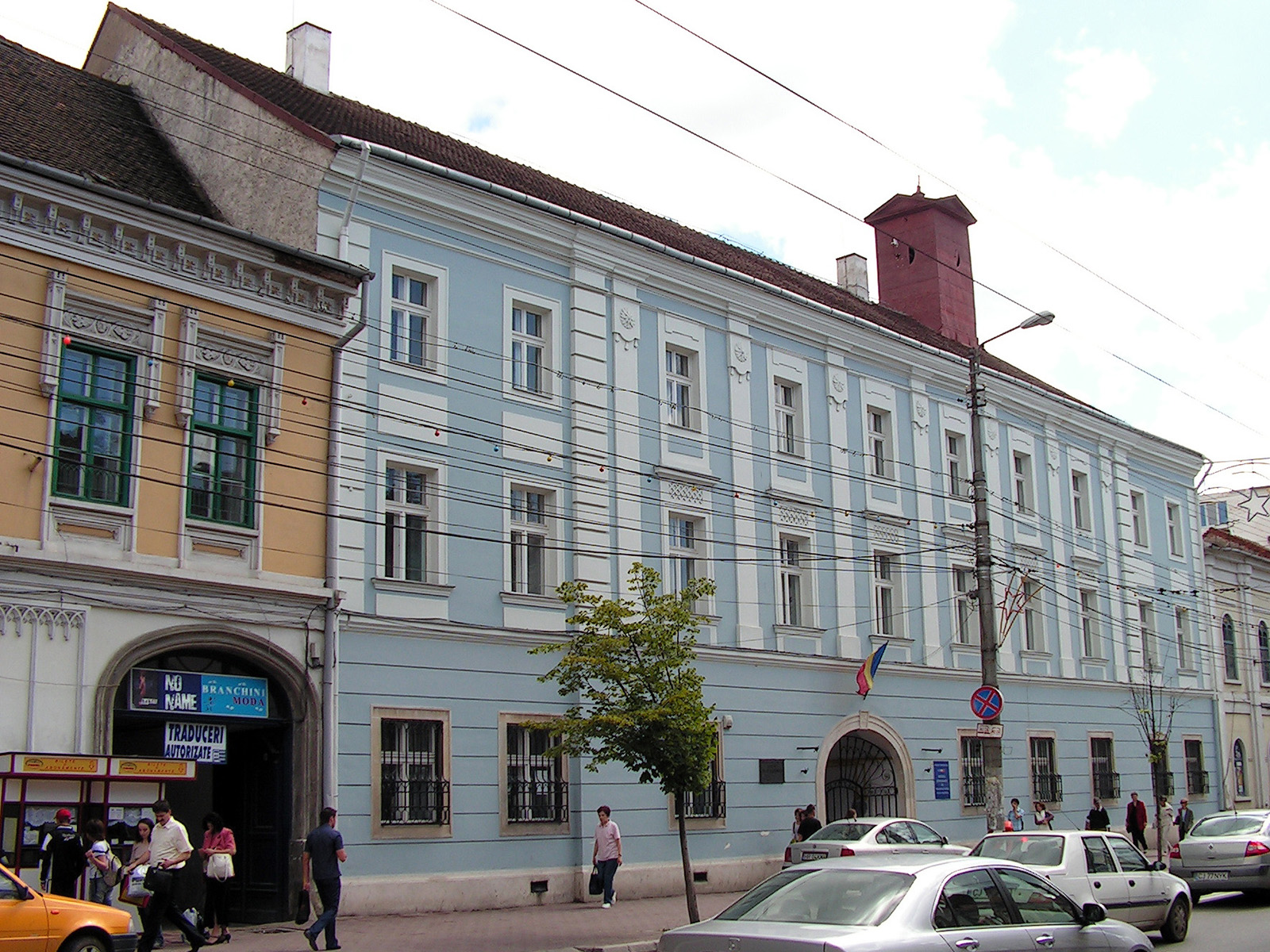
Reduta Palace.

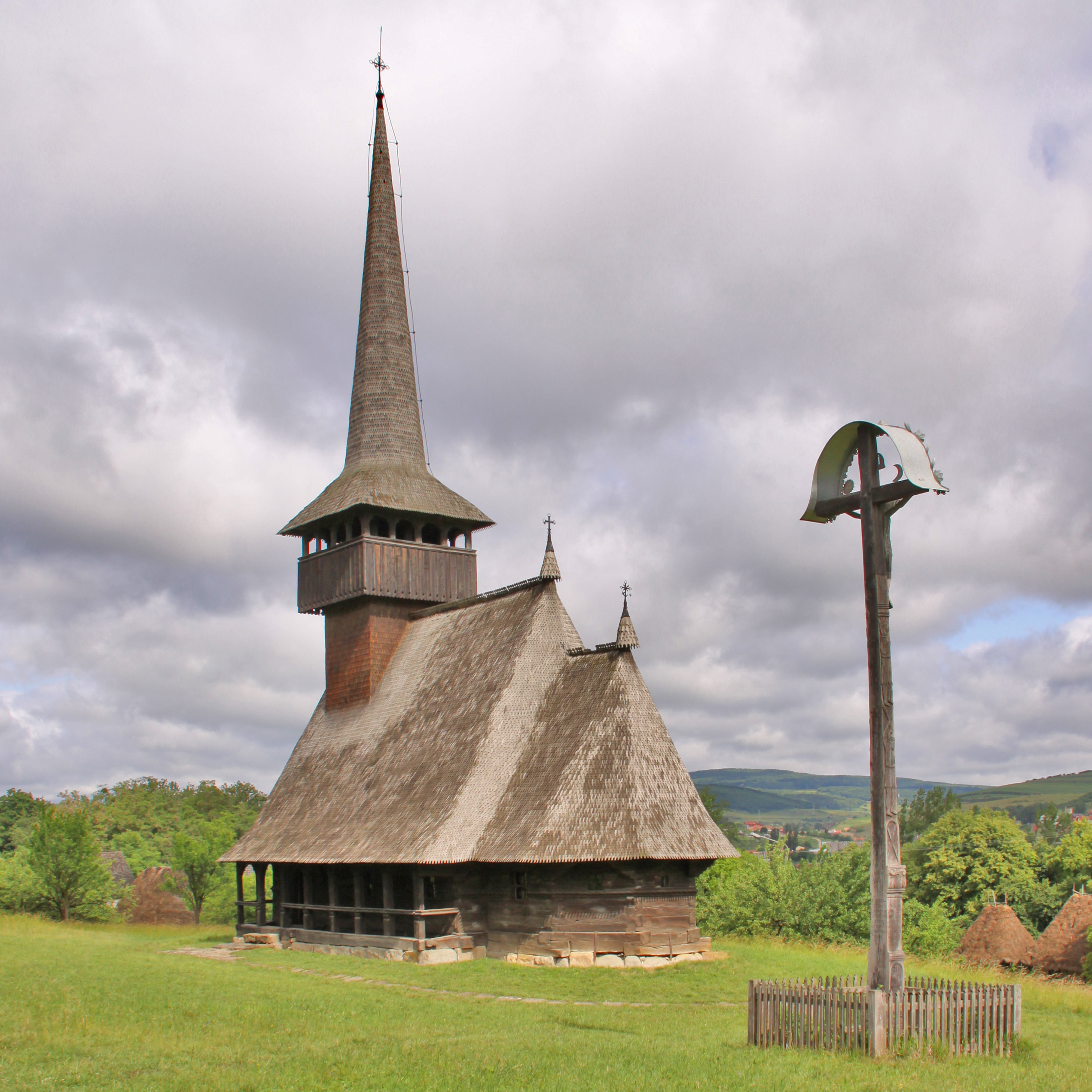
Cizer church in Romulus Vuia Park.

== History ==
The museum was founded on 16 June 1922.

== Collection ==
The museum has a collection of more than 50,000 objects reflecting the occupations, the habits and the life style of the Transylvanian rural population. Part of this collection is to be found in the Reduta Palace while the rest of the objects are in the open-air section.

=== Reduta Palace ===
The collection here presented is a representative selection of the items and clothes used in rural everyday life. Besides, Reduta Palace also houses a collection of some 50,000 photographs and some 5,000 diapositives. The library of the museum has some 12,000 scholarly journals and specialized magazines.

=== The Ethnographic Park "Romulus Vuia" ===
The Ethnographic Park "Romulus Vuia" is the open-air section of the museum. It opened to the public on 12 April 1929, as the first open-air museum in Romania.

The most ancient objects here exhibited date from 1678. The park's main collection is composed of:

- 13 traditional farms with some 90 buildings collected from several transylvanian ethnographical regions: Ţara Moţilor, Ţara Năsăudului, Bistriţa, Câmpia Transilvaniei, Maramureş, Székely Land, Ţara Zarandului, Podgoria Albă, Oaş Country, Gurghiu, Ţara Călatei, Bran
- 34 rural technical installations
- 5 workshops
- 3 wooden churches
- a wooden carved cemetery gate.

== Gallery ==
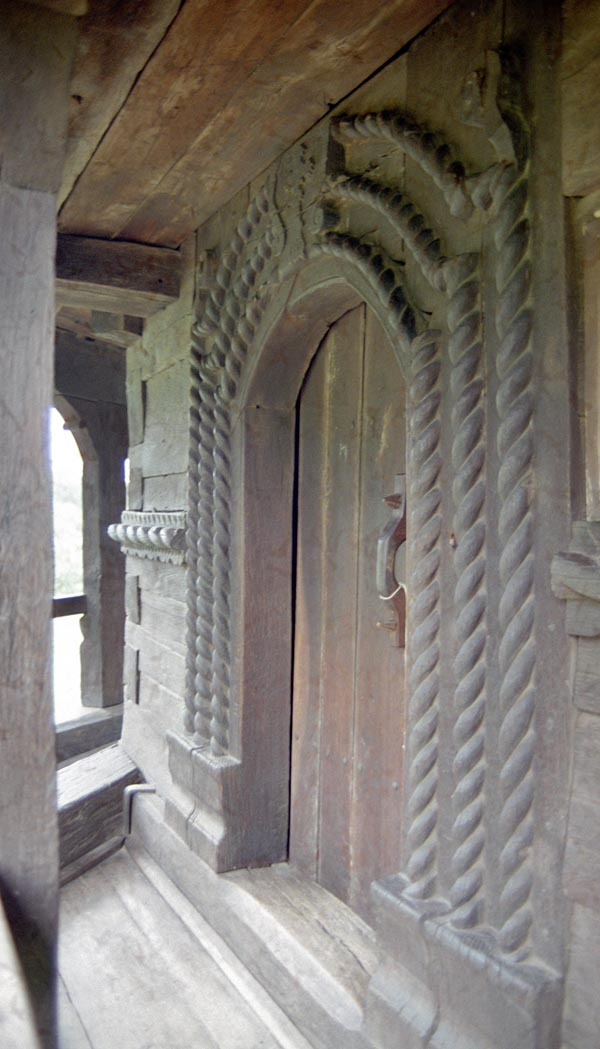
Door of Cizer church

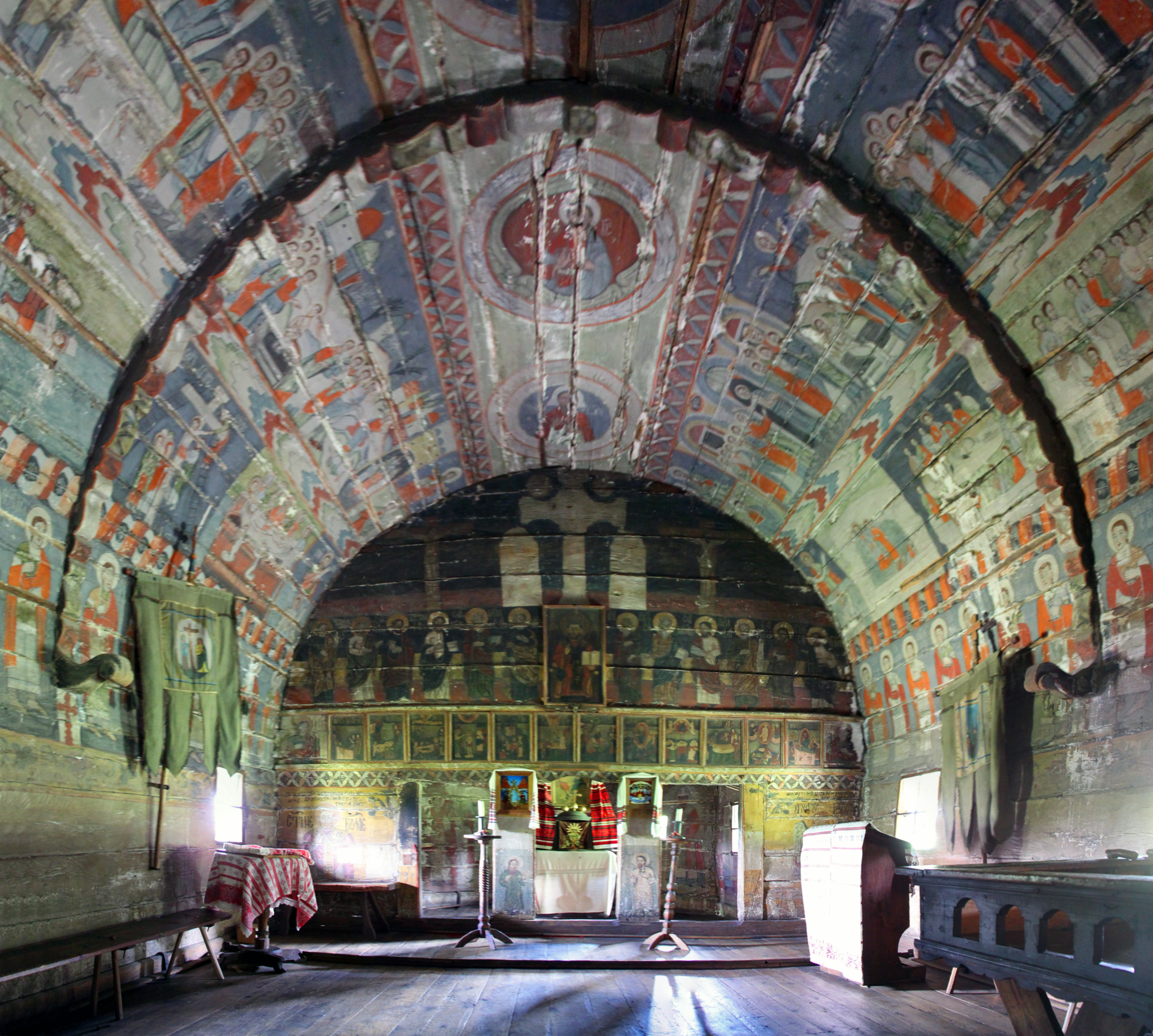
Interior of Cizer church

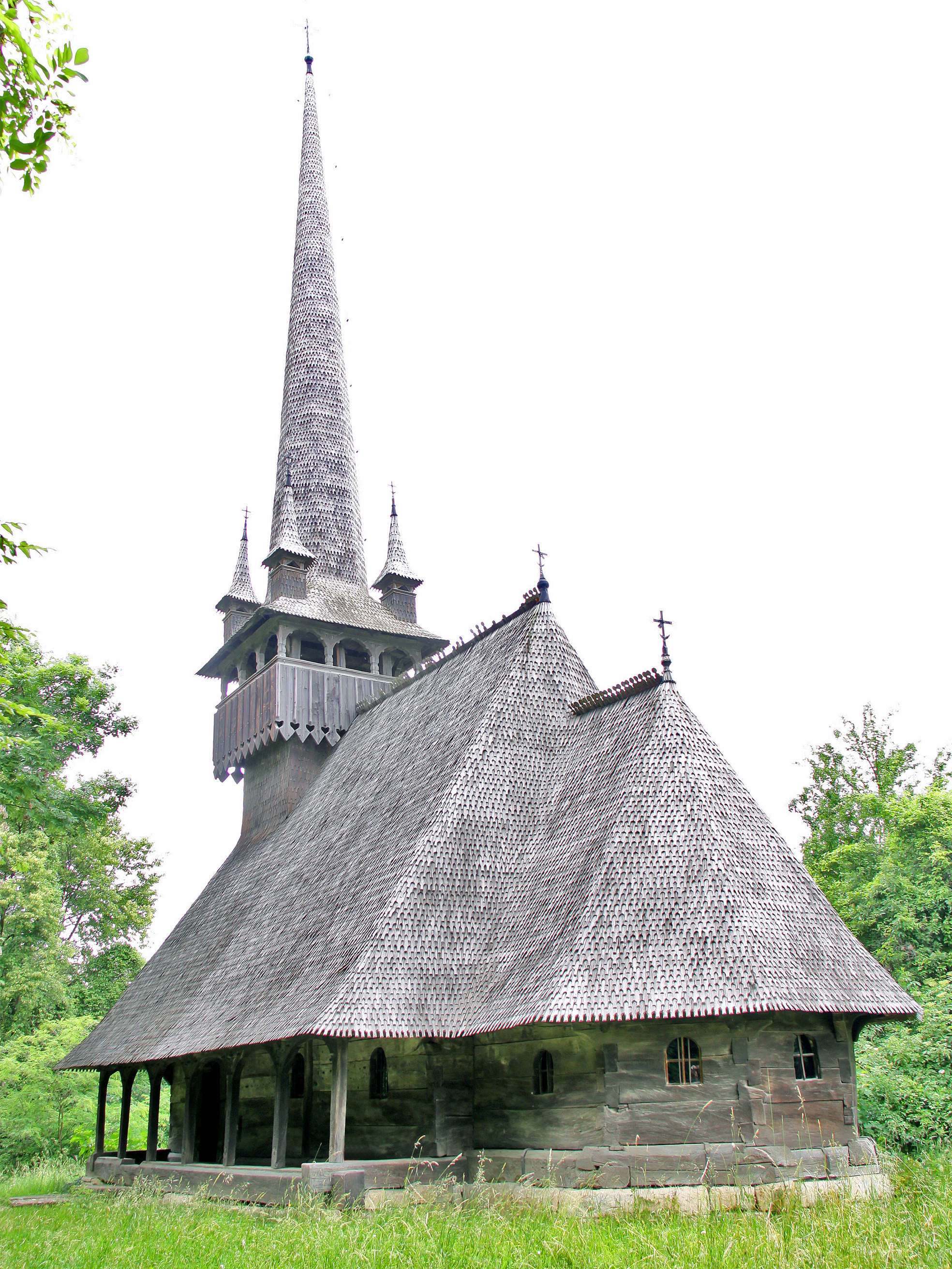
Petrindu church in Romulus Vuia park

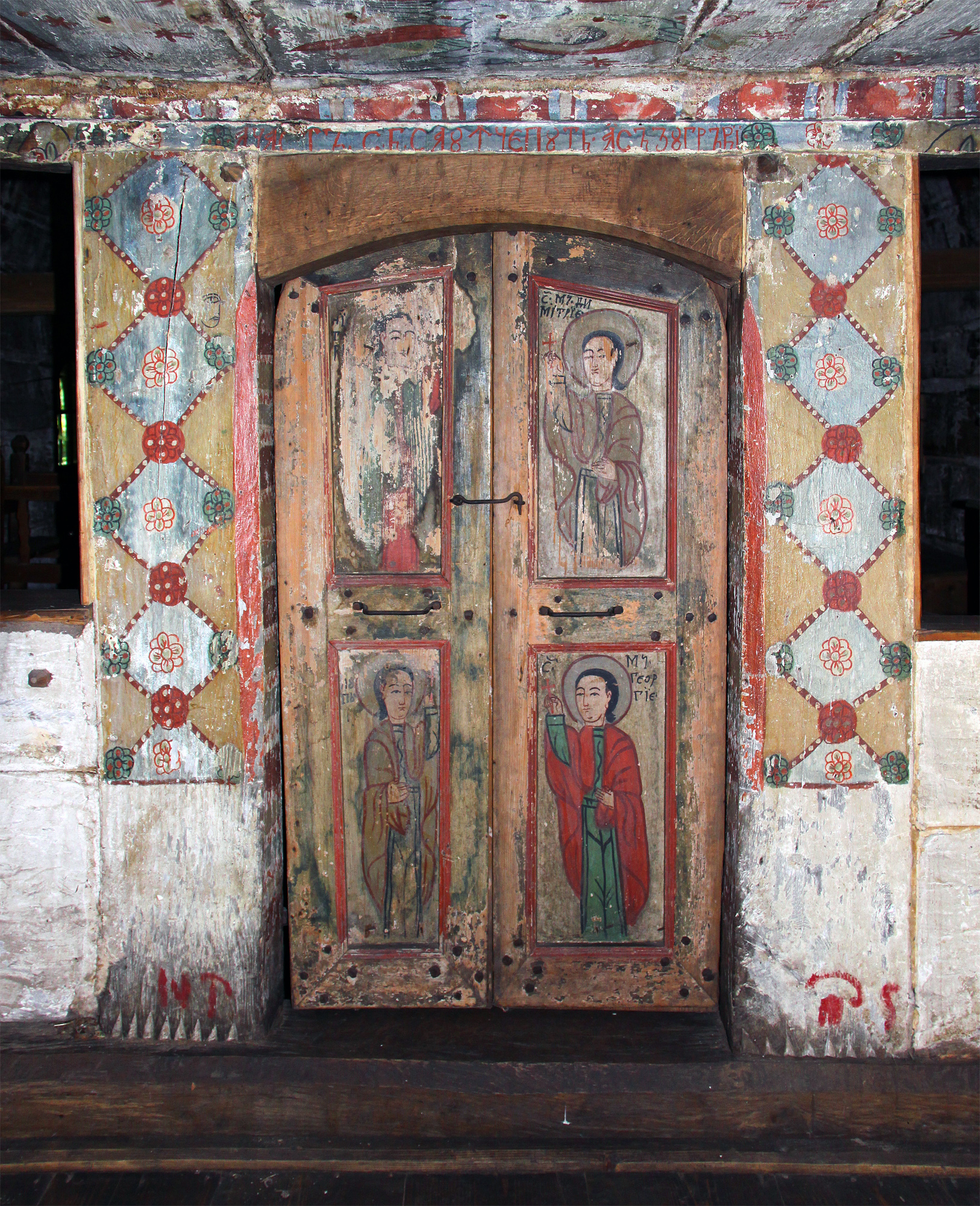
Interior door of Petrindu church

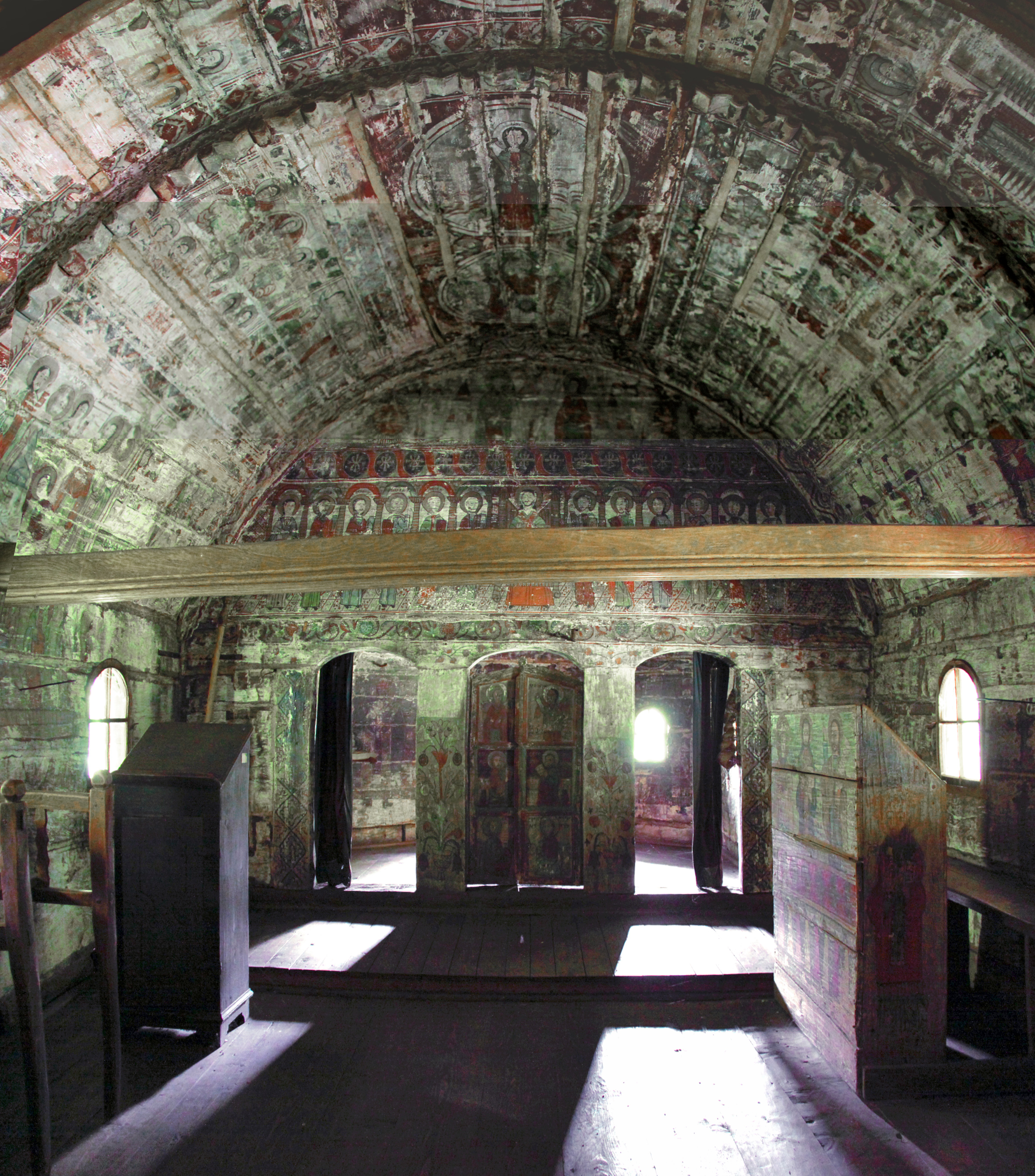
Interior of Petrindu church

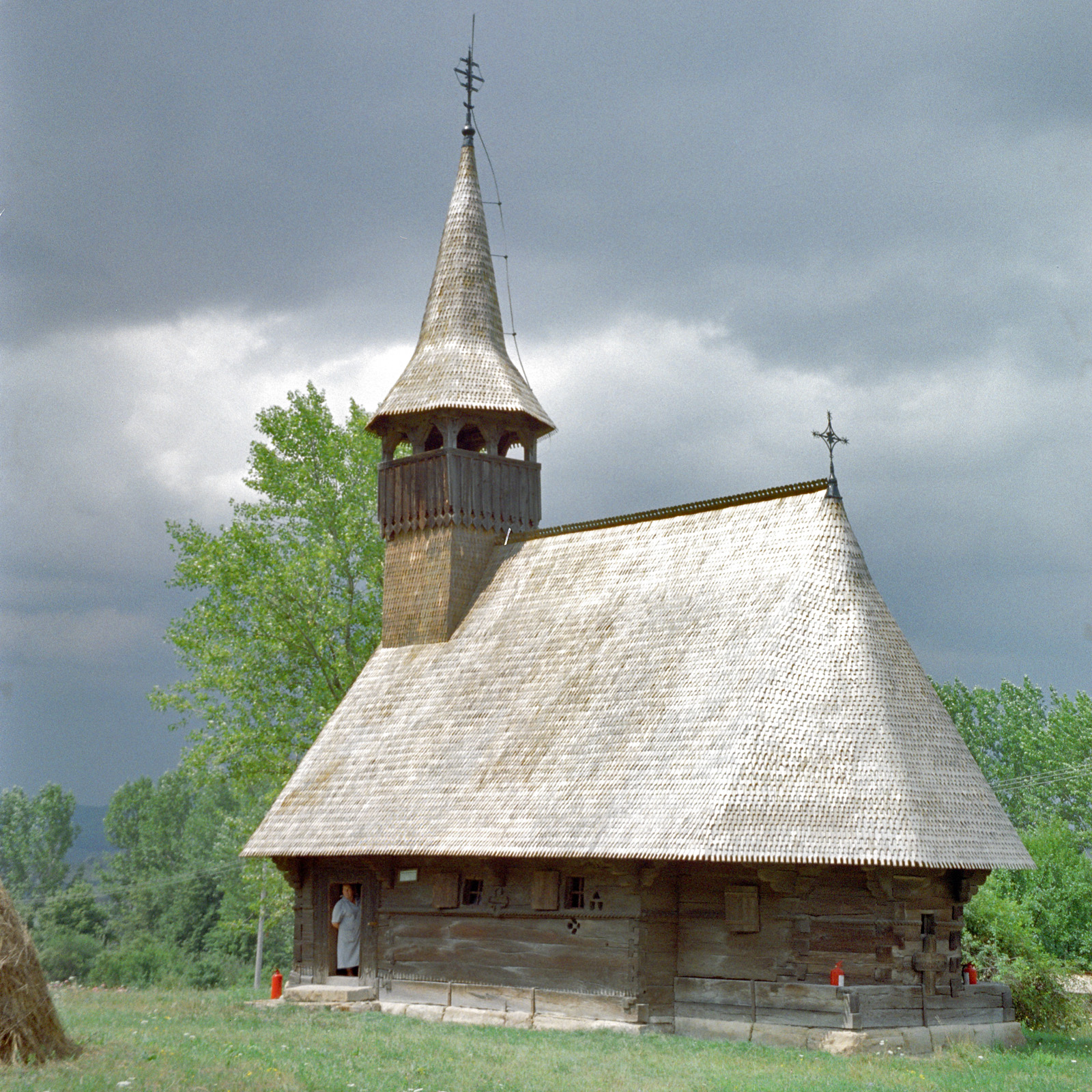
Chiraleş church in Romulus Vuia park

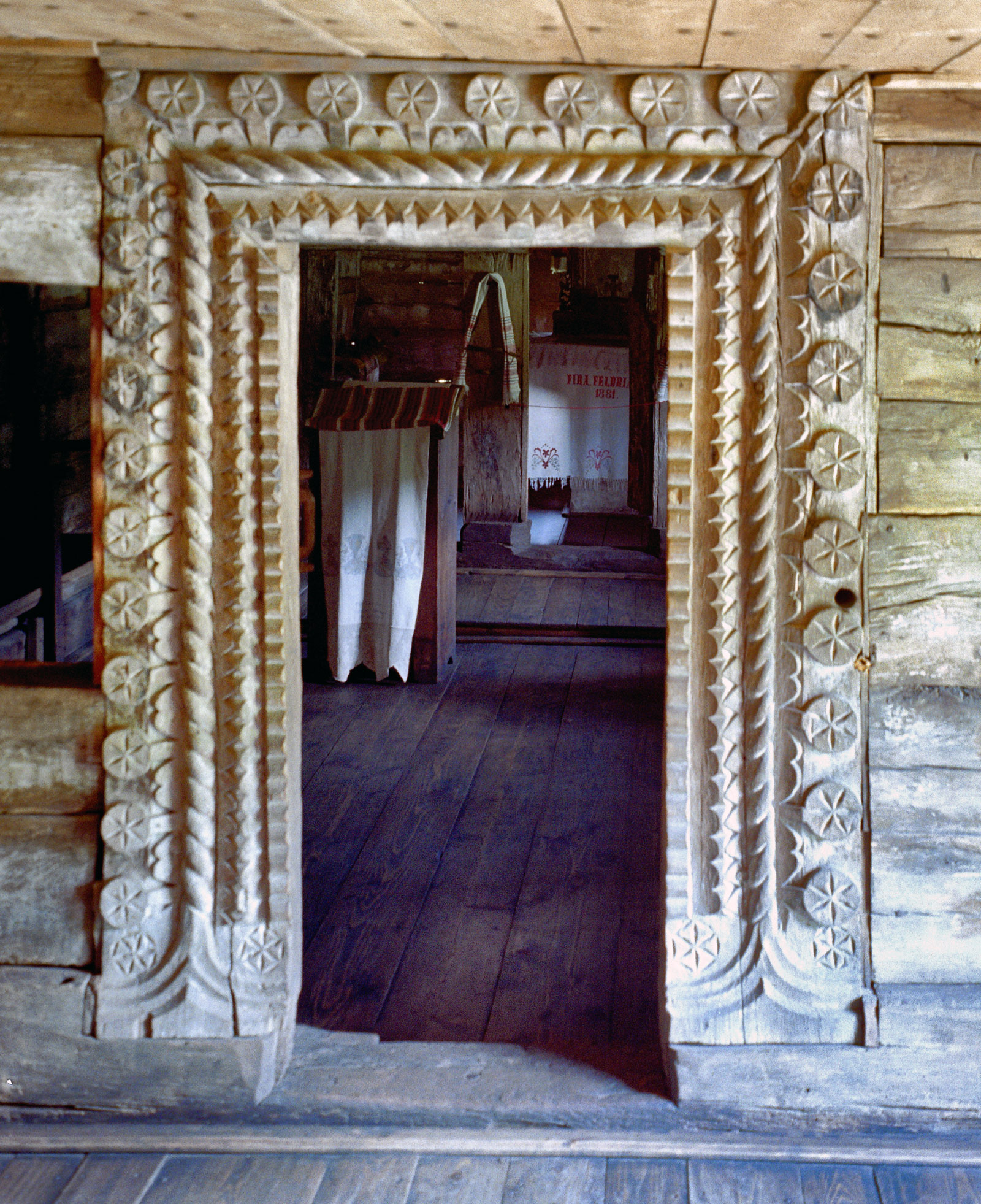
Interior door of Chiraleş church

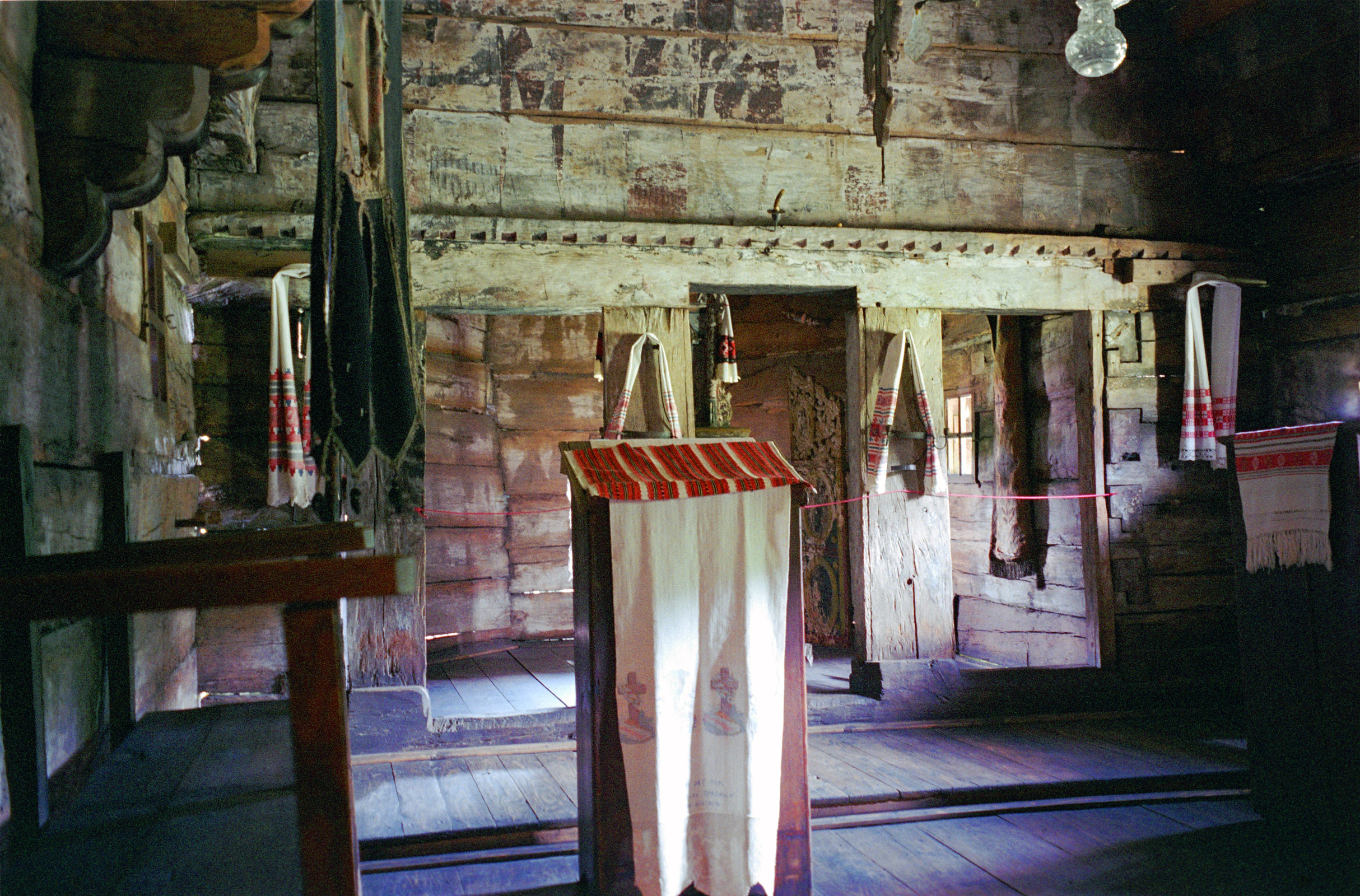
Interior of Chiraleş church

== See also ==
Museums in Cluj:

- Cluj-Napoca Art Museum
- National Museum of Transylvanian History
- Water Museum
- Pharmacy Museum
- Babeș-Bolyai University Museums:
  - Babeș-Bolyai University Museum
  - "Emil Racoviţă" Museum of Speleology
  - Museum of Mineralogy
  - Botanical Museum
  - Museum of Paleontology and Stratigraphy
  - Zoological Museum

== Bibliography ==
- Bodea Gheorghe. Clujul vechi și nou. Cluj-Napoca, 2002
- Lukács József. Povestea oraşului-comoară. Scurtă istorie a Clujului şi monumentelor sale Cluj-Napoca : Apostrof, 2005.
