= Cluj-Napoca Hintz House =

Historic building in Cluj-Napoca, Romania

Coordinates: 46.771046°N 23.589810°E

Hintz House
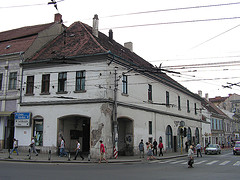
- Interactive map of the Hintz House area

General information
- Architectural style: Gothic
- Location: Cluj-Napoca, Romania

The Mauksch–Hintz House is a historic building on the Main Square of Cluj-Napoca, Romania, which houses the first pharmacy in the city.

The classicist façade dates back to the 1820s; the ground-floor and the basement however were built in the Renaissance era. A fresco from 1752 in the former office tells about the history of the pharmacy in the Hungarian language.

Cluj's first pharmacy was opened in the building in the house on the Main Square (today Piaţa Unirii) in 1573 and was operated by the government. In 1727 it was sold to its first private owner, Alexander Schwartz, than to Tobias Mauksch in 1752. In 1851 it was inherited by the (Transylvanian Saxon) Hintz family and was renamed "Saint George's Pharmacy" (La Sfântul Gheorghe). After the establishment of Communist Romania, the whole building was nationalized, and the pharmacy was closed. The descendants of the once wealthy Hintz family migrated to West Germany in the 1970s.

Today the building houses the city's Pharmaceutical Museum. The collection of the history of pharmacy was developed by Professor Gyula Orient in the last century and is on exhibit in four ground rooms and in the basement. The initial use of the different rooms of the ancient shop was preserved as it was in the old times: the office, the storeroom and the laboratory. The original features from the second half of the 18th century pharmacy are emphasized in the ceiling of the office, which preserves the original frescos with pharmaceutical symbols.

In the exhibition cases of Empire furniture one can see pharmaceutical implements of wood, ceramic, faience, porcelain and glass dating from the 17th–19th centuries. The reception desk features drugs, old receipts and seals of medieval pharmacies.

The storeroom holds some of the furniture of the old drugstore with a rich collection of pharmaceutical wares of wood, collected from all over Transylvania.

From this room, a staircase leads to the basement where the laboratory was located. Numerous bronze (16th–19th centuries), marble and cast iron mortars, scales, presses and weights are to be seen.
