= Batthyány Square Market Hall, Budapest =

Batthyány Square Market Hall
- Batthyány téri vásárcsarnok
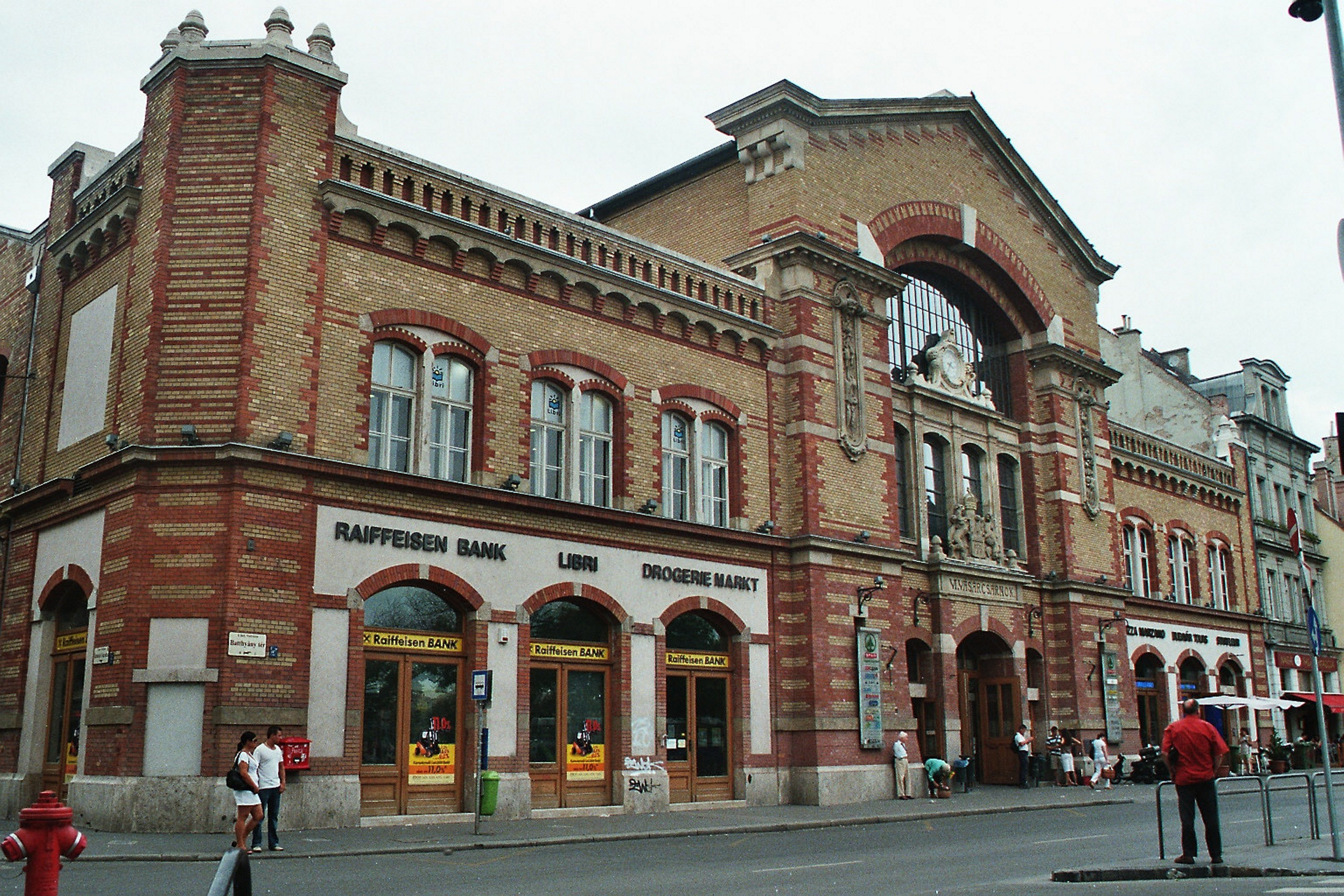
- Alternative names: Market Hall VI

General information
- Town or city: Budapest
- Country: Hungary
- Coordinates: 47.51°N 19.04°E

The Batthyány Square Market Hall or Market Hall VI (Bomba Square Market Hall until 1907) is one of the major market halls built in Budapest during the dual monarchy.

The General Assembly of the capital decided in 1894 to build customer stocks, but the hall was not built until 1900–1901, according to the plans of Pál Klunzinger. The interior, reminiscent of the Central Market Hall, can house 690 sellers at 3,156 m^{2} (33,970 sq ft). There are four transverse naves perpendicular to the main ship, which are pressed into contact with each other by a curved lower belt truss. The iron structures of the building were made by the Schlick factory. The hall was opened to the public on April 13, 1902, at a ceremony attended by József Márkus, Mayor of Budapest.

In 1936, the depopulated hall was unsuccessfully transformed into an indoor tennis court. In the 1970s, the gallery of the building housed a large flower market in Budapest. The market hall was renovated in 2003.

== Gallery ==
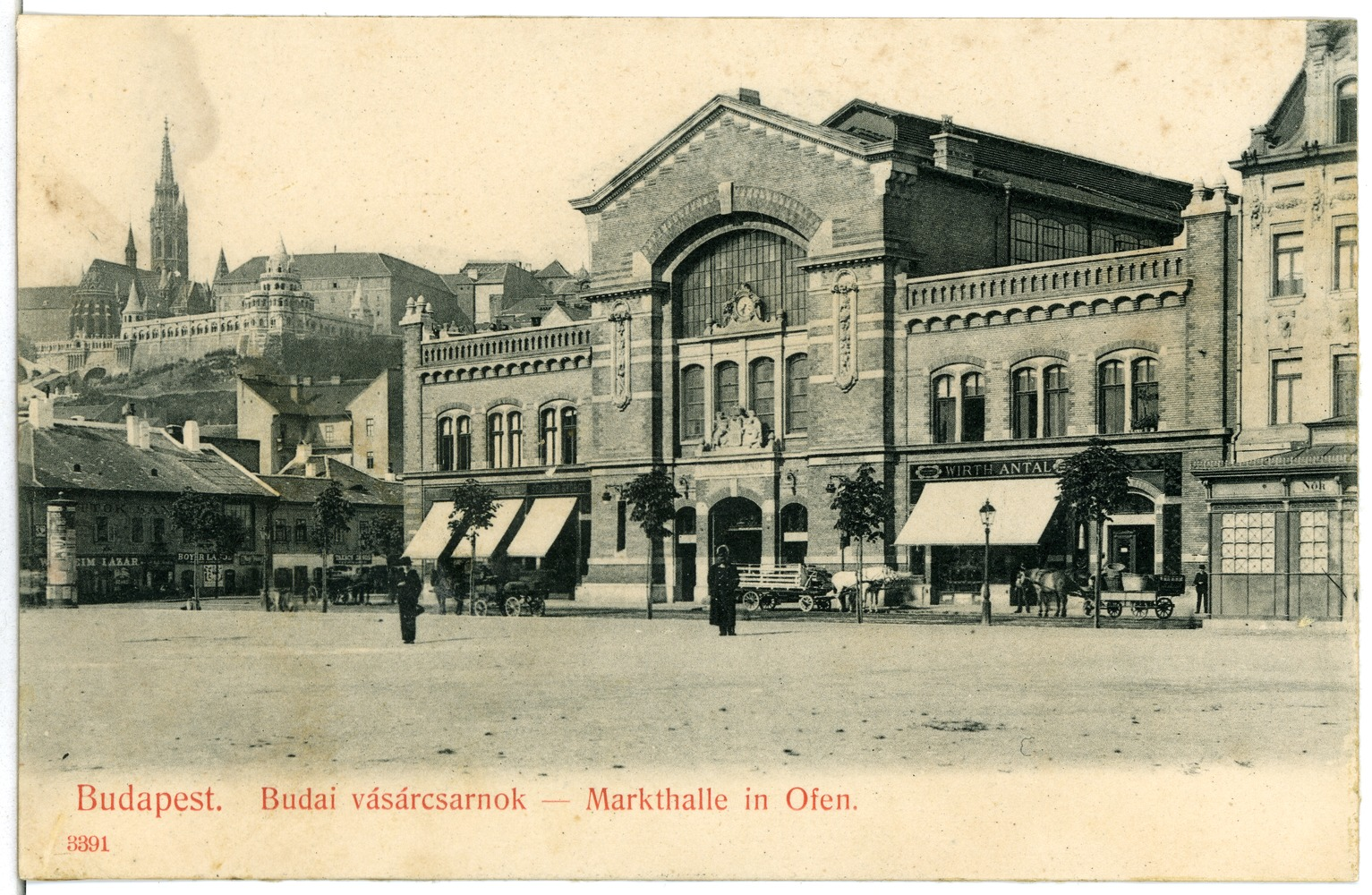

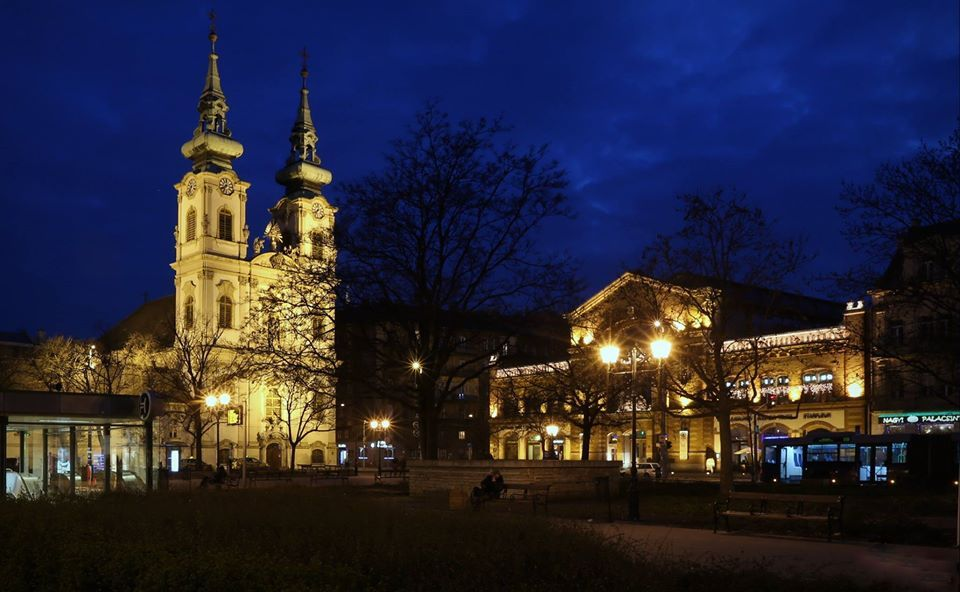

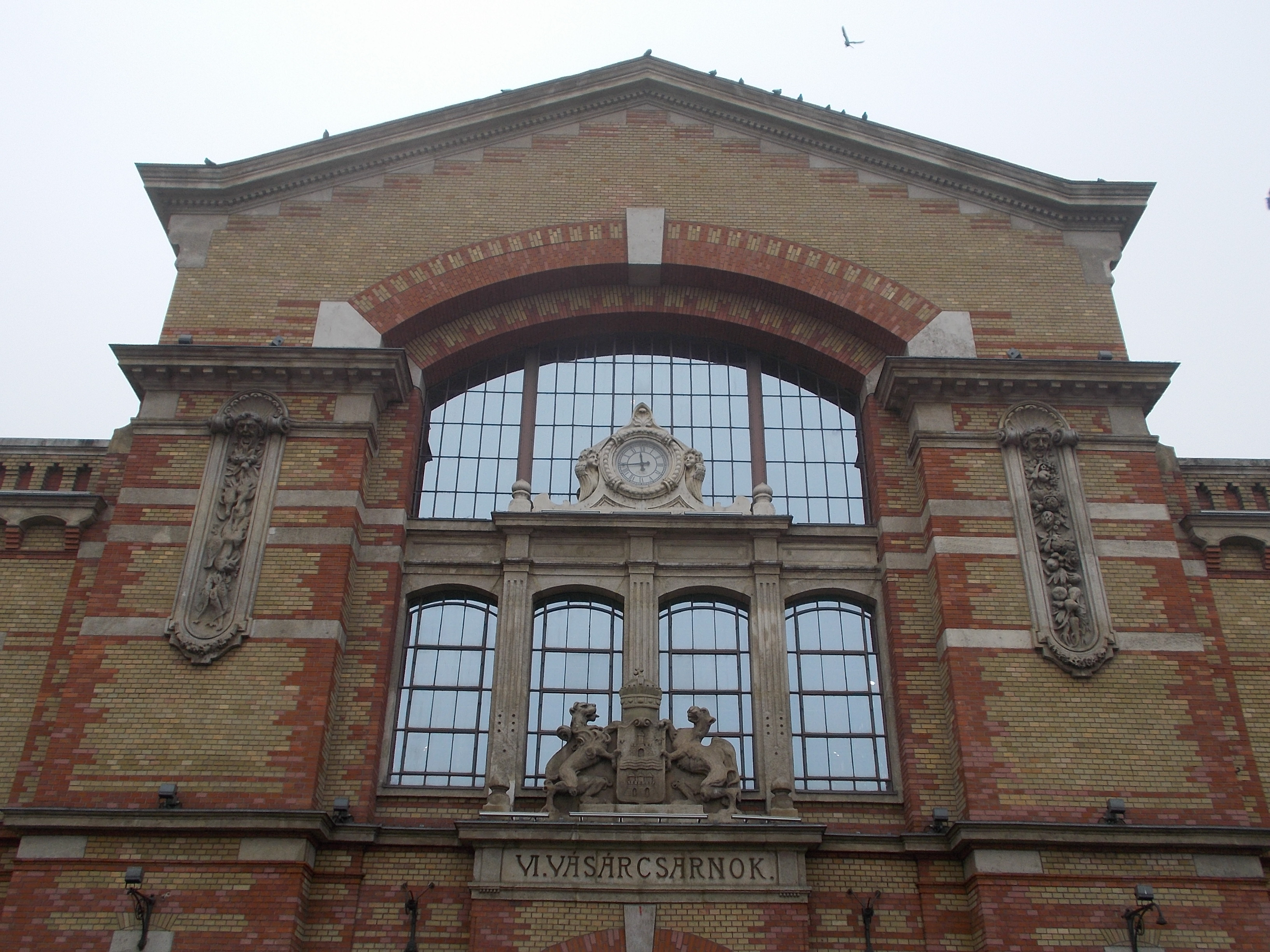

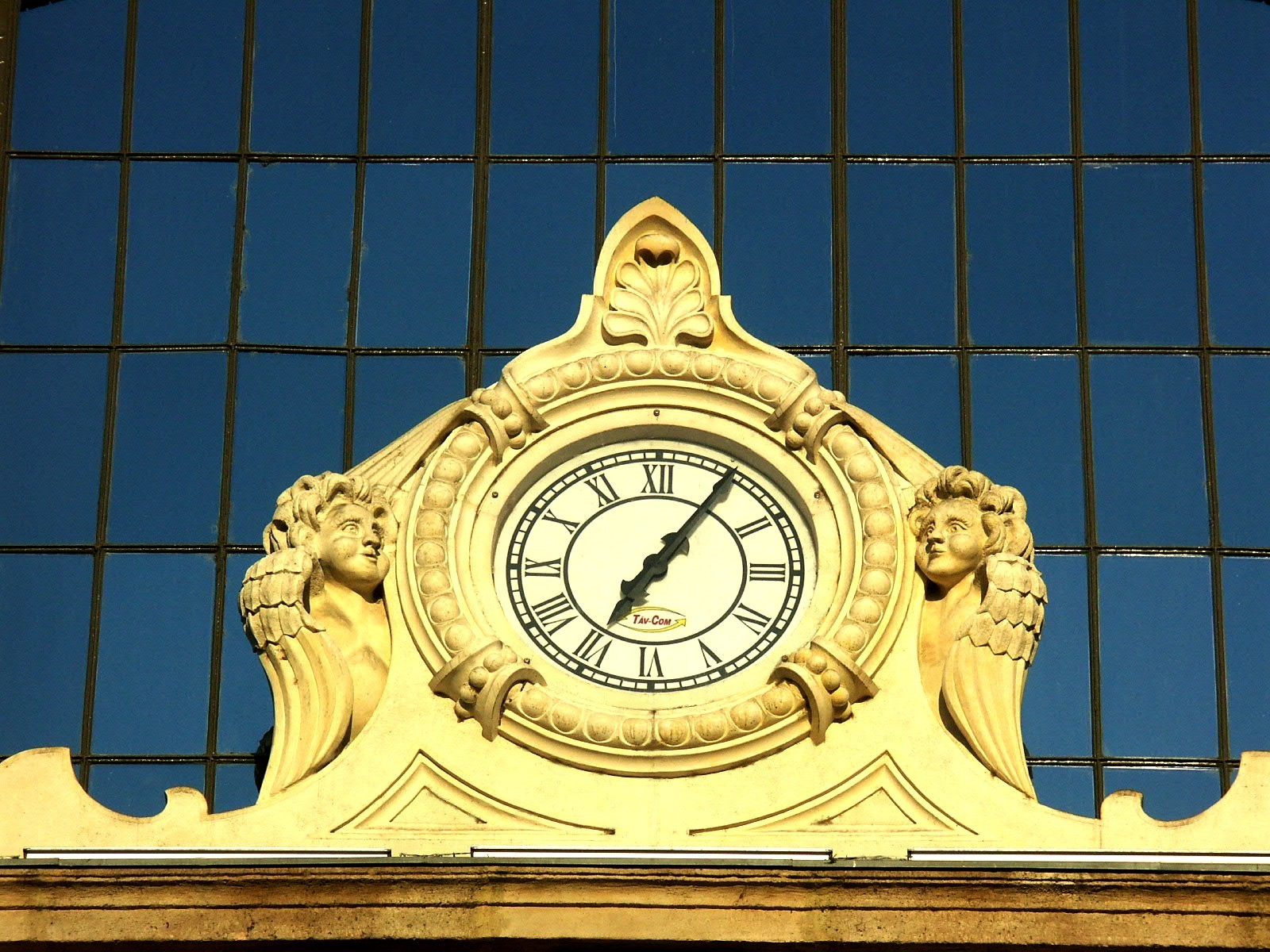

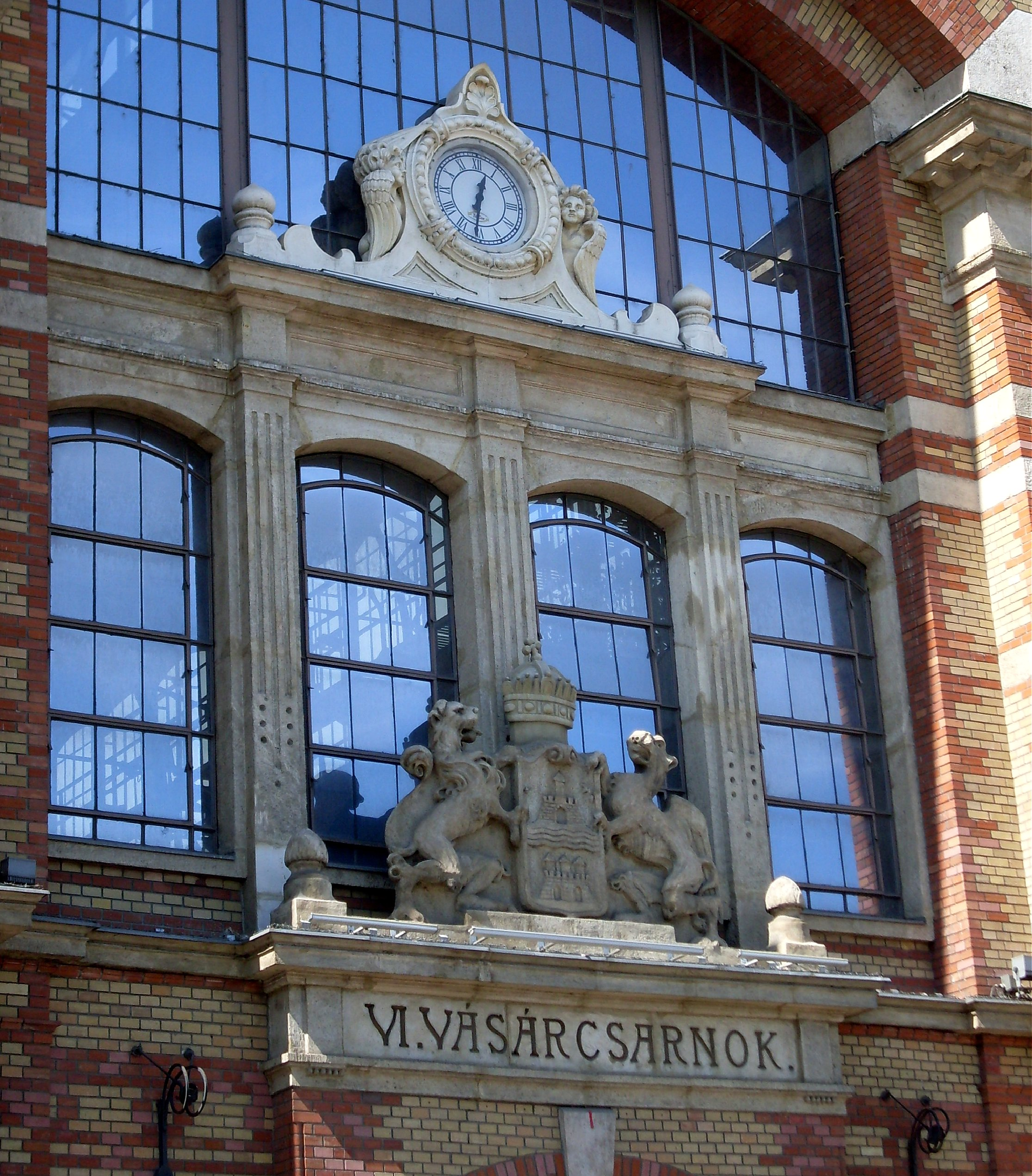

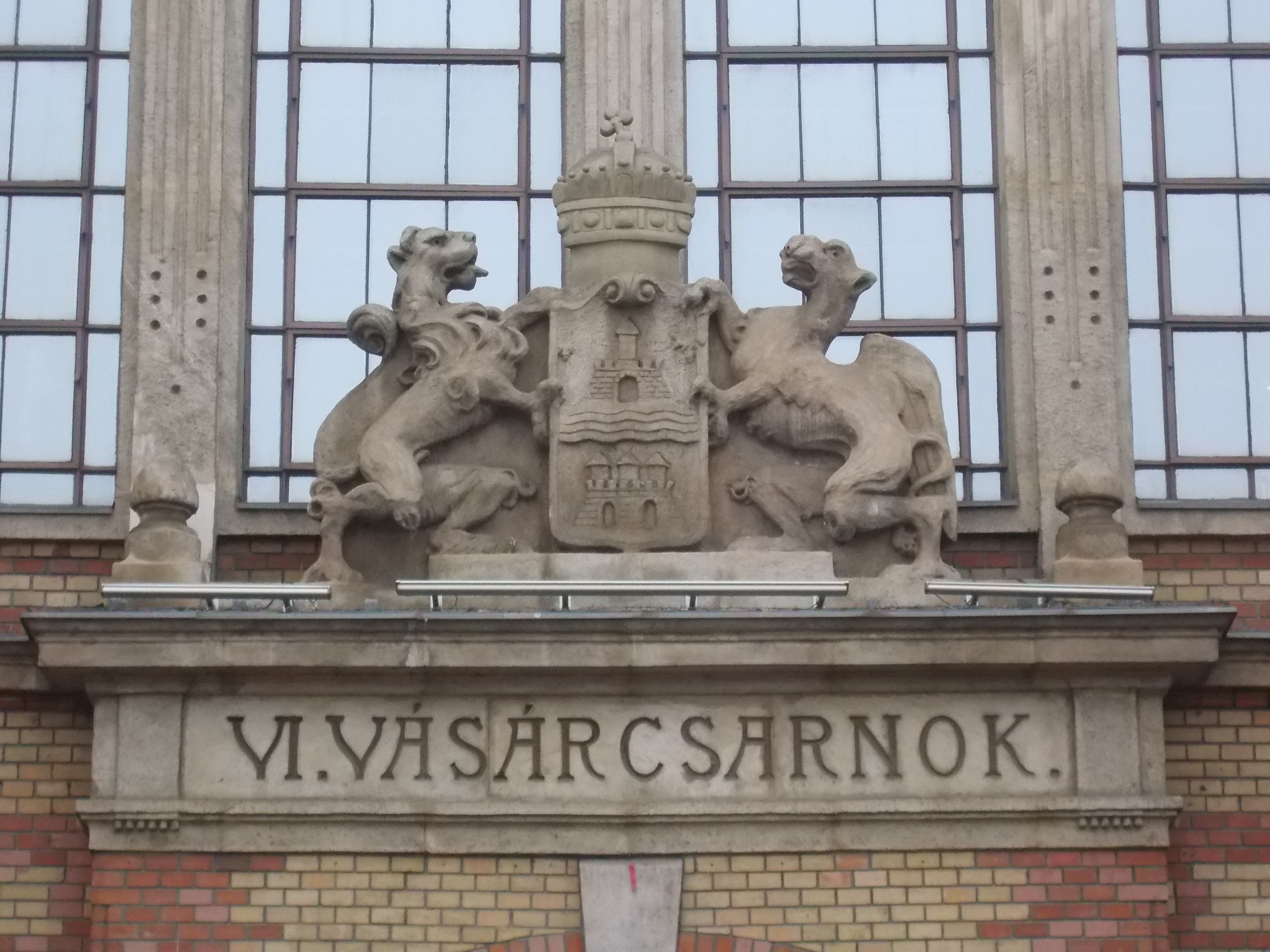

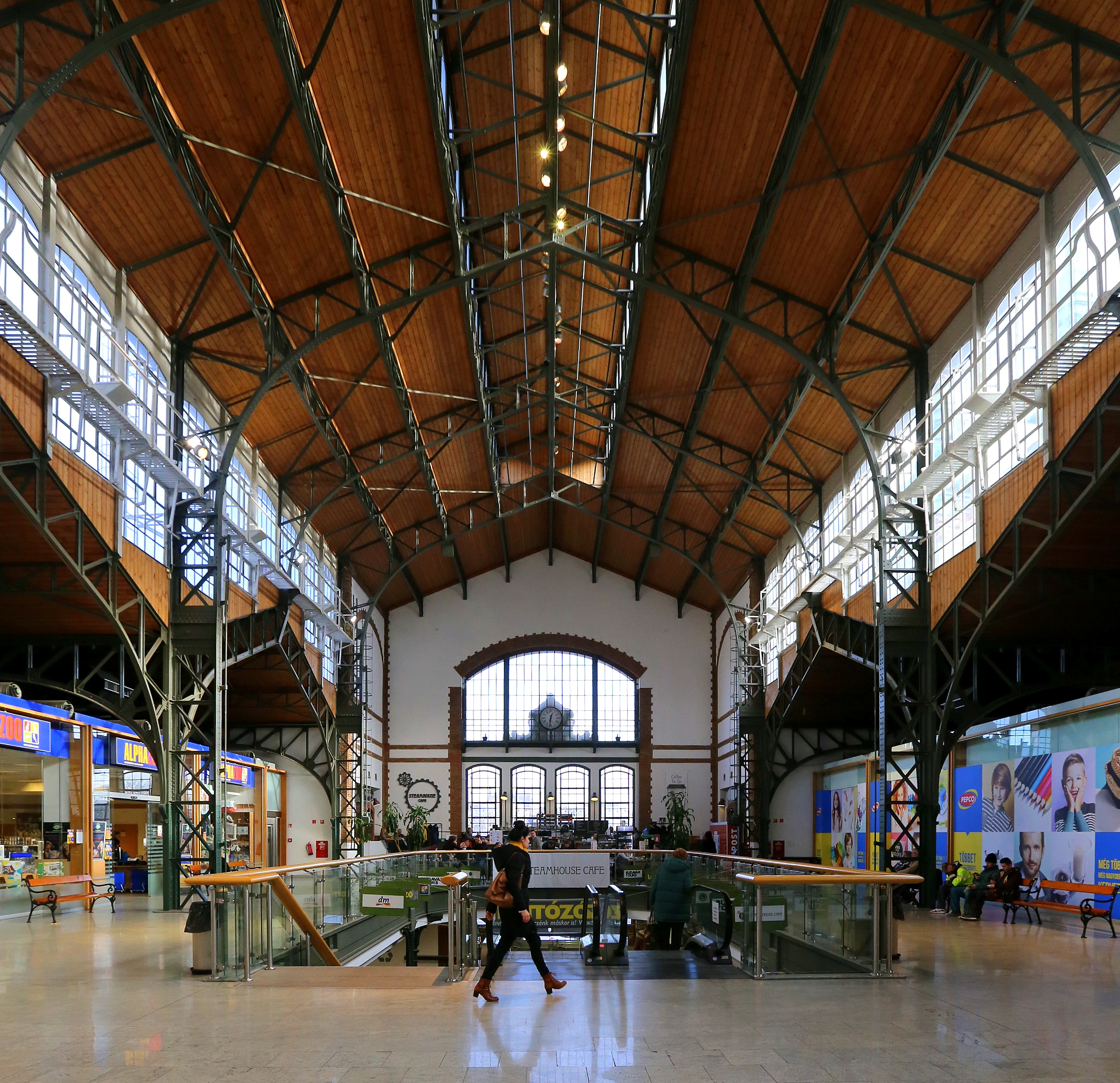

== Sources ==
- http://budapestcity.org/03-muemlekek/01/Batthyany-teri-vasarcsarnok/index-hu.htm
- http://www.szeretlekmagyarorszag.hu/4-budapesti-vasarcsarnok-regen-es-ma/
