= Zorilor =

District of Cluj-Napoca

Coordinates: 46°45′05″N 23°35′08″E

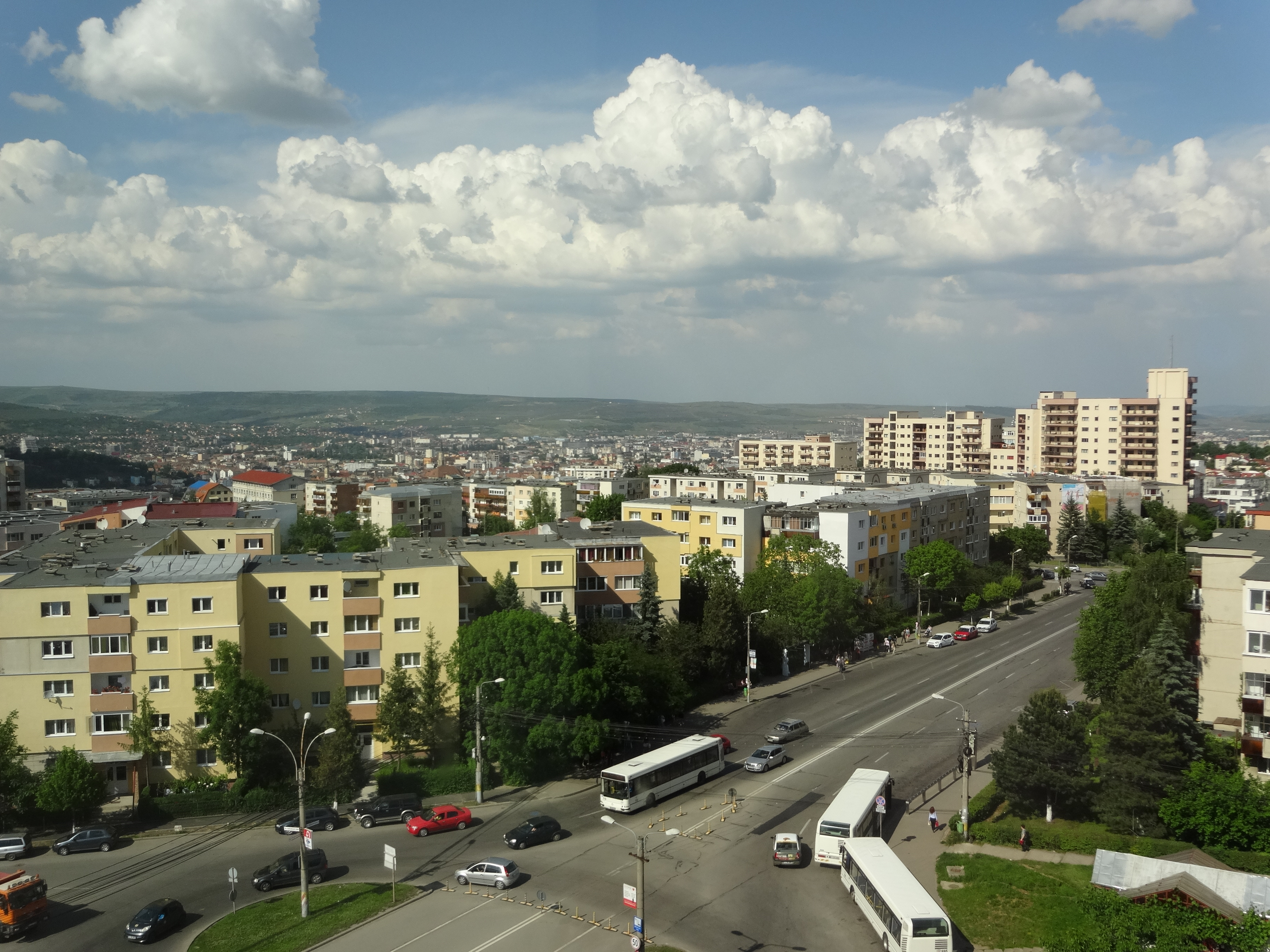
Zorilor from its western end

Zorilor is a southern district of Cluj-Napoca in Romania. It consists largely of blocks of flats ranging from 4 to 10 storeys. The district is home to the Observator student housing campus. Two 35-floor towers are projected to be constructed in the Sigma area of Zorilor.
