= Monitorul de Cluj =

- Director general: Sorin Stanislav
- Director editorial: Paul Niculescu
- Categories: Newspaper
- Frequency: daily, 5 days/week
- Publisher: Monitorul de Cluj
- First issue: 26 June 1998
- Company: SC Monitorul de Cluj SRL
- Country: Romania
- Based in: Cluj-Napoca
- Language: Romanian
- Website: www.monitorulcj.ro
- ISSN: 2065-6408 (print); 2284-6050 (web)

Monitorul de Cluj is a Romanian language daily newspaper published in Cluj-Napoca, Romania. It was first published on 26 June 1998. It is currently published by SC Monitorul de Cluj SRL, a privately owned company from Cluj-Napoca. Monitorul de Cluj is part of the media group Monitorul-Mesagerul, which is publishing the weeklies Mesagerul de Sibiu (print and on-line), Monitorul de Arieș (print edition only), Monitorul de Mediaș (print and on-line) and Mesagerul de Alba (on-line).

Monitorul de Cluj is the most read news portal in Cluj, the online extension of the daily newspaper, which has been published in Cluj since 1998. It publishes daily, in real time (24 hours a day, 7 days a week), news, reports, interviews, analyzes and investigations about all events in Cluj County, in Romania, and around the world.
