= Făclia =

Făclia (The Torch in English) (between 1989 and 2007 Adevărul de Cluj) is a daily newspaper published in Cluj-Napoca. The paper was among the official publications of the Cluj Region People Council and Party Committee during the communist era.
