= Săptămâna Clujeană =

Romanian Language financial newspaper

Săptămâna Clujeană is a Romanian language financial weekly newspaper published in Cluj-Napoca.
