= Informația Cluj =

Romanian free daily newspaper

Informația Cluj is a Romanian free daily newspaper published in Cluj-Napoca.
