= 1689 Brașov fire =

1689 fire in Kronstadt, modern Brașov

- Date: 21 April 1689
- Location: Brassó, Principality of Transylvania (now Brașov, Romania)
- Type: Fire
- Deaths: Around 300

The 1689 Brașov fire took place in the town of Brassó in the Principality of Transylvania (now Brașov, in Romania; German Kronstadt). It broke out on the afternoon of 21 April in the lower (i.e. southwestern) parts of Burggasse and Schwarzgasse streets (today Str. Castelului and Str. Nicolae Bălcescu). A powerful wind caused the rapid spread of the fire. The fire soon engulfed the entire part of the town facing the Tâmpa mountain. Local fires also appeared in Roßmarkt (today Str. George Barițiu) and Purzengasse (today Str. Republicii). Within a few hours, the entire town was in flames. The White Tower, the Black Tower, the Council House and the Black Church were all damaged in the fire. Church services were held outdoors for a long time. Johannes Honter's renowned library also burnt down.

Some people claim that the blaze was started by Habsburg troops.

Around 300 people died. The town was practically destroyed, and its economic power was severed. For years, Kronstadt remained a city in ruins, blackened by smoke with a lingering, penetrating smell. Most houses were built with wood, which facilitated the spread of flames even further. Moreover, water was scarce in the mountain town. Subsequently, the authorities banned wooden houses, which is why the historic center of Brașov features only stone and brick houses. Reconstruction of the city took place over many decades.

A common misconception is that the Black Church got its name because it was sooted by the fire. However, 21st century studies found no signs of the destructive fire. The church got blackened simply because of environmental pollution after Brașov turned into an industrial city. Furthermore, the name "Black Church" was not used until the end of the 19th century.
