= St. Michael's Church, Cluj-Napoca =

St Michael's Church
- Roman Catholic Church of St Michael; Biserica Romano-Catolică Sfântul Mihail (in Romanian)
- Biserica Sfântul Mihail (in Romanian); Szent Mihály-templom (in Hungarian); Klausenburger Michaelskirche (in German)
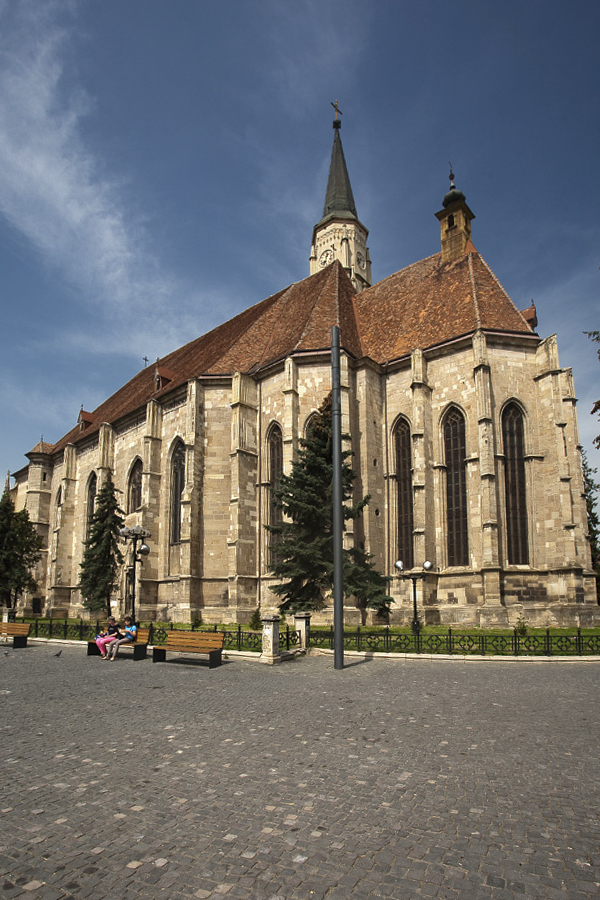
- St Michael's Church
- 46.76996°N 23.58932°E
- Location: Union Square, Cluj-Napoca, Transylvania
- Address: Piața Unirii 16.
- Country: Romania
- Denomination: Catholic Church

History
- Status: Active
- Dedication: Michael the Archangel

Architecture
- Functional status: Parish church
- Heritage designation: Monument istoric
- Designated: 2010
- Style: Gothic, Baroque and Gothic Revival (tower)
- Groundbreaking: 1316
- Completed: 1487

Specifications
- Length: 70 m
- Materials: Stone

Administration
- Archdiocese: Alba Iulia

Monument istoric
- Official name: Biserica romano-catolică „Sf. Mihail”
- Designated: 2010
- Reference no.: CJ-II-m-A-07469

The St. Michael's Church (Romanian: Biserica Sfântul Mihail, Hungarian: Szent Mihály-templom, German: Michaelskirche) is a Gothic-style Roman Catholic church in Cluj-Napoca. It is the second largest church (after the Biserica Neagră of Brașov) in the geographical region of Transylvania, Romania. The nave is 50 meters long and 24 meters wide, the apse is 20×10 m. The tower with its height of 76 meter (80 meter including the cross) is the highest one in Transylvania.

== History ==
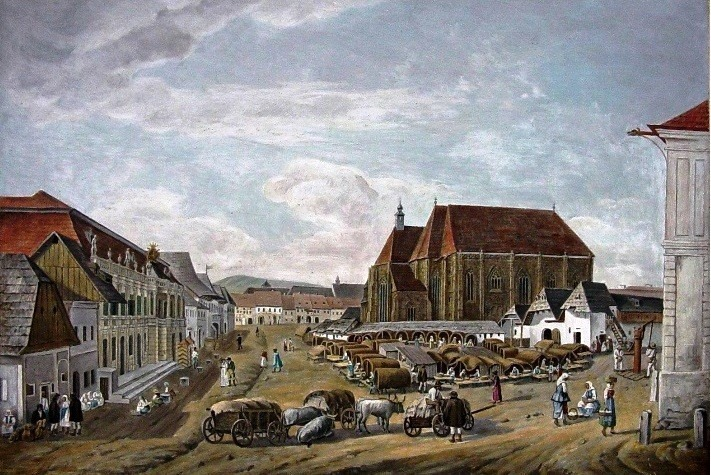
In 1840

The construction was begun probably in place of the Saint James Chapel. The financing of the church was partly done by the citizens, partly from the income of indulgences. The first related document, dating back to 1349 and signed by the archbishop of Avignon and fifteen other bishops, grants the indulgence for those contributing to the illumination and furniture of the Saint Michael Church. The construction was completed between 1442 and 1447, the old tower being built between 1511 and 1545. The tower that stands today was erected in 1862.

The church was converted, along with the local population, to Lutheran Protestantism between 1545 and 1566. Then the more radical Unitarian party took it over in the period 1566–1716. At last, it was confiscated in the Counter-Reformation by the Catholic Church with the support of the Habsburg government.

The Baroque clock tower was replaced in the 19th century by a new one, built in the Gothic Revival style (1837–1862).

=== Events ===
Some important historical events that took place in the church:

- 26 July 1551: Queen Isabella of Hungary gives the Hungarian Crown to General Castaldo, the deputy of Ferdinand I., and cedes with that Hungary and Transylvania
- 23 October 1556: Queen Isabella returns and takes back the reign of Transylvania, in the name of her son, the child John II Sigismund Zápolya
- 27 March 1601: the third investiture of Sigismund Báthory as Prince of Transylvania
- 12 February 1607: election of Sigismund Rákóczi as Prince of Transylvania
- 7 March 1608: election of Gabriel Báthory as Prince of Transylvania
- 13 October 1613: election of Gabriel Bethlen as Prince of Transylvania
- 18 May 1944: the speech of Áron Márton, bishop of the Roman Catholic Church in Transylvania in which he strongly condemned the deportation of Jews.

== Description ==
The west portal is decorated with the three coats of arms of Sigismund as King of Hungary, as King of Bohemia and as Holy Roman Emperor.

The oldest of its sections is the altar, inaugurated in 1390, while the newest part is the Gothic Revival-style clock tower, which was built in 1837–1862 and replaced a Baroque predecessor.

== Gallery ==
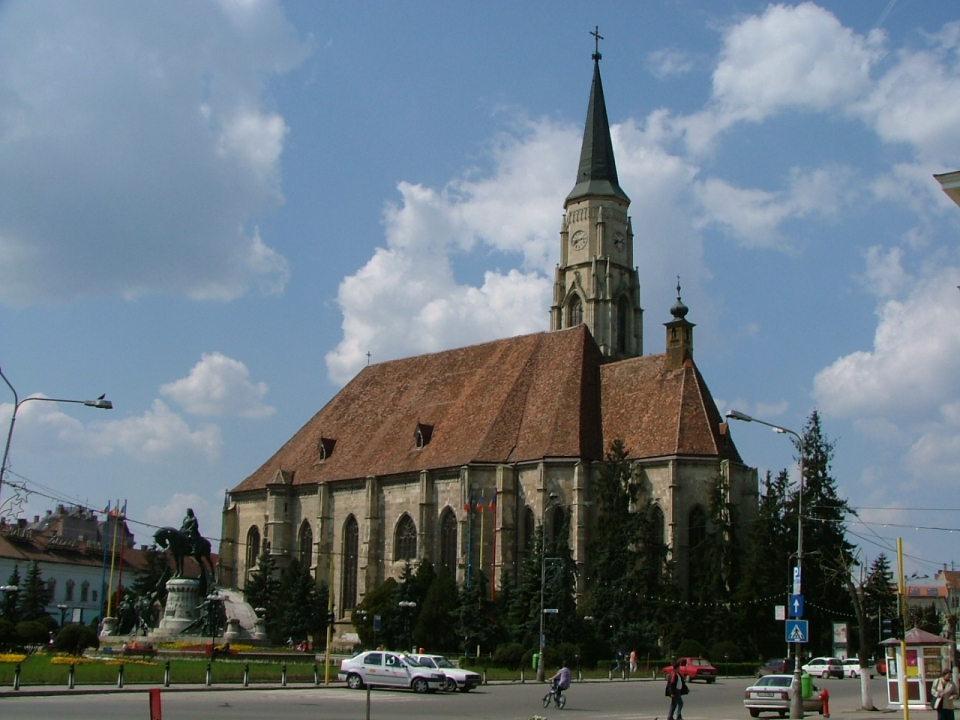
General view from SE

Church with Baroque tower (replaced by 1862)

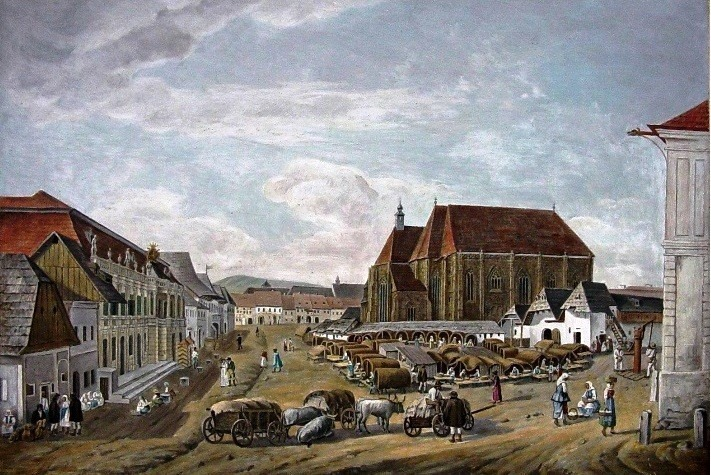
Church and city square (1840, Josef Hofreit)

Baroque gate into churchyard (west)

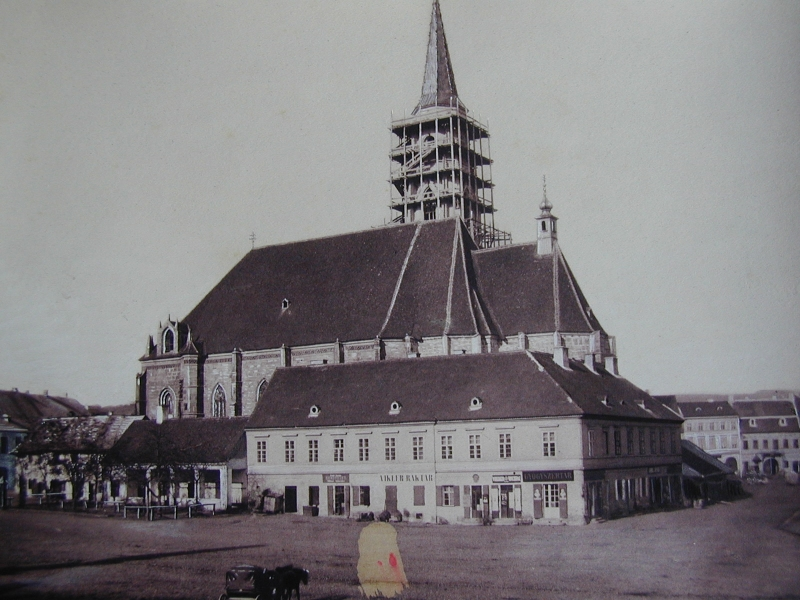
Church with adjacent buildings, new tower under construction (1850)

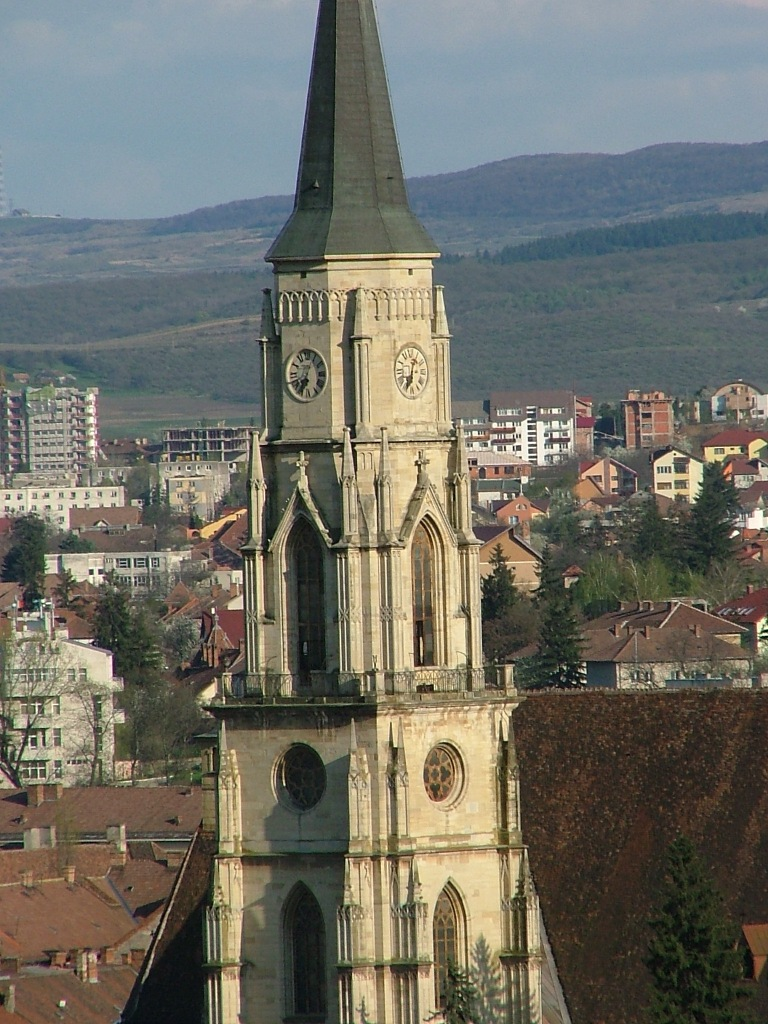
The 19th-century neo-Gothic tower

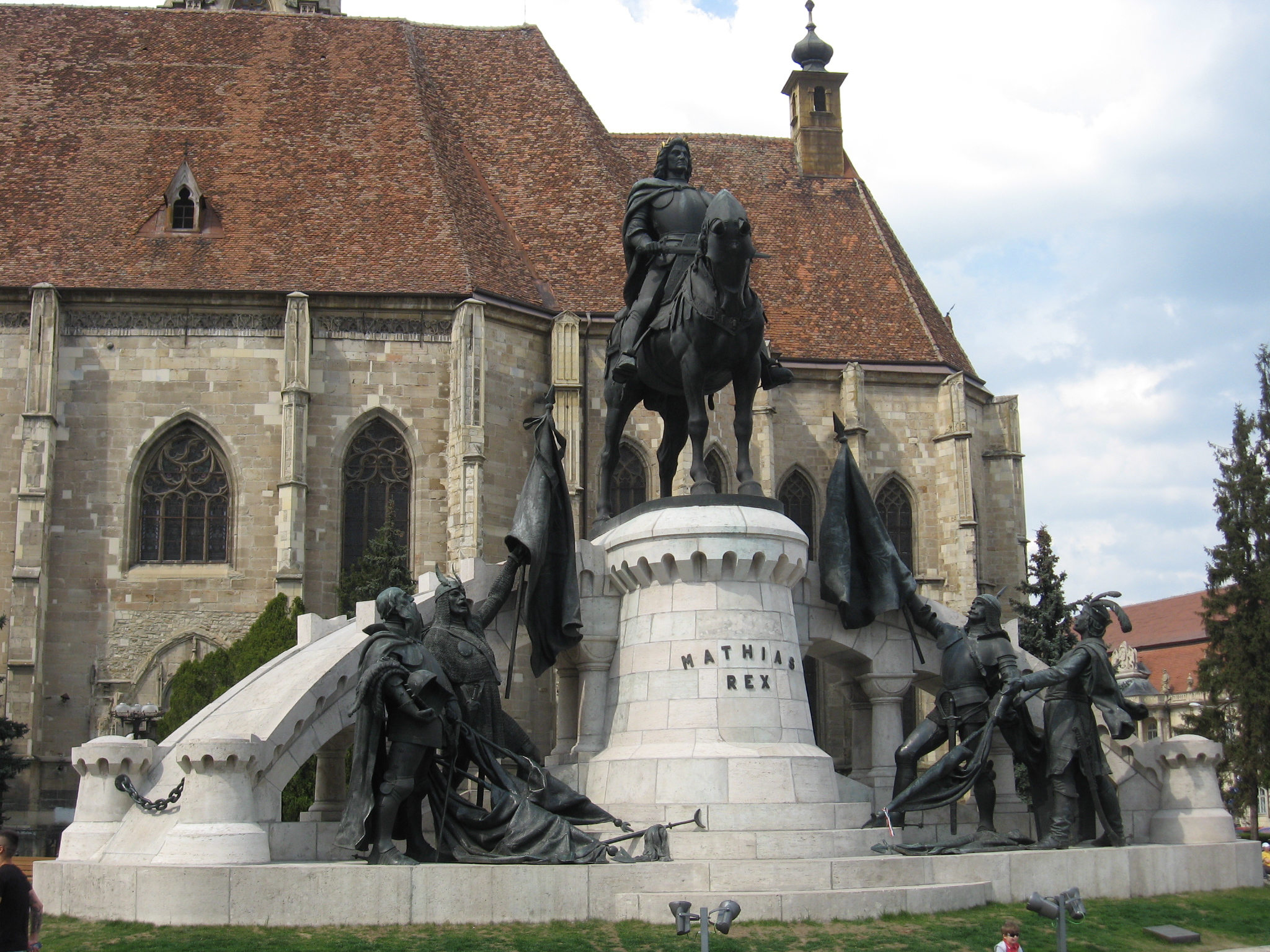
Matthias Corvinus Monument (1902)

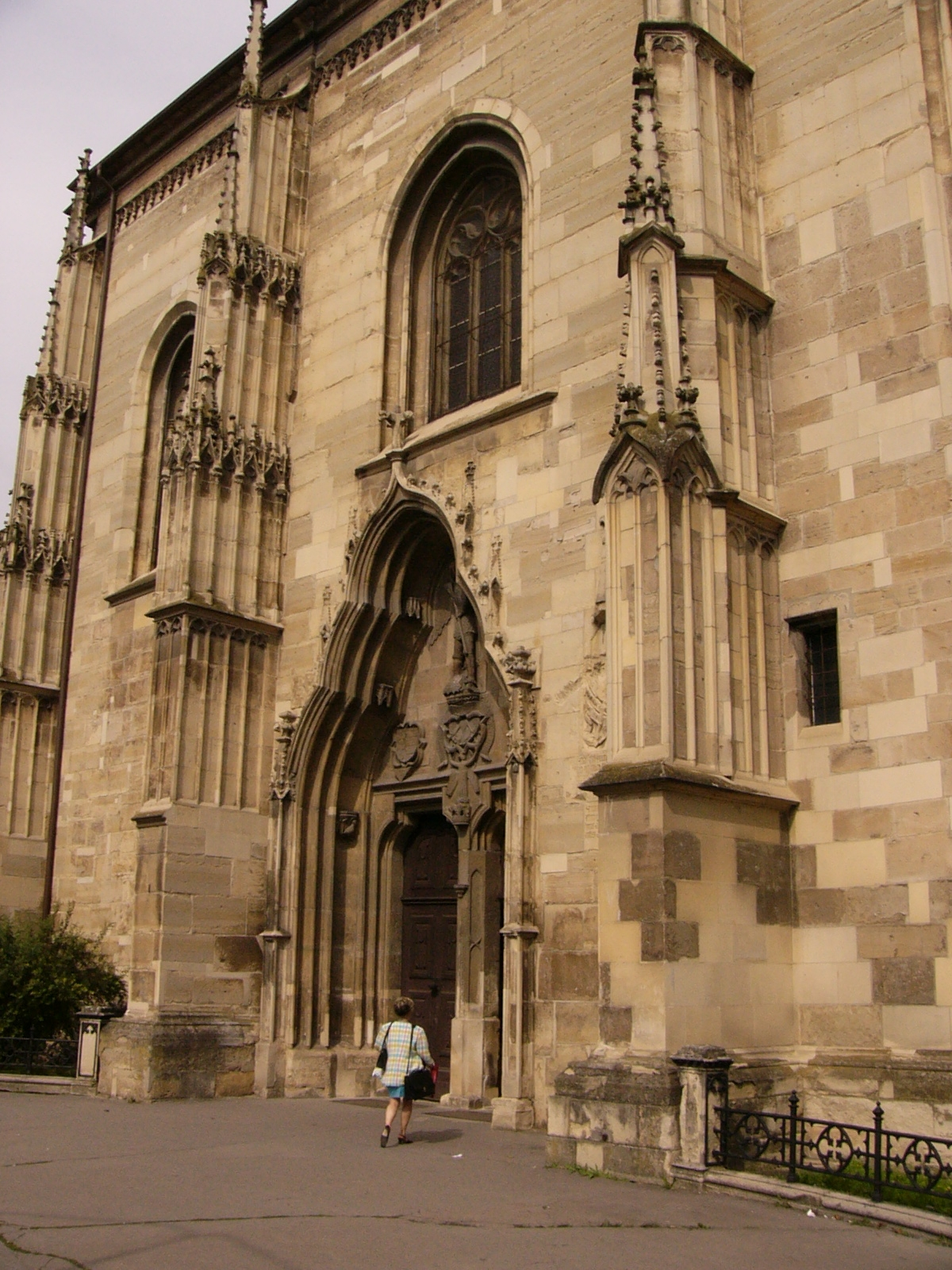
The entrance (west portal)

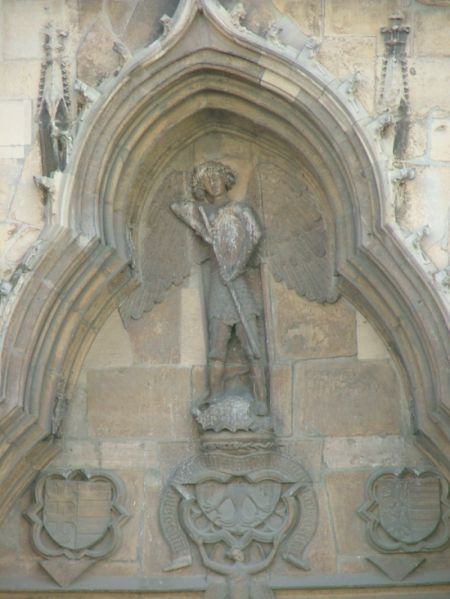
The three coats of arms of Sigismund I on west portal

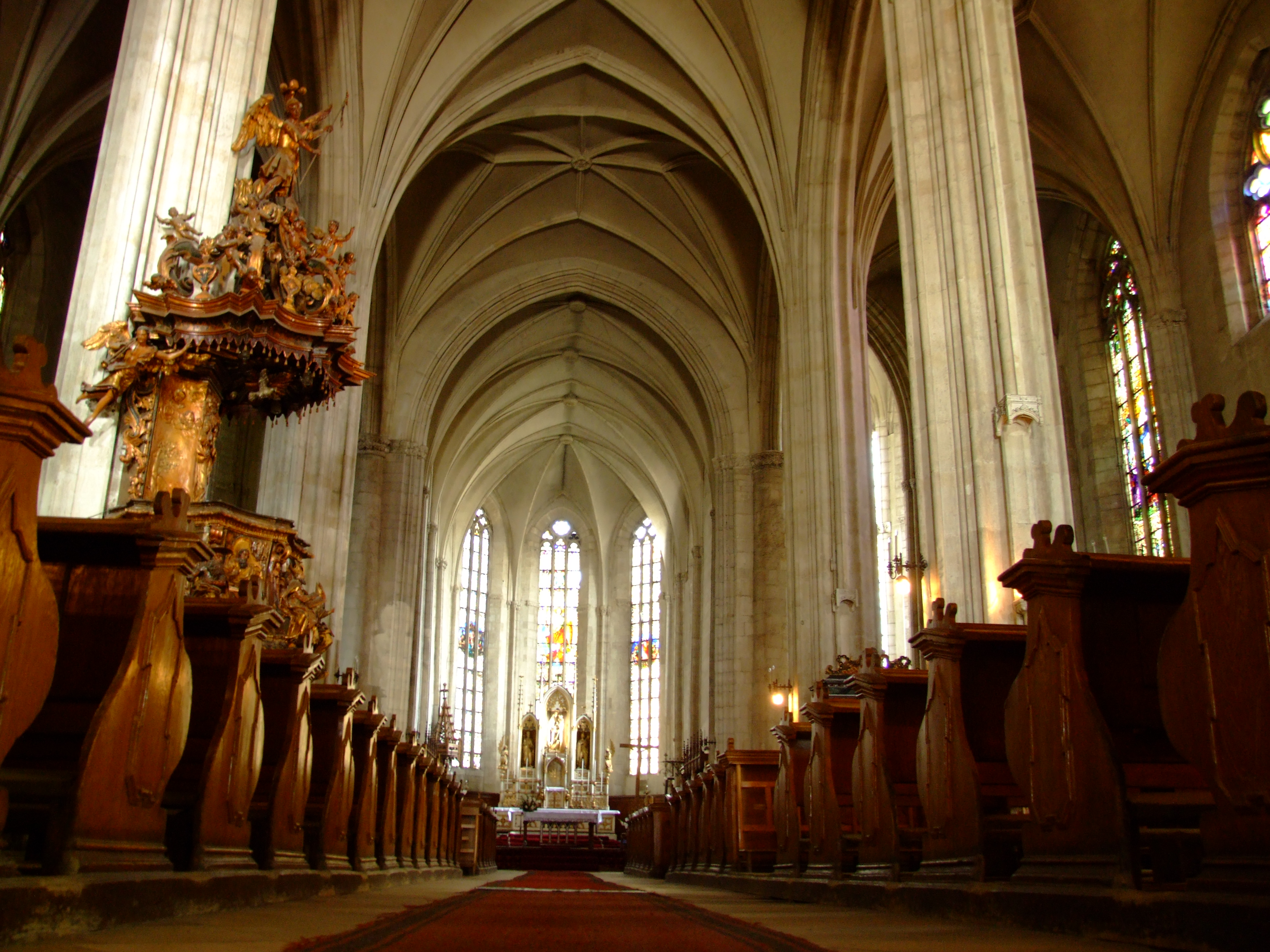
The interior

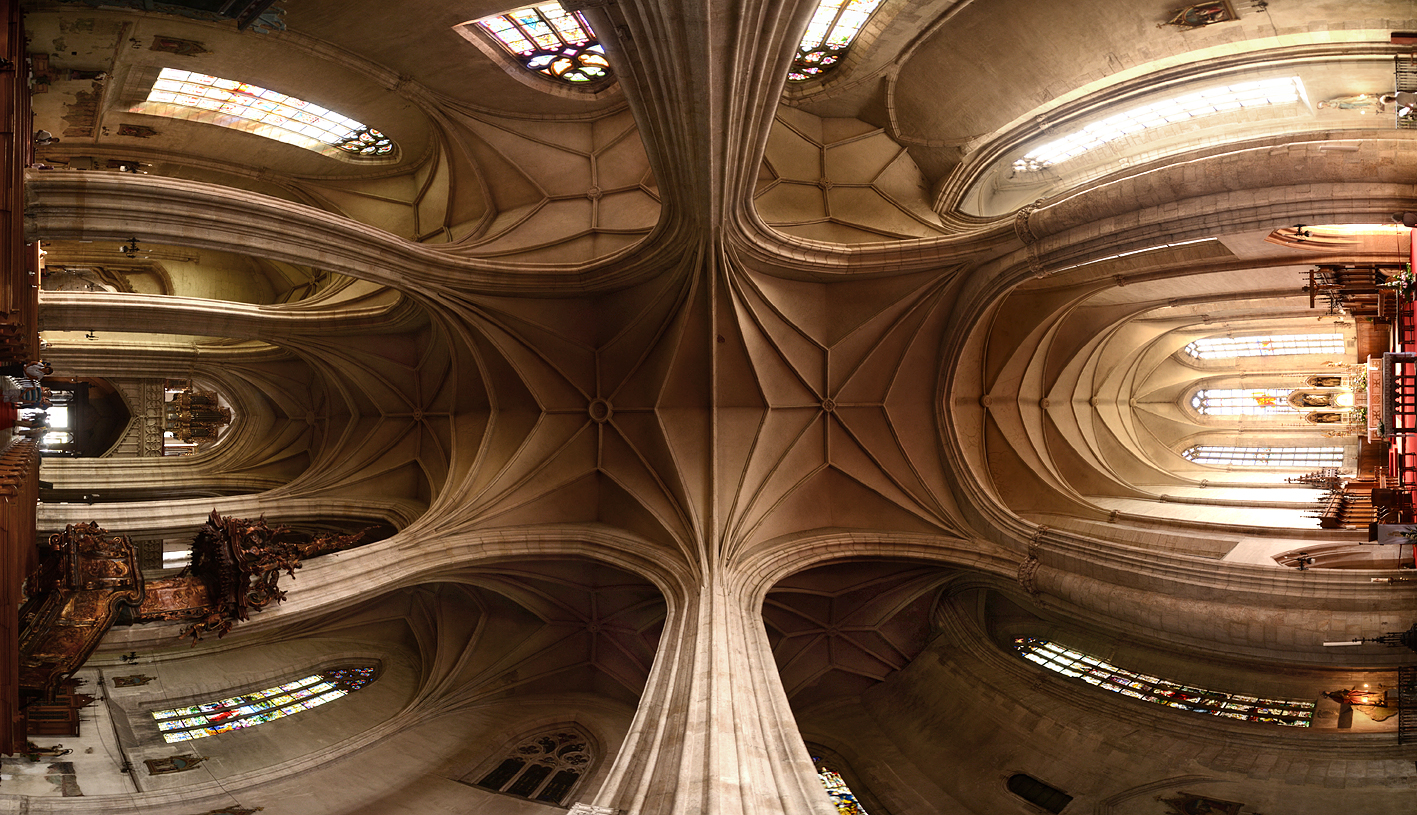
The vaulting system

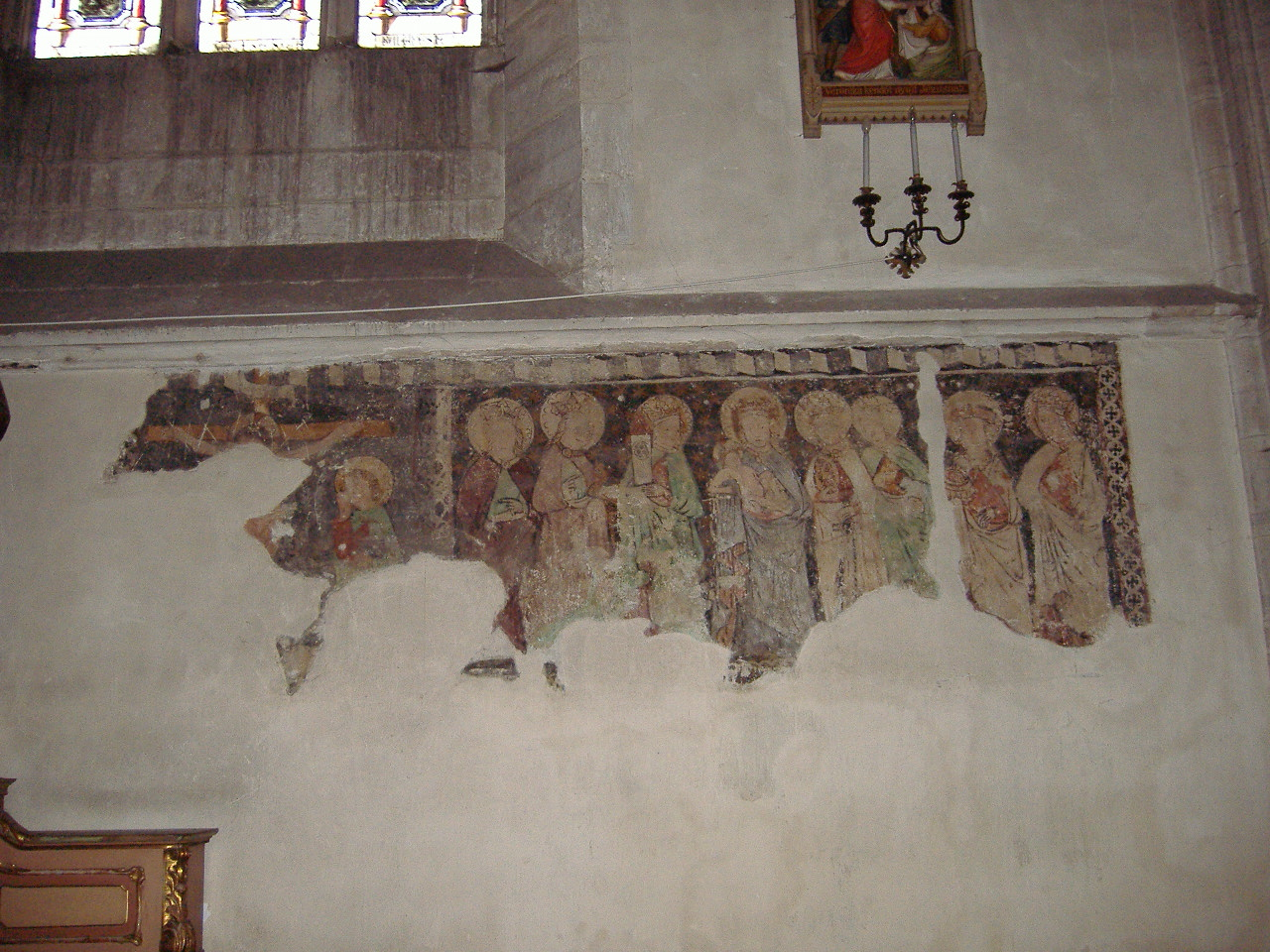
Restored fresco remains

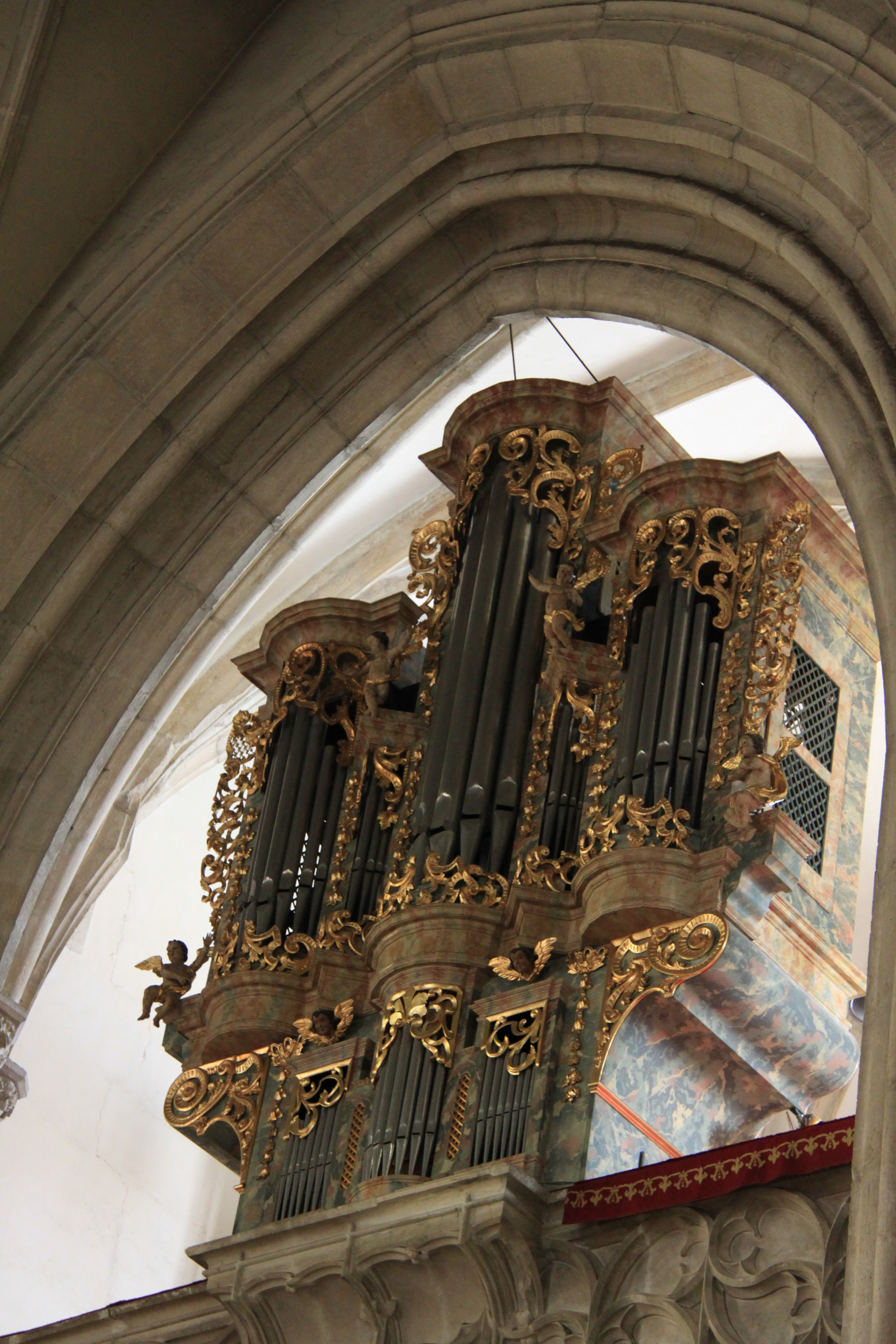
Pipe organ built in 1763 by Johannes Hahn

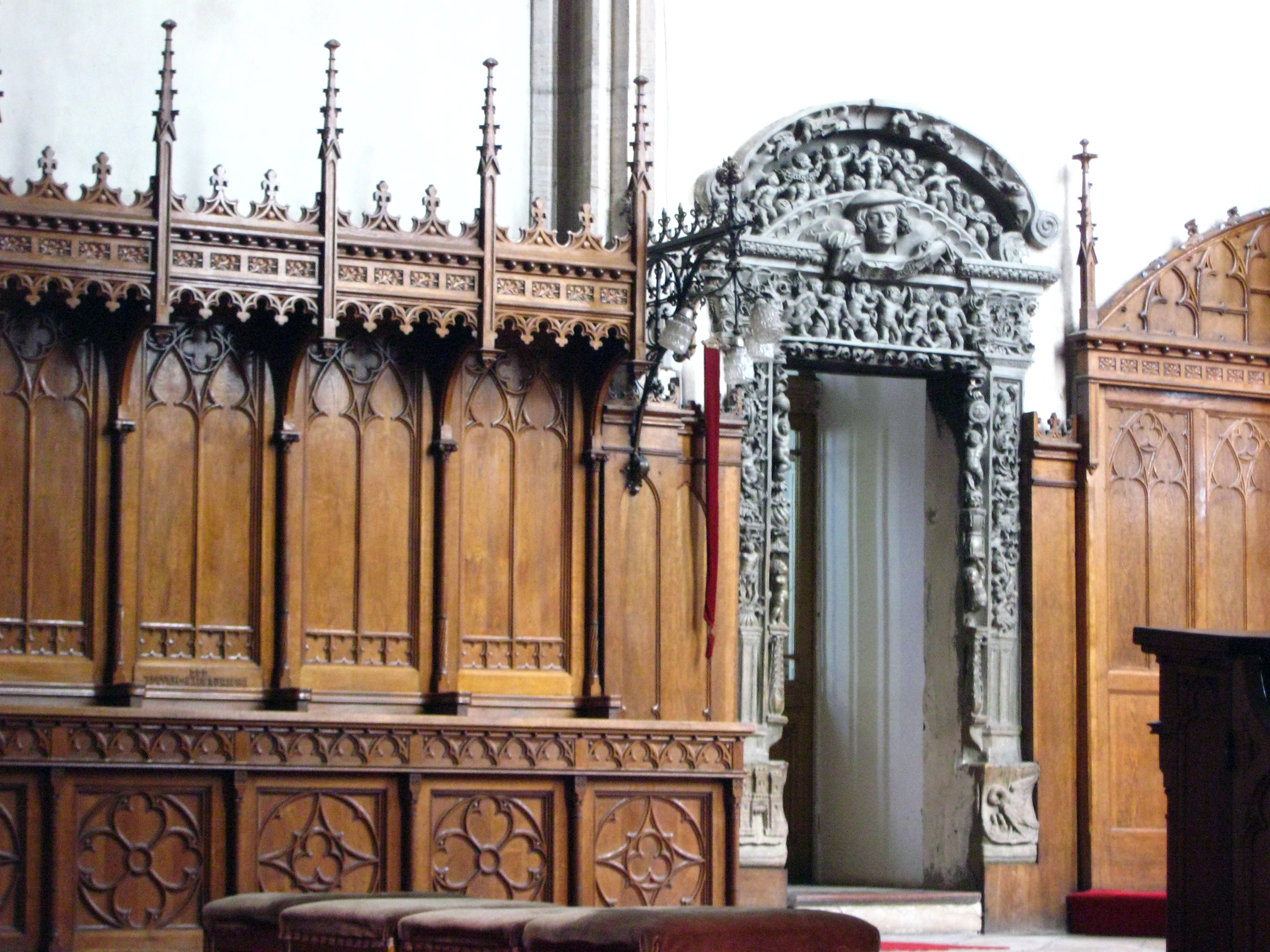
Sacristy made in 1528, at the order of parish priest Johannes Klein

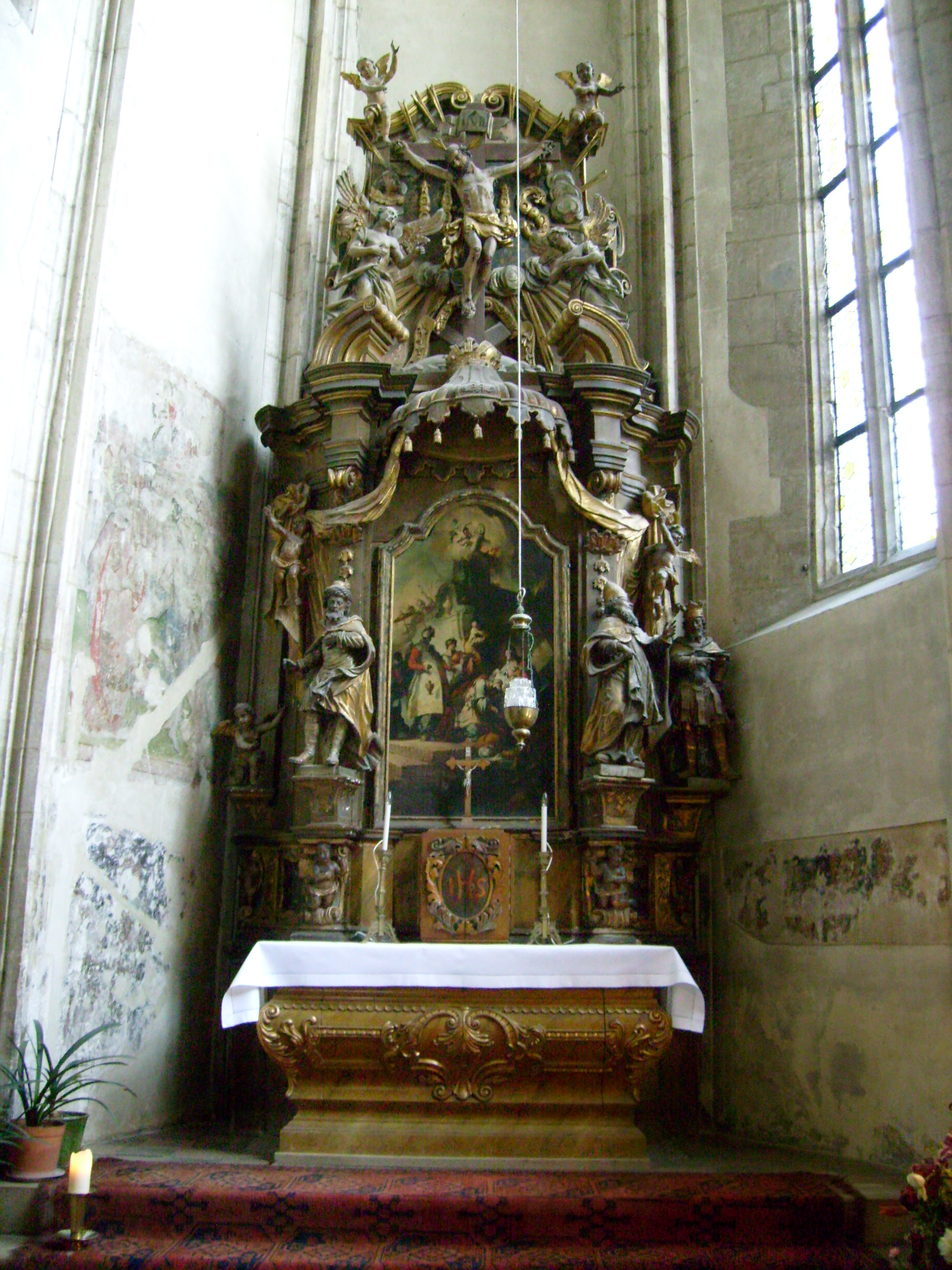
Altar with the Three Magi, sculpted by Johannes Nachtigall (1717–1761), painted by Franz Anton Maulbertsch (1724–1796).

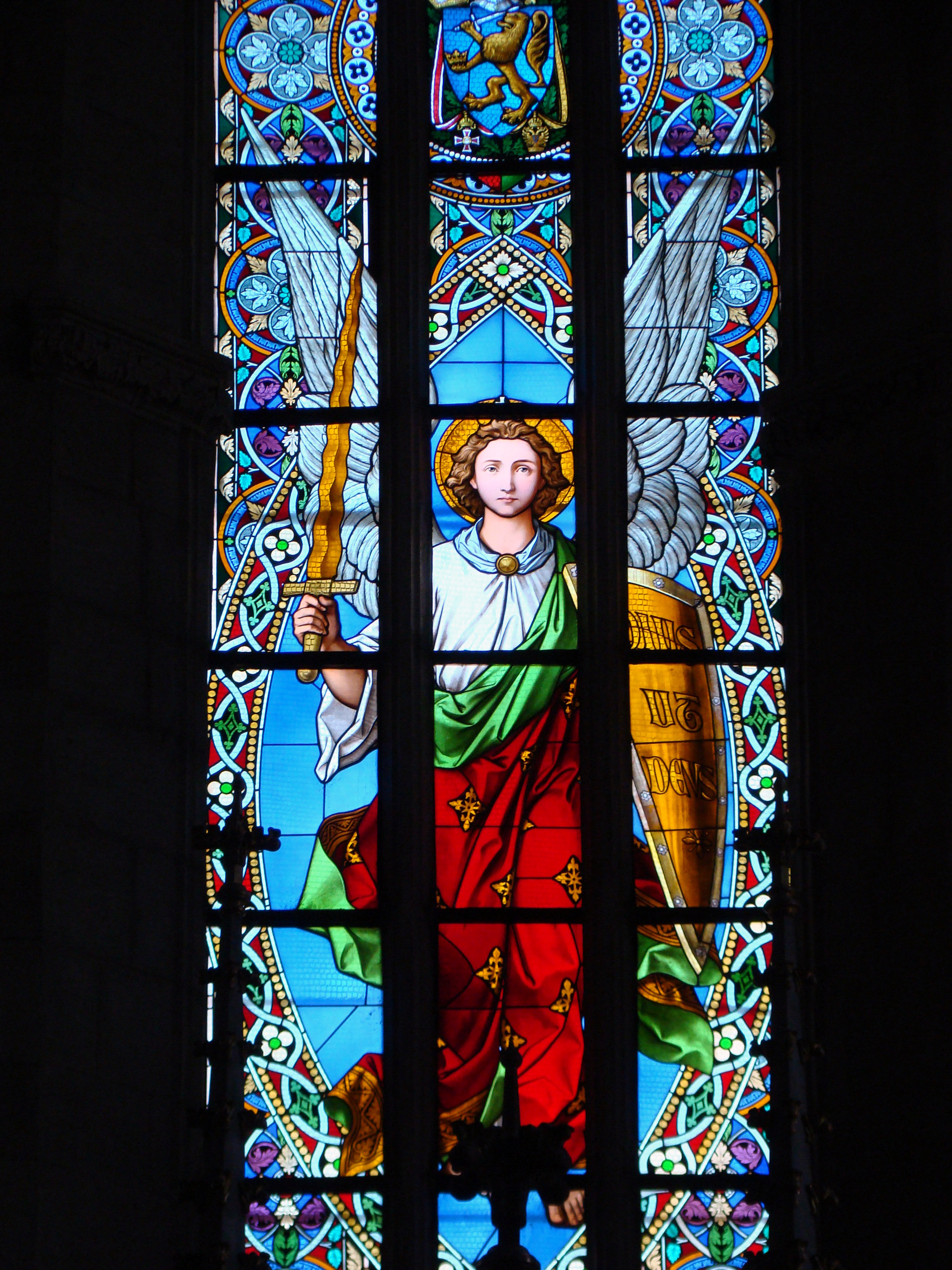
Glass window: Archangel Michael with Quis ut Deus? inscription

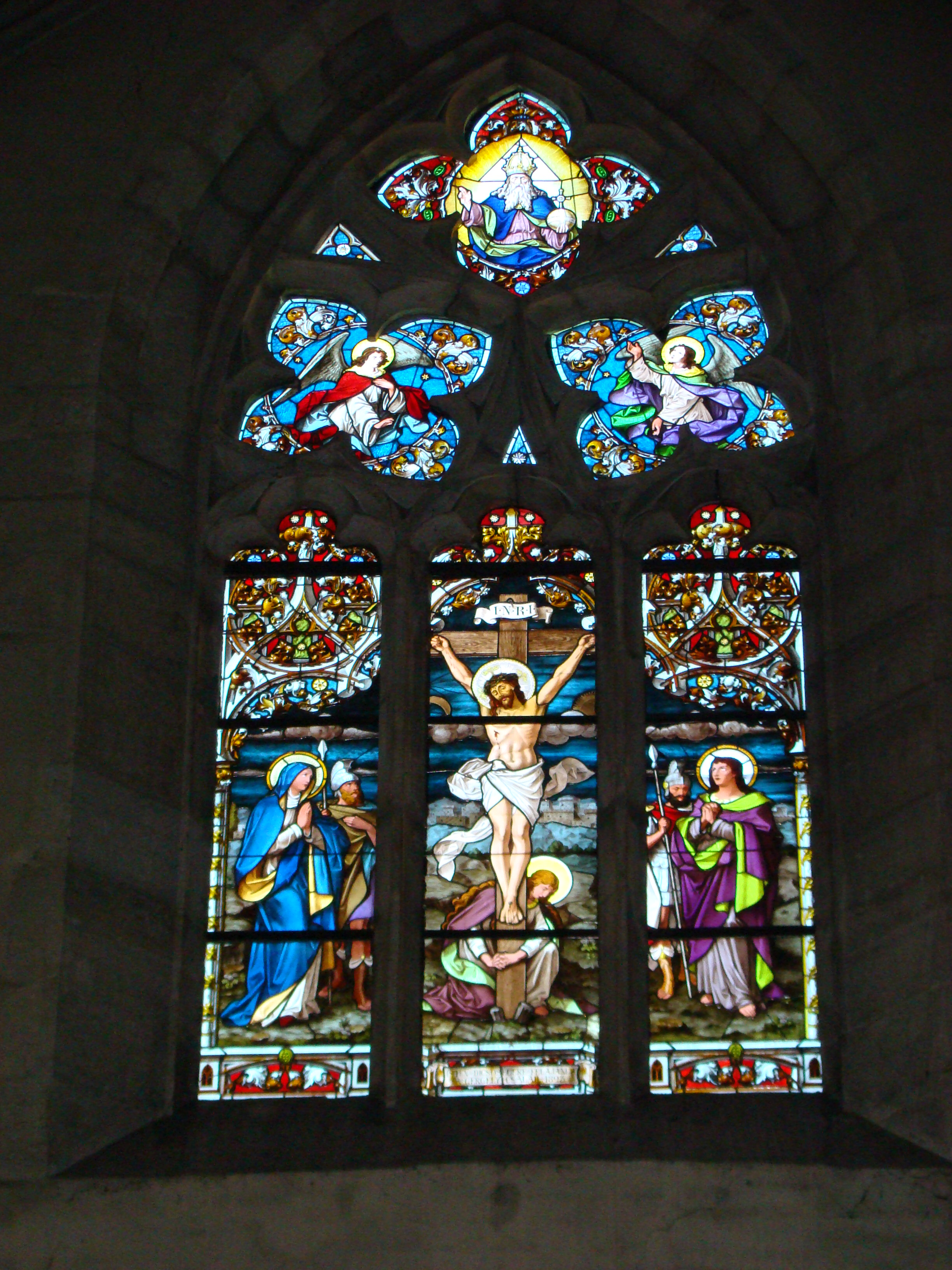
Glass window: Crucifixion of Jesus

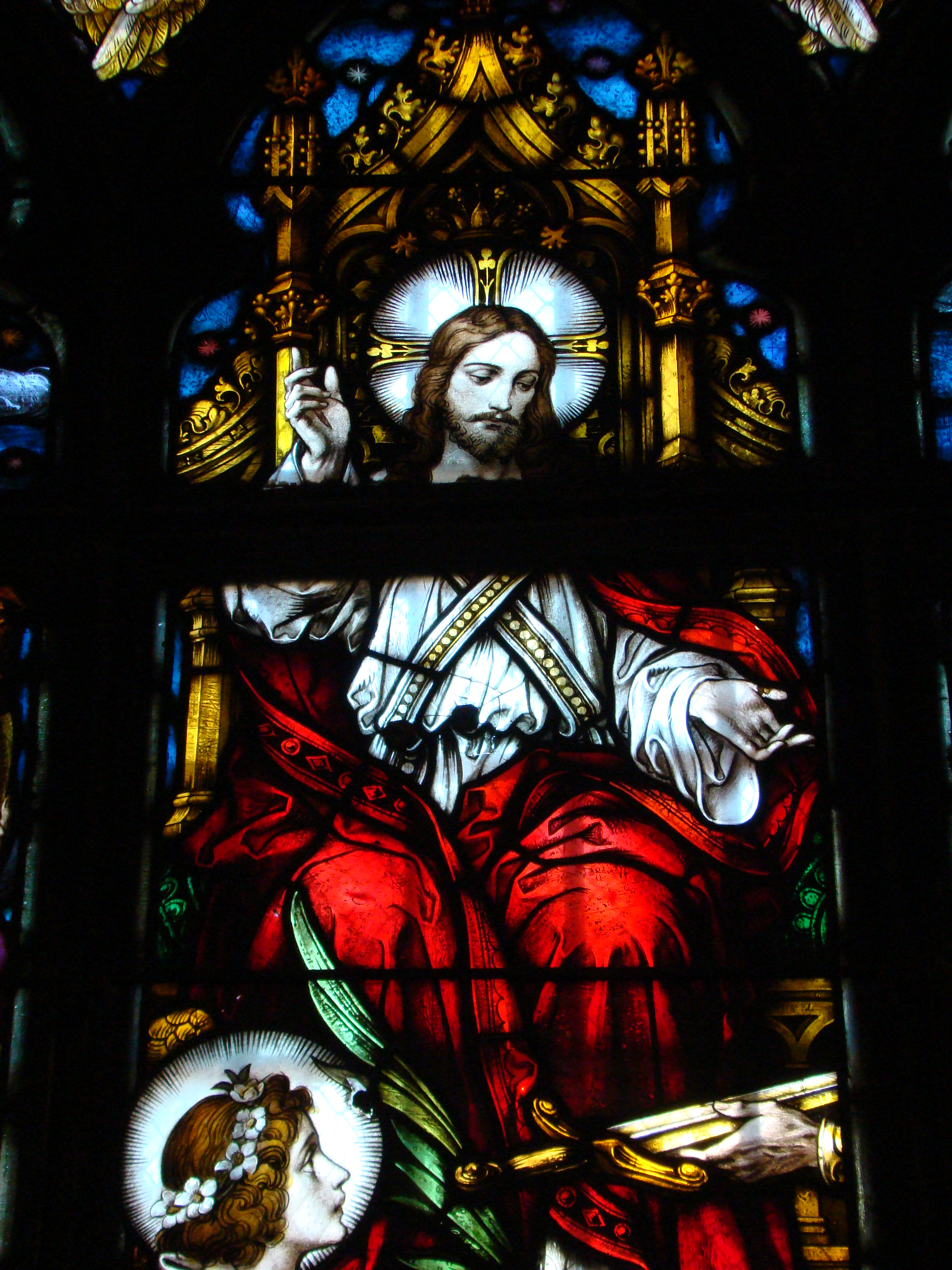
Glass window: Jesus blessing a sword

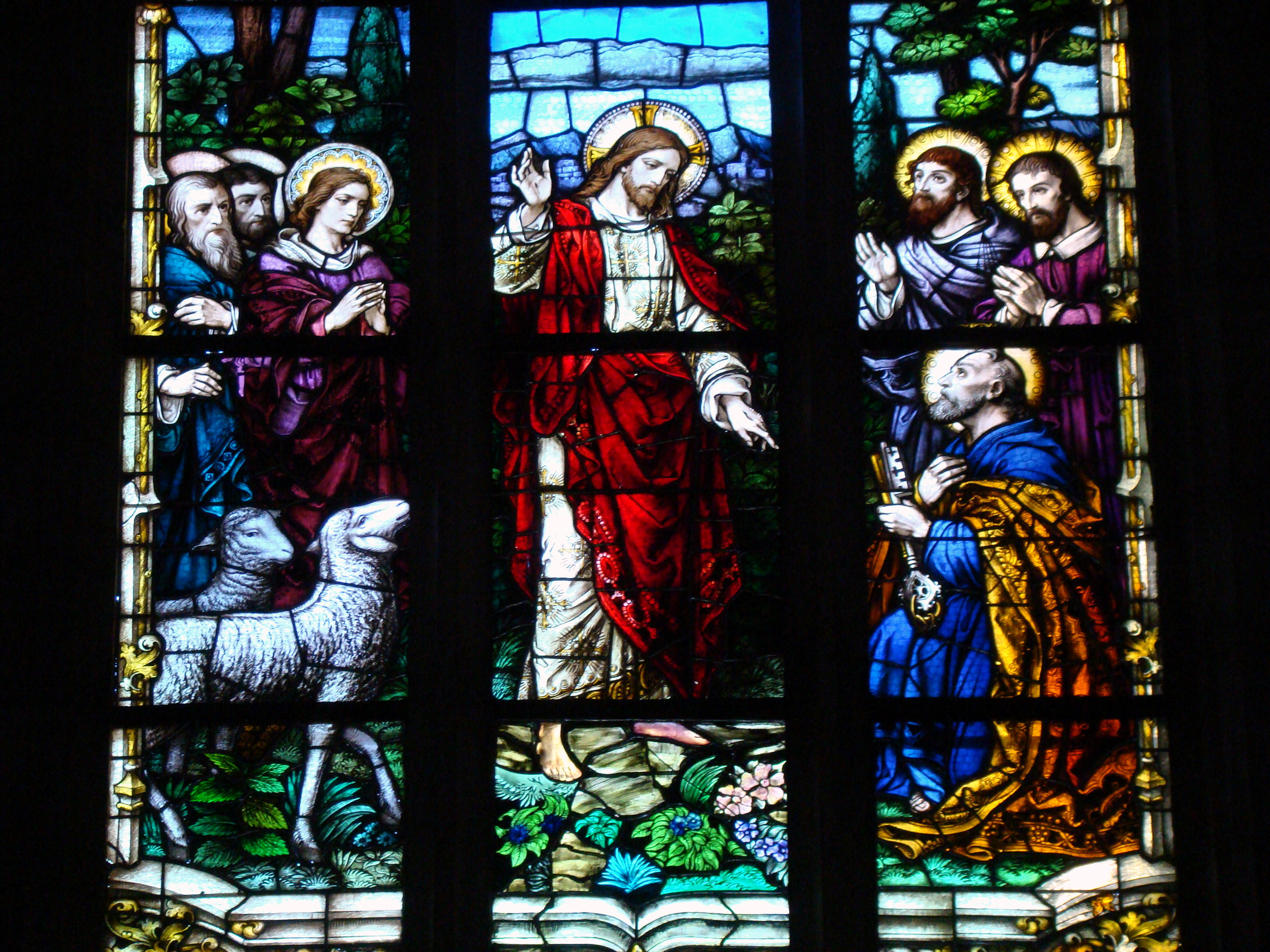
Glass window: Confession of Peter

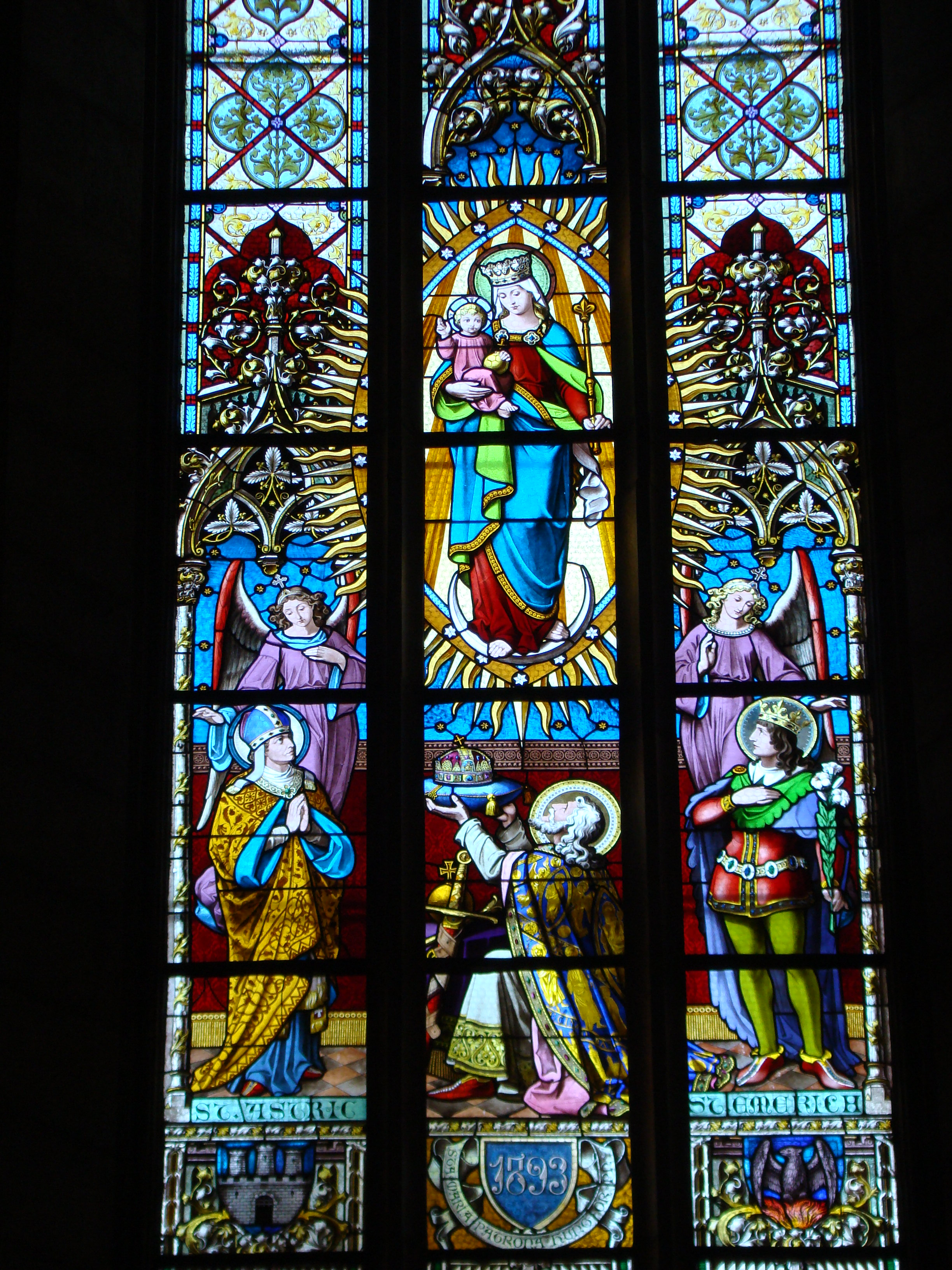
Glass window (1893): Mary and infant Jesus; below: Saints Astrik and Emeric of Hungary

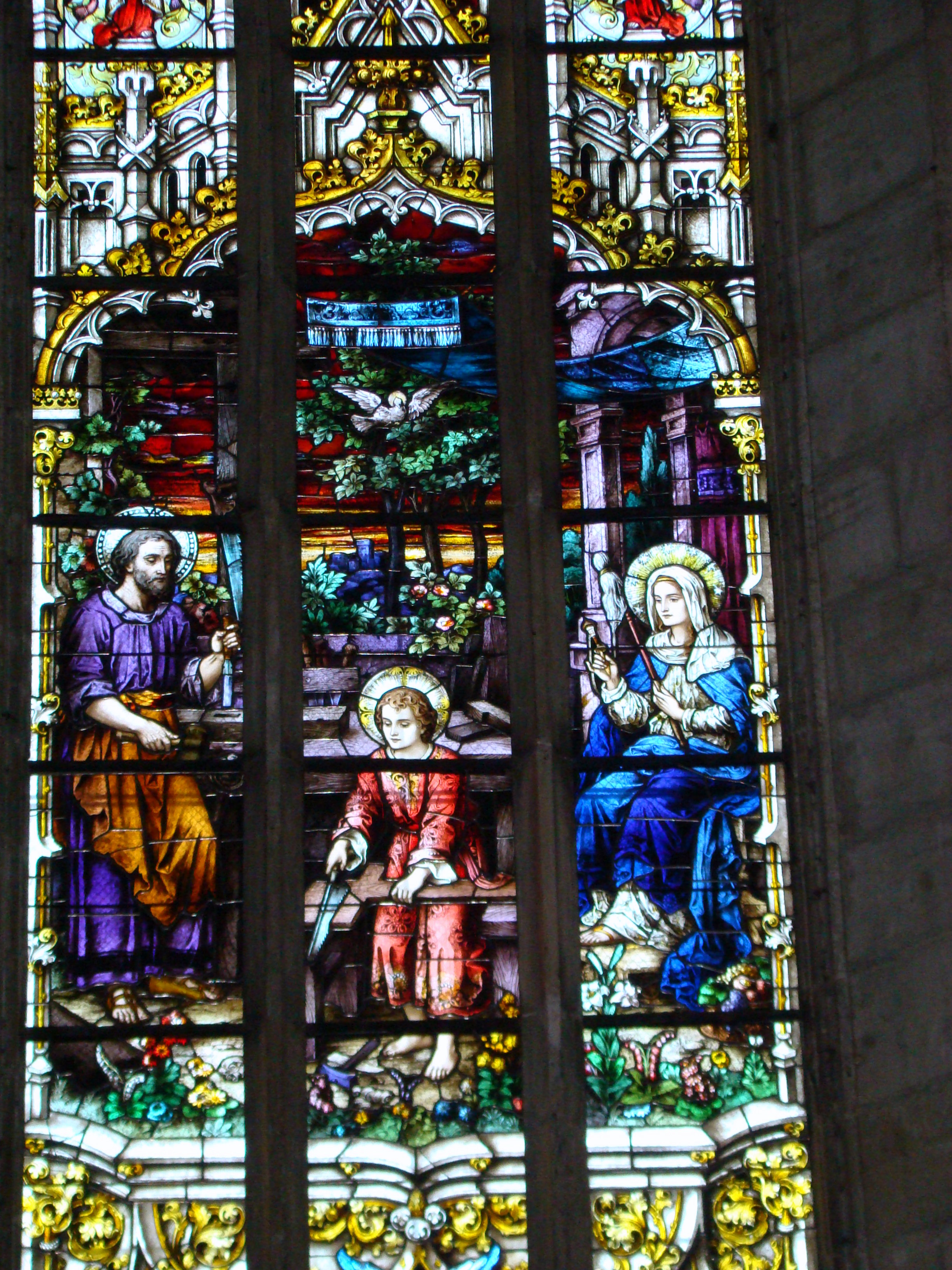
Glass window: Young Jesus in Joseph's carpentry shop

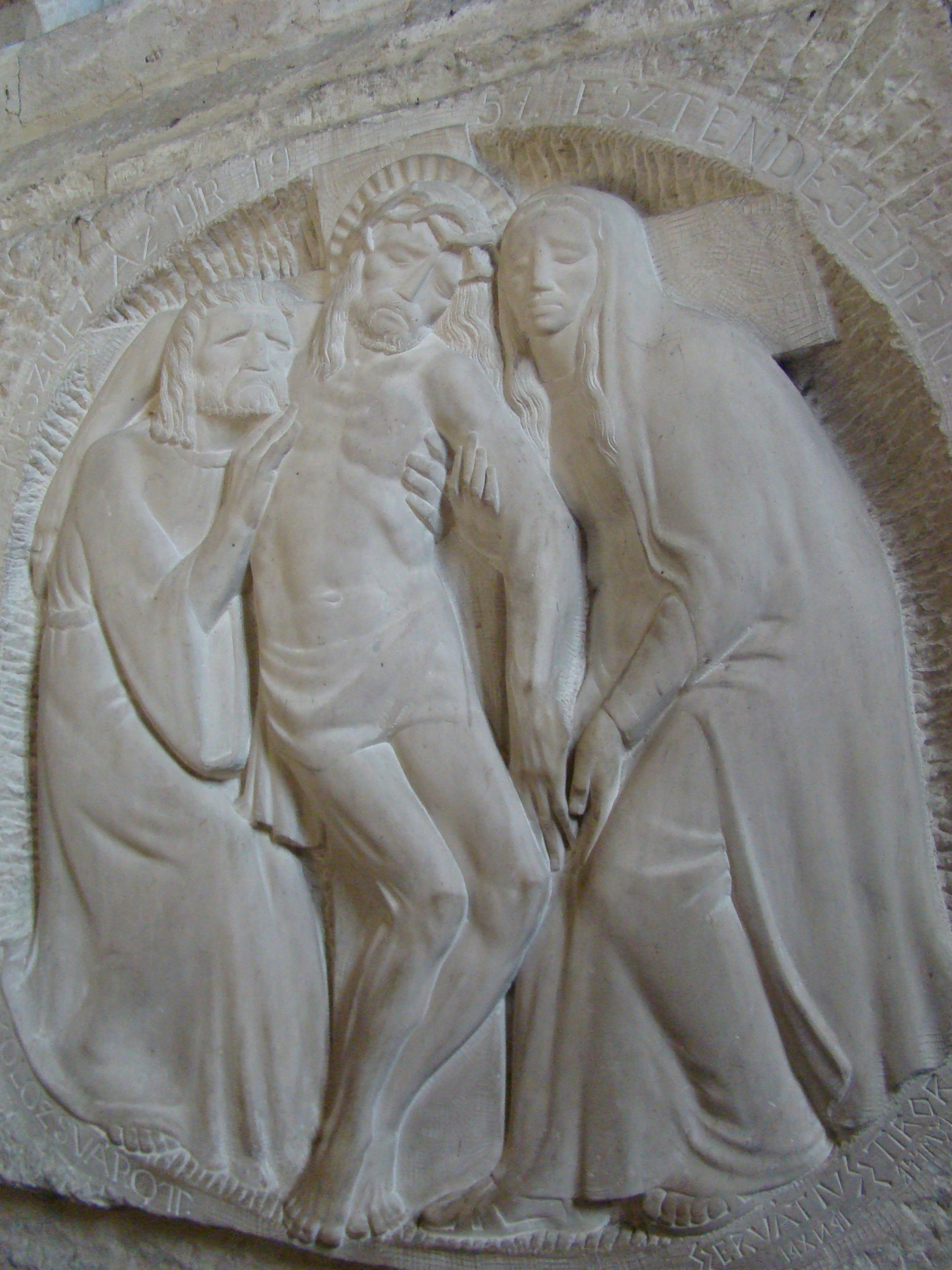
Relief (1957): Descent from the Cross

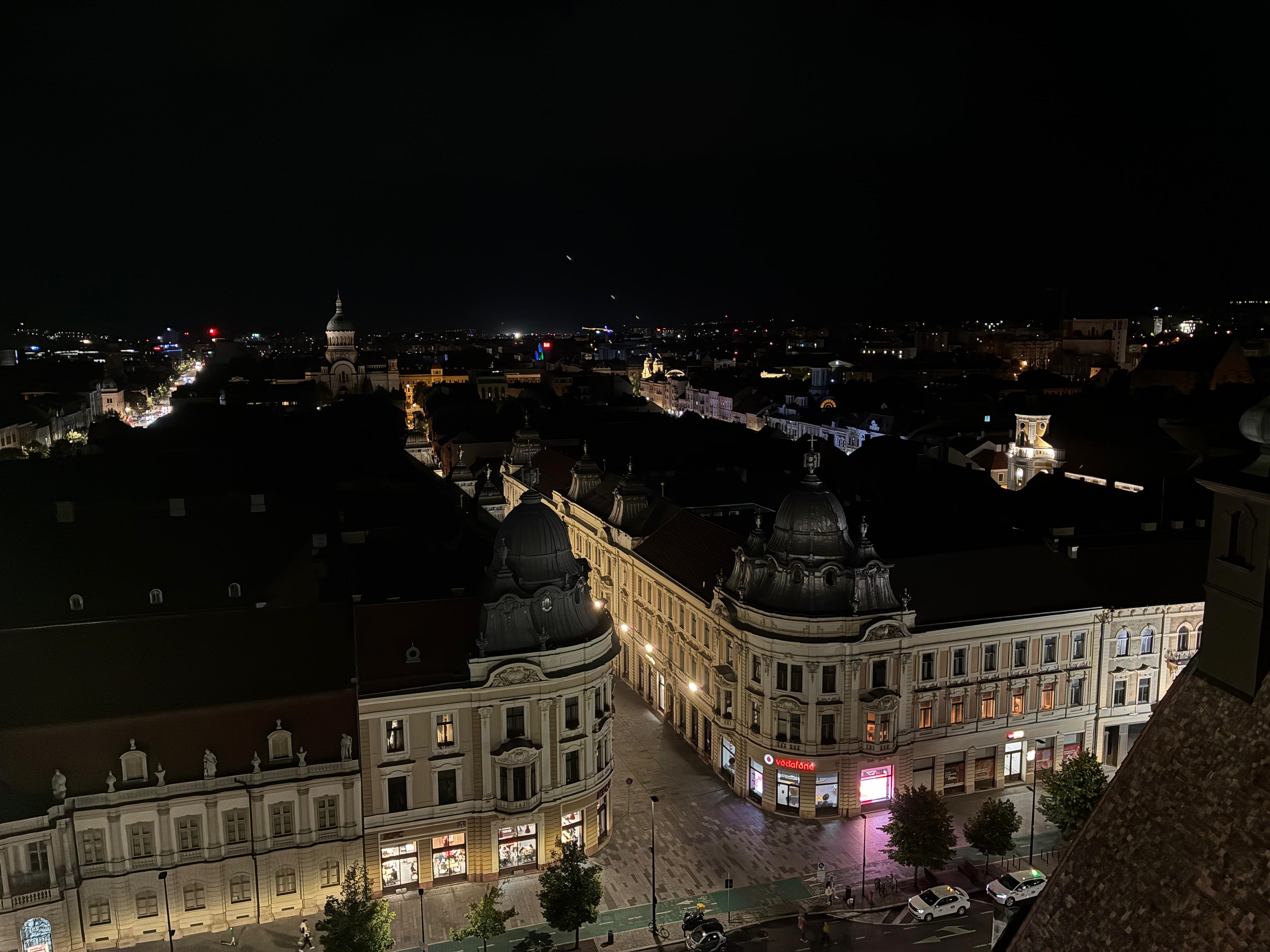
Night view from St. Michael's Church Tower

== See also ==
- Matthias Corvinus Monument (1902) stands in the square south of the church
- Saint Michael in the Catholic Church
