= Biserica Neagră =

Cathedral in Transylvania, Romania

Coordinates: 45.64101°N 25.58803°E

The Black Church of Romania
- Biserica Neagră din Brașov
- Die Schwarze Kirche (German), Fekete templom (Hungarian) and Biserica Neagră (Romanian)
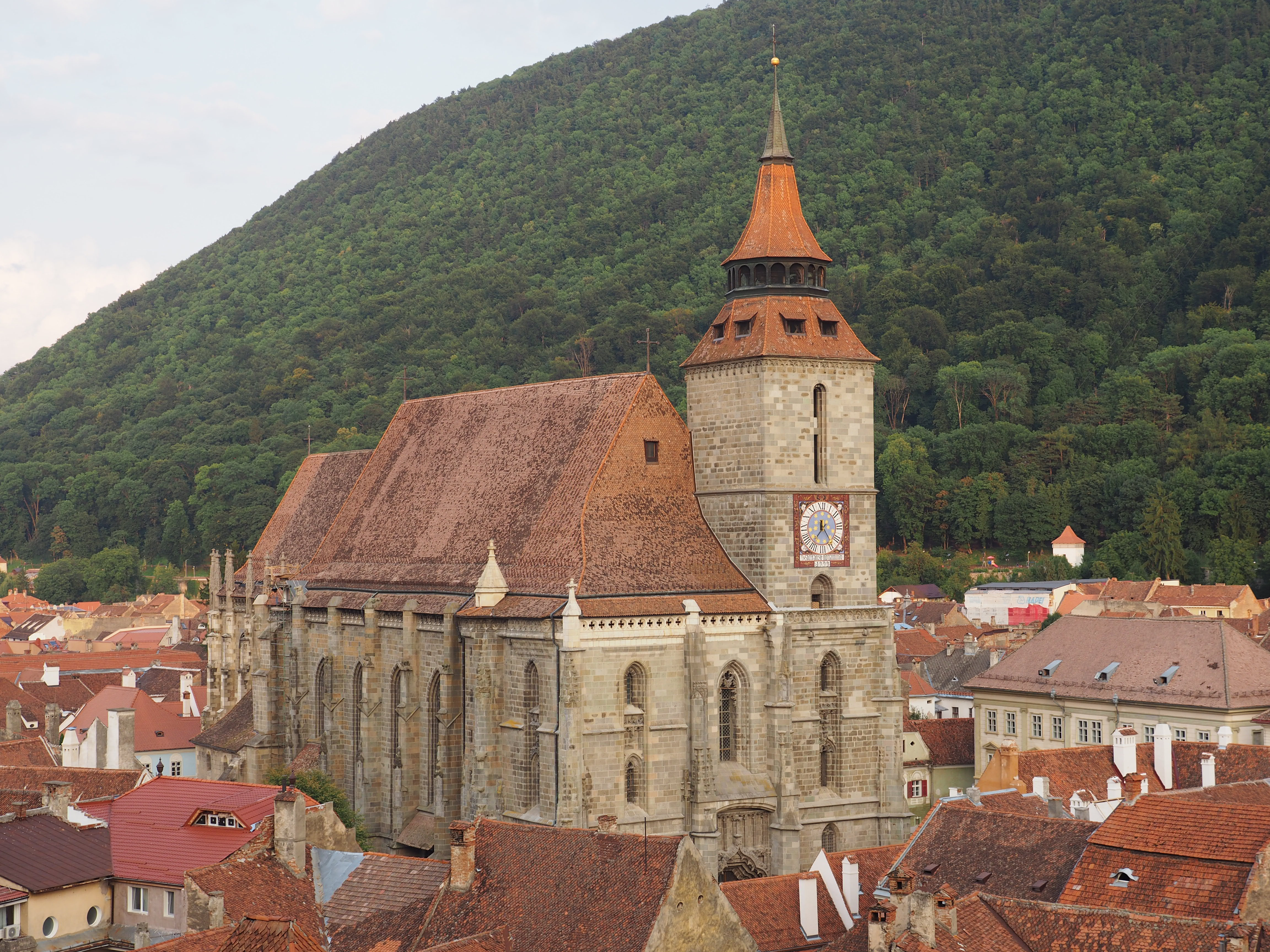
- The Black Church (2019)
- The Black Church of Romania
- Location: Brașov, Brașov County, south-eastern Transylvania
- Country: Romania
- Denomination: Lutheran
- Previous denomination: Roman Catholic
- Website: https://bisericaneagra.ro/

History
- Dedication: Saint Mary

Architecture
- Style: Late Gothic
- Groundbreaking: 1383
- Completed: 1476

Administration
- Province: Transylvania

The Black Church (Romanian: Biserica Neagră, German: Die Schwarze Kirche, Hungarian: Fekete templom), stands in the city of Brașov in south-eastern Transylvania, Romania. It was built by the local Transylvanian Saxon (German) community of the city during medieval times and represents the main Gothic-style monument in the country, as well as being the largest and one of the most important houses of worship in the region which belong to the Lutheran, i.e., Evangelical Church of Augustan Confession in Romania.

Author Judit Petki contends that, contrary to a widely held view, the Black Church received its dark appearance not as a result of the fire which affected much of the city in 1689, but only in recent times due to pollution. The current popular name is apparently a 19th-century creation.

The cathedral, a working church, is the main city landmark of historical Brașov, and a museum is open to visitors.

== Name ==
Petki calls the view that the Black Church got its name because it was sooted by the 1689 Brașov fire, a misconception. She bases her view on 21st-century studies, which have found no evidence of fire destruction; the church has blackened simply because of environmental pollution after Brașov has turned into an industrial city in the 19th century. Furthermore, the name "Black Church" was not used until the end of the 19th century.

== History ==
=== Construction ===
The originally Roman Catholic structure was known as the Church of Saint Mary, replacing an older building used for the same purpose. Construction on it began during the late 14th century, at an unknown date; analysis of related evidence has led several researchers to conclude that work began between 1383 and 1385, employing Bulgarian workers and craftsmen who proceeded to establish the Brașov Bulgarian colony in Șcheii Brașovului. According to popular legend, a German child was disturbing the Bulgarian builders or told them that one of the walls was leaning. An annoyed Bulgarian pushed the child off the church tower and then immured his corpse in the church to conceal his crime.

It is known that, in its first stages, the building was serviced by a priest named Thomas (died 1410), whose grave is located in the choir area. Work on the fortifications in the surrounding area probably began at the same time as work on the church, leading in time to the completion of Brașov's third citadel.

Its chancel originally featured a single column, but its role in supporting the entire central structure—on the model of German cathedrals built by Hans Stettheimer (a view expressed by researchers such as Ernst Kühlbrandt and Antal Hekler) is under dispute. The nave and aisles took longer to complete, and construction was interrupted for various intervals: in 1423, Pope Martin V issued an indulgence for people involved in construction, as a means to reactivate the site; in 1474, a document issued by Sixtus IV acknowledged that work was still lagging.

Several octagonal pillars, redesigned at least once during the building process, were probably completed around 1444. One of them features the inlaid crest of military leader John Hunyadi, who is mentioned among the church benefactors. The most intense work took place before and after 1450, and involved completing the exceptionally large number of portals, including the northern "Golden Gate" and its adjacent altar of the Holy Sacrifice. The eastern portal, commissioned by the Hungarian King Matthias Corvinus, was completed in 1476. The vestry was enlarged at some point between 1500 and 1515.

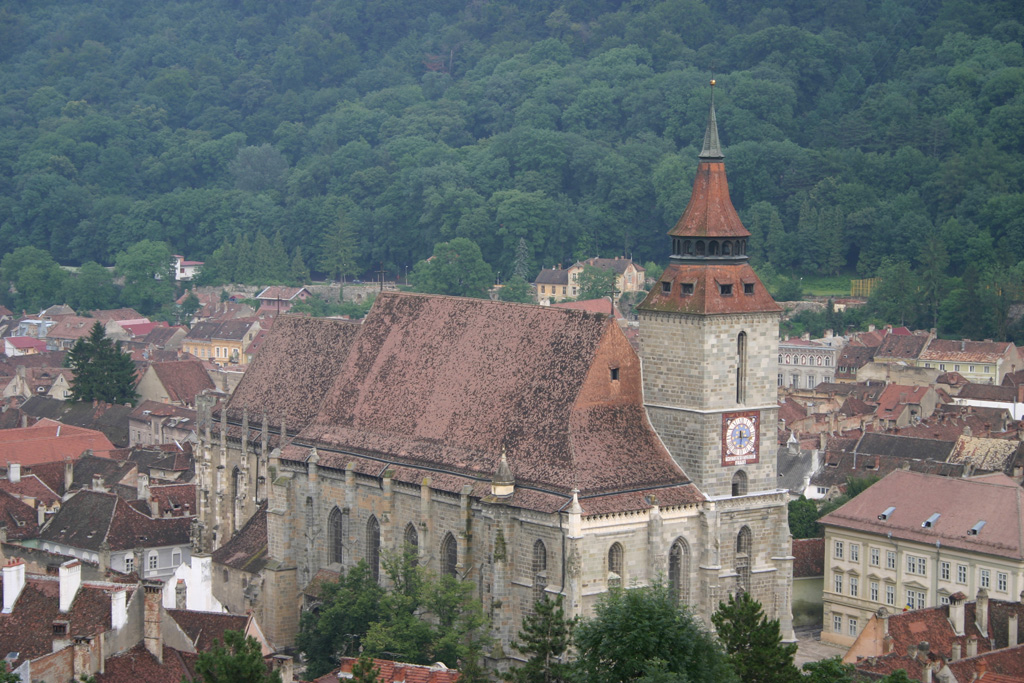
The Black Church in summer

=== Style and shape in historical context ===
Completed during the 15th century (soon after 1476), the church belongs to the final stages of Gothic architecture. The result was a three-nave basilica, all the same height, that is: a "hall church", as was preferred during the 15th and 16th centuries in the German lands, where most of the architects and masons originated. Many parts of the building show similarities with the church in Sebeș and St. Michael Church of Cluj-Napoca, as well as with the Dominikánsky kostol in Košice. The design was itself an inspiration for other religious buildings in the region, and it is possible that a stonemason originally employed on the site later worked on the church in Ghimbav.

=== Reformation ===
The Catholic services were replaced with Lutheran ones during the Protestant Reformation, coinciding with the influence exercised by Johannes Honter (1498–1549). His statue of the reformer was erected by Harro Magnussen (1861–1908) on the southern side of the building. It was long thought that the church had been partially destroyed during a great fire set by invading Habsburg forces on 21 April 1689 (during the Great Turkish War), but this theory has been proven wrong.

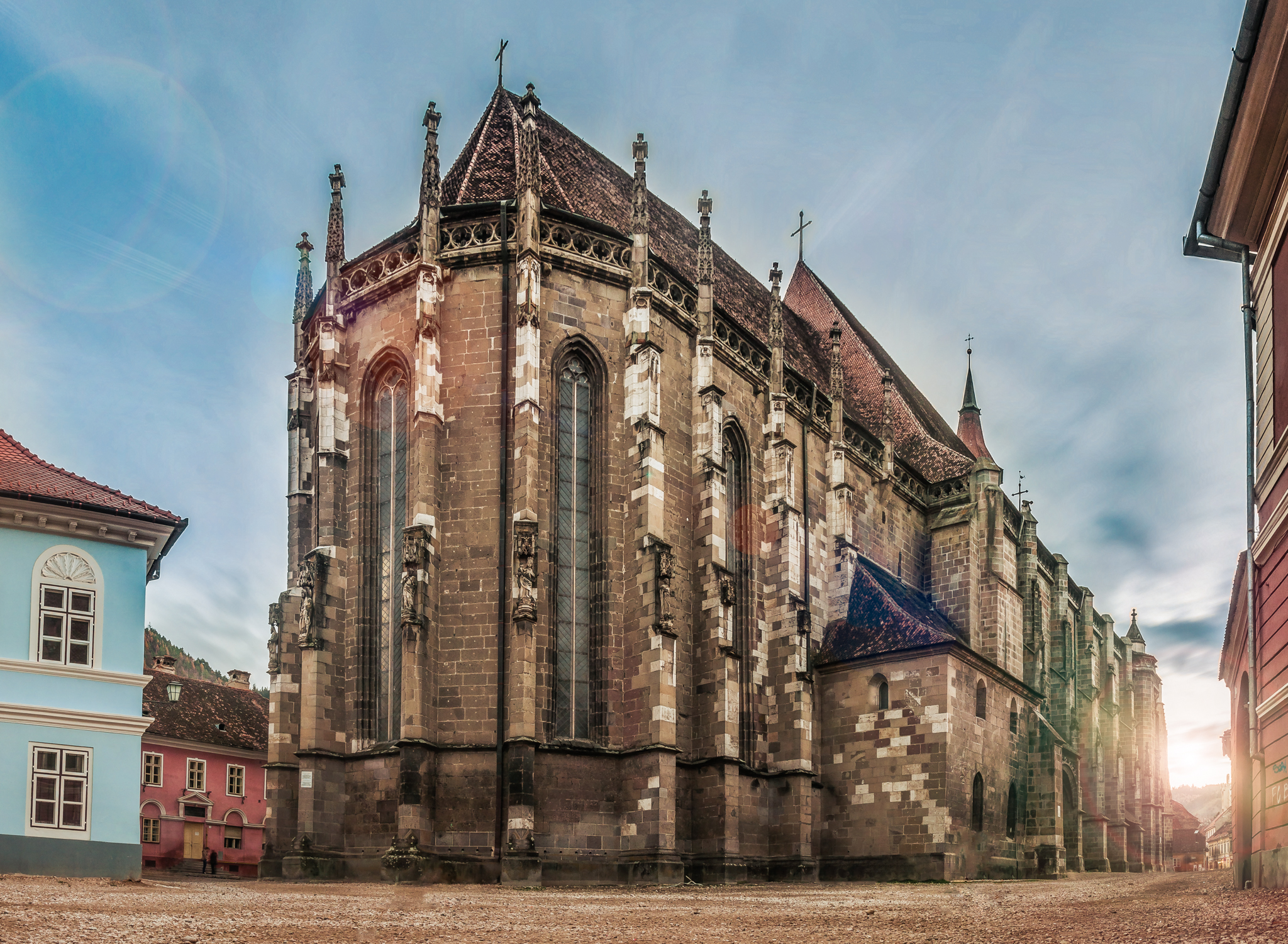
The Black Church (2014, before restoration)

=== Later work ===
A large part of the inner structure was modified during the 18th century, breaking with the original design.

The explanation that the church had to be repaired following the fire of 1689 has been discarded, but it was modified with the help of masons coming from Danzig, as local craftsmen had not mastered the craft of completing the enormous vaults; these were to be completed in Baroque style.

=== Restoration ===
From the years, 1937 and 2000, the Black Church was restored and the intellectual elite of the Transylvanian Saxons were able to carry out a substantial program of restoration of this portion of their historic heritage despite unfavorable political contexts. By doing so, they were able to preserve the forms of solidarity that were unique to their community and complete the work.

== Features ==
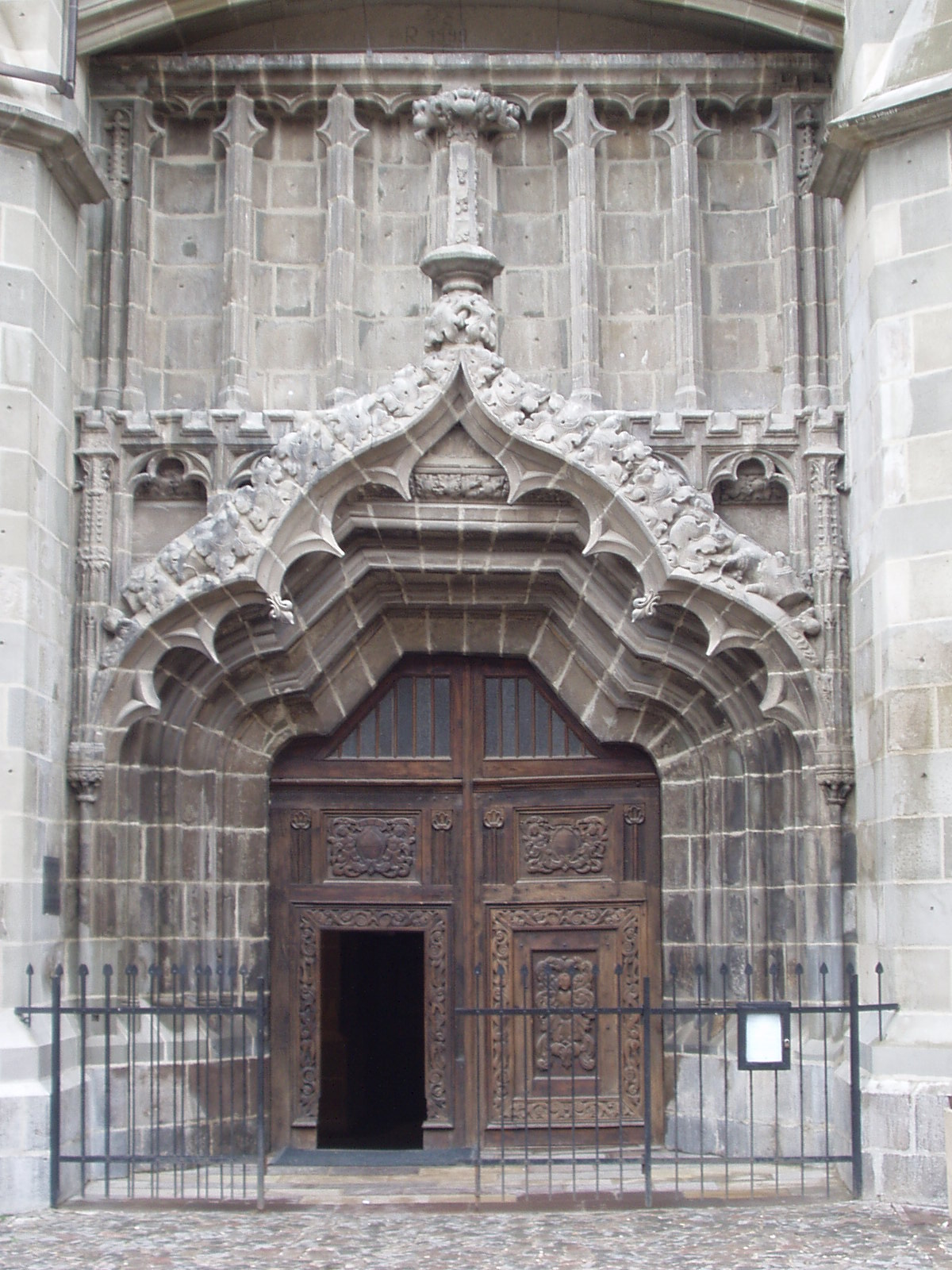
Entrance to the Black Church

=== Size ===
The Black Church is 89 meters long and 38 meters wide. It measures 21 meters from the floor level to the top of its walls, 42 meters to the ridge of the roof, and 65 meters to the highest point of its only bell tower.

=== Sculpture ===
Much of the outside structure was built in friable grit, which caused outer sculptures and masonry elements to deteriorate with time. The oldest features surviving include several sculptures, arches, simpler masonry patterns such as trilobes, as well as numerous portals, while the crowning is imitation Gothic dating from the 18th century.

The oldest sculpture appears to be the almost completely deteriorated bust of John the Baptist; it is located in the choir section and reflects the Bohemian Gothic art as seen in the works of Johann and Peter Parler. A more flamboyant Gothic style was used in the outside sculptures — those probably depicting the church's supposed founder, Thomas, and the Catholic patron saint of Transylvania, Nicholas. Other pieces in that style include the Nativity, Salvator Mundi, an archangel, as well as depictions of saints believed to be the Four Evangelists (probably completed in various stages between 1430 and 1450). Newer medieval sculptures, created after 1450 and showing some Renaissance influences, feature the northward bas-relief depicting Jesus Christ in the Temple of Jerusalem, as well as various figures on the same facade. The statue of Mary and Jesus faces towards the old city hall and stands above the coat of arms of Kronstadt (Brașov), as the Virgin Mary is the patron of the city.

The twelve statues seen today on the choir buttresses are copies created by local artists and placed there in 1937–1944, when the badly weathered 15th-century originals were moved inside the church, where they are still on display. The copies are themselves seriously affected by the intensifying air pollution, five of them having been restored between 2018 and the summer of 2021.

=== Murals ===
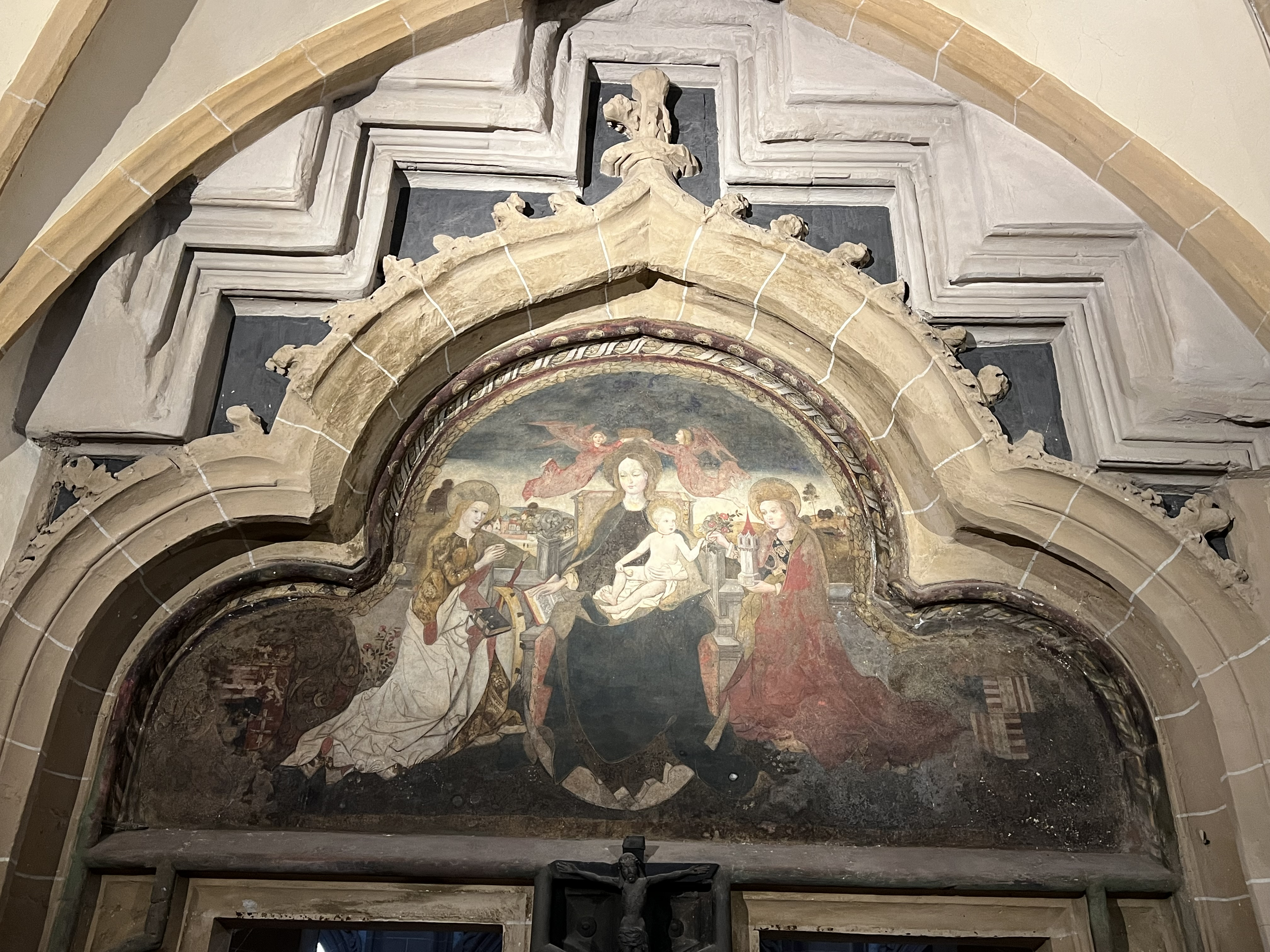
The Nativity mural from the end of the 15th century shows, in the corners, the emblems of Hungarian king Matthias Corvinus (left) and his wife Beatrix of Aragon (right).

A partly destroyed mural, which appears to have been completed around 1477, is situated near the southeastern portal, and features the coat of arms of Matthias Corvinus and his wife Beatrice. It shows the Nativity, together with depictions of Saint Catherine and Saint Barbara. Unlike the inner Annunciation mural, which is late Gothic, the outside painting is heavily influenced by the Renaissance.

=== Bell, organ, carpets, valuable items ===
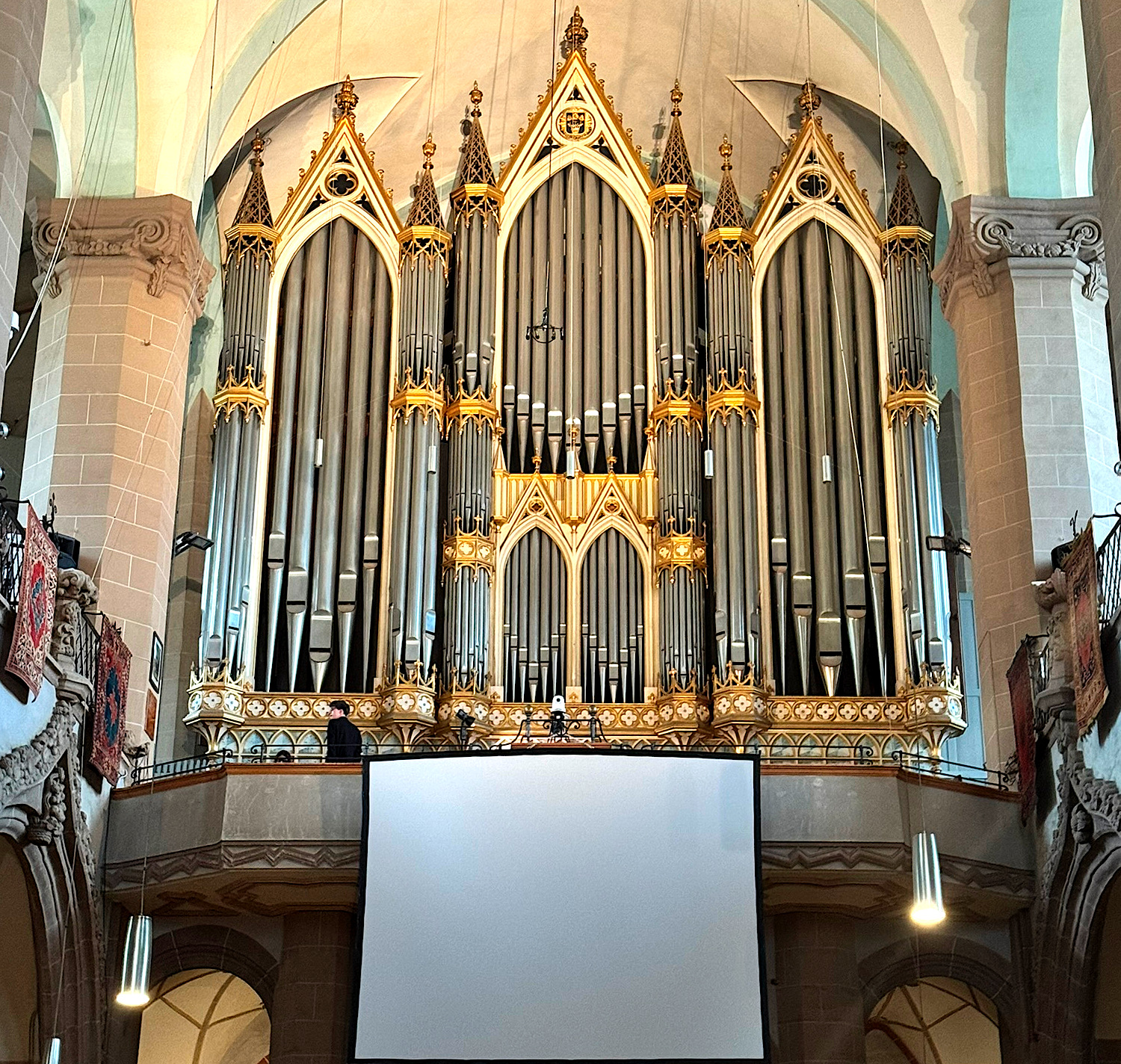
Buchholz organ, with Transylvanian rugs

The Black Church has three bells, the largest weighing 6.3 tonnes, which, as of 2019, made it the biggest in Romania. (It has since been surpassed in Romania by the main bell in the National Cathedral (the largest orthodox cathedral in the world, completed October 2025 - nearly 15 years after groundbreaking) in Bucharest, and this bell, which is the largest free-swinging church bell in the world, is 25,190 kgs, or over 17.5 tons - or over two times the size of Biserica Neagră's bell, although there is currently no mention on the National Cathedral's article page of there being an organ within that church.) The larger of the two organs, boasting an impressive 4,000 pipes, was built in 1839 by Carl August Buchholz and is played during weekly concerts. The Buchholz organ has four manual consoles with 63 sounding stops; it is the largest mechanical instrument in Romania, as well as the largest organ built by Buchholz.

Of its rich collection of Transylvanian rugs, donated between the 15th and 17th centuries by Transylvanian Saxon merchants, some have been used to decorate walls as well as floors after the Reformation.

The church also features a cast iron tabernacle in Gothic style, a baptismal font completed in 1472 and donated by a merchant named Johannes Rewdel, two large chalices (both dated around 1504) and several brocade chasubles (created between in the late 15th and mid-16th centuries).

== Gallery ==
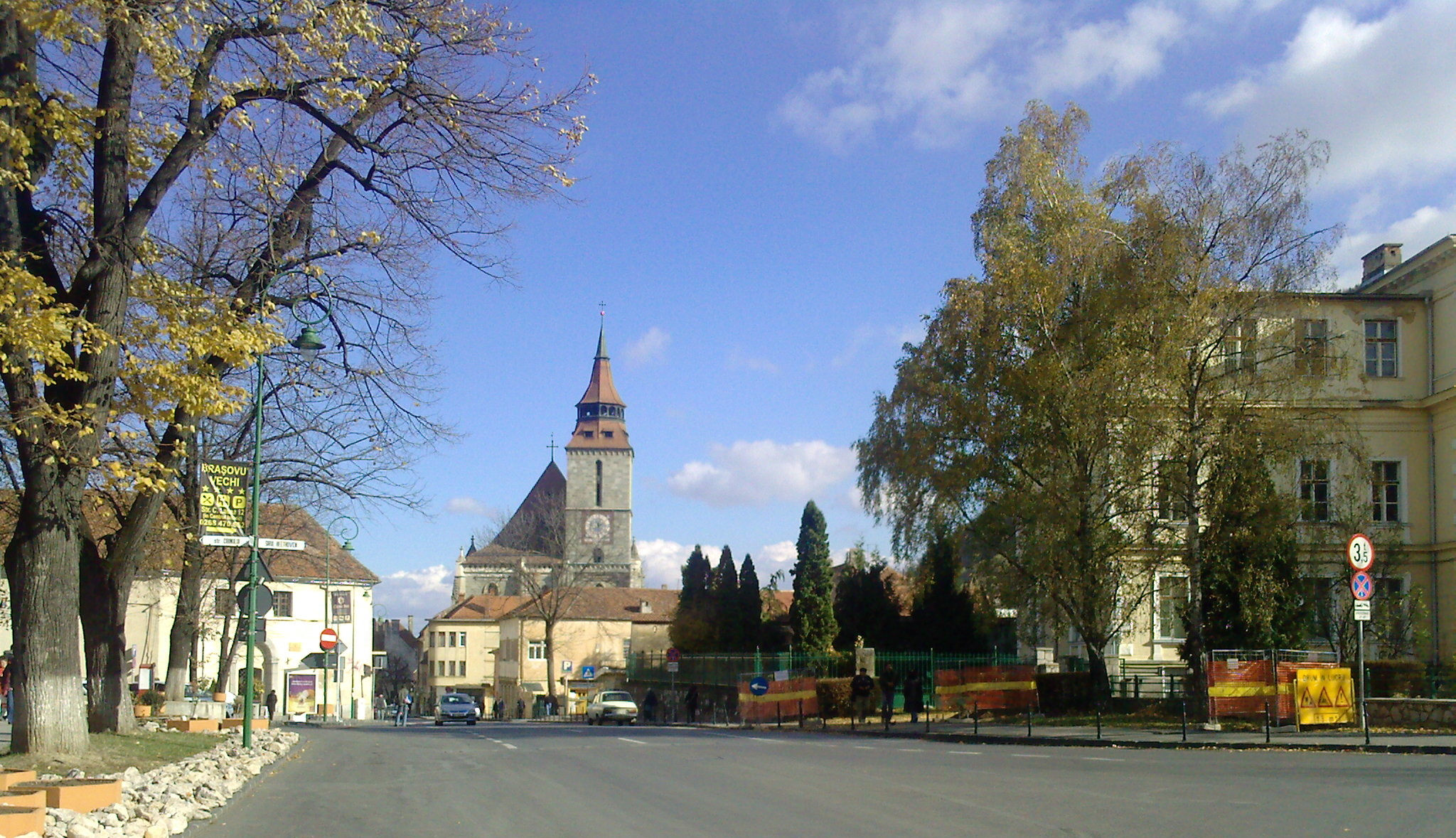
Brașov, Black Church in the background

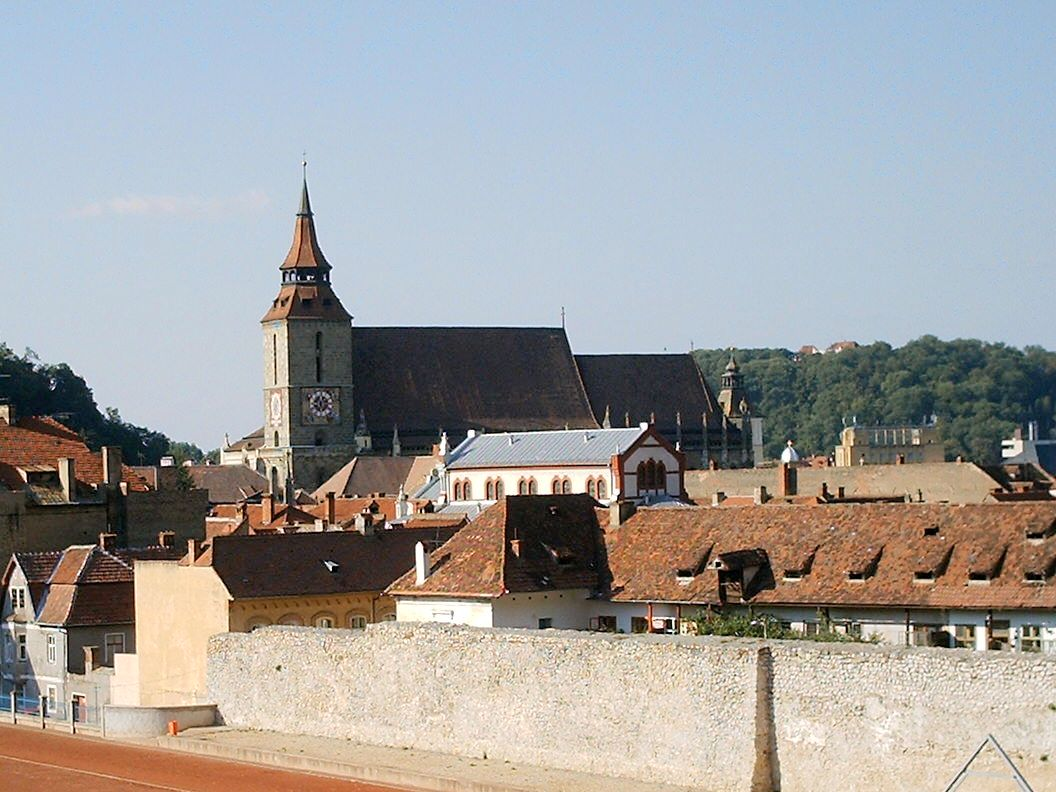
The church and its surroundings

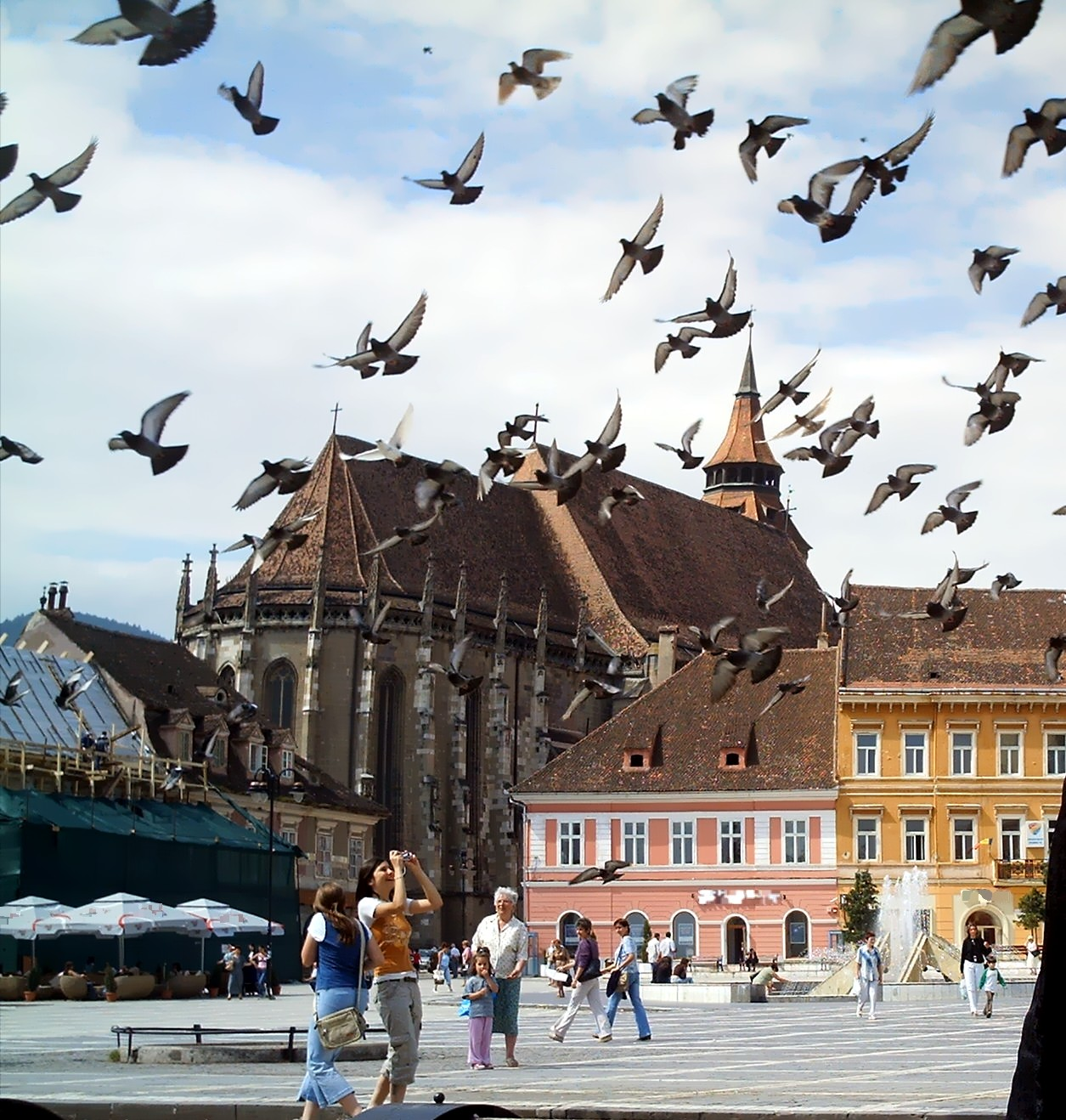
Council Square and the Black Church

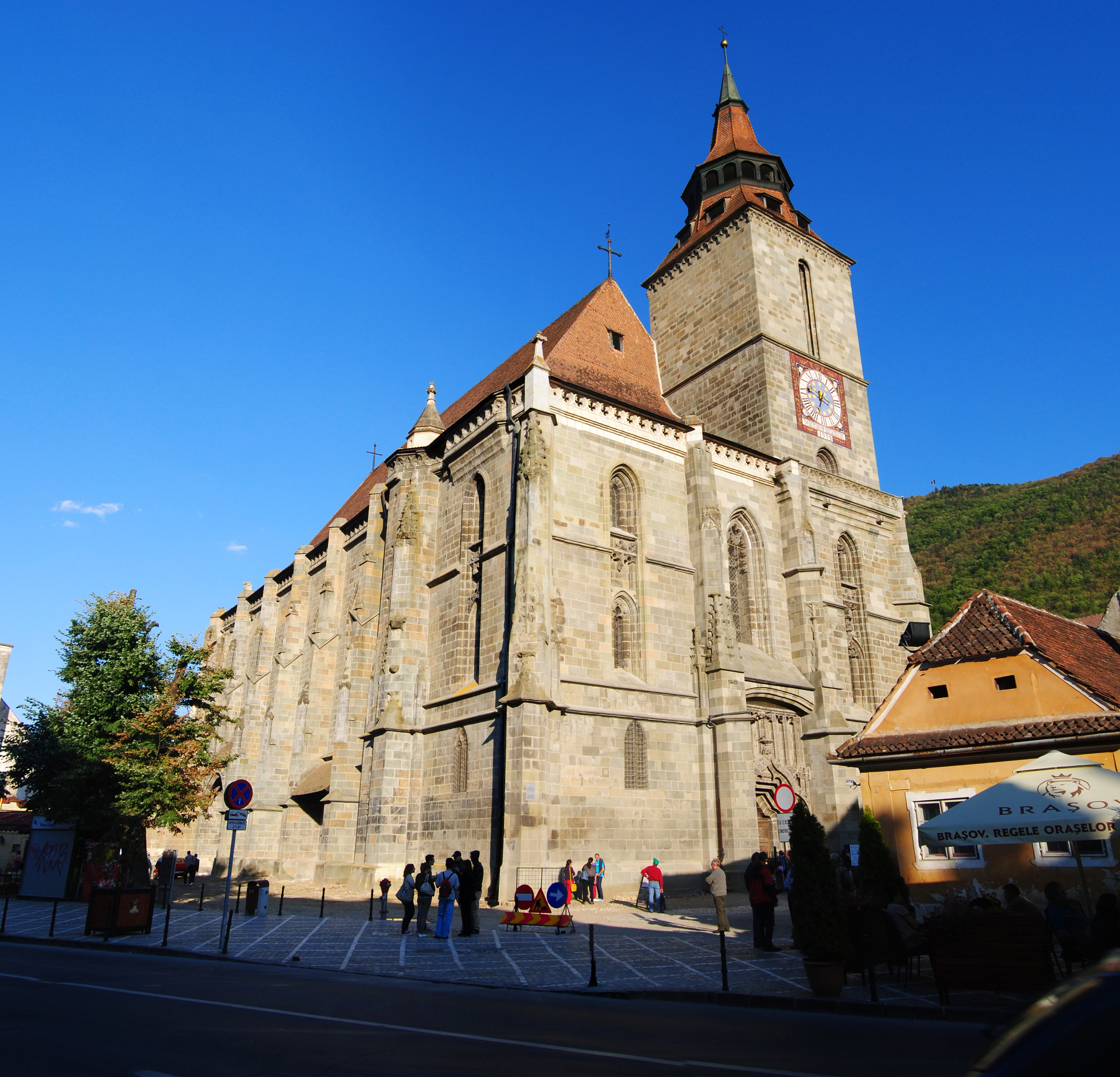
Northern and western facades

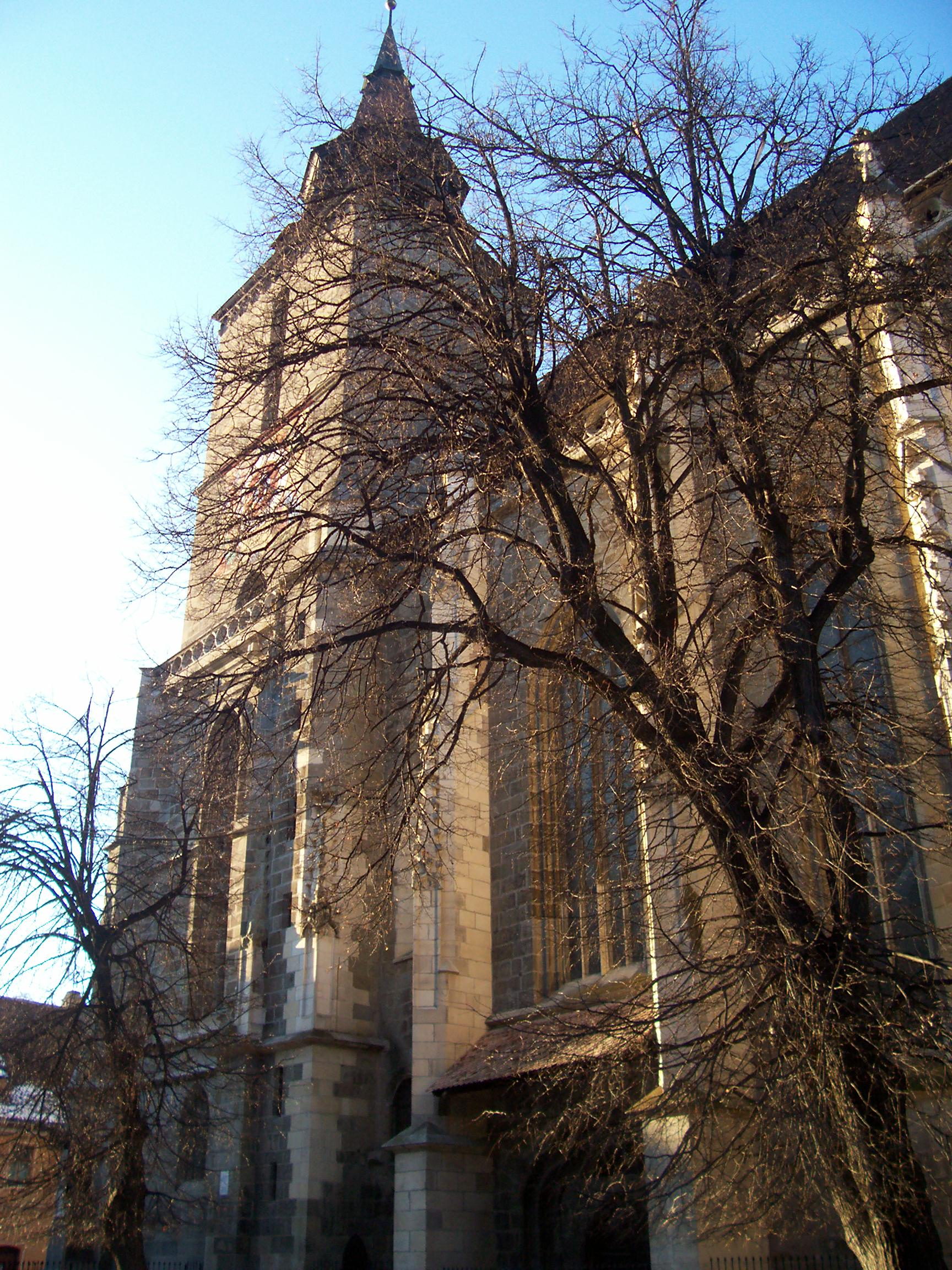
Southwest corner with bell tower

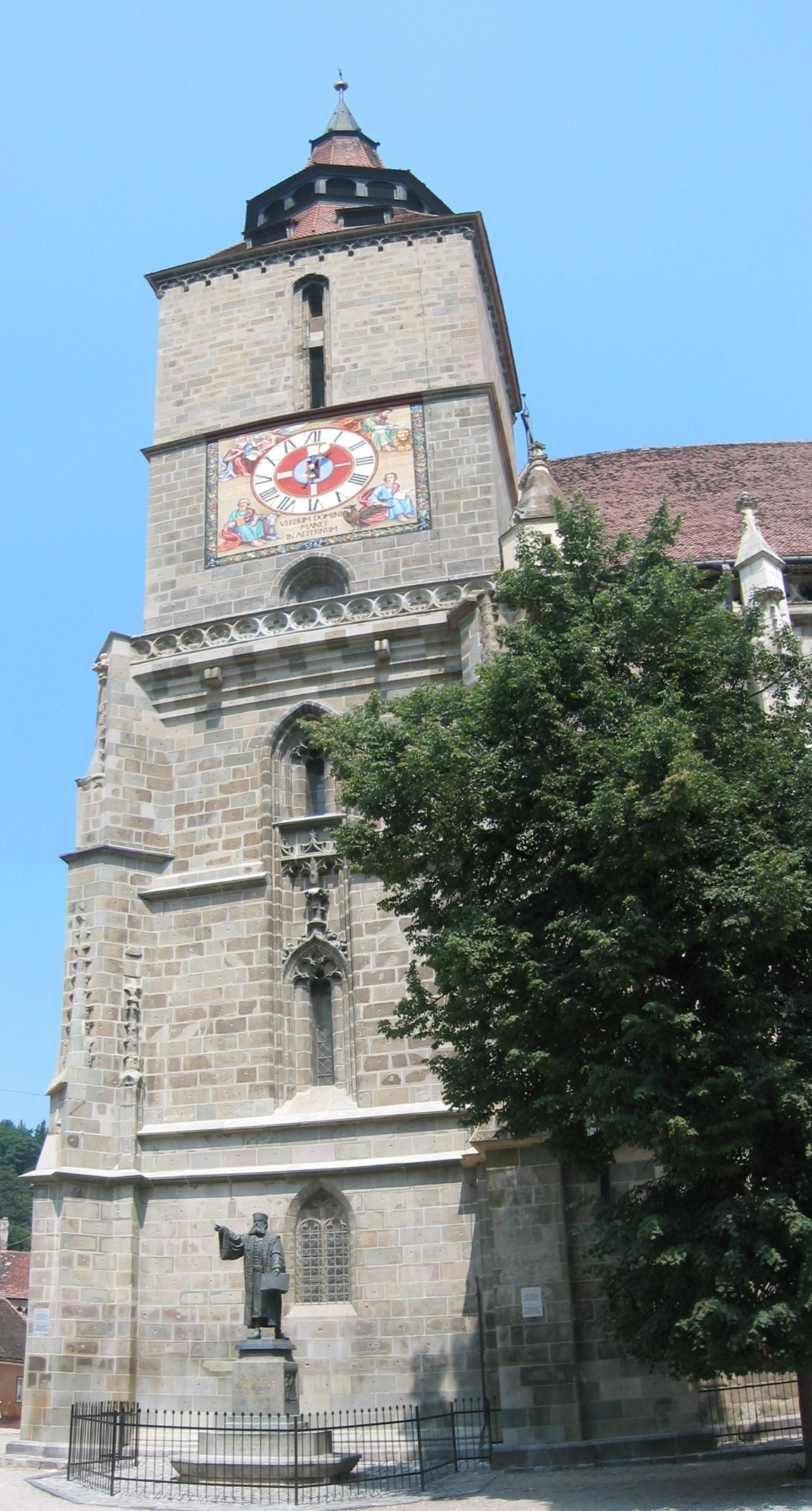
Statue of Johannes Honter in front of the bell tower

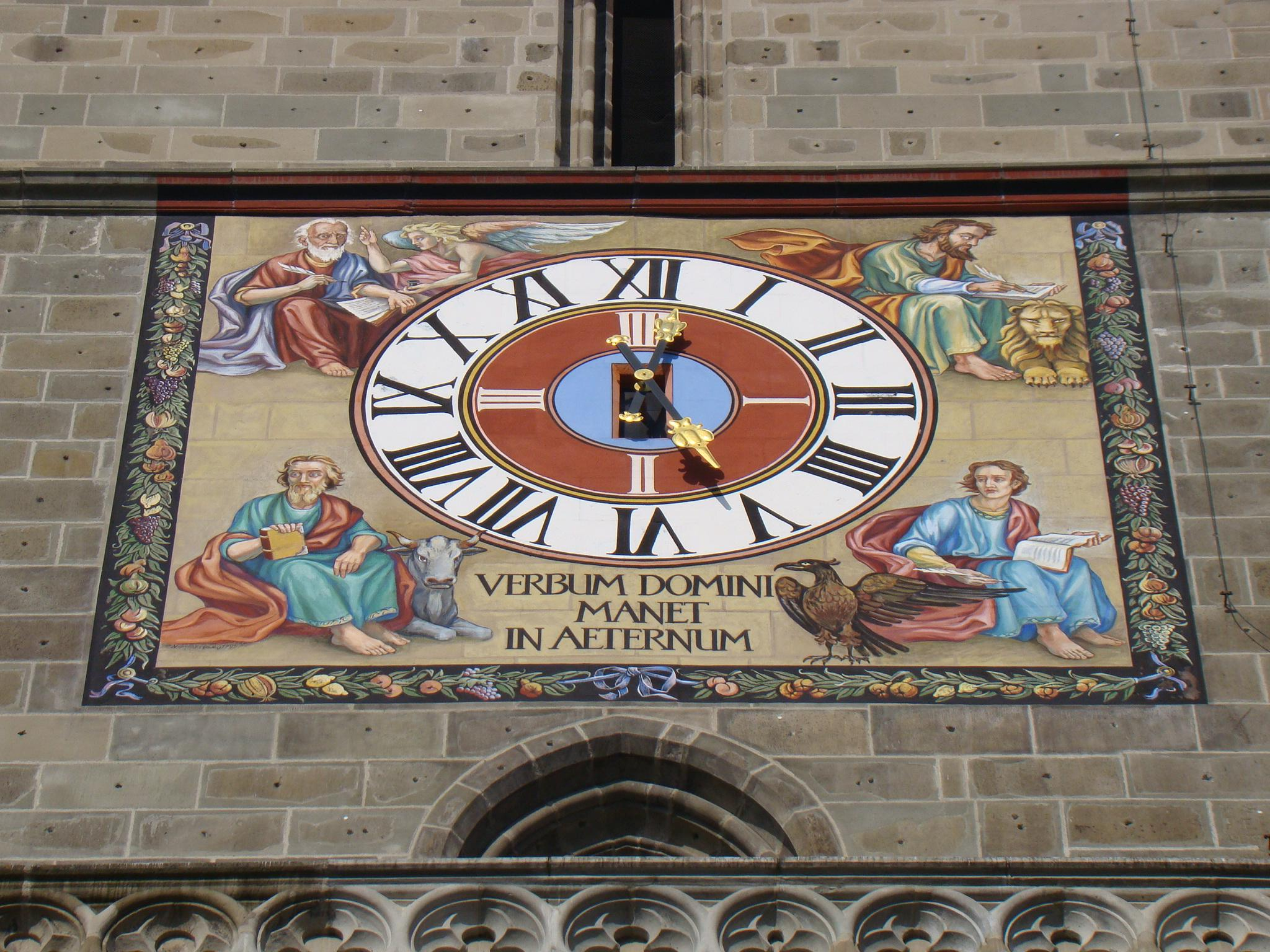
The southern clock face with the Four Evangelists

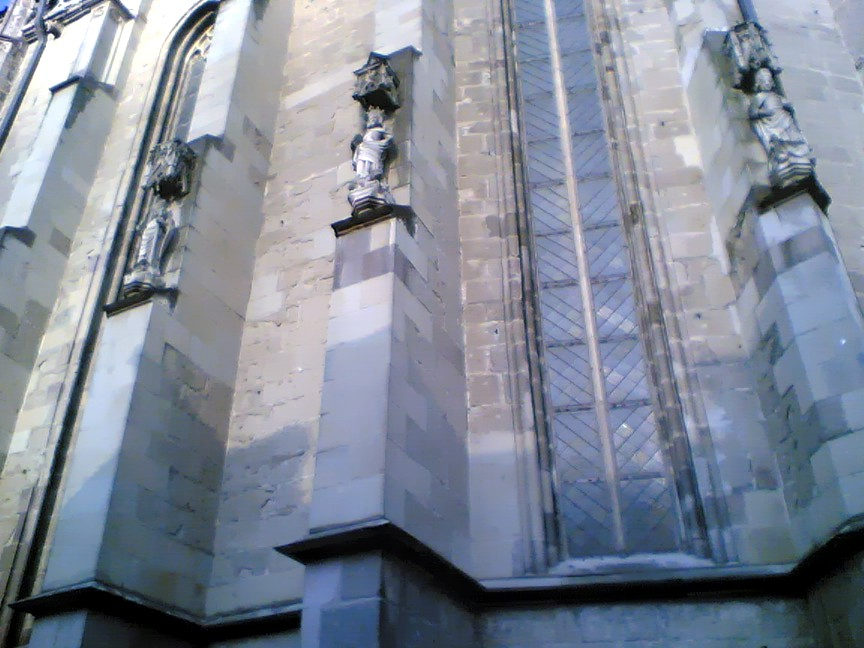
Outside sculptures (southern part of the apse)

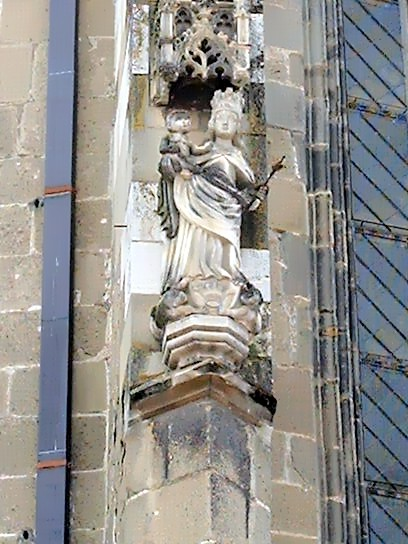
Mary and Jesus (outside sculpture)

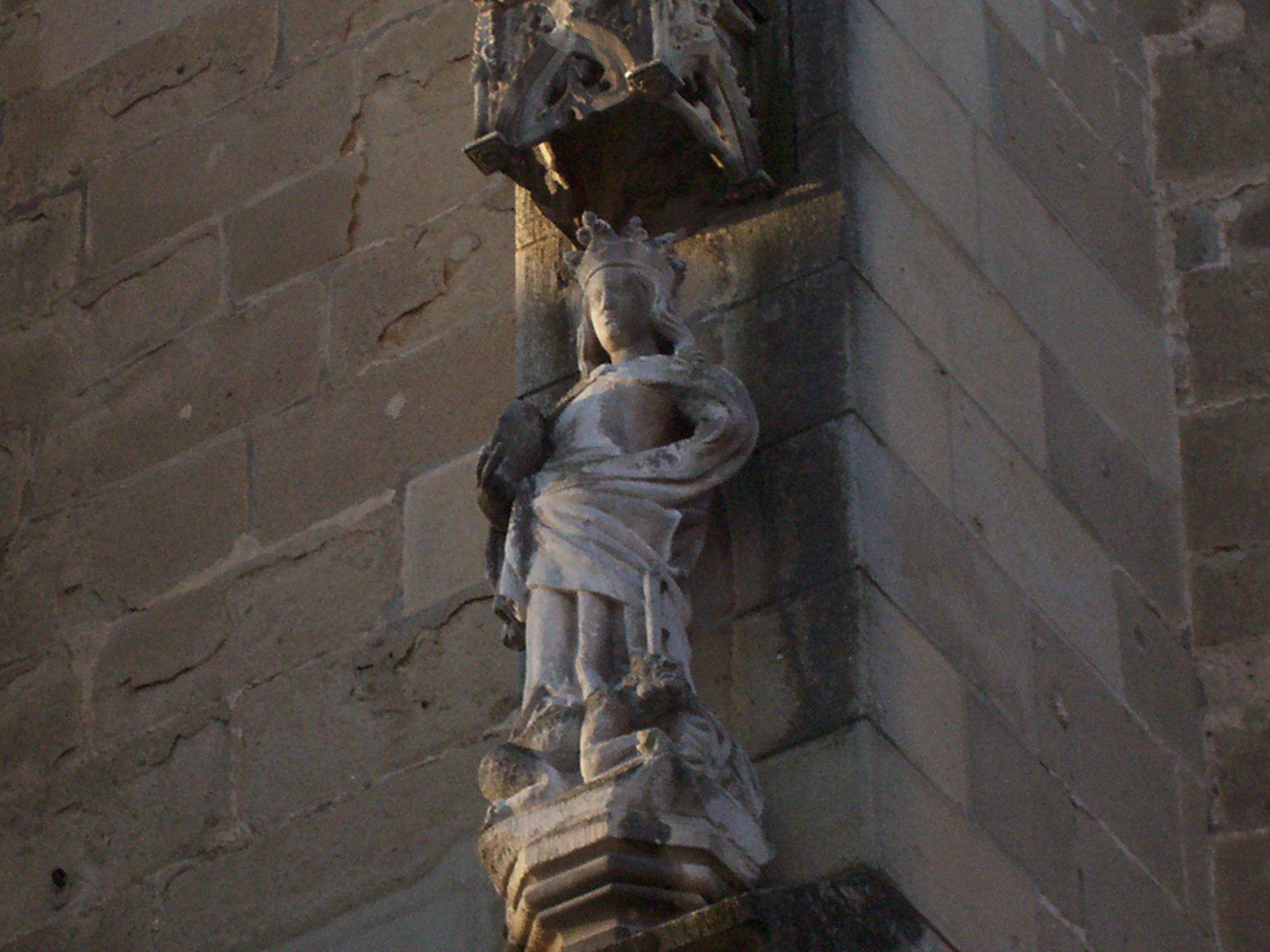
Statue of St. Catherine on a buttress

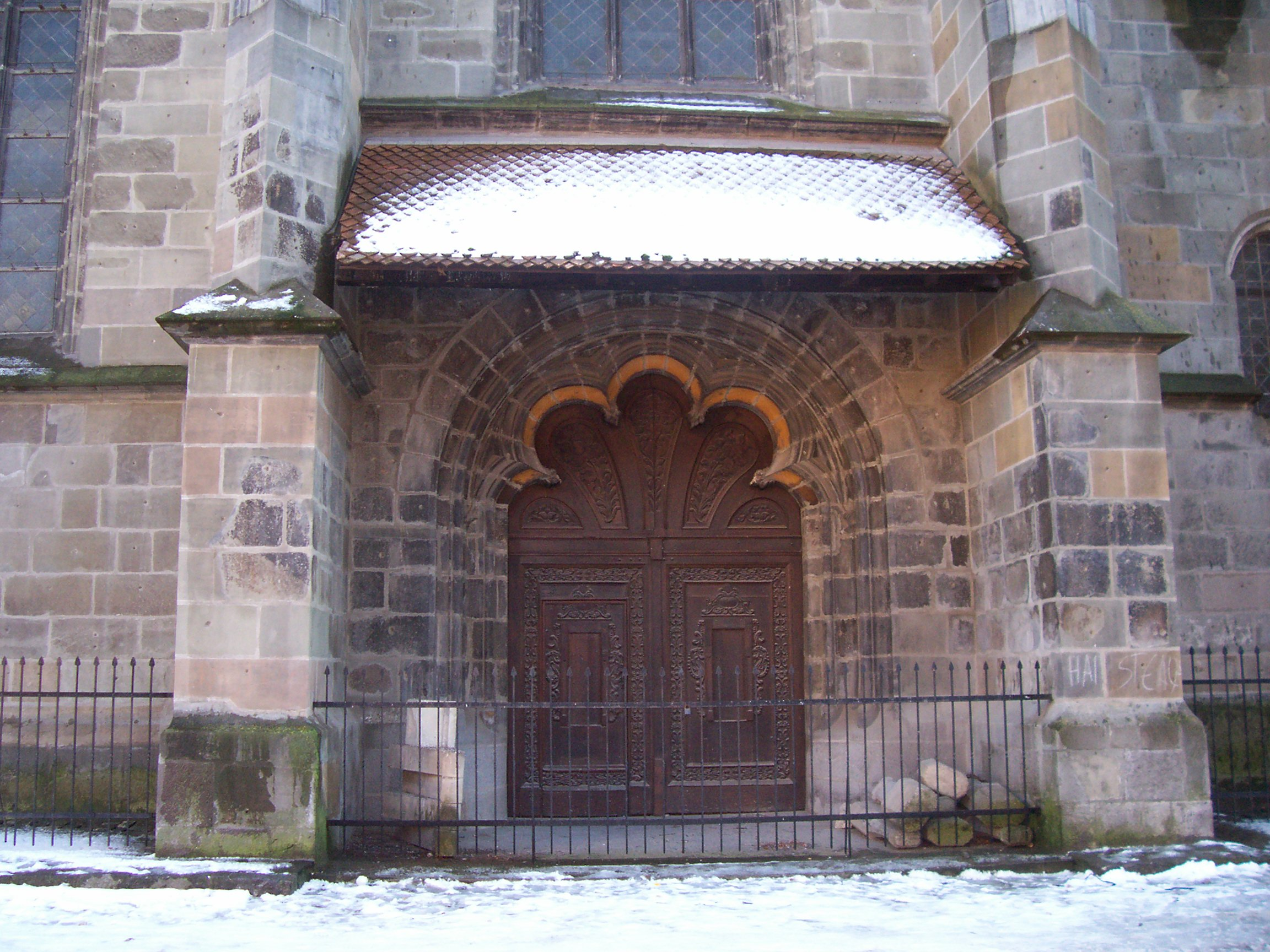
The "Golden Gate"

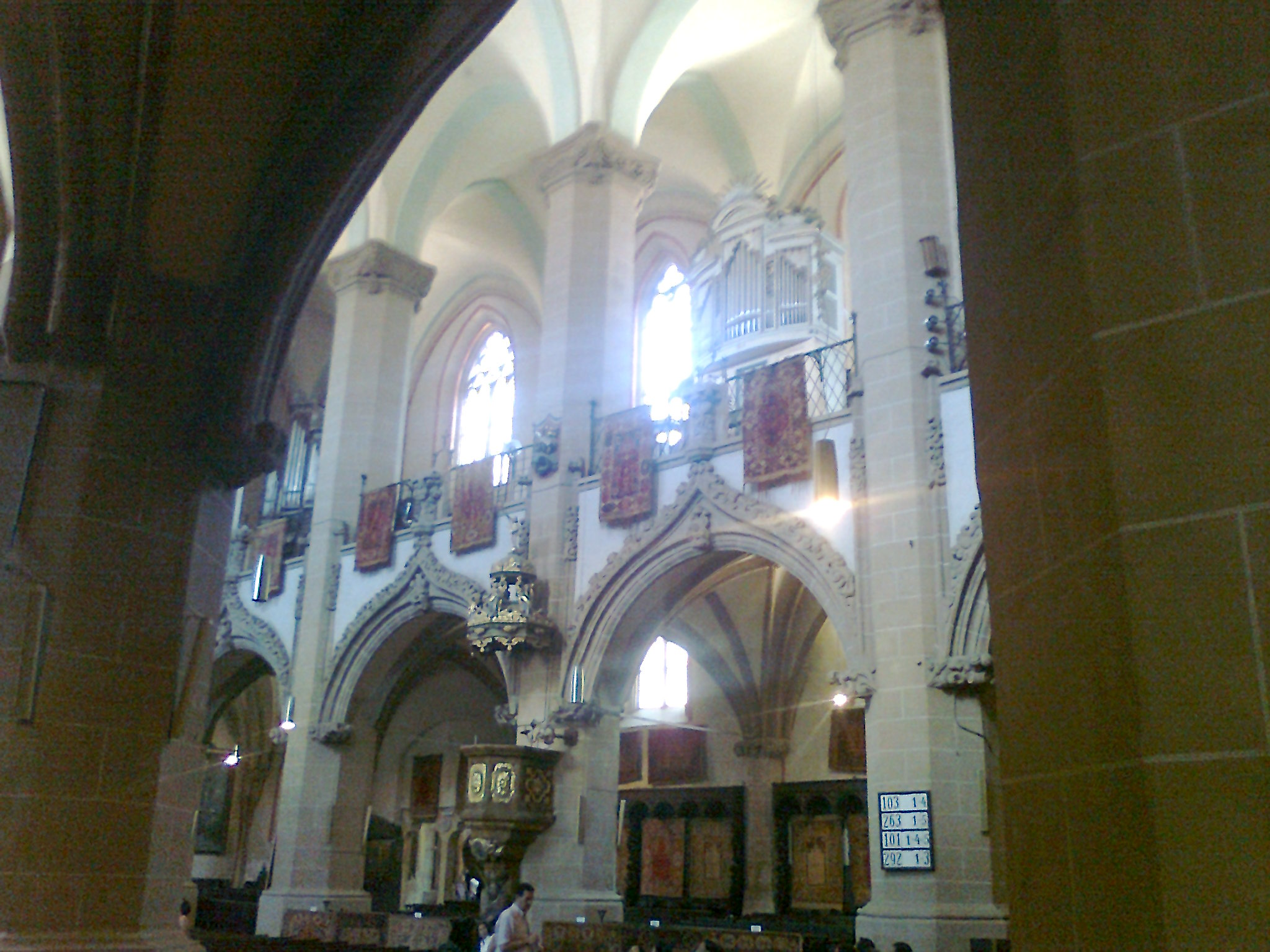
Interior with rugs

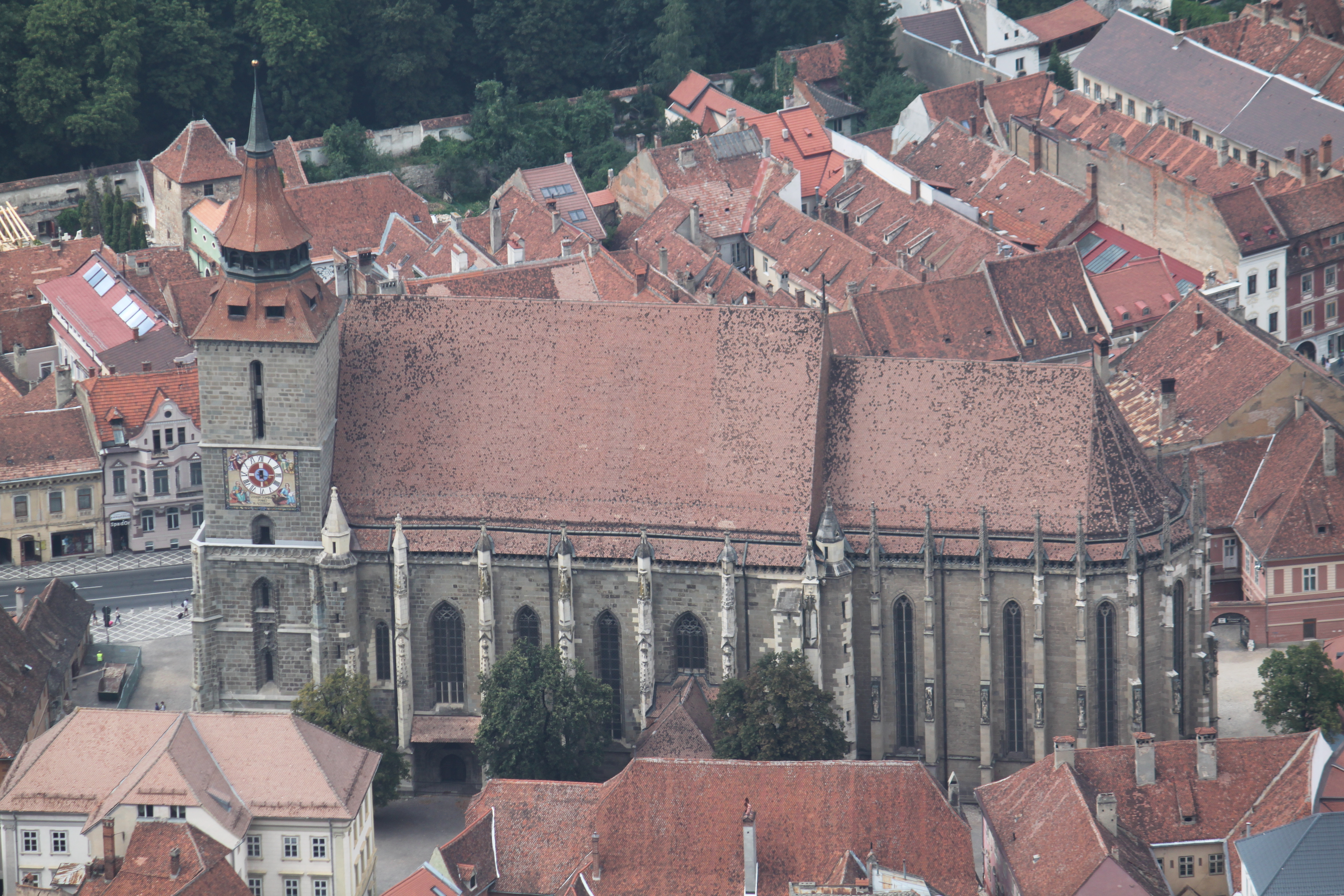
View of the church from the Tâmpa mountain

== Activities ==
The church website is regularly updated.

A Lutheran service is held each Sunday for the small German community in the city.

The church contains a museum and is open to visitors. The Anatolian carpets, which together constitute the largest collection of "Transylvanian rugs", are preserved in their historical locations throughout the church.

The public can attend organ concerts, on a regular basis and as part of musical events.

== See also ==
- List of Gothic Cathedrals in Europe

== Bibliography ==
- Balkanski, Todor (1996). "Окръг Брашов" ('Brașov County'), in Трансилванските (седмиградските) българи. Етнос. Език. Етнонимия. Ономастика. Просопографии ('The Transylvanian (seven-city [cf. Siebenbürgen#Etymology]) Bulgarians. Ethnos. Language. Ethnonymy. Onomastics. Prosopography'), IK "Znak '94", Veliko Tarnovo, p. 44. Via macedonia.kroraina.com, re-accessed 19 Oct 2021.
- Heltmann, Heinz & Servatius, Gustav (1993). Reiseführer Siebenbürgen. Wort und Welt Verlag, Thaur bei Innsbruck, p. 365.
- Kotzan, Anne (2013). Rumänien. Baedeker. p. 187. ISBN 3829714475.
- Miletich, Lyubomir (1896). "Дако-ромънитѣ и тѣхната славянска писменость. Часть II. Нови влахо-български грамоти отъ Брашовъ: Брашов и брашовските българите („шкеи”, bolgárszeg)" (based on Google translation: "Daco-Romanian[s?] and their Slavic [documents?]. Part II. New Vlacho-Bulgarian diplomas from Braşov: Braşov and the Bulgarians of Braşov ("Șkei", bolgárszeg)"), in Сборникъ за Народни Умотворения, Наука и Книжнина ('Collection of Folk Tales, Science and Literature'), Vol. XIII, 1896, Sofia.
- Petki, Judit. Kulcskérdések a Nagy tűzről, 'Key questions about the Great Fire' (in Hungarian). Brassói Lapok, 5 September 2019, p. 4.
- Roth, Harald (2010). Kronstadt in Siebenbürgen – Eine kleine Stadtgeschichte. pp. 162–164, ISBN 9783412206024.
- Vătășianu, Virgil (1959). Istoria artei feudale în țările romîne ('History of feudalistic [i.e. medieval] art in the Romanian lands'), Vol. I. Editura Academiei RPR, Bucharest. OCLC 536121
- Ziegler, Ágnes; Ziegler, Frank-Thomas (2019). Gott zu Ehren und der löblichen Zunft zur Zierde und Gebrauch [In honour of God, for adornment and use by the honourable guild] (in German). Brasov. ISBN 9786068582559.
