= Petre Guran =

Romanian historian

Radu Petre Guran
- Born: March 5, 1972 (age 54); Bucharest
- Citizenship: Romania
- Education: École des Hautes Études en Sciences Sociales
- Occupation: Historian

Radu Petre Guran (born March 5, 1972) is a Romanian historian, member of the World Academy of Art and Science. In 2003, he got a Ph.D from the School for Advanced Studies in the Social Sciences. He has been the first director of the Romanian Cultural Institute "Mihai Eminescu" in Chişinău since September 2010.
