= History of Cluj-Napoca =

The history of Cluj-Napoca covers the time from the Roman conquest of Dacia, when a Roman settlement named Napoca existed on the location of the later city, through the founding of Cluj and its flourishing as the main cultural and religious center in the historical province of Transylvania, until its modern existence as a city, the seat of Cluj County in north-western Romania.

== Ancient times ==
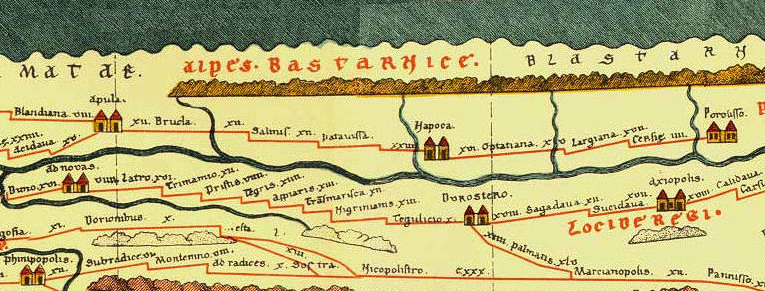
Napoca on the Roman Dacia fragment from Tabula Peutingeriana – 1–4th century AD (top upper center)

=== Etymology and origin ===
About the origin of the settlement's name Napoca or Napuca several hypotheses have been advanced. The most important are the following:

- Dacian name having the same root "nap" (cf. ancient Armenian root "nap") as that of the Dacian river Naparis attested by Herodotus, but with an augmentative suffix uk/ok i.e. over, great
- Name derived from that of the Dacianized Scythian tribe known as the Napae
- Name probably akin to an indigenous (Thracian) element in Romanian, the word năpârcă 'viper' cf. Albanian nepërkë, nepërtkë
- Name derived from the Ancient Greek term napos (νάπος), meaning "timbered valley"
- Name derived from the Indo-European root *snā-p- (Pokorny 971-2), "to flow, to swim, damp".

Independent of these hypotheses, scholars agree that the name of the settlement predates the Roman conquest (AD 106).

=== Pre-Roman times ===
The oldest human settlement near Cluj, dating from the Neolithic Age, is at Gura Baciului, near Suceagu, in the valley of a tributary of the Nadăș river and nearby the Hoia Forest. Traces of the Thracian-Dacians and Celts suggest that the region was occupied intermittently throughout the Bronze and Iron Ages.

As economies centered around cattle-raising developed in the Pannonian plain, the importance of the salt trade with the Transylvanian Plain became ever more important. Two major routes, one running north–south and the other east–west, met on the right end of a ford under the promontory of a hill, today named Cetățuie.

=== Roman times ===
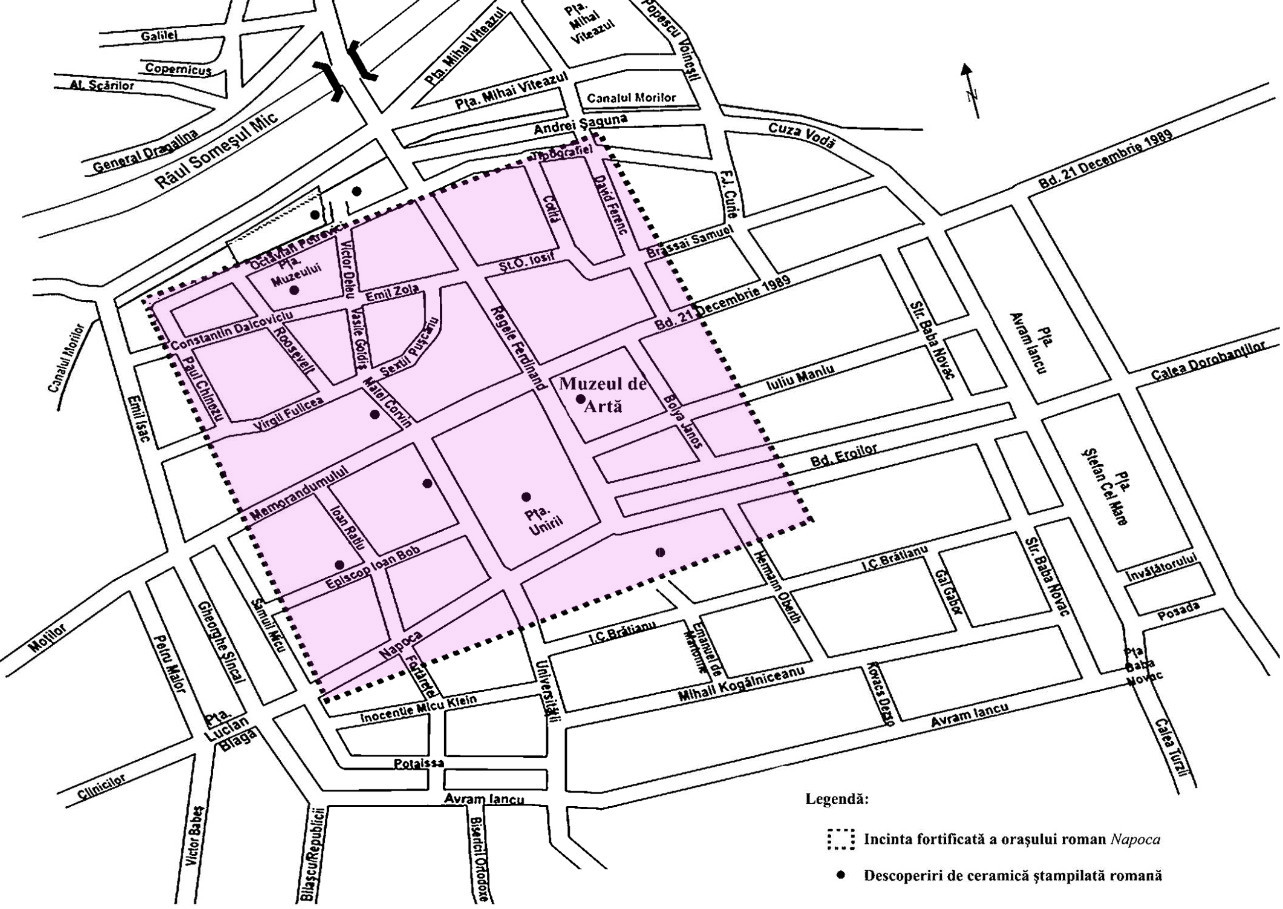
The fort of Roman city

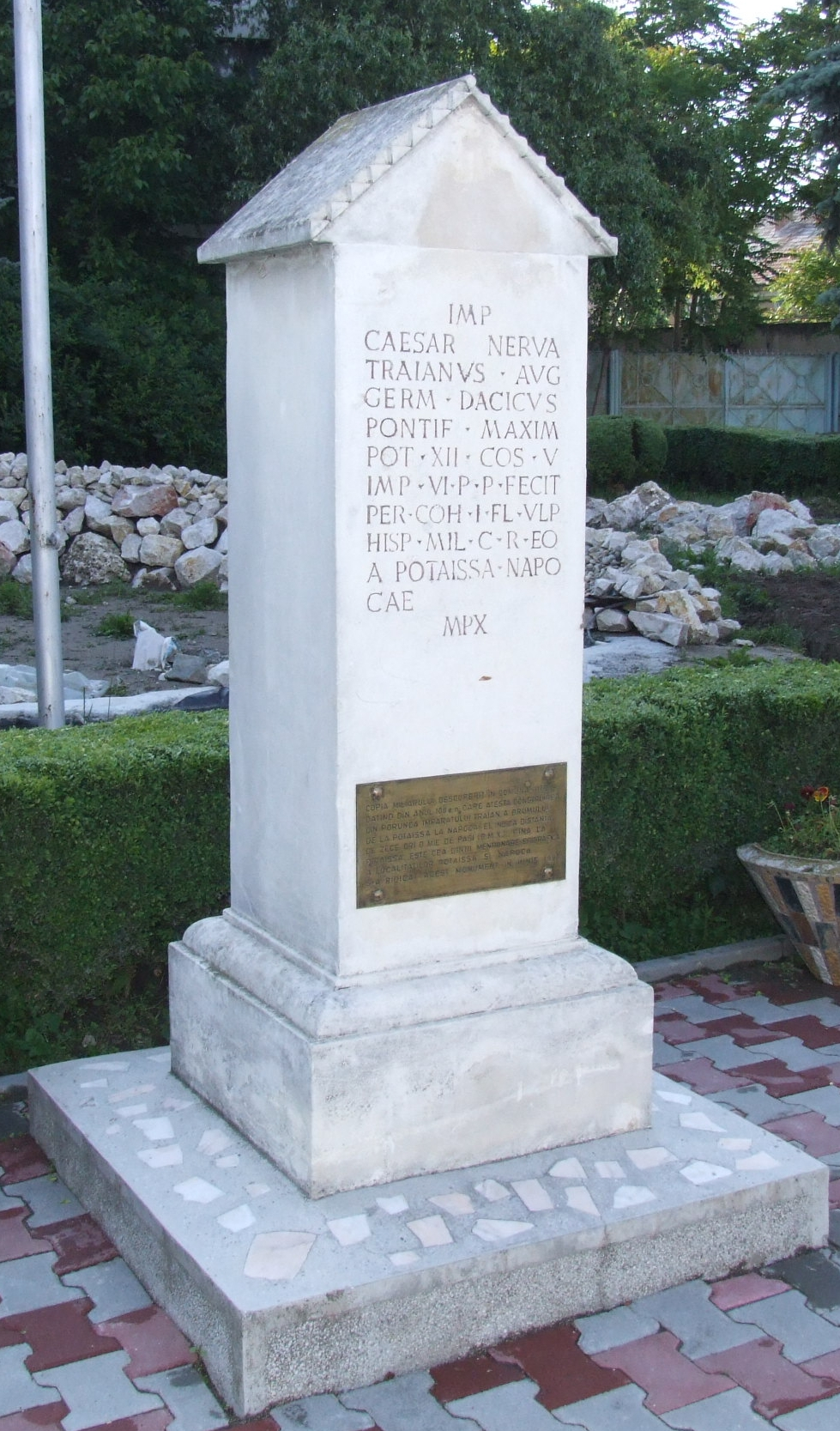
Milliarium of Aiton, the oldest known epigraphical attestation of Napoca – a copy erected in June 1993 in front of the Turda Post Office

The Romans conquered Dacia between AD 101 and 106 under Trajan, and a Roman settlement of Napoca is first recorded on a milestone found in 1758 in the nearby Aiton commune.

The Milliarium of Aiton is an ancient Roman milestone (milliarium) dating from 108 AD, shortly after the conquest, evidence of the construction of a road from Potaissa to Napoca. It indicates a distance of ten thousand feet (P.M.X.) to Potaissa. This is the first epigraphical attestation of the settlements of Potaissa and Napoca in Roman Dacia.

The complete inscription is: "Imp(erator)/ Caesar Nerva/ Traianus Aug(ustus)/ Germ(anicus) Dacicus/ pontif(ex) maxim(us)/ (sic) pot(estate) XII co(n)s(ul) V/ imp(erator) VI p(ater) p(atriae) fecit/ per coh(ortem) I Fl(aviam) Vlp(iam)/ Hisp(anam) mil(liariam) c(ivium) R(omanorum) eq(uitatam)/ a Potaissa Napo/cam / m(ilia) p(assuum) X". It was recorded in the Corpus Inscriptionum Latinarum, vol.III, the 1627, Berlin, 1863.

This milliarium is evidence of a road known to be built by Cohors I Hispanorum miliaria.

Trajan's successor Hadrian granted the title and rank of municipium to the Roman settlement at Napoca naming it municipium Aelium Hadrianum Napocenses. Later, in the 2nd century AD, the city gained the status of a colonia as Colonia Aurelia Napoca, probably during the reign of Marcus Aurelius.

Napoca became a provincial capital of Dacia Porolissensis and thus the seat of a procurator. The colonia was abandoned in 274 by the Roman administration.

The site continued to be inhabited for a period of time after the Roman administration withdrawal. The main evidence comes from two cemeteries to the south and southeast of the town containing brick and mortar or stone sarcophagi, the deceased being buried then according to Roman customs. Villages did spring up on the nearby countryside which displayed continuation in culture from the Roman period, likely populated by settlers that had abandoned the city.

== Middle Ages ==
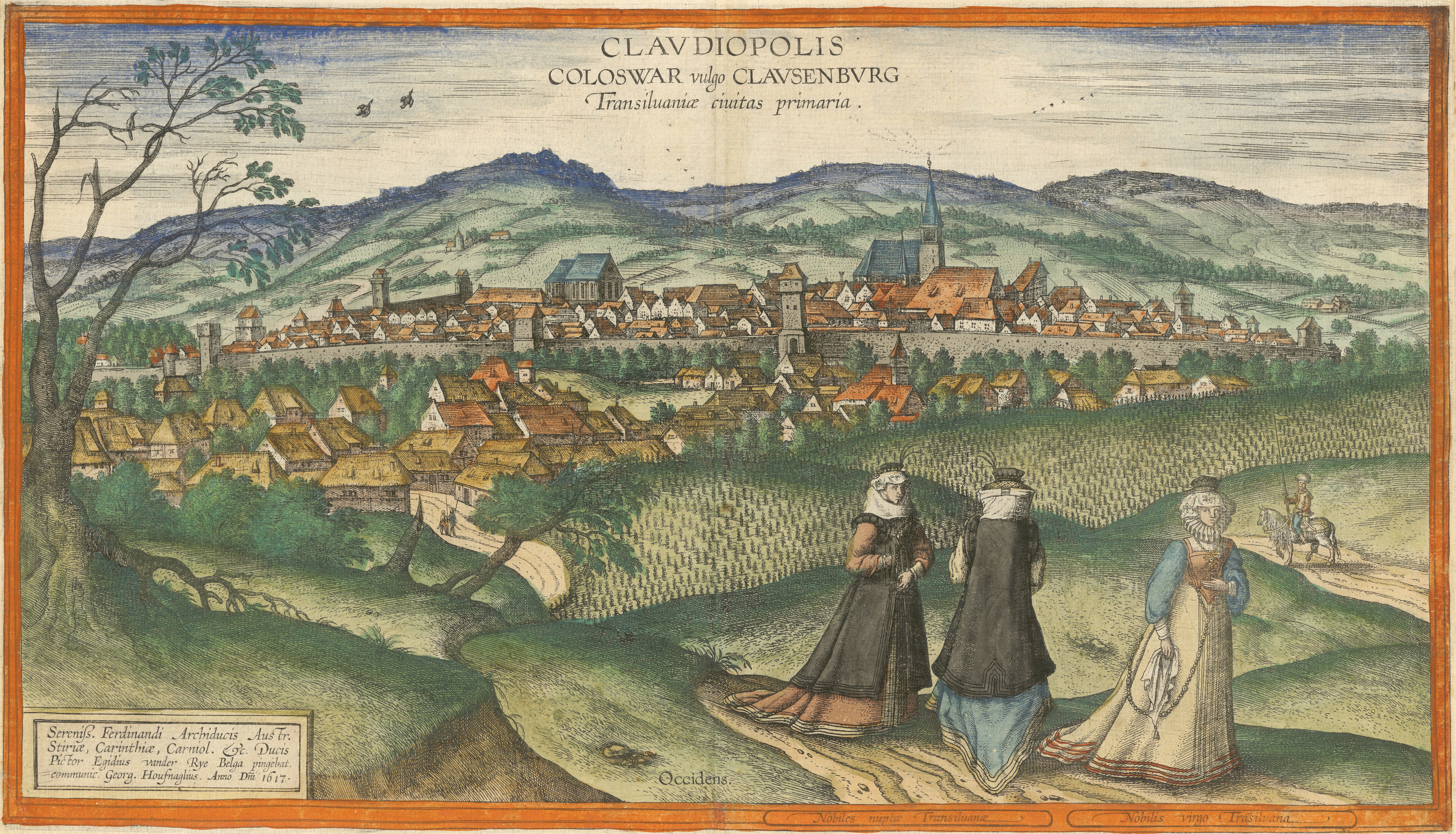
"Claudiopolis, Coloswar vulgo Clausenburg, Transilvaniæ civitas primaria". Gravure^{[a]} of medieval Cluj by Georg Houfnagel (1617)

For the most part of the Migration Period, nothing is certain about the site's history as a settlement until the Hungarians (Magyars) arrived in Pannonia in the 9th century. The modern city of Cluj-Napoca was founded by German settlers as Klausenburg in the 13th century. The name "Napoca" was added to the traditional Romanian city name "Cluj" by dictator Nicolae Ceaușescu in 1974 as a means of asserting Romanian claims to the region on the basis of the theory of Daco-Roman Continuity. Although the precise date of the conquest of Transylvania by the Hungarians is not known, the earliest Hungarian artifacts found in the region are dated to the first half of the 10th century. After the conquest, the city became part of the Kingdom of Hungary.

King Stephen I made the city the seat of the castle county of Kolozs, and King Saint Ladislaus I of Hungary founded the abbey of Cluj-Mănăştur (Kolozsmonostor), destroyed during the Tatar invasions in 1241 and 1285. As for the civilian colony, a castle and a village were built to the northwest of the ancient Napoca no later than the late 12th century. This new village was settled by large groups of Transylvanian Saxons, encouraged during the reign of Crown Prince Stephen, Duke of Transylvania.

The first reliable mention of the settlement dates from 1275, in a document of King Ladislaus IV of Hungary, when the village (Villa Kulusvar) was granted to the Bishop of Transylvania. On August 19, 1316, during the rule of the new king, Charles I of Hungary, Cluj was granted the status of a city (Latin: civitas), as a reward for the Saxons' contribution to the defeat of the rebellious Transylvanian voivode, Ladislaus Kán. In memory of this event, the Saint Michael Church started to be built.

In 1331, the voivode of Transylvania lost his supremacy over Kuluzsvar. Kolozsvar-Klausenburg became a royal free city in 1405. By this time the number of Saxon and Hungarian inhabitants was equal, and King Matthias Corvinus (born in Klausenburg in 1440) ordered that the office of the chief judge should alternate between Hungarians and Saxons.

The lovers of Cluj-Napoca are believed to have lived between 1450 and 1550.

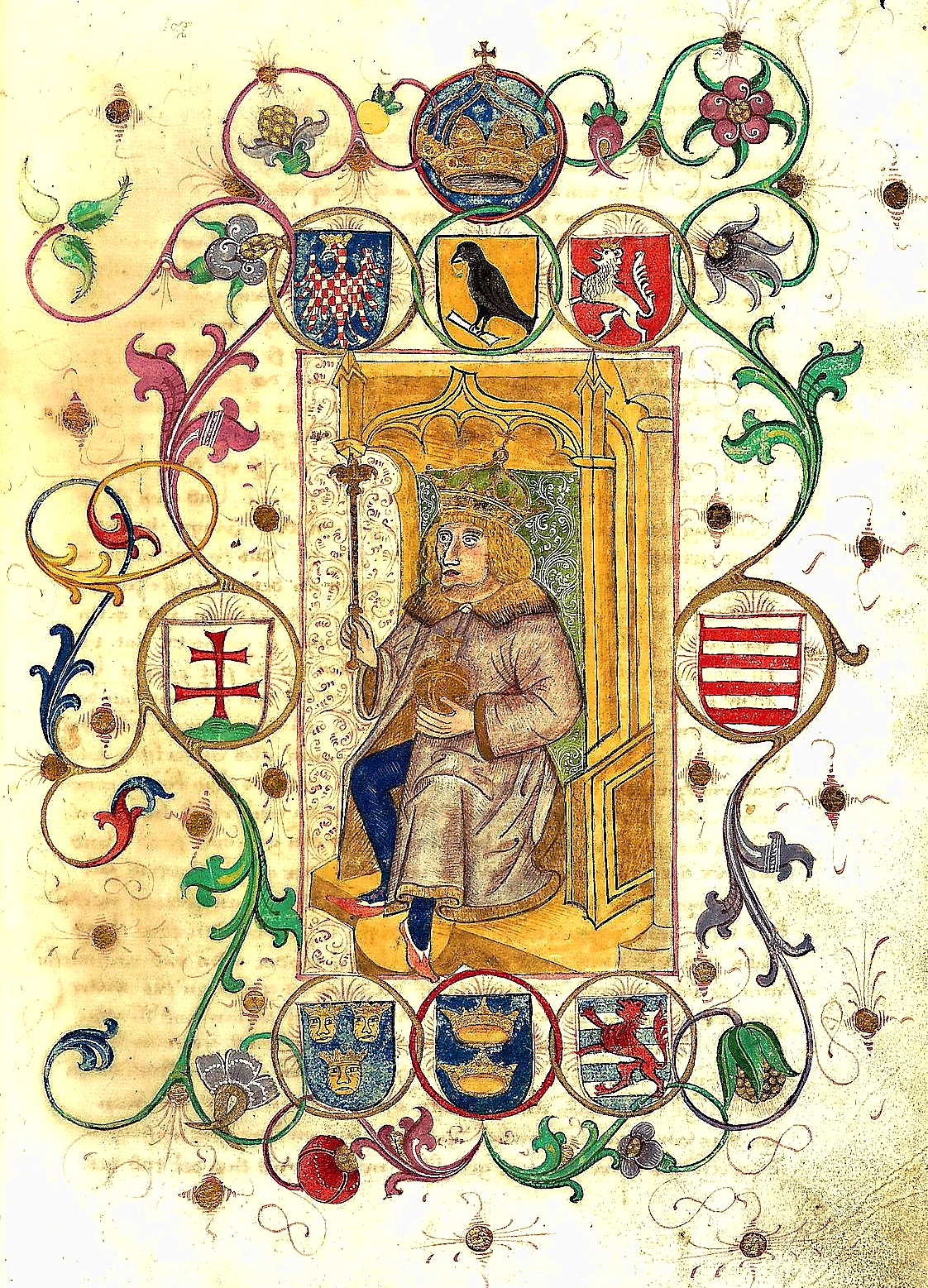
Matthias Corvinus heraldry as depicted in Johannes de Thurocz's manuscript (1490)

== Principality of Transylvania ==
In 1541, Klausenburg became part of the autonomous Principality of Transylvania after the Ottoman Turks occupied the central part of the Hungarian Kingdom. Although Alba Iulia served as political capital for the Principality of Siebenbürgen (Transylvania), Klausenburg was the main cultural and religious center for the principality. In 1581, Stefan Batory, Governor of Transylvania, took the initiative in founding a Jesuit academy in Klausenburg.

Between 1545 and 1570, large numbers of Germans (Saxons) left the city due to the introduction of Unitarian doctrines. The remaining Germans were assimilated to Hungarians, and the city became a centre for Hungarian nobility and intellectuals. With the Treaty of Karlowitz in 1699, Klausenburg became part of the Habsburg monarchy.

== Austrian Empire and Grand Principality of Transylvania ==
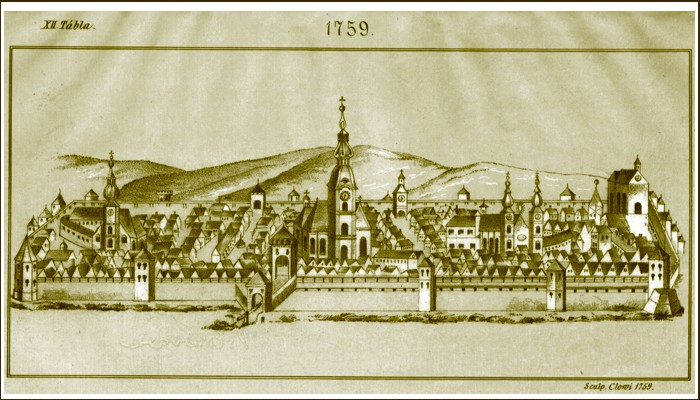
The town in 1759

From 1790 to 1848 and again from 1861 to 1867, Klausenburg was the capital of the Grand Principality of Transylvania (Siebenbürgen) within the Austrian Empire; the city was also the seat of the Transylvanian diets. Beginning in 1830, the city became the centre of the Hungarian national movement within the principality. During the Revolutions of 1848, Klausenburg was taken and garrisoned in December by Hungarian troops under the command of the Polish general Józef Bem.

In 1776, Empress Maria Theresa of Austria founded a German university in Cluj. But this enterprise was not to survive long, Emperor Joseph II replacing the university with the famous Piarist Highschool, where the teaching was done in Latin. The first Hungarian-language newspaper was published in Klausenburg in 1791, and the first Hungarian theatrical company was established in 1792. In 1798, the city was heavily damaged by a fire.

For lighting, oil lamps were introduced in 1826, gas lamps in 1861 and electric lights in 1906.

== Austro-Hungarian Empire ==
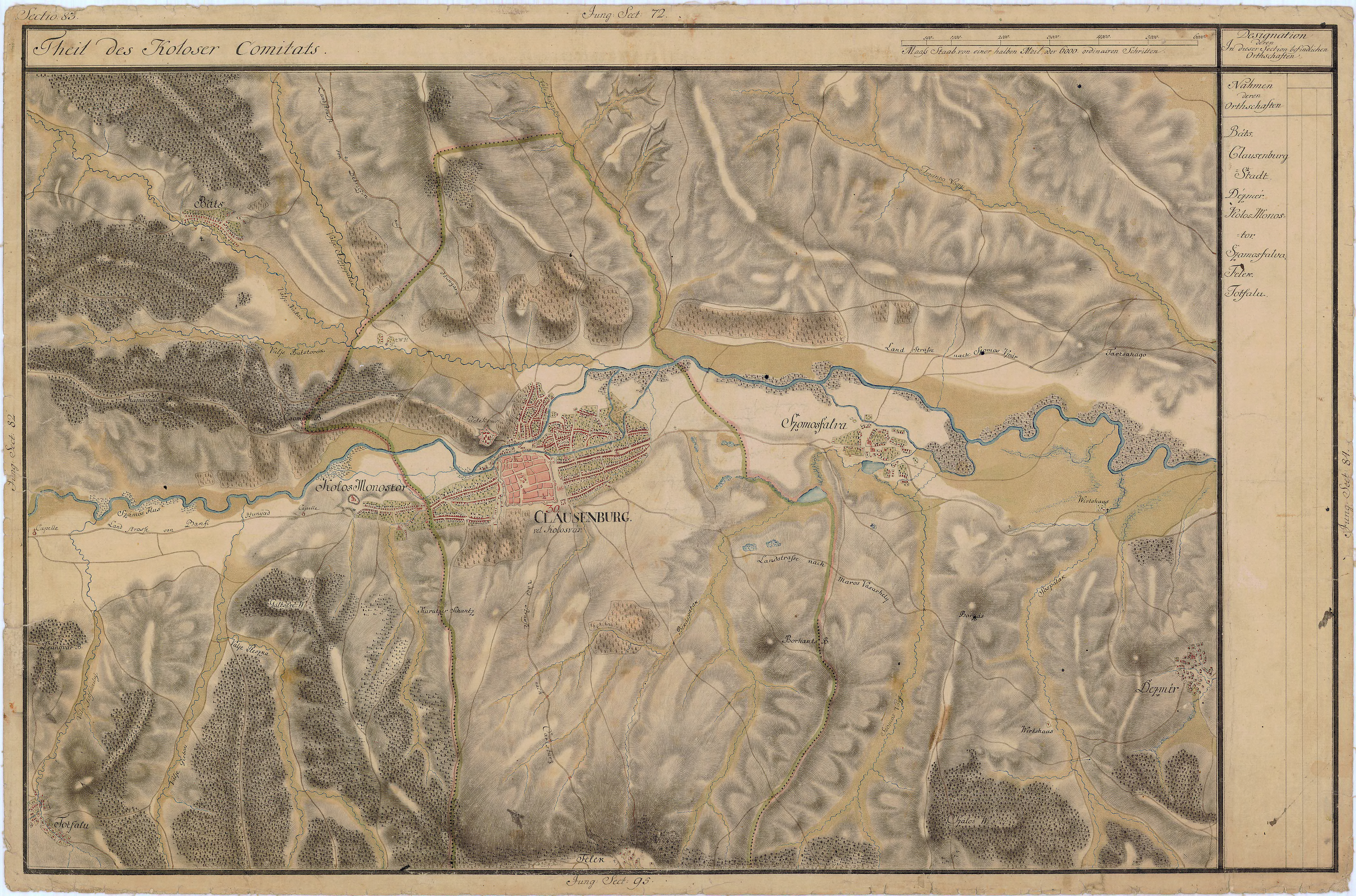
Cluj-Napoca in the Grand Duchy of Transylvania maps, 1769–1773. Josephinische Landesaufnahme

After the Ausgleich (compromise) which created Austria-Hungary in 1867, Klausenburg and Transylvania were again integrated into the Kingdom of Hungary. During this time, Kolozsvar was among the largest and most important cities of the kingdom, and was the seat of Kolozs County. In 1897, the Hungarian government decided that only Hungarian place names should be used and therefore prohibited the use of the German or Romanian versions of the city's name in official government documents.

In 1872, the authorities established a university in Cluj, with teaching exclusively in Hungarian, which caused discontent amongst the Romanian population. In 1881 the university was renamed Franz Joseph University after Emperor Franz Joseph I of Austria.

== Twentieth century ==
After World War I, Cluj became part of the Kingdom of Romania, along with the rest of Transylvania. The Romanian authorities took over the University of Cluj, transforming it into a Romanian institution. On May 12, 1919, the Romanian University of Cluj was set up, with King Ferdinand proclaiming the university open on February 1, 1920.

In 1940, Cluj was returned to Hungary through the Second Vienna Award, but Hungarian forces in the city were defeated by the Soviet and Romanian armies in October 1944. Cluj was restored to Romania by the Treaty of Paris in 1947. The Northern Transylvania People's Tribunal was set up in Cluj by the post-World War II government of Romania, overseen by the Allied Control Commission, to try suspected war criminals. The Cluj Tribunal passed a total of 100 death sentences, 163 sentences of life imprisonment, and a range of other sentences.

Cluj had 16,763 inhabitants of Jewish ancestry in 1941. After the German occupation of Hungary in March 1944, the city's Jews were forced into ghettos under conditions of intense overcrowding and practically no facilities. Liquidation of the ghetto occurred through six deportations to Auschwitz between May and June 1944. Despite facing severe sanctions from the Horthy administration, many Jews escaped across the border to Romania with the assistance of Romanian peasants of neighboring villages. They were then able to flee Europe from the Romanian Black Sea port of Constanţa. Other Jews originating from East European countries were helped to escape from Europe by an Anti-Nazi group led by the Jewish Joint and Romanian politicians in Cluj and Bucharest. The leader of this network, between 1943 and 1944, was Raoul Şorban. In July 2021, the Cluj Jewish Community 19th Century Burial register was among items seized from a Brooklyn Auction house by US Authorities.

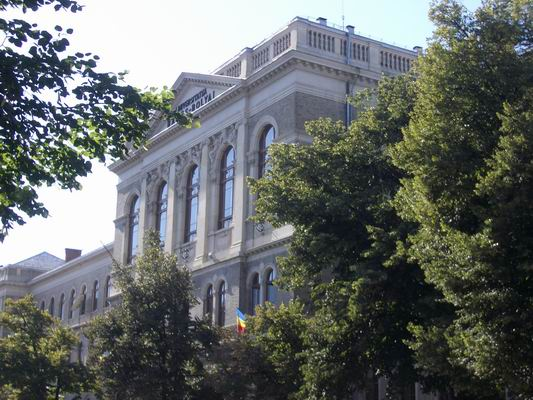
Babeș-Bolyai University

After World War II, the Romanian university (which had moved to Sibiu and Timișoara in the aftermath of the Second Vienna Award) returned to Cluj and took the name "Babeș", after the scientist Victor Babeș. Parts of the Hungarian university moved to Szeged and were later named University of Szeged, which became one of the most distinguished universities in Hungary and in Central Europe. The remaining parts formed the Hungarian University of Cluj and took the name "Bolyai", after the mathematician János Bolyai. The two universities, the Romanian Babeș University and the Hungarian Bolyai University, merged in 1959 forming the Babeş-Bolyai University, with teaching in both Romanian and Hungarian. Nowadays, this is the largest university in Romania.

Hungarians remained the majority of the city's population until the 1960s, when for the first time in its long history, Romanians outnumbered Hungarians. According to the 1966 census, the city's population of 185,663 was composed of 56% Romanians and 41% Hungarians. Until 1974, the official Romanian name of the city was Cluj. It was renamed to Cluj-Napoca by the Communist government to recognize it as the site of the Roman colony Napoca.

== After the Romanian revolution ==
Following the Romanian Revolution of 1989, the nationalist politician Gheorghe Funar became mayor for 12 years. His tenure was marked by strong Romanian nationalistic and anti-Hungarian ideas. A number of public art projects were undertaken by the city with the aim of highlighting Romanian symbols of the city, most of them regarded by Hungarian ethnics as a way of obscuring the city's Hungarian ancestry. In June 2004, Gheorghe Funar was voted out of office. He was replaced by Emil Boc of the Democratic Party. The laws on municipal bilingualism have not been applied in administration as the 2002 city census showed less than 20% Hungarians.

In 1994 and 2000, Cluj-Napoca hosted the Central European Olympiad in Informatics (CEOI). It thus made Romania not only the first country to have hosted the CEOI, but also the first country to have hosted it a second time.

The city is known in Hasidic Jewish history for the founding of the Sanz-Klausenburg dynasty.

In 2015, Cluj was awarded the "European Youth Capital" title.

== See also ==
- Clus castra
- Prehistory of Transylvania
- Ancient history of Transylvania
- History of Transylvania
- Celts in Transylvania
- Dacia
- National Museum of Transylvanian History
- Timeline of Cluj-Napoca
- Coat of arms of Cluj-Napoca

== Footnotes ==
a. The engraving, dating back to 1617, was executed by Georg Houfnagel after the painting of Egidius van der Rye (the original was done in the workshop of Braun and Hagenberg).
