= Matthias Corvinus Monument =

Monument in Piața Unirii, Cluj-Napoca, Romania

- Monumentul Matia Corvin; Mátyás király emlékmű
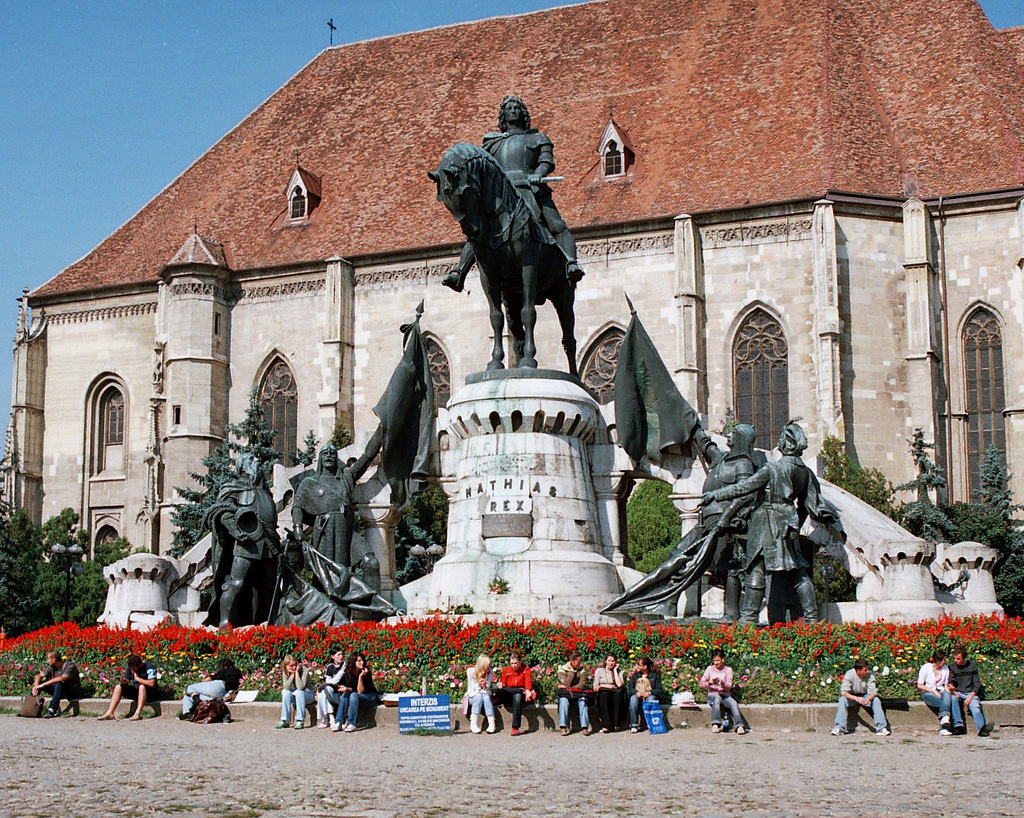
- Interactive map of Matthias Corvinus Monument
- Location: Piața Unirii, Cluj-Napoca; Romania
- Coordinates: 46°46′10.34″N 23°35′23.39″E
- Designer: János Fadrusz
- Material: bronze, stone
- Height: 12
- Beginning date: 1896
- Completion date: 1902
- Opening date: 14 October 1902
- Dedicated to: Matthias Corvinus

The Matthias Corvinus Monument (Romanian: Monumentul Matia Corvin; Hungarian: Mátyás király emlékmű) is a monument located in Piața Unirii, Cluj-Napoca, Romania.

This classified historic monument, conceived by János Fadrusz and opened in 1902, represents Matthias Corvinus. It is listed in the National Register of Historic Monuments in Romania, classified with number CJ-III-m-A-07819. After casting the sculpture in bronze in the ore foundry, another small plaster model was made and sent to the World Exhibition in Paris. The plaster sample has been awarded the Grand Prix, the highest award at the World Expo.

== See also ==
- Wesselényi Monument
