= Romanian Cultural Foundation =

The Romanian Cultural Foundation (Romanian: Fundaţia Culturală Română) is a Romanian non-governmental organization created in 1990 by writer Augustin Buzura, with the objective of stimulating cultural, artistic and scientific creations, promoting Romanian spiritual values in Romania and abroad, and fostering inter-cultural dialogue.

In 2003 it was reorganized under the newly established Romanian Cultural Institute, but then in 2004 it was re-established as a private foundation with the same name. The foundation continues the work of the original Romanian Cultural Foundation (1990–2003).
