= Cluj-Napoca Franciscan Church =

Church in Cluj-Napoca, Romania

Coordinates: 46°46′18″N 23°35′16″E

- Cluj-Napoca Franciscan Church

Religion
- Affiliation: Roman Catholic
- District: Roman Catholic Archdiocese of Alba Iulia
- Ecclesiastical or organisational status: Church
- Year consecrated: 1290

Location
- Location: Cluj-Napoca, Romania
- Interactive map of Cluj-Napoca Franciscan Church

Architecture
- Completed: 1290

The Franciscan Church is a place of worship in Cluj-Napoca, Romania. It was built between 1260 and 1290, on the site of an older Catholic church destroyed during the Tatar invasions in 1241.

== History ==
In 1390, the Benedictine monks received the church. They extended it and built a small Gothic cloister near the church, with the help of John Hunyadi.

In 1556, the Queen of Hungary, Isabella Jagiełło moved to the cloister and lived there with her son John II Sigismund Zápolya until 1557.

The church is located on Museum Square (Piața Muzeului), previously known as the Little Square (Piața Mică) to distinguish it from the Large Square surrounding St. Michael's Church; Caroline Square (Piața Carolina or Karolina ter), after the nearby Caroline Obelisk built in honor of the 1817 visit of Caroline Augusta of Bavaria and her husband Francis II; and Dimitrov Square (Piața Dimitrov), so named in the early communist period for Georgi Dimitrov.
