= Coat of arms of Cluj-Napoca =

Romanian coat of arms

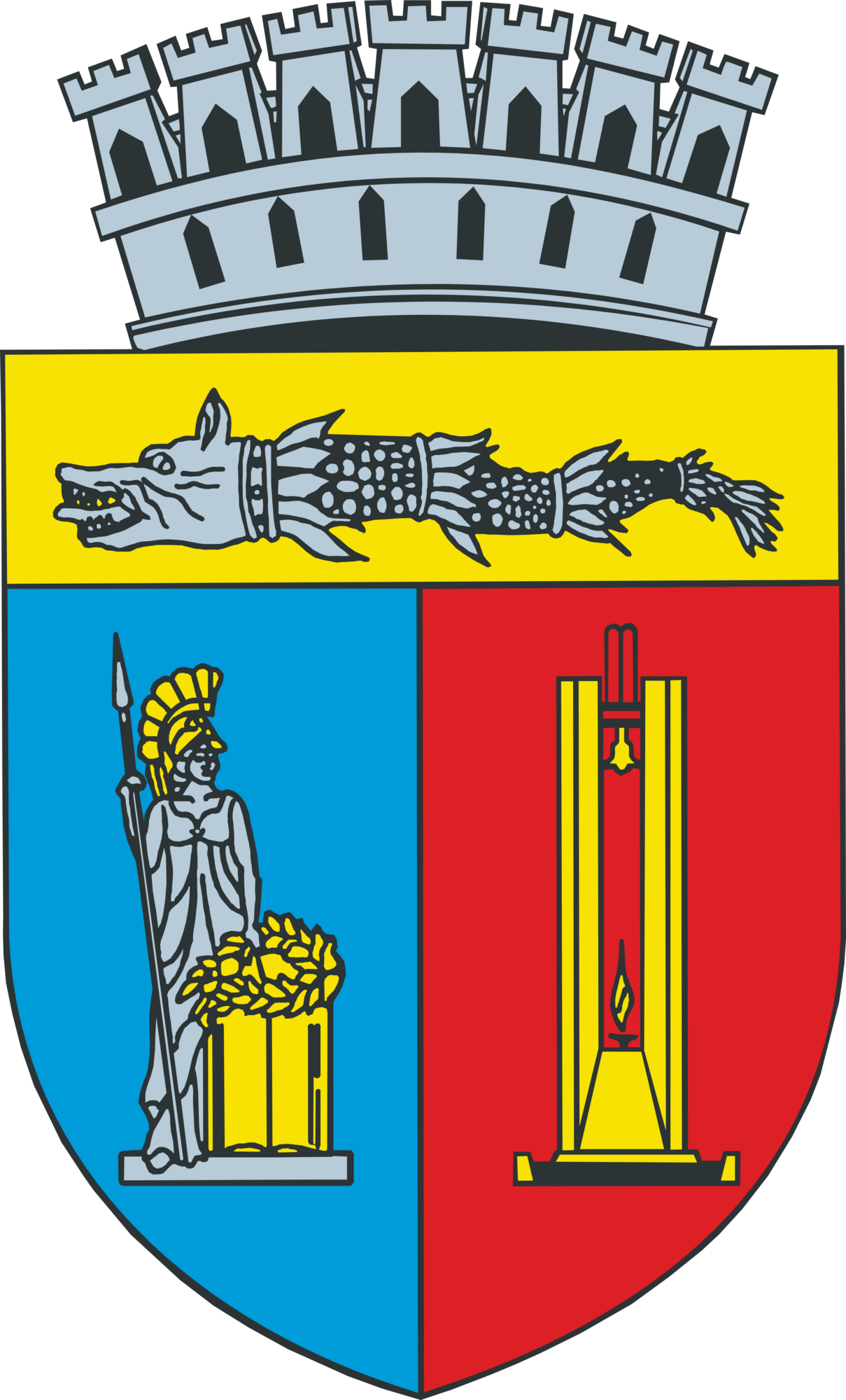
- Armiger: Cluj-Napoca City Government
- Adopted: 1999
- Crest: A seven tower mural crown
- Shield: party per fess; or, bearing a argent Dacian Draco; dexter: azure, Goddess Athena – Minerva; sinister: gules, the Monument of the Memorandists
- Supporters: None
- Motto: None
- Use: On the City hall's and Local Council's documents

The coat of arms of Cluj-Napoca is the heraldic symbol standing for the city of Cluj-Napoca, Romania. The city's first recorded coat of arms dates back to 1369, and since then, the coat of arms has mostly kept its features, until 1948. In 1970 a new coat of arms was designed by the communist authorities, inserting the original heraldic symbol.

The latest design dates from 1996, when the former mayor Gheorghe Funar organised a contest for the new symbol of the city.

== Description and symbolism ==
The current shield of Cluj-Napoca is party per fess; yellow (instead of or), bearing a white (instead of argent) Dacian Draco. The lower part is party per pale. The dexter part is of azure, bearing Goddess Athena – Minerva. The sinister part is of gules, bearing the Monument of the Memorandists.

The shield is topped by a mural crown with seven towers, which shows the city's status as a county seat. This is the only element that respects the rule.

Furthermore, the colors are the national colors, which contradicts the committee's regulation on not using the Tricolor on the coat of arms of local authorities.

== History ==
The coat of arms of Cluj between 1926 and 1948

Cluj's traditional coat of arms and seal was first awarded in 1377 by king Louis I of Hungary. It represents three towers, a city wall with a gate in silver on a blue background. It was the coat of arms of Cluj until communist rulers modified it introducing other elements but preserving the three towers in the bottom field. The three towers coat of arms was abandoned by nationalist mayor Gheorghe Funar, in a move which did not respect the respective Romanian law. As of 2026, the subsequent mayors of Cluj-Napoca failed to reintroduce the traditional coat of arms as demanded by many heraldists, historians and civil activists.
