= Romanian Cultural Institute =

Romanian cultural institution

- Founded: 2004; 22 years ago
- Founder: Government of Romania
- Type: Cultural institution
- Location: HQ in Bucharest
- Region served: Worldwide
- Product: Cultural diplomacy
- Subsidiaries: 18 chapters in various capitals and big cities
- Website: www.icr.ro

The Romanian Cultural Institute (Romanian: Institutul Cultural Român, ICR), headquartered in Bucharest, was established in 2004 on the older institutional framework provided by the Romanian Cultural Foundation and before 1989 by the Institute for the Cultural Relations Abroad. Since 2005 it has undergone a tremendous development that has seen a solid increase in the number and geographic dispersion of its chapters, now 18-strong.

Working in tandem with the Ministry of Foreign Affairs and in partnership with indigenous and foreign organizations, the Romanian Cultural Institute operates in Europe, North America, the Middle East, and China, promoting international cultural relations within the Romanian public ecosystem.

== International centers ==
The Romanian Cultural Institute has branches in several countries throughout the world:

- Republic of Moldova (Chișinău)
- Germany (Berlin)
- Belgium (Brussels)
- Hungary (Budapest, Szeged)
- Turkey (Istanbul)
- Portugal (Lisbon)
- United Kingdom (London)
- Spain (Madrid)
- United States (New York)
- France (Paris)
- Czech Republic (Prague)
- Italy (Rome, Venice)
- Sweden (Stockholm)
- Israel (Tel-Aviv)
- Austria (Vienna)
- Poland (Warsaw)
- China (Beijing)

== Governance ==
Between 2004 and 2012, RCI functioned under the authority of the Romanian president, who served as its honorary president. In 2012, the institute was placed under the tutelage of the Romanian Senate. The leadership of RCI is provided by a president, two vice presidents, an executive board and a steering committee. The cultural promotion work is managed through the chapters based in various capitals and big cities or the Bucharest.
