= List of 2017 March for Science locations =

The March for Science was a series of protests that occurred across the United States and around the World on April 22, 2017. The protests were organized due to the perceived hostility of the Trump administration, as well as proposed budget cuts to federal agencies such as the Environmental Protection Agency and the National Institute of Health. A major goal of the march was convincing government officials to adopt policies in-line with the scientific understanding of issues such as climate change and vaccines. The organizers estimated that over one million people in 650 locations on all seven continents attended. Listed below are several hundred of the affiliated marches.

== March locations in the United States ==
- AL
- AK
- AZ
- AR
- CA
- CO
- CT
- DC
- DE
- FL
- GA
- HI
- ID
- IL
- IN
- IA
- KS
- KY
- LA
- ME
- MD
- MA
- MI
- MN
- MS
- MO
- MT
- NE
- NV
- NH
- NJ
- NM
- NY
- NC
- ND
- OH
- OK
- OR
- PA
- RI
- SC
- SD
- TN
- TX
- UT
- VT
- VA
- WA
- WV
- WI
- WY

| State | City | Estimated attendance | Photo | Notes |
|---|---|---|---|---|
| Washington, D.C. | | 150,000 | | The main event in Washington, D.C., began with a rally and teach-in on the grounds of the Washington Monument (in spite of rain); Bill Nye, an honorary co-chair, addressed the crowd; other speakers included Questlove and Dan Abrams. Also present was Denis Hayes, co-founder of the first Earth Day in 1970. The crowd of marchers then proceeded down Constitution Avenue to the National Mall where scientists and others discussed their work and the importance of evidence-based policy. |
| Alabama | Auburn | 250 | | Auburn Unitarian Universalist Fellowship building - Magnolia Avenue, College Street and Gay Street |
| Alabama | Birmingham | 2,000 | | Linn Park |
| Alabama | Huntsville | 1,100 | | The march ended at the U.S. Space & Rocket Center. |
| Alabama | Mobile | hundreds | | Bienville Square |
| Alabama | Montgomery | 200 | | Oak Park |
| Alaska | Anchorage | 2,000 | | A rally was held at Delaney Park Strip, followed by a march to C Street for Anchorage Museum Earth Day Fest. |
| Alaska | Atka Island | 1 | | Ecology researcher Bruce Wright, the only scientist on this island (population <100), held up a small sign for a Twitter pic: “Science is Truth” |
| Alaska | Dillingham | 100 | | UAF Bristol Bay Campus |
| Alaska | Fairbanks | 1,000+ | | More than 1,000 met at Ryan Middle School for speeches, music and activities, and an up and down Airport Way. The event was preceded by a People's Climate Rally on the parking lot of Lathrop High School (Alaska) and followed by Earth Day activities at Barnette Magnet School |
| Alaska | Homer | 100 | | Homer High School parking lot - Pioneer Avenue - Homer Council on the Arts |
| Alaska | Juneau | 350-600 | | The crowd rallied at the Alaska State Capitol before marching to the Renewable Juneau Fair at Juneau-Douglas High School. |
| Alaska | Ketchikan | | | march planned from Wolff Point to Ketchikan Visitors' Bureau |
| Alaska | Palmer | 364 | | Town Square - downtown Palmer |
| Alaska | Seward | | | event planned at the Harbor Master |
| Alaska | Skagway | 90 | | Alaska Marine Highway System Ferry Terminal - Skagway Elks Lodge 431 - Broadway |
| Alaska | Tok | | | Memorial Park - AK Highway |
| Alaska | Toolik Lake | 17 | | |
| Arizona | Chino Valley | | | |
| Arizona | Flagstaff | 1,000 | | Protestors marched from Thorpe Park to city hall, where Representative Tom O'Halleran gave a speech. |
| Arizona | Lake Havasu City | 70+ | | A group of people gathered at the corner of McCulloch and Acoma Boulevards in front of Octane Wine Garage, then walked approximately three miles down McCulloch Boulevard, across the London Bridge and back again. |
| Arizona | Phoenix | 3,000 - 8,000 | | At 10 am, the march started in front of the Historic City Hall with speakers and a rally. The protestors proceeded down Jefferson Street, then traveled to Fifth Street, up to Washington Street and ended their protest at First Avenue. A row of educational booths dedicated to science were set up at the protest site. |
| Arizona | Sedona | 59 | | The Women's March Sedona March for the Earth and March for Science; Creative Gateways - Thai Spices |
| Arizona | Show Low | 200 | | Officially named the White Mountains March for Science. |
| Arizona | Tucson | 2,700 | | A planned march had been officially canceled in favor of a rally due to budgetary concerns. However, about two hundred scientists and supporters of the "Women's March for Science" marched from Amory Park to El Presido Park, were 2,500 people had gathered for a rally. Tucson police blockaded traffic along the march route. |
| Arkansas | Fayetteville | 500 | | Hundreds marched in drizzly rain down Dickson Street and into a University of Arkansas auditorium. |
| Arkansas | Fort Smith | few dozen | | Ross Pendergraft Park |
| Arkansas | Little Rock | 1,000+ | | Hundreds gathered at the Arkansas State Capitol; the march was organized by the local Sierra Club and the Museum of Discovery. |
| California | Arcata | 3,000 | | Marchers walked down 11th Street toward the Arcata Plaza. |
| California | Berkeley | 2,000 | | The rally, organized by UC-Berkeley graduate students, took place at Sproul Plaza. Speakers included integrative biology professor Nipam Patel, graduate students and others. After the rally, the march went through downtown Berkeley. |
| California | Burbank | 40-70 | | Dozens marched along the Chandler bike path from Griffith Park Drive to Hollywood Way and back. US Rep. Adam Schiff participated. |
| California | Cambria | 50 | | Residents gathered in a downtown park for speeches and subsequent demonstration along the town's sidewalks. |
| California | Chico | 2,500-3,000 | | Trinity Commons |
| California | Crescent City | | | Held a teach-in rather than marching. |
| California | Fort Bragg | hundreds | | Bainbridge Park / Earth Day Festival at Fort Bragg High School |
| California | Fresno | 1,000 | | Radio Park - Blackstone Avenue |
| California | Fullerton | 1,000+ | | Fullerton City Hall |
| California | Grass Valley | 150 | | Held at Downtown Grass Valley Safeway Parking Lot as the satellite march for Nevada County. |
| California | Hanford | 15 | | corners at Lacey Boulevard & 12th Avenue |
| California | Hayward | | | Hayward Shoreline Interpretive Center |
| California | Hemet | 40-50 | | Hemet Democrat Headquarters - Hemet City Hall |
| California | Indio | | | At the Coachella Valley Music and Arts Festival |
| California | Kelso | | | Mojave National Preserve |
| California | Lancaster | | | event planned at corner of Ave L and 10 Street West |
| California | Livermore | 1,500-1,800 | | Participants gathered at Livermore High School. |
| California | Long Beach | 500 | | Atlantic Blvd; from San Antonio Drive to Houghton Park |
| California | Los Angeles | 50,000+ | | The march went from Pershing Square to City Hall with speeches by Lucy Jones, Tom Steyer and Allison Schroeder beginning at noon. Former NASA astronaut Garrett Reisman led the rally in an electric vehicle. |
| California | Merced | | | event planned at Courthouse Square Park |
| California | Modesto | 400+ | | About 300 people were expected to participate in Modesto's march, starting at Modesto Junior College east campus; hundreds more stopped in at the destintation point of Graceada Park. |
| California | Monterey | 1,000+ | | Colton Hall - Window on the Bay Park |
| California | Ojai | 200 | | Libbey Park - Ojai Valley Woman's Club |
| California | Olympic Valley | | | At Tahoe-Truckee Earth Day, both a morning March for Science and an afternoon Community March for Science were held. |
| California | Pacifica | | | Pacifica State Beach |
| California | Palm Springs | 100+ | | Sunrise Park |
| California | Pasadena | 1,000 | | California Institute of Technology - Memorial Park |
| California | Quincy | 100+ | | march along Main Street |
| California | Redding | hundreds | | Hundreds marched down Cypress Avenue. |
| California | Ridgecrest | 77 | | the march was followed by a community clean-up of trash. |
| California | Riverside | hundreds | | Superior Court building - Riverside City Hall |
| California | Sacramento | 10,000–15,000 | | Southside Park - Capitol Building |
| California | San Diego | 15,000 | | Demonstrators marched from Civic Center to Waterfront Park holding a wide variety of signs. Climatologist Ralph Keeling of the UC San Diego Scripps Institution of Oceanography spoke to the crowd. Another march was held on a Scripps marine biology research cruise at sea. |
| California | San Francisco | 50,000 | San Francisco | An "enthusiastic and peaceful crowd" gathered at Justin Herman Plaza, where scientists addressed the crowd before a march up Market Street to Civic Center, where activities and events were held. |
| California | San Jose | 10,000 | | The March for Science Silicon Valley left San Jose City Hall and traveled to Plaza de César Chávez, where Stanford University biophysicist and Nobel laureate William Moerner, neuroscientist and actress Mayim Bialik, U.S. Representative Zoe Lofgren and others spoke. |
| California | San Luis Obispo | hundreds | | Hundreds of people in "a jubilant and peaceful crowd" gathered at Emerson Park. |
| California | Santa Barbara | 5,000 | | Thousands crowded into De La Guerra Plaza for speeches by renowned Santa Barbara scientists, then marched to Alameda Park, site of the Earth Day Festival. |
| California | Santa Cruz | 4,000 | | Santa Cruz City Hall - San Lorenzo Park |
| California | Santa Rosa | 2,000+ | | Juilliard Park - City Hall |
| California | Sonora | nearly 250 | | Courthouse Park - Opera Hall |
| California | Stockton | thousands | | Stockton's annual Earth Day Festival was held at Victory Park. |
| California | Tehachapi | 100+ | | Central Park |
| California | Walnut Creek | 1,500 | | People rallied and marched at Civic Park. U.S. Rep. Mark DeSaulnier and state Sen. Steve Glazer spoke at the event. |
| California | Yosemite National Park | 150 | | Yosemite Village Visitor Center - Sentinel Bridge Parking Lot |
| Colorado | Aspen | 300+ | | Paepcke Park |
| Colorado | Avon | 100 | | Nottingham Park - Avon Road |
| Colorado | Breckenridge | 300 | | South Gondola Parking Lot - Riverwalk Path to Main Street Station |
| Colorado | Carbondale | 180 | | Alice March for Science; Goat Kitchen & Bar parking lot - Crystal River Trail along Hwy 133 |
| Colorado | Colorado Springs | 800-1000 | | Demonstrators gathered outside Colorado Springs City Hall in favor of science and opposed to anti-intellectualism and climate change denial. |
| Colorado | Denver | 15,000 - 20,000 | | Thousands of scientists, teachers, students and supporters of science from cities across Colorado participated at Civic Center Park. |
| Colorado | Estes Park | 250 | | Stanley Park |
| Colorado | Grand Junction | 900 | | Grand Valley residents marched from the old R-5 High School to Lincoln Park |
| Colorado | Gunnison | | | Legion Park, corner of Teller St and Tomichi Ave |
| Colorado | La Junta | | | downtown La Junta |
| Colorado | Telluride | 200-250 | | Elks Park |
| Connecticut | East Haddam | 300+ | | Several events were held: March for Science: 50 mL Fair at East Haddam Grange, & Satellite Vigil for March for Science & Earth Day Poetry Read-In at Two Wrasslin' Cats Coffee House |
| Connecticut | East Lyme | 500–1,000 | | March along Niantic Bay Boardwalk, from Hole in the Wall to Cini Park |
| Connecticut | Hartford | 1,200 | | On a rainy day, 1,200 people gathered at the Mortensen Riverfront Plaza. Lieutenant Governor Nancy Wyman spoke. |
| Connecticut | New Haven | 1,000-2,000 | | Protesters gathered in the East Rock neighborhood. The crowd was addressed by Senator Richard Blumenthal and Connecticut Department of Energy and Environmental Protection Commissioner Rob Klee. |
| Delaware | Lewes | 200 | | Canalfront Park. Lewes Mayor Ted Becker was present for the rally. |
| Delaware | Newark | 600+ | | The march started at the Unitarian Universalist Fellowship of Newark. It then proceeded down South Main Street and South College Avenue. |
| Florida | Clearwater | | | event planned at Crest Lake Park |
| Florida | Fort Lauderdale | | | event planned at Esplanade Park |
| Florida | Fort Myers | 1,200 | | For lack of securing a venue in Naples, Southwest Florida March for Science held its march in Fort Myers, from Centennial Park to a nearby court house via Monroe Street. |
| Florida | Fort Pierce | 200+ | | The Treasure Coast March for Science was held at Museum Pointe Park and along Seaway Drive. |
| Florida | Fort Walton Beach | 300+ | | Emerald Coast Science Center |
| Florida | Gainesville | 1,000+ | | Marchers walked from Ben Hill Griffin Stadium to Bo Diddley Plaza. |
| Florida | Hudson | | | |
| Florida | Jacksonville | hundreds | | Hundreds gathered at Jacksonville Landing in downtown Jacksonville. |
| Florida | Lakeland | 120+ | | Munn Park - march around Lake Mirror |
| Florida | Miami | 1,000+ | | More than a thousand people rallied at Museum Park, where a number of speakers addressed the crowd. People then marched along Biscayne Boulevard to the Government Center in downtown Miami. |
| Florida | New Smyrna Beach | 425 | | Several hundred people attended an afternoon Earth Day event at The United Church of Christ, then marched a 3-mile loop up the North Causeway and over the bridge. |
| Florida | Orlando | thousands | | Thousands marched through Lake Eola Park. Orlando Mayor Buddy Dyer attended. |
| Florida | Pensacola | ~100 | | A march was held at Bayview Park |
| Florida | Sarasota | 1,000+ | | The march began at Five Points Park, and took those rallying down Pineapple and Orange Avenues to J.D. Hamel Park, whence people demonstrated along U.S. 41. |
| Florida | St. Augustine | 500 | | Some 500 marchers walked through Lincolnville, starting and ending at the Willie Galimore Community Center. |
| Florida | St. Petersburg | 2,000-5,000 | | Thousands marched at Poynter Park. |
| Florida | Tallahassee | 4,000+ | Tallahassee, Florida | More than 4,000 people marched from Anita Favors Thompson Plaza near Railroad Square to the Old Florida Capitol. Florida State University oceanography professor Jeff Chanton and others spoke. A planned march in Panama City whose permits were not approved joined the Tallahassee march. |
| Florida | Titusville | hundreds | | Space View Park |
| Florida | West Palm Beach | several hundred | | People gathered at two events: a Meyer Amphitheater gathering and a march from Dreher Park to Trump's Mar-a-Lago in Palm Beach. |
| (Georgia (U.S. state)) Georgia | Athens | 600+ | | Marchers gathered on the federal Courthouse grounds (in excess of a limit of 400 people) for a rally, before marching to Herman C. Michael Park. |
| (Georgia (U.S. state)) Georgia | Atlanta | 4,000 - 10,000 | | Marchers assembled around Candler Park. Police estimated a headcount of 4,000; organizers estimated 8,000–10,000. |
| (Georgia (U.S. state)) Georgia | Augusta | | | CSRA March for Science |
| (Georgia (U.S. state)) Georgia | Brunswick | 250+ | | Gateway Park - Queen's Square, by way of Newcastle St |
| (Georgia (U.S. state)) Georgia | Savannah | ~100 | | People gathered at Johnson Square on East Bryan Street and marched along Bull Street to Forsyth Park. |
| (Georgia (U.S. state)) Georgia | Statesboro | 80+ | | Georgia Southern University campus (Biological Sciences Building - Russell Union Rotunda) |
| (Georgia (U.S. state)) Georgia | Valdosta | | | |
| Hawaii | Hilo | 300+ | | More than 200 local scientists, researchers, teachers, students and science supporters gathered for the event's kick-off rally and evening march on Friday at Hilo Bayfront's soccer pavilion. The march continued Saturday morning with 100 supporters joining the procession of the annual Merrie Monarch Royal Parade. |
| Hawaii | Honolulu | 2,700+ | | At least a thousand marchers walked from the University of Hawaii at Manoa to Old Stadium Park, and back. |
| Hawaii | Lihue | 300+ | | corner of Ahukini Road and Kapule Highway |
| Hawaii | Maui | 50 | | A morning march was held on the Great Lawn of the UH Maui College Campus in Kahului. Later in the day, a "Swim for Science" was held (with waterproof signs and tarps, and underwater cameras). |
| Idaho | Boise | 1,000 | | On the steps of the Idaho State Capitol, march organizers took issue with "gag orders on some government science agencies, potential deregulation and cuts to others and a reliance on 'alternative facts.'" |
| Idaho | Idaho Falls | 413 | | Snake River Landing |
| Idaho | Pocatello | nearly 500 | | outside Frazier Hall, Idaho State University campus - Pond Student Union Building |
| Idaho | Twin Falls | ~60 | | Dozens of people from across the Magic Valley region protested in front of the county courthouse from 10:30 am to 1:00 pm. Interviewed protestors stated that their numbers peaked at 60. |
| Illinois | Carbondale | few dozen | | A morning march (LIFE Community Center - Turley Park) was held in conjunction with the All Species Puppet Parade, and a separate march (SIU Morris Library Foundation) was held in the afternoon. |
| Illinois | Champaign-Urbana | 5,000+ | | Protesters gathered in downtown Champaign near the Orpheum Children's Science Museum and marched. |
| Illinois | Charleston | 60 | | Coles County's first Science Fest, formed by the group Coles for Science, was held near Lake Charleston, with a march from the fishing pier to the red barn. |
| Illinois | Chicago | 60,000 | | Tens of thousands of people met at Grant Park for a rally filled with speeches from several prominent Chicago area scientists. People then marched down Columbus Drive to the Great Ivy Lawn at the Field Museum, for a three-hour science expo. The crowd size far exceeded organizers' expectations of 40,000, so much that at one point Chicago police pleaded with the public for latecomers to stay home instead. |
| Illinois | Geneva | 300 | | The march started at Geneva train station and ended at Island Park. Attendance was noted to be higher than expected. |
| Illinois | Normal | 100 | | "Dozens upon dozens" of demonstrators gathered at Uptown Circle, marched through Uptown, and ended the march on the quad of Illinois State University. |
| Illinois | Palatine | 469 | | Palatine Public Library |
| Illinois | Peoria | 500 | | Gateway Building |
| Illinois | Rockford | dozens | | The protest started in Joe Marino Park. |
| Illinois | Springfield | 700+ | | Over 700 protesters gathered in front of the Illinois State Capitol. Senator Dick Durbin addressed the crowd. |
| Indiana | Angola | 20 | | Soldiers Monument, Public Square; rally organized by the Community Coalition for Change |
| Indiana | Evansville | 500+ | | First Presbyterian Church - Four Freedoms Monument on Evansville's Riverfront |
| Indiana | Indianapolis | 10,000 | | Bicentennial Plaza on the west side of the Indiana State House |
| Indiana | Lafayette | 400 | | Riehle Plaza |
| Indiana | South Bend | 1,128 | | Howard Park - Jon R. Hunt Memorial Plaza in front of the Morris Performing Arts Center |
| Indiana | Terre Haute | 172 | | Wabash Valley March for Science; Dede Plaza - Seventh Street and Wabash |
| Iowa | Cedar Falls | 300 | | The march and rally took place at Overman Park with state Senator David Johnson as the first speaker. |
| Iowa | Davenport | 200 | | The protest was held at Fejervary Park. |
| Iowa | Decorah | several hundred | | Mary Christopher Park - Winneshiek County Courthouse |
| Iowa | Des Moines | 3,000 | | The demonstration took place at the Iowa State Capitol. |
| Iowa | Dubuque | | | (April 23) small park north of the Grandview Ave/Hwy 20 Bridge |
| Iowa | Independence | two dozen | | First Ward Park, across from Buchanan Clerk-District Court - City Square at the corner of First Street and 3rd Ave |
| Iowa | Iowa City | 400-500 | | Several East Iowans spoke at the Pentacrest before a march through downtown Iowa City took place. |
| Iowa | Mason City | | | event planned at Central Park, N Federal and 1st St N.E |
| Iowa | Tipton | | | Courthouse on Main Street |
| Iowa | Williamsburg | | | An eight-day, 80-mile "Climate Justice Unity March" was planned, starting at Little Creek Camp in Williamsburg, IA on April 22, and ending at the Iowa State Capitol in Des Moines on April 29. |
| Kansas | Manhattan | 200+ | | Kansas State students and faculty and other members of the Manhattan community gathered at the quad, then marched down to Aggieville. |
| Kansas | Mound City | | | event planned at 315 Main St |
| Kansas | Topeka | 300+ | | Hundreds gathered outside the Kansas State Capitol. |
| Kansas | Wichita | 1,000+ | | Old Sedgwick County Courthouse - Mid-America All-Indian Center |
| Kentucky | Bowling Green | 250 | | Thompson Complex, Western Kentucky University - Fountain Square Park |
| Kentucky | Lexington | hundreds | | Hundreds marched in the rain from Fayette Circuit Courthouse, through downtown Lexington, to 5/3 Pavilion. |
| Kentucky | Louisville | hundreds | | The march was postponed to Sunday, April 23 due to Thunder Over Louisville, an annual airshow and firework festival. Protesters marched from City Hall to the Kentucky Science Center and back. |
| Kentucky | Paducah | 80+ | | People from western Kentucky marched from Fountain Avenue and Broadway to Dolly McNutt Plaza in cold and damp weather. |
| Louisiana | Baton Rouge | hundreds | | Hundreds of pro-science demonstrators gathered at North Boulevard Town Square and marched to the Louisiana State Capitol. |
| Louisiana | Lafayette | 200 | | Protesters marched down Cajundome Blvd. |
| Louisiana | Monroe | 50+ | | Ouachita Parish Courthouse - City Hall |
| Louisiana | New Orleans | 5,000 | | Thousands gathered at Duncan Park/City Hall Plaza, including a "sizable contingent" of scientists belonging to the American Association of Physical Anthropologists (AAPA), which was holding its annual conference in the city. The AAPA had canceled its plenary session so that participants could attend the March for Science. People then marched down Poydras Street to South Peters Street and Canal Street. |
| Louisiana | Shreveport | 250 | | Caddo Parish Courthouse - downtown Shreveport. |
| Maine | Gouldsboro | | | Peninsula School parking lot, 71 Main St., Prospect Harbor |
| Maine | Machias | 75+ | | University of Maine at Machias’ science building |
| Maine | Orono | 200 - 350 | | Despite a cold drizzle, an estimated 200 to 300 rallied on the University of Maine campus, in front of Fogler Library. A letter from Sen. Angus King was read at the event. |
| Maine | Portland | 1,000 | | About a thousand people marched up Congress Street from City Hall Plaza to Congress Square Park. |
| Maine | Sanford | 60 | | Central Park - march around town |
| Maine | Unity | | | Unity College (TerraHaus - Unity House) |
| Maryland | Annapolis | 400-450 | | Lawyers Mall, Bladen St - march downtown |
| Maryland | Ocean City | 150 | | People rallied and marched down the Boardwalk. |
| Massachusetts | Amherst | 1,000 | | Hundreds of people from across western Massachusetts gathered at Amherst Town Common, then marched along North Pleasant Street. |
| Massachusetts | Boston | 70,000 | Boston | Thousands gathered on Boston Common on a rainy day, in a rally with enough science supporters to pack the Common along Charles Street from Boylston to Beacon. Speakers included former EPA director Gina McCarthy, who warned that EPA budget cuts "could roll back progress on our air and water quality that could weaken health protections for millions of Americans," Harvard and MIT professor George M. Church, MIT Media Lab director Joi Ito and Boston University PhD student Alicia Wooten. |
| Massachusetts | Falmouth | 600 | | The protest was held on the Falmouth Village Green, followed by a short march to Falmouth Public Library. Members of a number of scientific organizations in Cape Cod such as Marine Biological Laboratory, the Woods Hole Oceanographic Institution and International Fund for Animal Welfare attended. |
| Massachusetts | Great Barrington | 180 | | W.E.B Du Bois River Park |
| Massachusetts | Pittsfield | 250 - 400 | | Pittsfield Common |
| Massachusetts | Worcester | 300 | | Institute Park |
| Michigan | Alpena | 250 | | National Oceanic Atmospheric Administration center (NOAA) - Chisholm Street - Culligan Plaza |
| Michigan | Ann Arbor | 10,000–15,000 | | Thousands rallied on the Diag at the University of Michigan. |
| Michigan | Big Rapids | 21 | | Top Taggart Field, Ferris State University campus - State Street - Perry Ave intersection |
| Michigan | Cheboygan | 45+ | | Lincoln Street Bridge. Attendance according to organizers. |
| Michigan | Detroit | 3,000 | | Thousands joined the March for Science Detroit at Hart Plaza, and marched up Woodward Ave. |
| Michigan | Grand Rapids | hundreds | | Hundreds, if not thousands, of people rallied at Courtyard Marriott near GVSU's downtown Pew Campus, then marched over the Grand River crossing to head towards Rosa Parks Circle. |
| Michigan | Houghton | 500 | | Houghton/Hancock Portage Lake Lift Bridge |
| Michigan | Kalamazoo | hundreds | | Marchers gathered at Western Michigan University and marched down Michigan Avenue to Bronson Park. |
| Michigan | Lansing | 2,500 | | An estimated 2,500 gathered on the Michigan State Capitol lawn. Speakers included Dr. Abdul El-Sayed and former state Senator Gretchen Whitmer. |
| Michigan | Marquette | 250+ | | Berry Events Center - Federal Building (Post Office), Washington Street |
| Michigan | Midland | 500+ | | Carpenter Street School - Hines Street to Ashman Street - Chippewassee Park |
| Michigan | Petoskey | 500+ | | Hundreds assembled near the US post office at Howard & State Streets, then marched to the corner of East Mitchell Street and U.S. 31, outside People's Park |
| Michigan | Sault Ste. Marie | 135 | Sault Ste. Marie, Michigan | City Hall - march downtown |
| Michigan | Ypsilanti | 300 | | Mark-Jefferson Science Complex, Eastern Michigan University - Riverside Park |
| Minnesota | Alexandria | 50 | | Calvary Lutheran Church parking lot - Broadway to Third Avenue |
| Minnesota | Bemidji | 300 | | Protestors marched from Bemidji State University to the city's Paul Bunyan and Babe the Blue Ox statues. Many participated in a round dance before heading back to BSU for a science festival. |
| Minnesota | Brainerd | 300 | | People gathered in Gregory Park before marching west down the sidewalk on Washington Street, crossing the Mississippi River, circling Walgreens on Northwest Fourth Street and returning to the park. |
| Minnesota | Duluth | thousands | | Leif Erikson Park - Lakewalk - Maritime Museum, Canal Park |
| Minnesota | Grand Marais | 170 | | Arrowhead March for Science; Cook County Community Center - Harbor Park |
| Minnesota | Grand Rapids | 130+ | | Northern Community Radio (KAXE/KBXE) - Grand Rapids High School |
| Minnesota | Moorhead | nearly 200 | | Minnesota State University Moorhead campus - Veteran's Memorial Bridge |
| Minnesota | Morris | 225 | | The march started at the entrance to the University of Minnesota, Morris campus, traveled down Fourth Street to Atlantic Avenue, down Atlantic and ending at the Morris Theatre. |
| Minnesota | New Ulm | 100+ | | Hermann Heights Park |
| Minnesota | Northfield | 400+ | | NFLD March for Science; Bridge Square - Weitz Center |
| Minnesota | Park Rapids | nearly 40 | | A peaceful demonstration was held at a corner of Hwy. 71 |
| Minnesota | Rochester | 900 | | The march began at the Peace Plaza, headed along Second Street Southwest past the Rochester Public Library and into Mayo Park, and then returned to the Peace Plaza for a rally. |
| Minnesota | Saint Paul | 50,000 | | The march proceeded from Cathedral Hill Park to the Minnesota State Capitol. |
| Mississippi | Hattiesburg | | | Held with the Women's March for Progress, which had been postponed in January due to a tornado. |
| Mississippi | Jackson | (postponed) | | A march planned outside the State Capitol was postponed because of a threatening weather forecast. |
| Mississippi | Long Beach | 100 | | University of Southern Mississippi's Gulf Park Campus |
| Mississippi | Oxford | 100 | | Participants marched from the University of Mississippi to the Square. |
| Missouri | Columbia | hundreds | | Hundreds of people of all ages from the Mid-Missouri region gathered at a rally at the Boone County Courthouse, followed by a march at Eighth Street and Peace Park. |
| Missouri | Joplin | 200+ | | Main Street, downtown Joplin |
| Missouri | Kansas City | 5,000 | | Washington Square Park, at Pershing Road and Grand Boulevard. Speakers included state Sen. Barbara Bollier (R) and state Rep Brett Parker (D). |
| Missouri | Maryville | | | march planned: Memorial Bell Tower on the Northwest Missouri State University - Nodaway County Courthouse |
| Missouri | Rolla | 100+ | | Technology Development Center at Innovation Park - Fairgrounds Rd, Kingshighway, & Bishop Ave |
| Missouri | Springfield | nearly 1,000 | | Jenny Lincoln Park - Park Central Square. State Rep. Crystal Quade said, "I'm with what looks like almost 1,000 people in support of science." |
| Missouri | St. Joseph | dozens | | march through downtown St. Joseph |
| Missouri | St. Louis | few thousand | | The march started at Union Station and progressed down Market Street to Luther Ely Smith Square in front oft the Gateway Arch, where a number of speeches were given. |
| Montana | Billings | 30+ | | Instead of a march, a day-long event was held at ZooMontana, which included speakers, booths and hands-on activities for both kids and adults. At noon, about 30 people gathered at the amphitheater to watch the puppet show put on by Citizens' Climate Education of Billings titled "Montana Dogs: Dozens of Good Solutions." |
| Montana | Bozeman | hundreds | | At Montana State University, people rallied outside Centennial Mall, where a number of speeches were given. Participants then marched to Gallatin County Courthouse. |
| Montana | Great Falls | 200+ | | University of Great Falls campus |
| Montana | Helena | 600 | | Centennial Park - Memorial Park |
| Montana | Missoula | hundreds | | Protestors assembled in Caras Park, then marched across the Clark Fork River via the Orange Street bridge and along the Kim Williams Trail. |
| Nebraska | Hastings | 50 | | At Hastings College, members of the Student Environmental Action Coalition (SEAC) marched from Ninth St. to Burlington Ave, then returned to campus along Seventh St; SEAC later held a rally outside Hazelrigg Student Union. |
| Nebraska | Kearney | 40+ | | University of Nebraska at Kearney - the MONA |
| Nebraska | Lincoln | hundreds | | Nebraska Union - Nebraska State Capitol |
| Nebraska | Omaha | 1,000 | | Elmwood Park - Aksarben Village. |
| Nevada | Las Vegas | hundreds | | Hundreds showed up at Las Vegas' Arts District. U.S. Rep. Jacky Rosen spoke at the event. |
| Nevada | Reno | 2,000 | | Federal Building at Liberty and South Virginia Streets - Civic Plaza |
| Nevada | Spring Creek | 45 | | Spring Creek Marina |
| New Hampshire | Concord | 2,000 | | A couple thousand protesters gathered at the State House plaza, marched for a few blocks downtown then returned to the State House for a rally. |
| New Hampshire | Portsmouth | several hundred | | Occupy NH Seacoast March for Science took place at Market Square. |
| New Jersey | Atlantic City | 250+ | | People rallied on the Atlantic City Boardwalk on Albany Avenue (in the rain). |
| New Jersey | Princeton | 2,000+ | | Hinds Community Plaza - Witherspoon St & Nassau St - Monument Hall at Princeton University |
| New Jersey | Trenton | nearly 1,000 | | Marchers walked from Trenton War Memorial to the New Jersey State House Annex, calling for environmental protection and climate change action. |
| New Mexico | Alamogordo | 40-45 | | on the corners of White Sands Boulevard and 10th Street |
| New Mexico | Albuquerque | 4,000 | | About 4,000 science supporters gathered at Civic Plaza; scientists from the University of New Mexico, Los Alamos National Laboratory and Nature Conservancy spoke at the event. |
| New Mexico | Las Cruces | 600 | | The march began and ended in Plaza de Las Cruces. |
| New Mexico | Roswell | 15 | | North Main Street; in front of the Chaves County Courthouse |
| New Mexico | Santa Fe | few thousand | | Thousands of local people filled downtown streets in a march to the State Capitol for a rally in support of scientific pursuits and against what they saw as attacks on everything from climate change to vaccinations. Speakers included Santa Fe Mayor Javier Gonzales, U.S. Rep. Ben Ray Luján & U.S. Sen. Tom Udall. |
| New Mexico | Silver City | 100+ | | Western New Mexico University - Earth Day celebration in Gough Park |
| New Mexico | Socorro | 200-300 | | Joseph A. Fidel Student Center, New Mexico Tech campus - School of Mines Rd - Socorro Plaza |
| New Mexico | Taos | | | A Saturday march was planned to start at Taos Integrated School of the Arts and head down Paseo. |
| New York | Albany | thousands | | Thousands gathered at West Capitol Park in front of the New York State Capitol. |
| New York | Binghamton | 100+ | | Confluence Park - Martin Luther King Jr. Memorial Promenade |
| New York | Buffalo | 2,000+ | | A couple thousand people marched from Soldier Circle, up Lincoln Parkway, to Delaware Park, where they rallied behind the Rose Garden against what they called an attack on science. |
| New York | Corning | 200 | | The Twin Tiers March for Science took place at the Corning Painted Post High School parking lot. |
| New York | East Meadow | | | Cornell Cooperative Extension of Nassau County held a rally at East Meadow Farm, which wrapped up with a "march" for science around the property. |
| New York | Ithaca | 500+ | | Hundreds gathered at the Bernie Milton Pavilion on Ithaca Commons. |
| New York | New York City | 40,000 | | Amidst rainstorms, thousands lined up at Columbus Circle and marched down Broadway from 59th Street to Times Square, calling upon Trump "to reconsider proposed government budget cuts that could affect the future of the field." |
| New York | Plattsburgh | 100+ | | Trinity Park - SUNY Plattsburgh - Discover Service Earth Day Festival at U.S. Oval on the “Old Base” |
| New York | Poughkeepsie | hundreds | | Science March Hudson Valley took place in Poughkeepsie, where hundreds marked down Main Street to Waryas Park. |
| New York | Rochester | 1,800+ | | Rochester's March for Science began at Martin Luther King Jr Memorial Park, and headed through downtown to the Hyatt Regency Hotel on East Main Street, where the city held its first ever Science Expo. |
| New York | Rockville Centre | | | Center For Science, Teaching, & Learning (CTSL), Tanglewood Preserve |
| New York | Saratoga Springs | 300-400 | | Congress Park - City Center |
| New York | Schoharie | | | event planned at the lawn of Lasell Hall on Main Street |
| New York | Stony Brook | 500 | | Stony Brook University - Circle Road Bike Path |
| New York | Syracuse | 1,500 | | The rally was held in Clinton Square. |
| New York | Utica | 250 | | A march was held at Oneida Square Roundabout, followed by a rally at DeSales Center. Attendance estimate by organizer. |
| New York | Watertown | 160 | | A rally was held at the JB Wise Pavilion, followed by a trash cleanup along the Veterans’ Memorial Riverwalk. |
| North Carolina | Asheville | 2,000+ | | The march started at Aston Park and continued to the Vance Monument. |
| North Carolina | Beaufort | 250 | | Protestors marched from Grayden Paul Park to the Carteret County Courthouse, where they listened to several speeches. At 3 pm, a tree was planted at the courthouse to commemorate Earth Day. |
| North Carolina | Charlotte | 1,000 | | Marshall Park |
| North Carolina | Elizabeth City | dozens | | march hosted by Elizabeth City State University (ECSU) & Port Discover Science Museum |
| North Carolina | Greensboro | nearly 1,000 | | Governmental Plaza - Civil Rights Museum |
| North Carolina | Morganton | 94 | | Burke County Democratic Party Headquarters - old Burke County courthouse |
| North Carolina | Raleigh | few thousand | | Thousands marched from Shaw University to Moore Square for a rally and community science fair. Among the marchers was US Congressman David Price. |
| North Carolina | Washington | 250+ | | march hosted by Beaufort County Indivisible |
| North Carolina | Wilmington | 750 | | Roland Grise Middle School gymnasium - Hugh MacRae Park |
| North Dakota | Grand Forks | hundreds | | rally held at University Park |
| Ohio | Athens | 300+ | | Richland Avenue Park - Howard Park |
| Ohio | Cincinnati | thousands | | Protestors gathered in Fountain Square, where they listened to speeches from scientists. They then marched to City Hall and the Cincinnati Public Library. |
| Ohio | Cleveland | 10,000+ | Cleveland | The rally took place in Public Square in downtown Cleveland. "No immediate crowd estimates were available, but the crowd appeared to be as large as the one here for January's Women's March, which drew 15,000. Late in the day, city event planners estimated that 10,000 participated." |
| Ohio | Columbus | 2,000-4,000 | | Thousands rallied at the Ohio Statehouse, followed by a march to Columbus Commons where other events were held. |
| Ohio | Dayton | 1,200-1,500 | | Courthouse Square |
| Ohio | Delaware | 41 | | Hamilton-Williams Campus Center - City Hall; Ohio Wesleyan University |
| Ohio | Findlay | | | Hancock County Courthouse |
| Ohio | Mansfield | few dozen | | Activities and outreach at Central Park, no marching. |
| Ohio | Mount Vernon | 45 | | Hamilton-Williams Campus Center - City Hall; Ohio Wesleyan University |
| Ohio | New Philadelphia | | | Tuscarawas County March For Science; Courthouse on the square - Tuscora Park |
| Ohio | Oxford | hundreds | | Armstrong Student Center - Slant Walk. Oxford Mayor Kate Rousmaniere spoke at the event. |
| Ohio | Toledo | several hundred | | International Park - Dr. Martin Luther King Jr. Memorial Bridge - Imagination Station |
| Ohio | Wooster | several hundred | | Young and old gathered at the gazebo in Public Square. |
| Ohio | Yellow Springs | 30 | | Xenia Avenue & Limestone Street - Corry Street - Farmer's Market |
| Ohio | Youngstown | 200 | | march around Wick Park; rally at First Unitarian Universalist Church of Youngstown |
| Ohio | Zanesville | 24 | | Zanesville's March for Science was originally scheduled for April 29, but bad weather forced organizers to hold a rally inside the Muskingum County Courthouse and postpone the march to May 20. |
| Oklahoma | Oklahoma City | 2,000+ | | Oklahoma State Capitol |
| Oklahoma | Tulsa | ~800 | | A few hundred people participated in the Tulsa Science March at Johnson Park, and about 500 attended the annual Earth Day festival (held at the same location) over the course of the day. |
| Oregon | Ashland | 150 | | A planned parade was canceled after organizers were unable to pay over-time fees for the city staff needed to manage traffic. Despite the cancellation, around 150 people marched from Garfield Park to ScienceWorks, a local museum. |
| Oregon | Astoria | 50 | | People stood in the rain outside Astoria Post Office at 8th and Commercial Streets. |
| Oregon | Bend | 600 | | A short march started in front of the Bend-LaPine Schools Education Center; crowd size given by an attendee. Joining in from the city of Sisters, 25 miles away, were members of the Sisters Science Club, which, having hosted a 5-day "Celebration of Science in Sisters," did not hold its own satellite march on Saturday. |
| Oregon | Coos Bay | | | event planned at Coos Bay Boardwalk |
| Oregon | Corvallis | 4,000-5,000 | | Benton County Courthouse - Central Park |
| Oregon | Eugene | 2,000 | | Participants rallied at the campus of the University of Oregon in Eugene before marching to the federal courthouse. U.S. Representative Peter DeFazio spoke. |
| Oregon | Grants Pass | hundreds | | Riverside Park |
| Oregon | Klamath Falls | 100+ | | The march started in the downtown area of Klamath Falls at noon. Other events included an Earth Day Fair at Mills Elementary School. |
| Oregon | Newport | 675 | | On a rainy Saturday, over 600 people held an indoor rally at the visitor wing auditorium of the Hatfield Marine Science Center, then headed outdoors for a march (which had been planned rain or shine). |
| Oregon | Pendleton | 225 | | Roy Raley Park - Court Avenue / Pendleton River Parkway. March organizer and former USDA employee Andrea Mann had said, "a lot of researchers and scientists who work for the federal government locally don't feel as if they can risk attending the march." |
| Oregon | Portland | 10,000+ | Portland | Main article: March for Science Portland Thousands of demonstrators, including many young families, turned out to the Tom McCall Waterfront Park for Portland's March for Science rally. U.S. Representatives Suzanne Bonamici and Earl Blumenauer, among others, addressed the crowd. |
| Oregon | Roseburg | 150+ | | Roseburg High School - Stewart Park |
| Oregon | Salem | 1,000+ | | More than a thousand people demonstrated on the Oregon State Capitol grounds. |
| Oregon | St. Helens | | | march planned to start at Highway 30 and Columbia Boulevard |
| Pennsylvania | Beaver | | | Beaver County Courthouse |
| Pennsylvania | Bethlehem | 500+ | | Payrow Plaza, next to Bethlehem City Hall |
| Pennsylvania | Bradford | ~dozen | | |
| Pennsylvania | Doylestown | hundreds | | State and Main Street intersection - Bucks County Courthouse on Court Street |
| Pennsylvania | East Stroudsburg | | | |
| Pennsylvania | Erie | 600+ | | Perry Square Park |
| Pennsylvania | Hawley | | | WildHaley Parade and Earthfest Jam at Bingham Park |
| Pennsylvania | Lancaster | nearly 200 | | Hundreds rallied in Penn Square. |
| Pennsylvania | Meadville | 100-110 | | Diamond Park |
| Pennsylvania | Philadelphia | 10,000–20,000 | | Thousands gathered on the west side of City Hall, then marched down Market Street to Penn's Landing. Event organizers said that more than 20,000 people had participated, while Philadelphia police estimated 10,000. Among the many participants was Dr. Paul A. Offit, co-inventor of the rotavirus vaccine. |
| Pennsylvania | Pittsburgh | 5,000+ | | Thousands gathered at Bigelow Boulevard in Oakland and marched outside the Cathedral of Learning on the University of Pittsburgh campus. |
| Pennsylvania | Selinsgrove | | | US Post Office, South Market St. |
| Pennsylvania | Sharon | 135+ | | Shenango Valley March for Science |
| Pennsylvania | State College | 200+ | | Allen Street Gates - Pattee Mall, Curtin Road, Bigler Road & Pollock Road |
| Pennsylvania | Wilkes-Barre | 100+ | | The Rally for the Planet and March for Science took place outside Luzerne County Courthouse. |
| Puerto Rico | San Juan | 600 - 700 | | Plaza Colón - Pabellón de la Paz, Luis Muñoz Rivera Park |
| Rhode Island | Providence | hundreds | | Hundreds rallied at the Rhode Island State House. U.S. Representative David Cicilline spoke. |
| South Carolina | Charleston | hundreds | | Hundreds gathered at Liberty Square; Charleston Mayor John Tecklenburg addressed the crowd. |
| South Carolina | Columbia | 1,000+ | | State House steps and lawn |
| South Carolina | Greenville | few hundred | | A rally was held at ONE City Plaza. The Clemson satellite march joined Greenville rather than hold a separate march. |
| South Carolina | Myrtle Beach | 24 | | Members of The Ocean's Keeper, a group of students from Coastal Carolina University, held a community beach cleanup by the Boardwalk |
| South Carolina | Spartanburg | 65 | | event planned at Bethel United Method Church |
| South Dakota | Aberdeen | 29 | | Dozens marched from Central Park through downtown Aberdeen. |
| South Dakota | Pierre | 30 | | Federal building at the corner of Pierre Street and Sioux Avenue - Steamboat Park |
| South Dakota | Rapid City | nearly 1,000 | | Participants marked from the Surbeck Center at the South Dakota School of Mines and Technology to the Earth Day Expo at Central States Fair Grounds. Attendance was higher than expected by organizers. |
| South Dakota | Sioux Falls | hundreds | | Carnegie Town Hall - Dakota Avenue - Falls Park West |
| Tennessee | Chattanooga | 1,000 | | Around a thousand people gathered in Chattanooga's Main Terrain Art Park to show support for science and oppose the Trump administration's proposed cuts to science research. |
| Tennessee | Knoxville | 500+ | | Participants rallied in the rain at the Ayres South Lawn on "the Hill" at the University of Tennessee, Knoxville campus, then marched to the John J. Duncan Federal Building downtown. |
| Tennessee | Memphis | hundreds | | Despite rain, hundreds marched from Gaston Park to LeMoyne-Owen College. |
| Tennessee | Nashville | 4,000 | | Some 4,000 people turned out for the March for Science and Climate, held in downtown Nashville's Legislative Plaza. |
| Texas | Alpine | | | |
| Texas | Amarillo | 300 | | City Studios at Sunset Art Gallery - Medical Center Park |
| Texas | Austin | 10,000 | | Thousands gathered on the south lawn of the Texas Capitol, beginning the event with teach-ins. On the local march's Facebook page about 10,000 expressed interest in going. Close to 6,000 said they went. |
| Texas | Beaumont | 0 | | Beaumont's march was cancelled on March 30, three weeks before Earth Day. |
| Texas | College Station | 50+ | | march around Simpson Drill Field, Texas A&M University |
| Texas | Corpus Christi | dozens | | Dozens of local citizens marched along the city's bayfront. |
| Texas | Dallas | 3,000 | | The march started at Dallas City Hall and ended at Fair Park. |
| Texas | Denton | 400+ | | Chemistry and Environmental Science buildings at the University of North Texas - Ann Stuart Science Complex at Texas Woman’s University |
| Texas | El Paso | hundreds | | Mundy Park - San Jacinto Plaza |
| Texas | Fort Worth | 1,000 - 1,500 | | The march began outside the University of North Texas Health Science Center. |
| Texas | Georgetown | 61 | | Historic Courthouse |
| Texas | Houston | 15,000 | | The Houston event, which started at Sam Houston Park and ended at City Hall, was expected to be one of the largest in the nation. Organizers initially anticipated about 10,000 marchers, but they estimated as many as 15,000 showed up. |
| Texas | Lubbock | 200+ | | Louise Hopkins Underwood Center for the Arts (LHUCA) |
| Texas | Midland | 11 | | intersection of Wadley and Big Spring, in front of Wells Fargo |
| Texas | San Antonio | 1,700+ | | Hundreds rallied at San Pedro Park and marched around the campus of San Antonio College, "advocating for a broad spectrum of scientific concerns." |
| Texas | Sherman | 30 | | courthouse square |
| Texas | Wichita Falls | 6 | | |
| U.S. Virgin Islands | Charlotte Amalie | | | Addelita Cancryn Junior High School Ground |
| U.S. Virgin Islands | Frederiksted | | | After the march, people broke into groups and picked up trash along the beach or gathered near Fort Frederik for conversations about preserving the land and sea environments |
| Utah | Cedar City | nearly 200 | | Main Street Park near the Cedar City Library - Gerald R. Sherratt Library, Southern Utah University campus |
| Utah | Logan | 500 | | Utah State University and The Church of Jesus Christ of Latter-day Saints’ Logan Tabernacle - Historic Cache County Courthouse |
| Utah | Moab | 100+ | | Swanny City Park - 100 North and around downtown |
| Utah | Park City | 350 | | Brew Pub parking lot - Santy Auditorium. Park City Mayor Jack Thomas addressed the crowd. |
| Utah | Salt Lake City | 3,000+ | | Several thousand people marched in Salt Lake City, gathering at City Creek Park and walking to the Utah State Capitol. Nobel laureate Mario Capecchi, a professor at the University of Utah, addressed the crowd. |
| Utah | Springdale | | | Part of the Zion Canyon Earth Day celebration; lawn of the Bit & Spur Restaurant - Canyon Community Center |
| Utah | St. George | | | Town Square Park |
| Vermont | Brattleboro | | | Positive Geek, 12 Flat St. |
| Vermont | Burlington | | | Royall Tyler Theatre, UVM - Waterfront Park |
| Vermont | Montpelier | hundreds | | The rally took place on the Vermont State House lawn. |
| Vermont | Rutland | 70 | | About 70 people gathered for talks at the Rutland Free Library before marching down West Street |
| Virginia | Blacksburg | 900 | | At Virginia Tech, hundreds rallied on Henderson Lawn, then marched through town and on to Squires Student Center, where they gathered at Old Dominion Ballroom. |
| Virginia | Charlottesville | hundreds | | IX Park - Sprint Pavilion |
| Virginia | Lynchburg | 30+ | | Dozens rallied at the traffic circle at the intersection of 5th and Federal Streets. |
| Virginia | Martinsville | 200+ | | At least 200 people visited the Virginia Museum of Natural History for its ninth annual Earth Day Festival, which culminated in a March for Science down Oakdale Street, up East Church Street and Starling Avenue and back to the museum (60+ people, according to march organizers). |
| Virginia | Norfolk | thousands | | People gathered at The Plot in the NEON arts district, then marched up Granby St to the parking lot at O'Connor Brewing Co. |
| Virginia | Richmond | | | A community teach-in took plane at Gallery 5, followed by a march from Abner Clay Park. |
| Virginia | Staunton | 175 | | 75 people marched in the rain from downtown Staunton to Gypsy Hill Park Gym, where an additional 100 people attended an indoor teach-in event. |
| Virginia | Williamsburg | 25 | | Protestors marched around Colonial Williamsburg, between Merchant's Square and the Capitol building. Organizers had not obtained a protest permit, so protestors were divided into groups of fifteen to fall beneath gathering limits. |
| Virginia | Winchester | 250 | | Old Court House Civil War Museum - Loudoun Street Mall - East Piccadilly Street / Winchester City Hall |
| Wake Island | Wake Island | 3 | | Underwater march. |
| Washington | Bellingham | 2,000 | | Bellingham City Hall - Bellingham Public Library. A number of speeches were given, including one by former astronaut Wendy Lawrence. |
| Washington | Chehalis | 75 | | outside Vernetta Smith Chehalis Timberland Library |
| Washington | Coupeville | 100+ | | The "Whidbey Stands for Science" rally and march took place at Lions Park. |
| Washington | Ellensburg | 150 | | US Post Office - CWU's Student Union Recreation Building; event hosted by Kittitas County Democrats |
| Washington | Olympia | 4,000-5,000 | | Demonstrators gathered for a rally at the Legislative building and marched to Heritage Park, where more speakers addressed the crowd and additional activities were held. |
| Washington | Port Angeles | 300-350 | | North Olympic Group (NOG) and Olympic Climate Action held a Celebration for Science event at Port Angeles City Pier & Feiro Marine Life Center (no indication of a march, per se). |
| Washington | Pullman | 1,000 | | Pine St. Plaza - Reaney Park |
| Washington | Richland | hundreds | | The Tri-Cities March for Science & Celebration of Science took place at John Dam Plaza. |
| Washington | Seattle | 20,000 | Seattle | Main article: March for Science Seattle Thousands marched from Cal Anderson Park in the Capitol Hill neighborhood to Seattle Center. Biochemist and University of Washington professor emeritus Eddy Fischer, the winner of the 1992 Nobel Prize for Physiology or Medicine, attended. Rally speakers included Governor Jay Inslee. |
| Washington | Shelton | 60+ | | Loop Field at Evergreen Elementary - downtown Shelton - Mason Transit Authority Transit-Community Center |
| Washington | Spokane | thousands | | Riverfront Park - Spokane City Hall. At one point, the marchers who filled the route along Spokane Falls Boulevard stretched nine city blocks. |
| Washington | Tacoma | 1,000+ | | More than a thousand marchers gathered at Tollefson Plaza. |
| Washington | Wenatchee | hundreds | | Wenatchee Memorial Park |
| Washington | White Salmon | 330 | | Rheingarten Park |
| Washington | Yakima | 200 | | Downtown Yakima - Performance Park; march organized by local nonprofit Act Yakima and the Unitarian Universalist Church of Yakima |
| West Virginia | Buckhannon | | | People marched in freezing rain outside the Upshur County Courthouse, then held a "Celebration of Science" in Jawbone Park. |
| West Virginia | Huntington | 255 - 300 | | Around 300 supporters filled Heritage Station. A planned march in Charleston was canceled, with marchers encouraged to participate in Huntington. |
| West Virginia | Morgantown | 500 | | About 500 people gathered outside West Virginia University's Woodburn Hall before the march. |
| Wisconsin | Appleton | 400+ | | Lawrence Memorial Chapel - corner of College Avenue and Appleton Street; rally at Houdini Plaza |
| Wisconsin | Ashland | several hundred | | Main Street march to Ashland Bandshell |
| Wisconsin | Eau Claire | nearly 350 | | UW-Eau Claire campus: Phillips Science Hall - Owen Park - Phoenix Park |
| Wisconsin | Green Bay | 450 | | rally at The City Deck; march along Fox River |
| Wisconsin | Hayward | 60+ | | Protestors gathered at the municipal parking lot, then marched to the Sawyer County Courthouse and later to U.S. Route 63. |
| Wisconsin | Kenosha | 250+ | | Gateway Technical College |
| Wisconsin | La Crosse | 250+ | | Weigent Park |
| Wisconsin | Madison | 4,000-5,000 | | Thousands participated in a March for Science that began at James Madison Park and ended at the University of Wisconsin–Madison's Library Mall. Speakers included chemistry professor Bassam Shakhashiri and Tia Nelson, daughter of Earth Day founder Gaylord Nelson. Madison also held its Climate March at the State Capitol the same day (about 2,500 people). |
| Wisconsin | Marshfield | 427 - 500+ | | Organizers of the march, which began at Everett Roehl Marshfield Public Library, counted 427 people marching through downtown, and over 500 attending the rally held at Oak Avenue Community Center. |
| Wisconsin | Milwaukee | 2,000 | | Rally participants gathered at Red Arrow Park and marched in downtown Milwaukee, passing by Milwaukee Public Museum, Central Library and other academic institutions. In addition to the Trump administration's proposed cuts to science and research, protesters also expressed opposition to the administration's proposals to cut the Great Lakes Restoration Initiative from the federal budget. |
| Wisconsin | Minocqua | 200+ | | Calvary Lutheran Church - Torpy Park |
| Wisconsin | Oshkosh | 300 | | Roe Park - downtown Oshkosh |
| Wisconsin | Rice Lake | 100+ | | Rice Lake High School parking lot - Knapp-Stout Park |
| Wisconsin | Stevens Point | 25 | | Science/Climate March community group photo op planned at bus stop on Main Street, next to Shopko |
| Wisconsin | Webster | 3 | | Squirrel Ridge Farm |
| Wyoming | Cody | 170+ | | Cody City Park |
| Wyoming | Jackson Hole | hundreds | | Home Ranch visitor center - Town Square |
| Wyoming | Laramie | several hundred | | Hundreds met on the lawn of the southwest corner of University of Wyoming campus at 9th St and Ivinson Ave, then marched down Ivinson Ave to the downtown plaza. |
| Wyoming | Pinedale | 50+ | | American Legion Park - Ridley's, Pine Street |
| Wyoming | Yellowstone National Park | 208+ | | Outside the Visitor Center at Old Faithful, in lieu of a literal march, two staffers set up a table for a petition signing event, as a way for both park employees and tourists to reach their representatives in Washington re climate change. Over 200 signatures were collected. |

== March locations outside the United States ==
Listed below are 154 marches outside the United States in support of the 2017 March for Science.

- Antarctica
- Argentina
- Australia
- Austria
- Bahamas
- Bangladesh
- Belgium
- Bhutan
- Brazil
- British Virgin Islands
- Canada
- Cayman Islands
- Chile
- Colombia
- Costa Rica
- Croatia
- Denmark
- Ecuador
- Fiji
- France
- Germany
- Ghana
- Greenland
- Hong Kong
- Hungary
- Iceland
- India
- Ireland
- Italy
- Japan
- Malawi
- Mexico
- Netherlands
- New Zealand
- Nigeria
- Norway
- Panama
- Philippines
- Poland
- Portugal
- Romania
- Slovakia
- South Africa
- South Korea
- Spain
- Sweden
- Switzerland
- Uganda
- Ukraine
- United Kingdom
- Vietnam

| Country | City | Estimated attendance | Photo | Notes |
|---|---|---|---|---|
| Antarctica | Neumayer Station III | 7 | | Seven German scientists, stationed in the Alfred Wegener Institute for Polar and Marine Research's Antarctic research station Neumayer Station III over the winter, exited the station to show their support for the march. Weather conditions were reported to be below freezing with twenty-six mile per hour (42 km/h) wind gusts. |
| Argentina | Buenos Aires | | | The group Jóvenes Eclogxs en Red organized a “mateada por la Ciencia” at Faculty of Agronomy of the University of Buenos Aires. |
| Argentina | Córdoba | | | |
| Argentina | Tucumán | | | |
| Australia | Adelaide | 220 | | Rally held on the upper terrace lawns outside the South Australian Museum. |
| Australia | Brisbane | 1,000+ | Brisbane | Marchers walked from Reddacliff Place to Parliament House, Brisbane |
| Australia | Cairns | 500+ | | Cairns Esplanade |
| Australia | Canberra | 1,000+ | | More than 1,000 people gathered at Parliament House. Karlie Noon, a graduate student in Astronomy and Astrophysics (Australian National University); Geoff McNamara, the 2014 recipient of the Prime Minister's Prize for Excellence in Science Teaching in Secondary Schools; Emily Banks, one of the 2015 recipients of the Medical Journal of Australia/MDA National Prize for Excellence in Medical Research (Australian National University); and Will Steffen (Australian National University) spoke at the march. |
| Australia | Hobart | 138 | | rally held on Hobart's Parliamentary House lawns |
| Australia | Launceston | 50+ | | The first Tasmanian March for Science was held at University of Tasmania's School of Architecture and Design. |
| Australia | Melbourne | 4,000 | Melbourne | Marchers gathered at State Library Victoria for opening speeches, then walked down Swanston & Bourke Streets to Parliament House for final speeches, then resumed marching along Spring Street to Treasury Gardens. Former Labor science minister Barry Jones addressed the crowd. |
| Australia | Perth | hundreds | | rally outside Commonwealth Bank at Forrest Place |
| Australia | Port Macquarie | 40 - 60 | | Supporters marched from Town Beach to the Town Green; a meeting followed at the Port Macquarie Historic Courthouse. |
| Australia | Sydney | 3,000 | | At the March for Science Sydney rally in Martin Place, University of New South Wales climate scientist Angela Maharaj, sociologist Eva Cox, and former Liberal Party leader John Hewson addressed a crowd of 3,000. |
| Australia | Townsville | 125+ | | rally held at Strand Park |
| Austria | Vienna | 1,600 - 3,000 | | A "Science Picnic" was held at Sigmund-Freud Park, followed by a march through Vienna's City center that ended at Maria-Theresien-Platz. Police estimated 1,600 people, while organizers put the number at 3,000. |
| The Bahamas | Hope Town | | | Wine Down Sipsip, Queen's Hwy |
| Bangladesh | Dhaka | 300 | | A small group of protestors gathered at Sher-e-Bangla Agricultural University. |
| Belgium | Brussels | 200 | | At Albertina Square, marchers protested against cuts in the grants available for science and the upcoming rise of pseudoscience. Charlotte Thorley and comedian/scienceblogger Lieven Scheire were the organizers. |
| Bhutan | Wangdue Phodrang | 28 | | |
| Brazil | Belém | 100-200 | | Theatro da Paz |
| Brazil | Manaus | 300-400 | | The march started at 4:45 pm in downtown at the intersection of Sete de Setembro and Eduardo Ribero, and continued on the Praça do Congresso. Attended mainly by professors, researchers and students from UFAM, INPA, UEA and Fiocruz. |
| Brazil | Rio de Janeiro | | | National Museum of Natural History |
| Brazil | São Paulo | 200 | | Organizers were unable to obtain a permit to hold a march, so a number of educational tents containing information on scientific research were set up in the city. The University of São Paulo displayed scientific artifacts, including their insect collections and hominid skull casts in some of the tents. |
| British Virgin Islands | Tortola | | | Earth Day volunteer cleanup near Myett's Garden and Grill at Cane Garden Bay |
| Canada | Calgary | 400 | Calgary | Hundreds gathered at Olympic Plaza, outside City Hall. |
| Canada | Edmonton | several hundred | | Several hundred people attended a rally at the Alberta Legislature Building. |
| Canada | Halifax | 250 | | Hundreds gathered for the Halifax Grand Parade, outside City Hall. |
| Canada | Hamilton | 300+ | | Hamilton City Hall |
| Canada | Lethbridge | 25 | | grounds of the University of Lethbridge |
| Canada | London, Ontario | 100+ | | NW corner of Victoria Park |
| Canada | Montreal | hundreds | | Place Emilie-Gamelin |
| Canada | Ottawa | 600-700 | | Parliament Hill |
| Canada | St. John's | | | Alexander Murray building (3rd floor lobby) - Bruneau Centre |
| Canada | Saskatoon | 200 | | Victoria Park, Saskatoon |
| Canada | Sudbury | 80 | | Laurentian University students led a march along Paris Street to Memorial Park. |
| Canada | Toronto | 3,000 | | Marchers walked from Nathan Phillips Square to Queen's Park to "celebrate Canadian science and the role that science plays in our society ... and to stand in solidarity with American scientists who are facing obvious struggles with the current government and its support for science." |
| Canada | Vancouver | 500+ | | At least 500 marchers made their way to Science World. |
| Canada | Victoria | 750 | | Centennial Square, City Hall - Legislature |
| Canada | Waterloo, Ontario | hundreds | | Waterloo Town Square - King Street |
| Canada | Windsor, Ontario | 100+ | | Assumption Park - march along the riverfront |
| Canada | Winnipeg | nearly 200 | | Manitoba Legislature |
| Canada | Yarmouth, Nova Scotia | | | |
| Cayman Islands | George Town | | | |
| Cayman Islands | Little Cayman | 17 - 23 | | rally held at Southern Cross Club |
| Chile | Antofagasta | | | |
| Chile | Concepción | | | |
| Chile | Santiago | 4,500 | | In Chile, Santiago was one of the seven cities in the country where the march took place. |
| Chile | Valparaíso | | | |
| Colombia | Barranquilla | | | |
| Colombia | Bogotá | 300 | | Plaza de Bolívar |
| Colombia | Bucaramanga | | | |
| Colombia | Cali | | | |
| Colombia | Medellín | | | |
| Costa Rica | San José | 250 | | march thru the main streets organized by students from the University of Costa Rica (UCR) and the National University (UNA) |
| Croatia | Rijeka | | | |
| Croatia | Split | | | |
| Croatia | Zagreb | 2,000+ | Zagreb | Several thousand people gathered in Zagreb |
| Denmark | Copenhagen | 5,000 | Copenhagen | Niels Bohr Institute - Christiansborg Slotsplads |
| Ecuador | Urcuquí | 250 | | The march from Yachay Tech University to the town's central park was made to support the government's scientific policy and coincided with the celebration of the triumph of president-elect Lenín Moreno. |
| Fiji | Tokoriki | 2 | | Julie Robson, a former lemur geneticist, and her 7-year-old daughter joined the New Zealand marchers in spirit from a Fiji beach. |
| France | Bordeaux | 500 - 700 | | Hundreds marched along the Bordeaux quay from the eco-citizen house (Pont de Pierre) to Cap Sciences (Pont Chaban-Delmas). |
| France | Brest | 100-150 | | Les Capucins |
| France | Clermont-Ferrand | | | Jardin Lecoq |
| France | Grenoble | 400 - 550 | | Paul Mistral park - Jardin de Ville |
| France | Lille | | | |
| France | Lyon | 400 | | Place Raspail - La Mairie de Lyon - Place Bellecour |
| France | Marseille | 500 - 1,000 | Marseille | Hundreds of people gathered at the Hôtel de Ville, and marched around the Vieux Port to the Ombrière pavilion. |
| France | Montpellier | 800 | | Hundreds gathered at Peyrou Esplanade, where participants formed the word "SCIENCE" in letters large enough to be photographed from space by one of the Pleaides satellites. People then marched to the Place de la Comédie. |
| France | Nancy | 340 | | Porte Sainte-Catherine |
| France | Nantes | 500 | | Place du Bouffay - Brittany Tower |
| France | Nice | 300 | | Place Garibaldi |
| France | Paris | 5,000 | | An estimated 5,000 participants marched from Place Valhubert near Jardin des Plantes to Place Saint-Michel. The Société Française de Physique, the Ecole Normale Supérieure and the University d'Orsay participated. "Science does not stop at the door of laboratories! " said Adrien Jeantet, a young physicist at the origin of this mobilization. Also present, mathematician Michel Broué & Akito Kawahara, a biologist from the University of Florida in Paris. |
| France | Rennes | 200 | | Espace des Sciences |
| France | Strasbourg | 350 | | Place Kléber - rue des Grandes Arcades - Place du Corbeau - Quais des Bâteliers & des Pêcheurs - Palais Universitaire |
| France | Thonon-les-Bains | 161 | | Thonon Police Station parking lot - Place des Arts / Bernex Haute-Savoie |
| France | Toulouse | hundreds | | La Prairie des Filtres |
| Germany | Berlin | 11,000 | Berlin | Marching took place between the Humboldt University and the Brandenburg Gate. |
| Germany | Dresden | 2,000 | | Minister of Science of Saxony, Eva-Maria Stange, spoke to the large crowd gathered at Theaterplatz. |
| Germany | Frankfurt am Main | 2,500 | Frankfurt | Bockenheimer Warte - Römerberg |
| Germany | Freiburg | 2,500 | Freiburg | Platz der Weißen Rose, inner courtyard of Albert Ludwig University - Augustinerplatz |
| Germany | Göttingen | 1,400 - 2,500 | | Gänseliesel - Uni-Campus (Platz der Göttinger Sieben) |
| Germany | Greifswald | 300 - 400+ | Greifswald | Greifswald Marktplatz |
| Germany | Hamburg | 2,000 | Hamburg | Rathausmarkt - main building on the University of Hamburg |
| Germany | Heidelberg | 1,800 | Heidelberg | Friedrich-Ebert-Platz - Uniplatz. Despite the drizzle, not only Heidelberg residents but also guests from Mannheim, Karlsruhe and Mainz poured into the old town. |
| Germany | Jena | 1,000 | Jena | University of Jena's main building - Carl-Zeiss-Platz / Ernst-Abbe-Platz |
| Germany | Kassel | 250 | | Bebelplatz |
| Germany | Köln/Bonn | 1,000 - 1,500 | | University of Bonn Hofgartenwiese |
| Germany | Leipzig | 1,100 - 1,300 | Leipzig | Naturkundemuseum |
| Germany | Munich | 3,000 | Munich | Karlsplatz - Münchner Freiheit - Siegestor |
| Germany | Rostock | 250 | | Town Hall, Neuer Markt - University main building |
| Germany | Stuttgart | 250-400 | Stuttgart | Schlossplatz. Police estimated 250 marchers; march organizers, 400. |
| Germany | Trier | | | Porta Nigra |
| Germany | Tübingen | almost 3,000 | | Thousands met at the Neckarinsel, then marched through the old town, accompanied by music, going through the old botanical garden and arriving at the new auditorium in Neuen Aula, where a rally was held. |
| Ghana | Accra | 100+ | | March for Science supporters conducted a teach-in at a hotel near Accra's beachfront. They taught about issues important to Accra's citizens, such as the damage plastic waste was causing to local aquatic wildlife. |
| Greenland | Kangerlussuaq | 20 | | About 20 people in this tiny outpost of 499 people participated. The rally was organized by Mike MacFerrin, a Ph.D. student at the University of Colorado who is studying the ice sheet. |
| Hong Kong | Hong Kong | | | Did not hold a march as part of their gathering. |
| Hungary | Budapest | 200 | Budapest | The March started at Széchenyi István tér, in front of the Hungarian Academy of Sciences' building, and ended at Fővám tér. |
| Iceland | Reykjavík | hundreds | | Skólavörðuholt hill - city center |
| India | Coimbatore | ~120 | | Over 200 were expected to march around Race Course. |
| India | Hyderabad | | | |
| Ireland | Dublin | 600 | | Grand Canal Dock - the Dáil. |
| Italy | Bologna | | | Le Serre Dei Giardini Margherita |
| Italy | Carmine Superiore | 1 | | Only 2 people live here and one was away at the time of the March. Neutral attendees included 7 sheep and 9 cats. |
| Italy | Caserta | | | University of Campania "Luigi Vanvitelli" - Royal Palace |
| Italy | Florence | | | Piazza di San Lorenzo |
| Italy | Milan | 55+ | | Via Principe Amedeo |
| Italy | Potenza | | | Piazza Mario Pagano |
| Italy | Rome | thousands | | Thousands gathered at Piazza della Rotonda, near the Pantheon, and marched to Campo dei Fiori. |
| Japan | Tokyo | 50-60 | | The march started at Hibiya Park and ended at Tokyo Station. |
| Malawi | Blantyre | 70 | | Doctors, researchers, clinicians and science supporters gathered to Stand Up For Science. Much of the work in Malawi is funded by agencies threatened by U.S. budget cuts. |
| Mexico | Cuernavaca | hundreds | | Plaza de Armas |
| Mexico | Mexico City | hundreds | | Marchers protested against cuts to the National Council of Science and Technology and to the accused theft of state funds by the former governor of Veracruz. The march started at the Angel of Independence and ended at Zócalo. |
| The Netherlands | Amsterdam | 3,000 | | Thousands gathered on the Museumplein. |
| The Netherlands | Maastricht | hundreds | Maastricht | Plein '92 - Wijck & city center |
| New Zealand | Auckland | 300-400 | | Protestors marched up Queen Street. After the march, the protestors assembled in Albert Park to listen to speakers, including microbiologist Siouxsie Wiles and James Shaw, a co-chair of the Green Party. |
| New Zealand | Christchurch | 250 | Christchurch | Participants gathered in front of Canterbury Museum and marched to Cathedral Square, where a rally was held. |
| New Zealand | Dunedin | 300 | | Museum Reserve |
| New Zealand | Palmerston North | 234 | | The Square |
| New Zealand | Wellington | several hundred | | Civic Square - National Museum at Te Papa courtyard |
| Nigeria | Abuja | 100 | | |
| | North Pole | 3 | | Three researchers displaying a March for Science Banner walked over 140 miles to collect data on snow depth for NASA climate research. They had planned to stay at the North Pole through April 22, but left on the 21st after melting ice threatened the integrity of their runway. |
| Norway | Bergen | hundreds | | Tårnplassen |
| Norway | Bodø | | | Hundholmen Brygghus |
| Norway | Longyearbyen, Svalbard | 110 | | University Centre in Svalbard (UNIS) Science building - Miner's statue in the town square |
| Norway | Ny-Ålesund, Svalbard | 40 | | An estimated forty scientists marched through the research town, which is located in the Arctic Circle. A team of seven Norwegian scientists posed in front of a statue of Norwegian polar explorer Roald Amundsen in support of the march. |
| Norway | Oslo | 1,000 | | Rådhusplassen |
| Norway | Stavanger | | | Fiskepirterminalen (Tau Ferry) |
| Norway | Tromsø | 200 | | A number of speeches were given in the town's market square. Speakers included local politicians and Jan-Gunnar Winther, the director of the Norwegian Polar Institute. |
| Norway | Trondheim | 400 | | Kongsgårdsgata 1 - Trondheim Torg |
| Panama | Panama City | 500 | | march in Calzada de Amador (150 scientists involved) |
| Philippines | Quezon City | 200 | | Members of 350.org gathered at the Quezon Memorial Circle to show support for the scientific community. |
| Poland | Warsaw | 14 | | small gathering near the Nicolaus Copernicus Monument outside the Warsaw Scientific Society building |
| Portugal | Lisbon | few hundred | | Largo de São Mamede - Rua da Escola Politécnica - Largo do Carmo |
| Romania | Cluj-Napoca | 50 | | The march took place on the route Union Square – Heroes' Avenue – Avram Iancu Square – 21 December 1989 Boulevard – Union Square. |
| Slovakia | Bratislava | 100 | | Stará Tržnice - Jakubovo námestie |
| South Africa | Cape Town | | | Observatory Swimming Pool, Willow Rd - Cape Town Science Centre |
| South Africa | Durban | 200 | | The march started at city hall and ended at the South African Research Council. Organizers encouraged women and young participants to pursue work in scientific fields. |
| South Korea | Busan | several dozen | | A group of enthusiastic scientists gathered at the Korean War Veterans Memorial statue, conducted some group chants, and marched around the perimeter of the park. |
| South Korea | Seoul | 1,000 | | Organizers set up fifteen educational booths in front of the Sejong Center for the Performing Arts to communicate information about various scientific fields, including biology and robotics. Ten speeches were given starting at 2 pm. At 3 pm, protestors marched from the Sejong Center to the Gwanghwamun district and back. |
| Spain | Barcelona | 600+ | | At Scientists Dating Forum (SciDF), a roundtable discussion was held that included journalists, scientists and science policy officials. A "pro-science manifesto" was read in Spanish, Catalan, and English. |
| Spain | Madrid | few hundred | | |
| Spain | Seville | hundreds | | |
| Sweden | Gothenburg | 1,000 | | Gustav Adolfs Torg - Götaplatsen |
| Sweden | Luleå | 100+ | | Gula paviljongen |
| Sweden | Stockholm | 2,500+ | | Mariatorget - Medborgarplatsen |
| Sweden | Umeå | 300 | | Umevatoriet at Umestans business park - Renmarkstorget |
| Sweden | Uppsala | 200+ | | Stora Torget - Ångström Laboratory |
| Switzerland | Geneva | 600 | | |
| Uganda | Kampala | 70 - 84 | | |
| Ukraine | Kyiv | ~100 | | Shevchenko Park - Maidan |
| United Kingdom | Bristol | 2,500 | | Bristol Planetarium in Millennium Square - two-mile march loop through the city (Park St) |
| United Kingdom | Cardiff | few hundred | | The Senedd building, Cardiff Bay - Techniquest Science Discovery Centre |
| United Kingdom | Edinburgh | 2,000+ | Edinburgh | Waterloo Place - Scottish Parliament |
| United Kingdom | London | 10,000 | London | Marching took place between the Science Museum and Parliament Square. Jon Butterworth called the issue "not very partisan" in the UK. Doctor Who actor Peter Capaldi joined the march. |
| United Kingdom | Manchester | 300 | | Protestors assembled in Albert Square outside Manchester Town Hall. |
| Vietnam | Ho Chi Minh City | 6 | | |

=== International gallery ===
German "March for Science" cities in Periodic table form

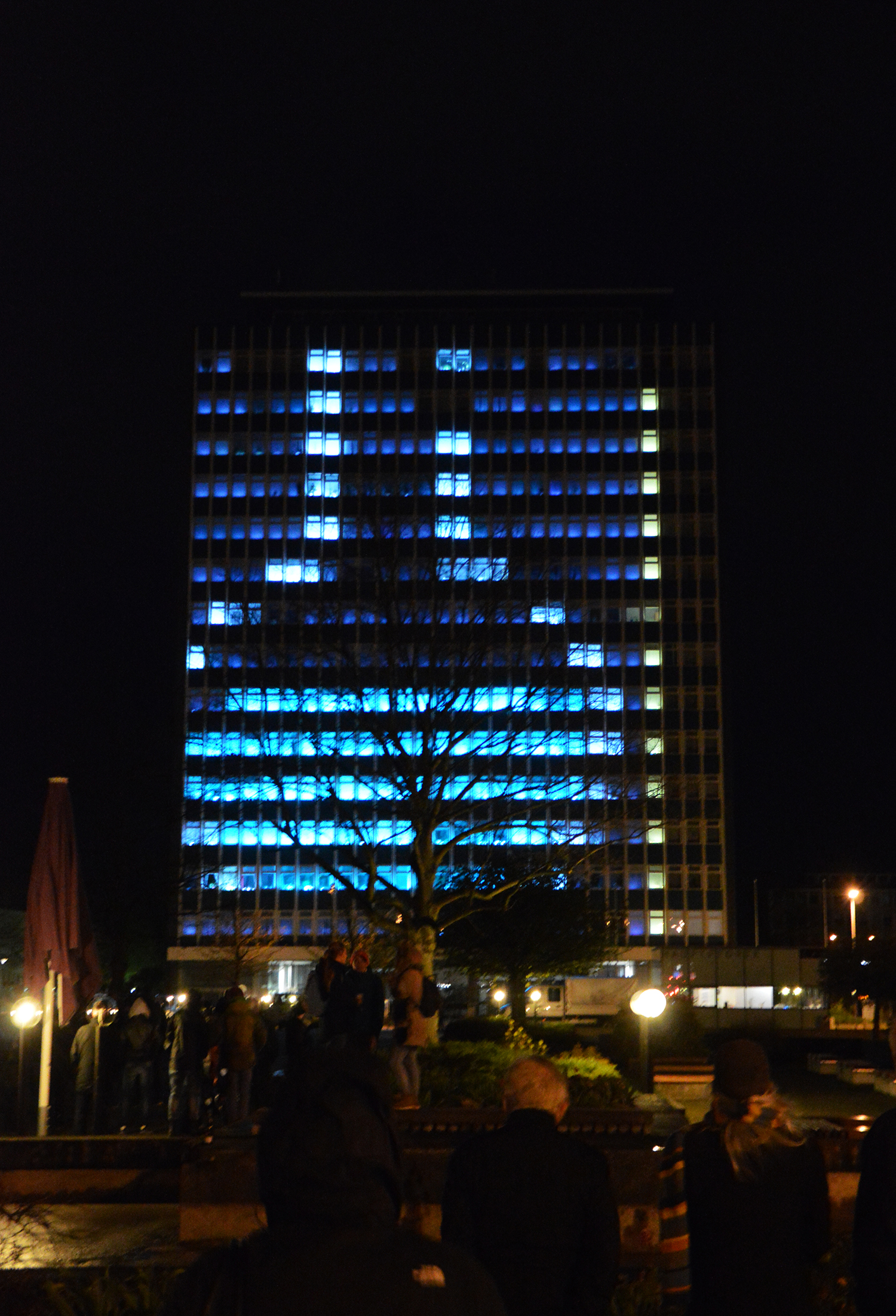
Kiel

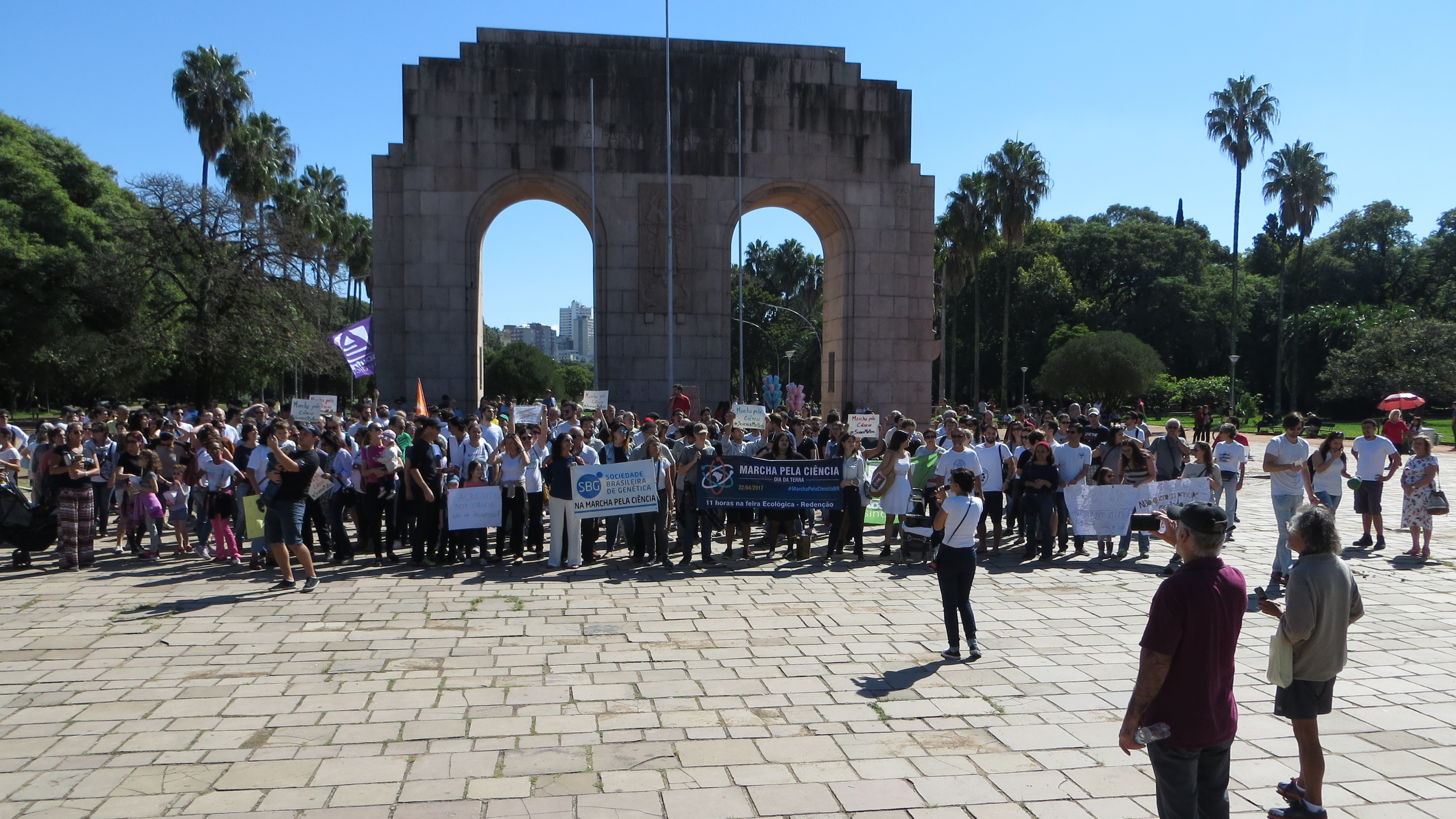
Porto Alegre

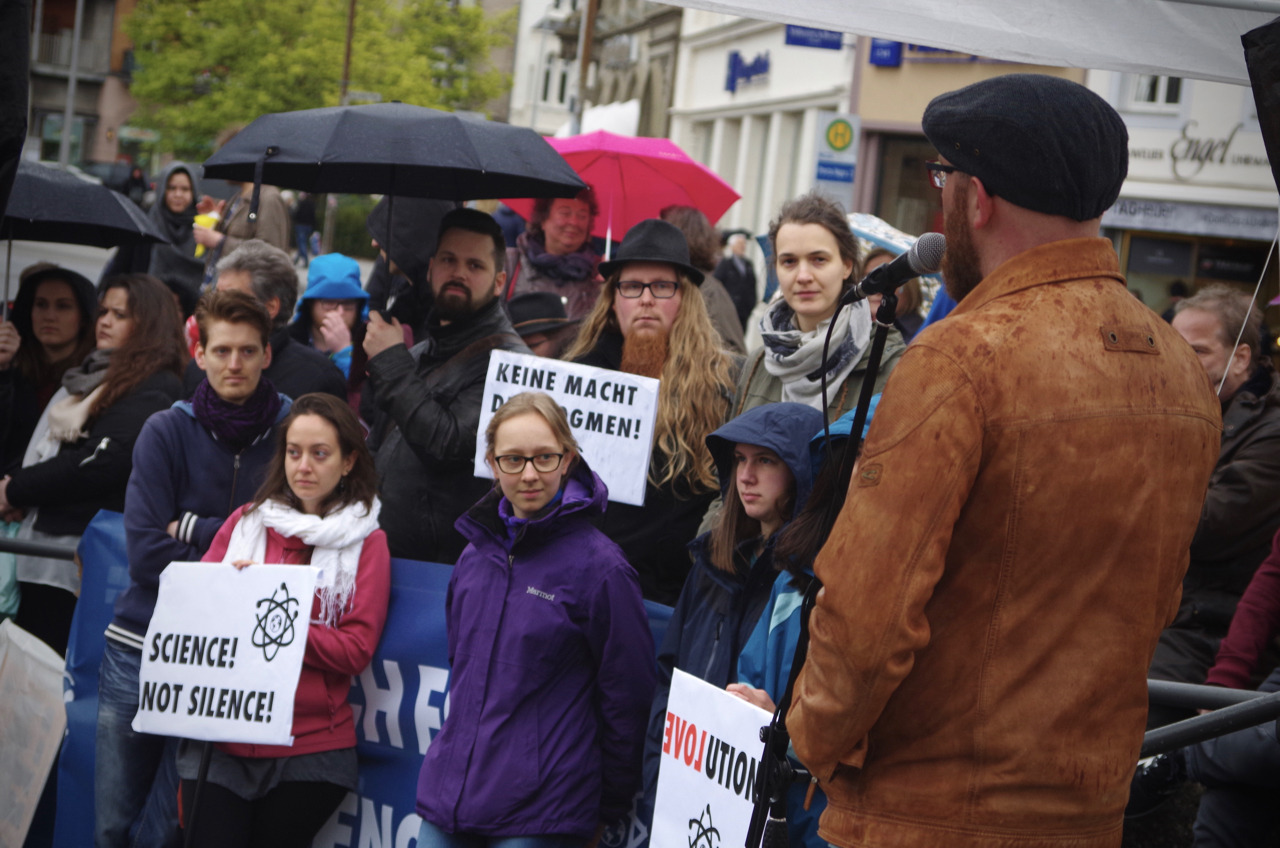
Trier

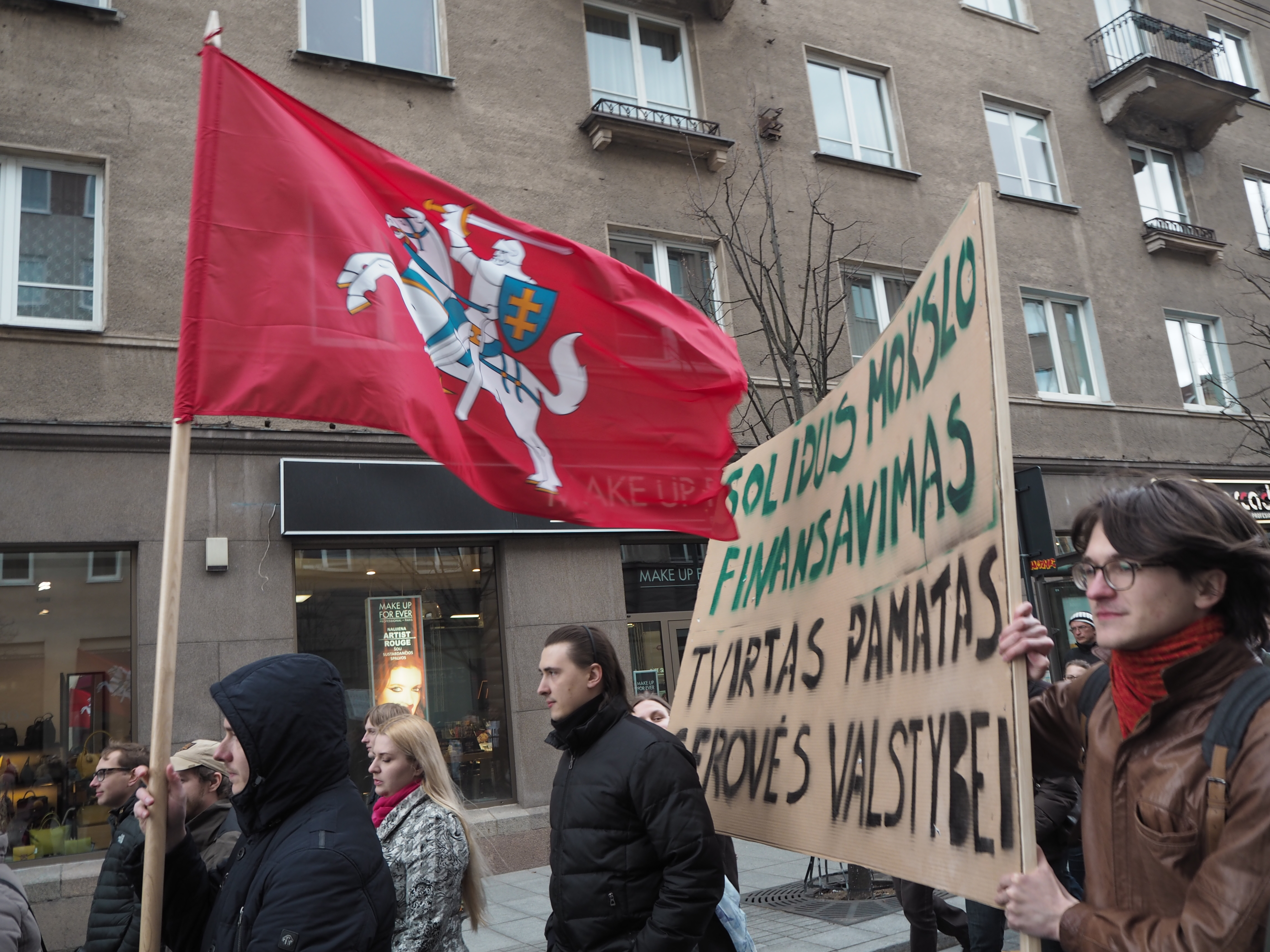
Vilnius
