= Scienceworks =

Scienceworks may refer to:

- Scienceworks (Melbourne), a science museum in Australia
- ScienceWorks Museum (Ashland, Oregon), a children's museum in the United States
