= Palace of Justice, Cluj-Napoca =

- Palatul de Justiţie
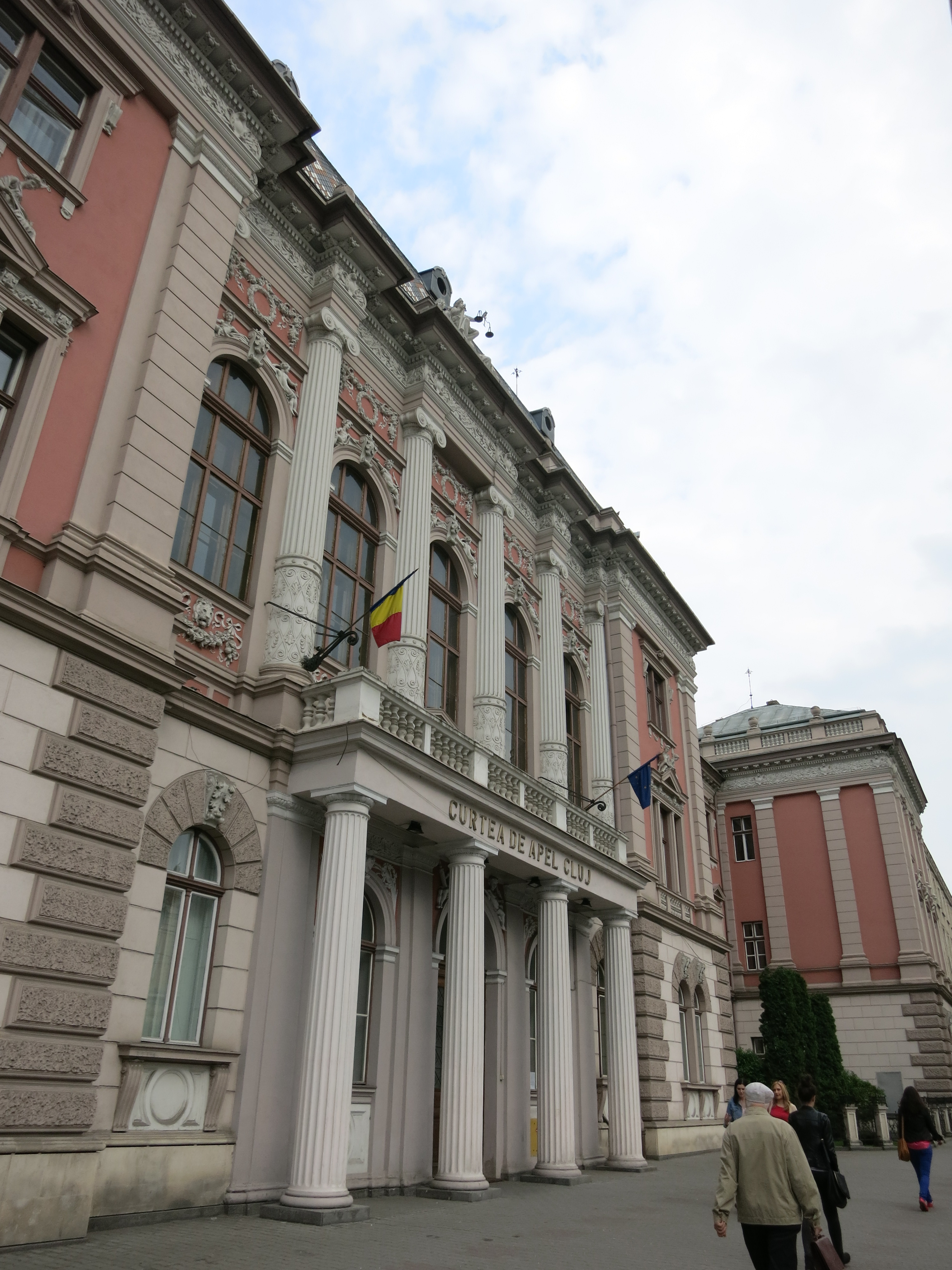
- Court of Appeal entrance (western façade)
- Interactive map of the Palace of Justice, Cluj-Napoca area
- Alternative names: Curtea de Apel; Tribunalul

General information
- Architectural style: Eclectic
- Location: Cluj-Napoca, Romania, Ştefan cel Mare Square (Court of Appeal); 2 Dorobanţilor Way (Courthouse)
- Coordinates: 46°46′15″N 23°35′55″E
- Current tenants: Cluj Court of Appeal; Cluj Tribunal
- Construction started: 1898
- Completed: 1902
- Owner: Ministry of Justice

Design and construction
- Architect: Gyula Wagner
- Architecture firm: Epitotarsasag, Kotsis, Smiel, Fodor es Reisinger

The Palace of Justice in Cluj-Napoca, on Dorobanţilor Street, no.2, is an eclectic structure, built between 1898 and 1902, after the plans of the association Epitotarsasag, Kotsis, Smiel, Fodor es Reisinger. The Palace, with a total area of 19,950 m^{2} (214,700 sq ft), was projected by the architect Gyula Wagner.

The quadrilateral building, with its 13 inner yards is a part of the ensemble in Avram Iancu Square, together with the Romanian Opera, the CFR Palace, the Palace of the Prefecture, the Palace of Finance and the Palace of the Orthodox Metropolis.

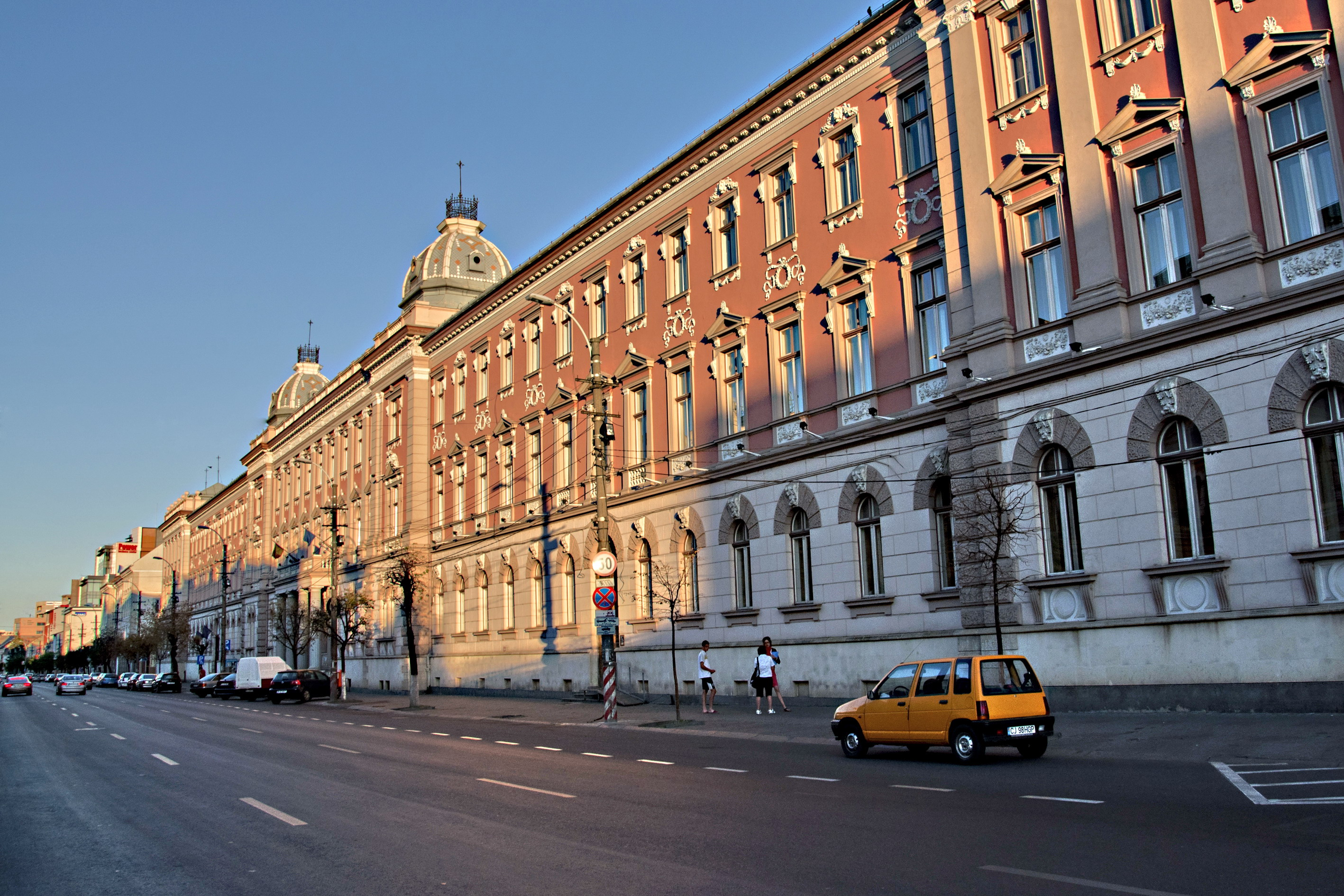
View from Ștefan cel Mare Square

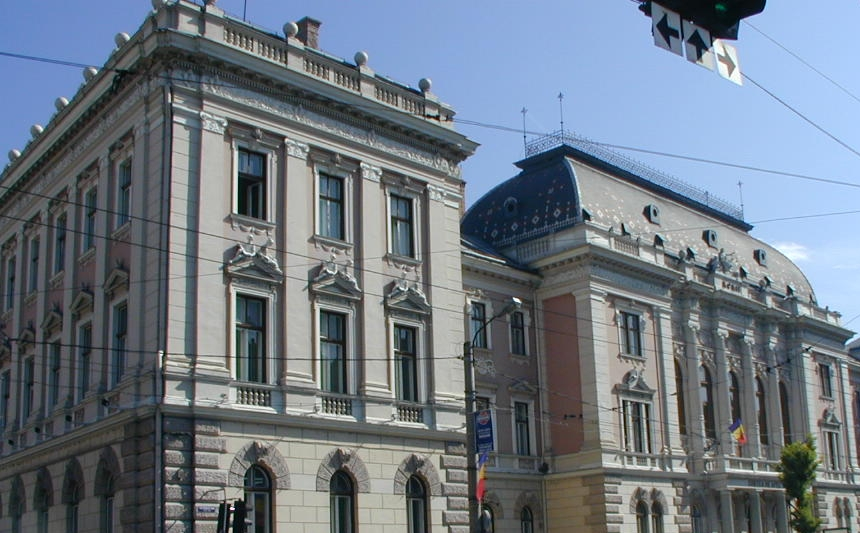
Court of Appeal entrance

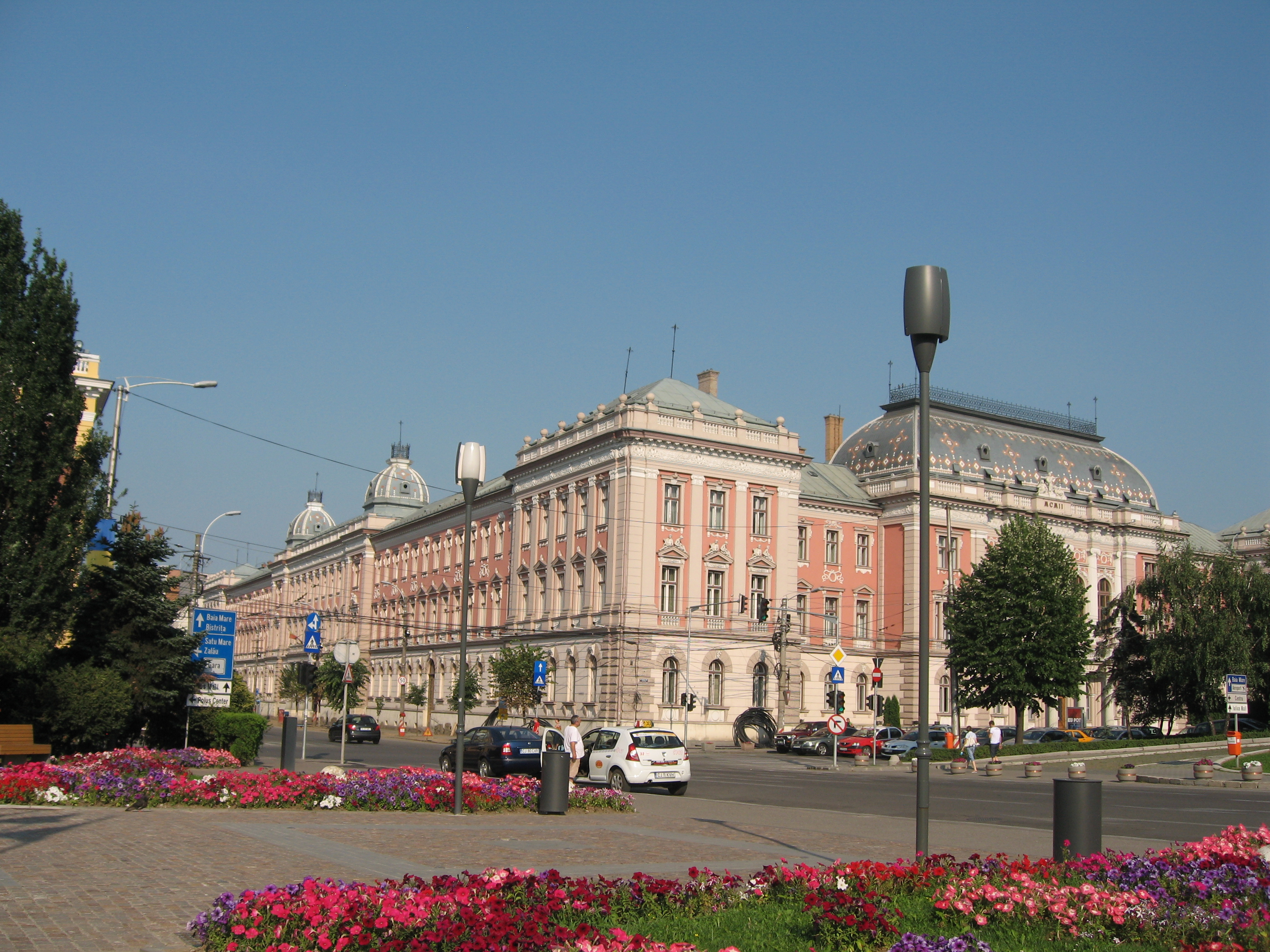
The building in 2009
