= Avram Iancu Square, Cluj-Napoca =

Square in Cluj-Napoca, Romania

Coordinates: 46°46′18″N 23°35′47″E

Avram Iancu Square (named after the Transylvanian Romanian lawyer and revolutionary Avram Iancu) is a central plaza in the Romanian city of Cluj-Napoca. It is connected to the Unirii Square through the Eroilor and "21 Decembrie 1989" avenues. It is also connected to Mihai Viteazul Square through Cuza Vodă Street. Its most prominent building is the Dormition of the Theotokos Cathedral, although the plaza also houses the Wagner Gyula's eclectic Palace of Justice, the Lucian Blaga National Theatre and the headquarters of the Cluj County Prefecture.

== Gallery ==
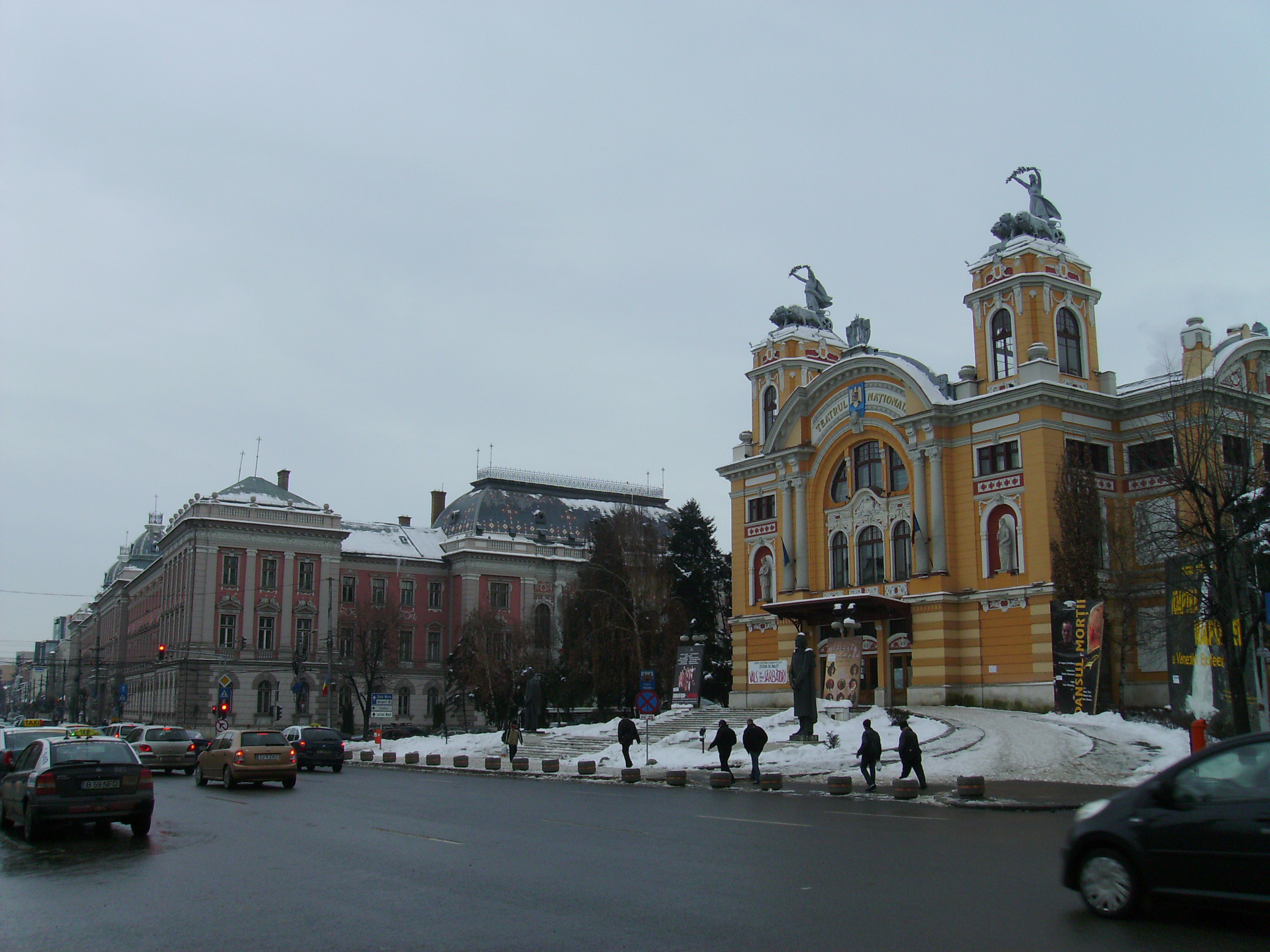

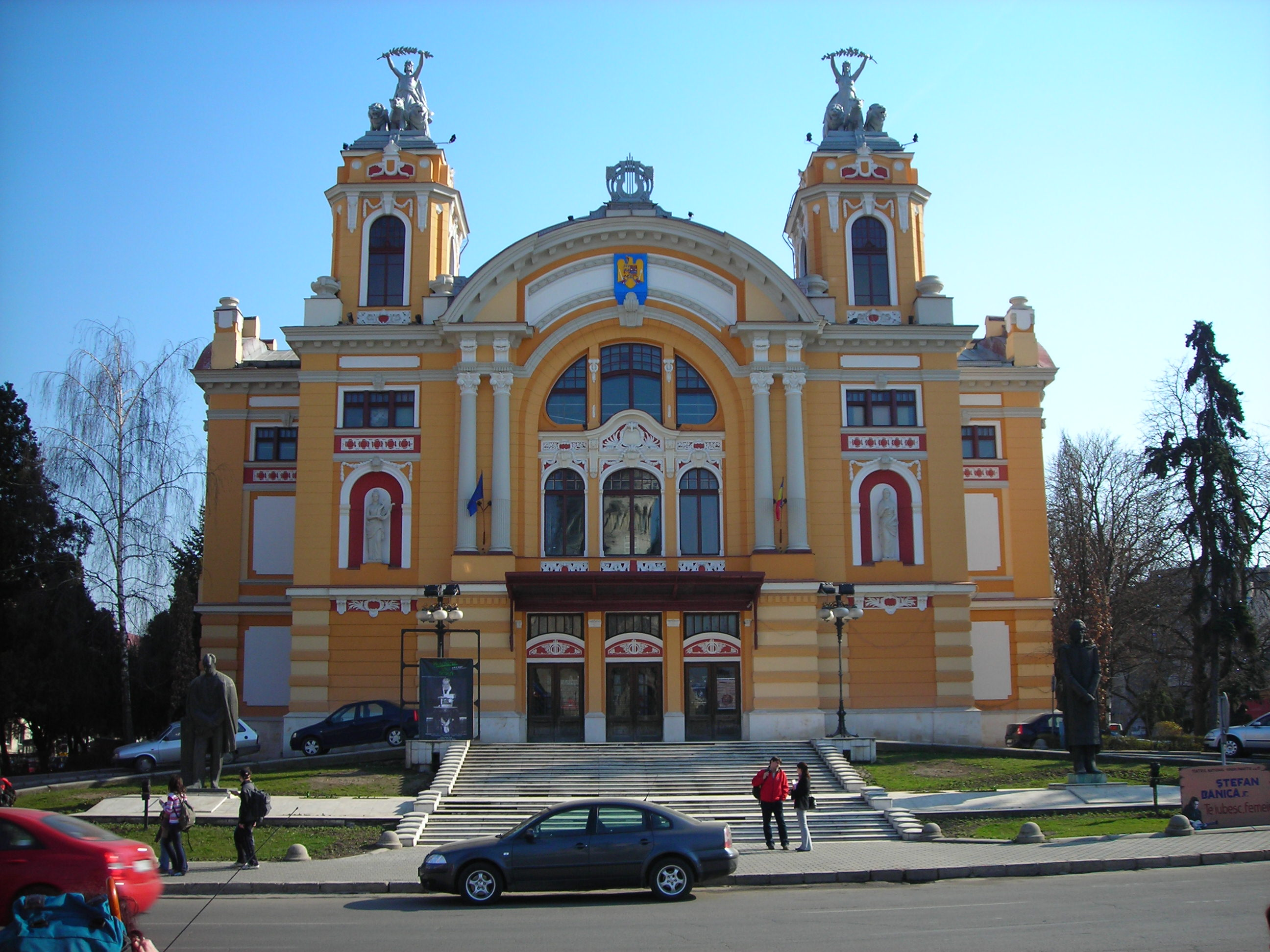
Lucian Blaga National Theatre

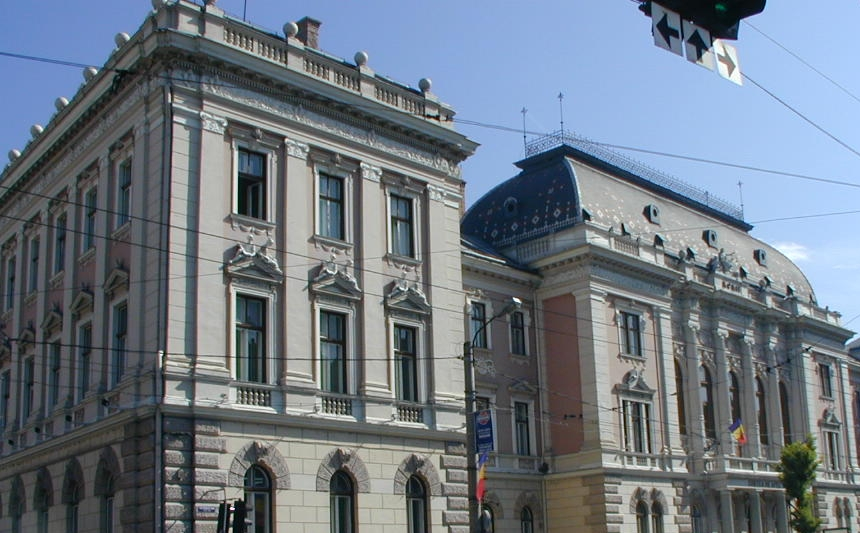
Palace of Justice
