= Cluj County Prefecture =

Building in Cluj-Napoca, Romania

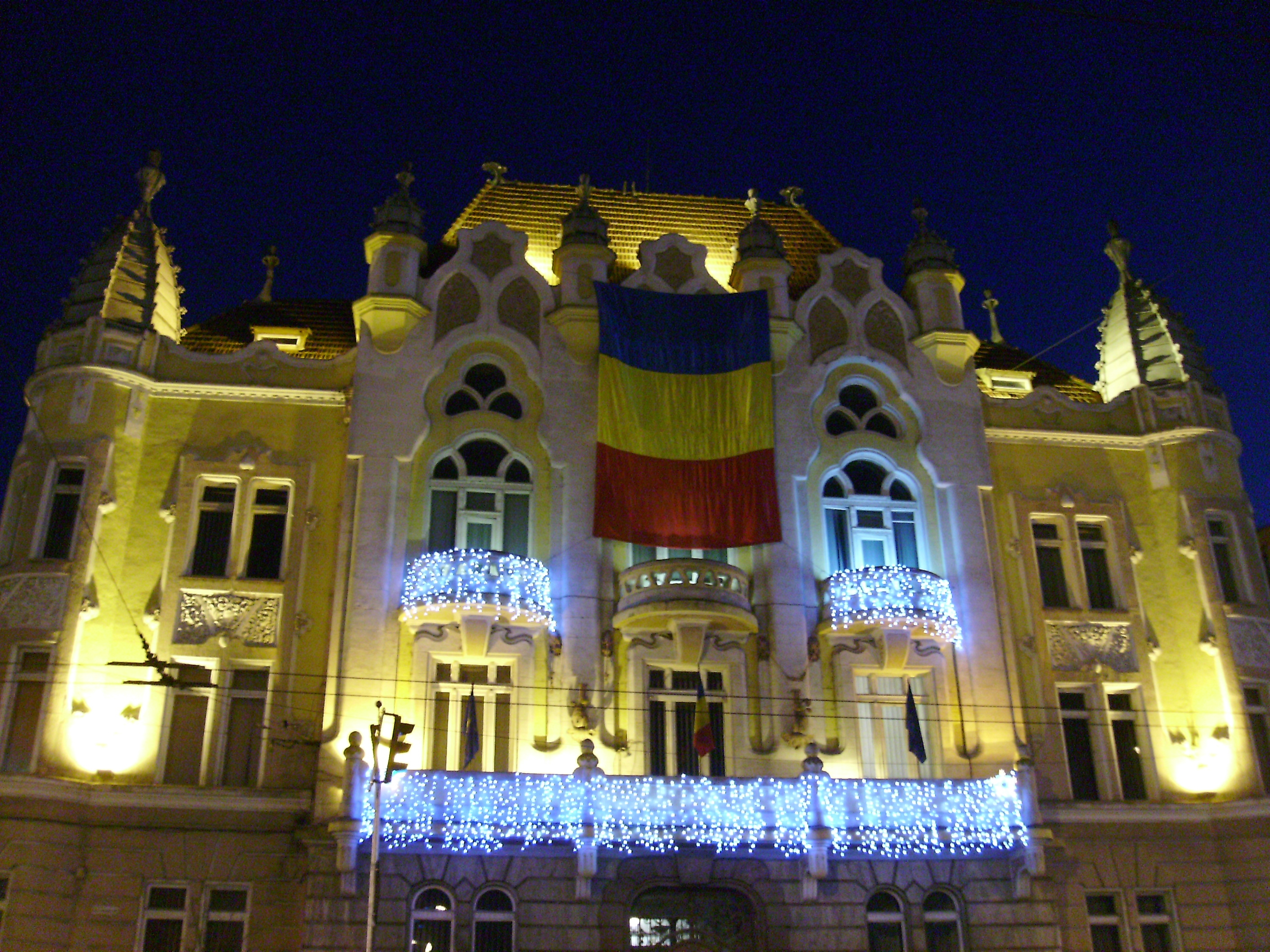
Cluj County Prefecture

The Cluj County Prefecture (Romanian: Palatul Prefecturii din Cluj) is a building in Cluj-Napoca, Romania, housing the offices of the Cluj County prefect. It is located at 21 Decembrie 1989 Boulevard, nr. 58.

Built in 1910 according to the plans of architect József Huber, the building combines folk art elements with Gothic, Moorish Revival and Secession. Today, the offices and meeting halls are in a more classical style without extravagant touches. Between 1910 and 1940, the building housed the Chamber of Commerce and Industry. During the Communist period, it was the city hall as well as the local Romanian Communist Party headquarters. It has been the prefecture since 1992.

Romania's Culture Ministry classifies the building as a historic monument.
