= March for Science Seattle =

2017 protest in Seattle, Washington, U.S.

- Part of Protests against Donald Trump
- Date: April 22, 2017
- Location: Seattle, Washington, U.S.
- Type: Protest march
- Participants: Tens of thousands

The March for Science Seattle (or March for Science–Seattle) was a protest held in Seattle, in the U.S. state of Washington. This local protest was part of the March for Science, a series of rallies and marches in Washington, D.C., and over 600 cities across the world on April 22, 2017 (Earth Day).

Hundreds attended a second March for Science event in Seattle in 2018.

== Local organizers ==
Miles Greb was among local organizers of the event, which "promoted the use of scientific knowledge and peer review as a basis for public policy, economics, public health and more", according to Seattle University's student publication The Spectator. The Nature Conservancy was a sponsor of the demonstration.

== Demonstration ==
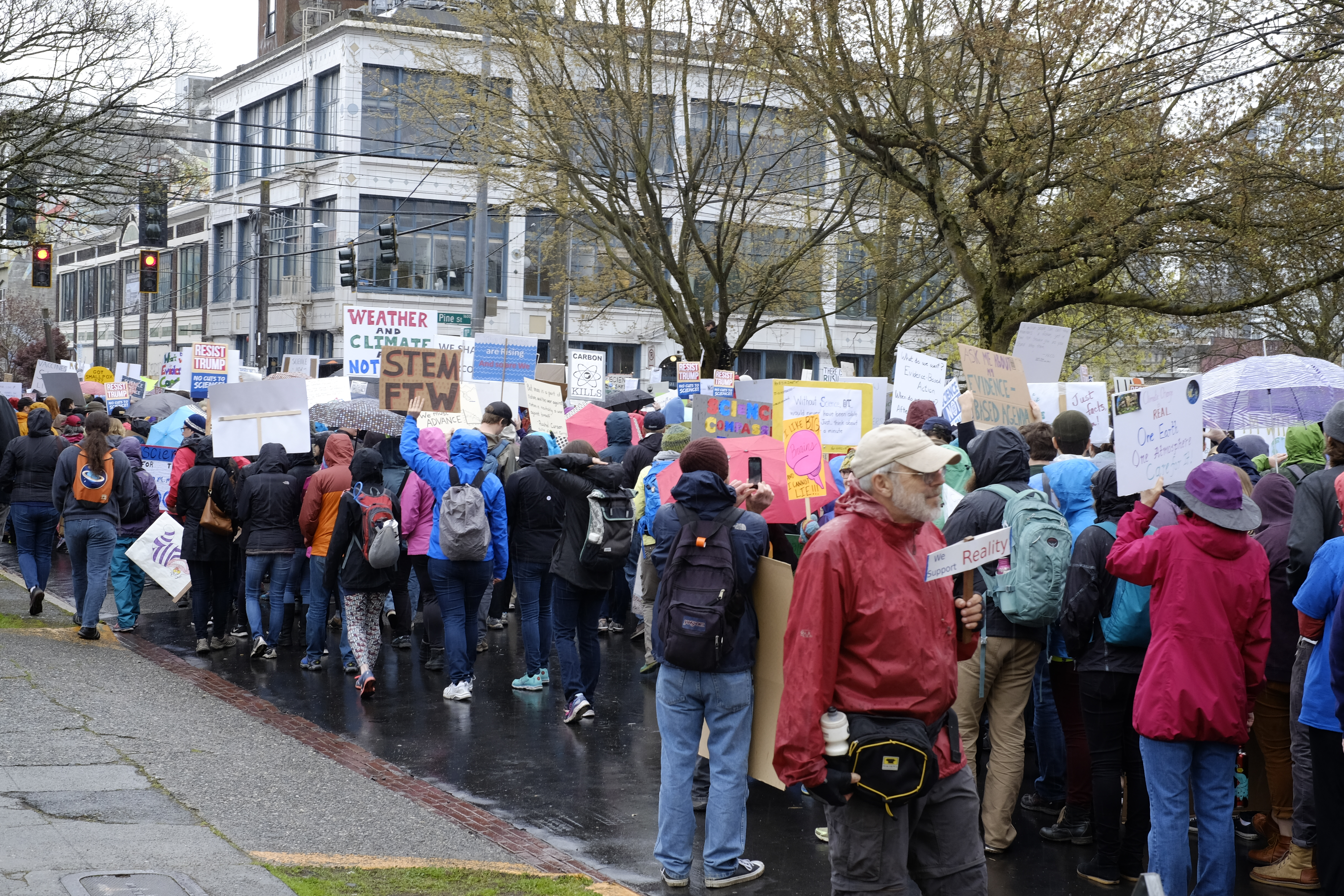
Event participants at Cal Anderson Park

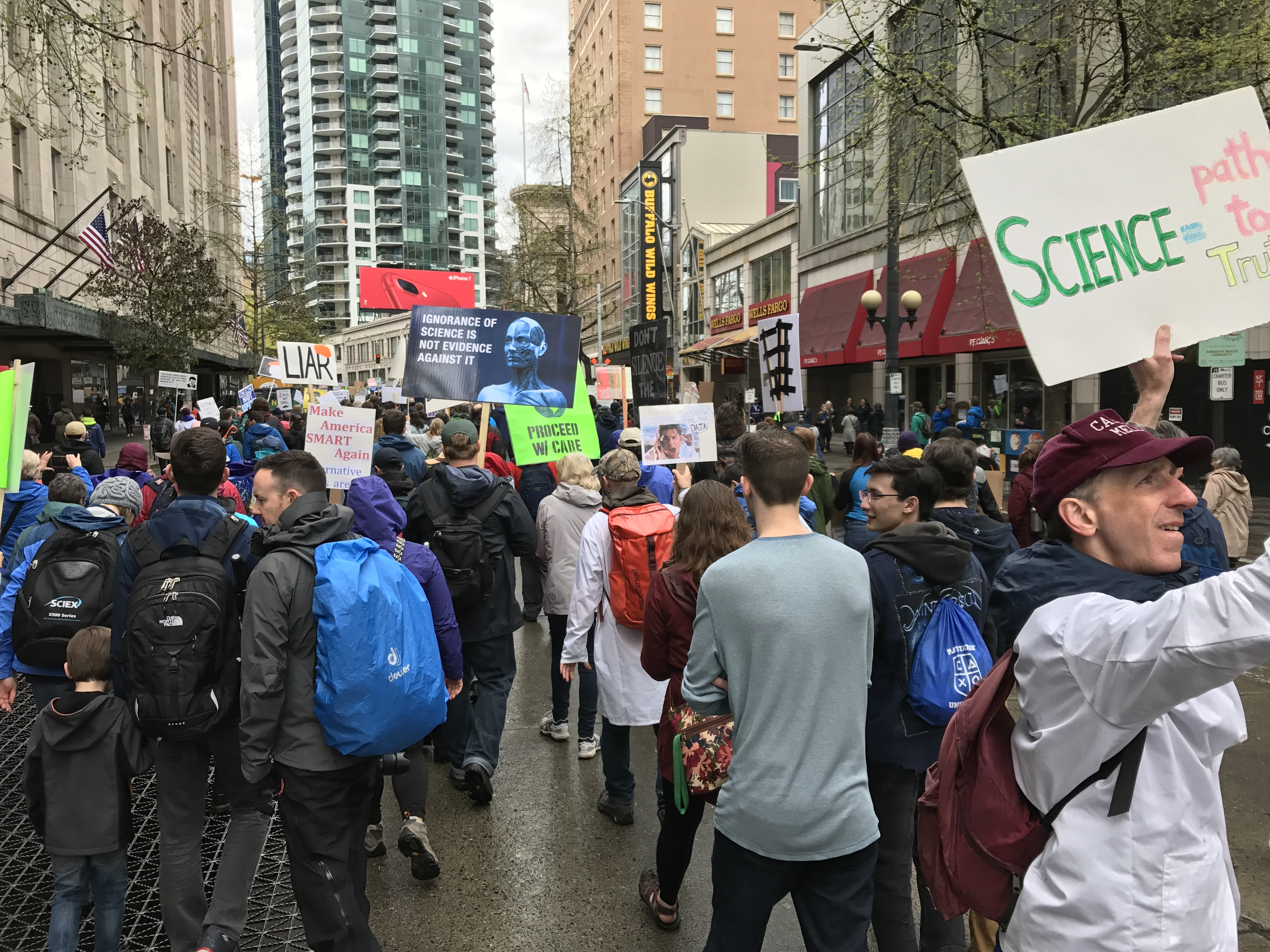
Demonstration participants

Thousands of people signed up to attend the event. Protesters gathered at Cal Anderson Park on Capitol Hill and marched to the International Fountain at Seattle Center. Tens of thousands participated in the demonstration. Governor Jay Inslee, congresswoman Suzan DelBene, and Mayor Ed Murray spoke on site.

University of Washington physics student Tyler Valentine was among speakers. Biochemist Edmond H. Fischer was among participants. Groups from the University of Washington's Department of Global Health and Seattle Pacific University's biology department also attended.

The crowd was diverse and many people created homemade signs. Erik Lacitis of the Yakima Herald-Republic wrote: "College students, doctors in their white coats, parents with baby strollers, your gray-haired liberal types all marched... In Seattle, they held up homemade signs: 'Climate change is real.' 'No 'alternative facts' in real science.' 'There is no Planet B.' 'Funding science is patriotic.' 'Mr. President, science gave us Rogaine.'

One protester who "stormed" the stage was removed by police.

== 2018 ==
Another March for Science event was held in Seattle on April 14, 2018. Stacy Smedley and Teresa Swanson were among local organizers. According to The Seattle Times, the 2018 event was more about indigenous rights, national politics, and public education. Demonstrators gathered at Cal Anderson Park, then marched along Pike Street, Fourth Avenue, and Fifth Avenue North to the Seattle Center. Speakers included Pramila Jayapal, Nancy Pelosi, and environmental scientist Marco Hatch. The event's theme was "Science's Silenced Voices". The Nature Conservancy of Washington was a returning sponsor. Hundreds participated.
