= Eroilor Avenue, Cluj-Napoca =

Street in Cluj-Napoca, Romania

Coordinates: 46.7694°N 23.5917°E

Eroilor Avenue ("Heroes' Avenue") is a central avenue in Cluj-Napoca, Romania, connecting the Avram Iancu and Unirii squares. The northern side of the avenue was converted during the late 2000s into a pedestrian zone.

In the late 19th century and until 1919, the avenue was called Deák Ferenc utca. During the interwar era, the street was called Regina Maria, after Queen Mary of Romania; during the communist era it was named after Petru Groza, a Romanian prime-minister of that time.

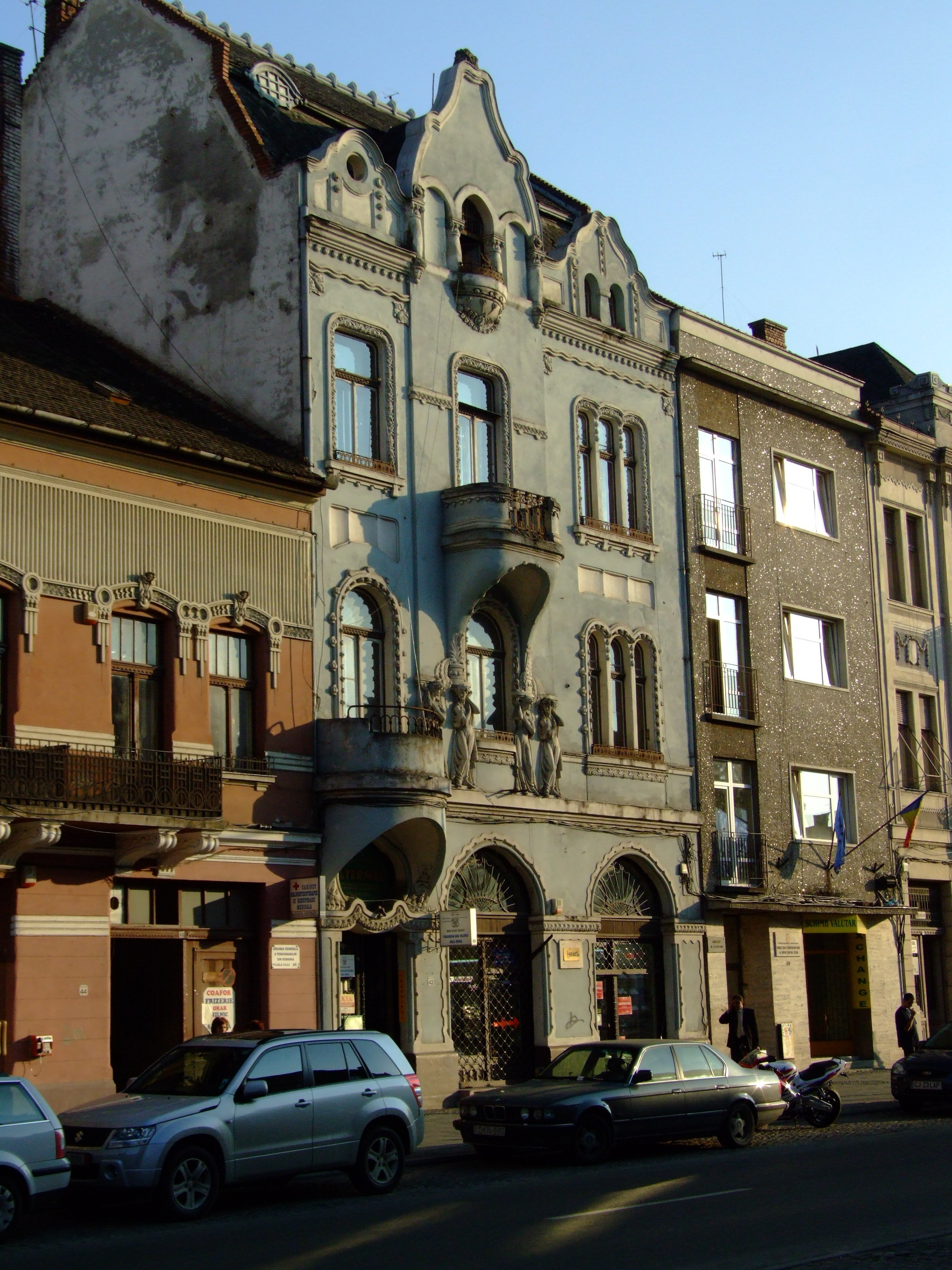
Buildings on the Eroilor Avenue

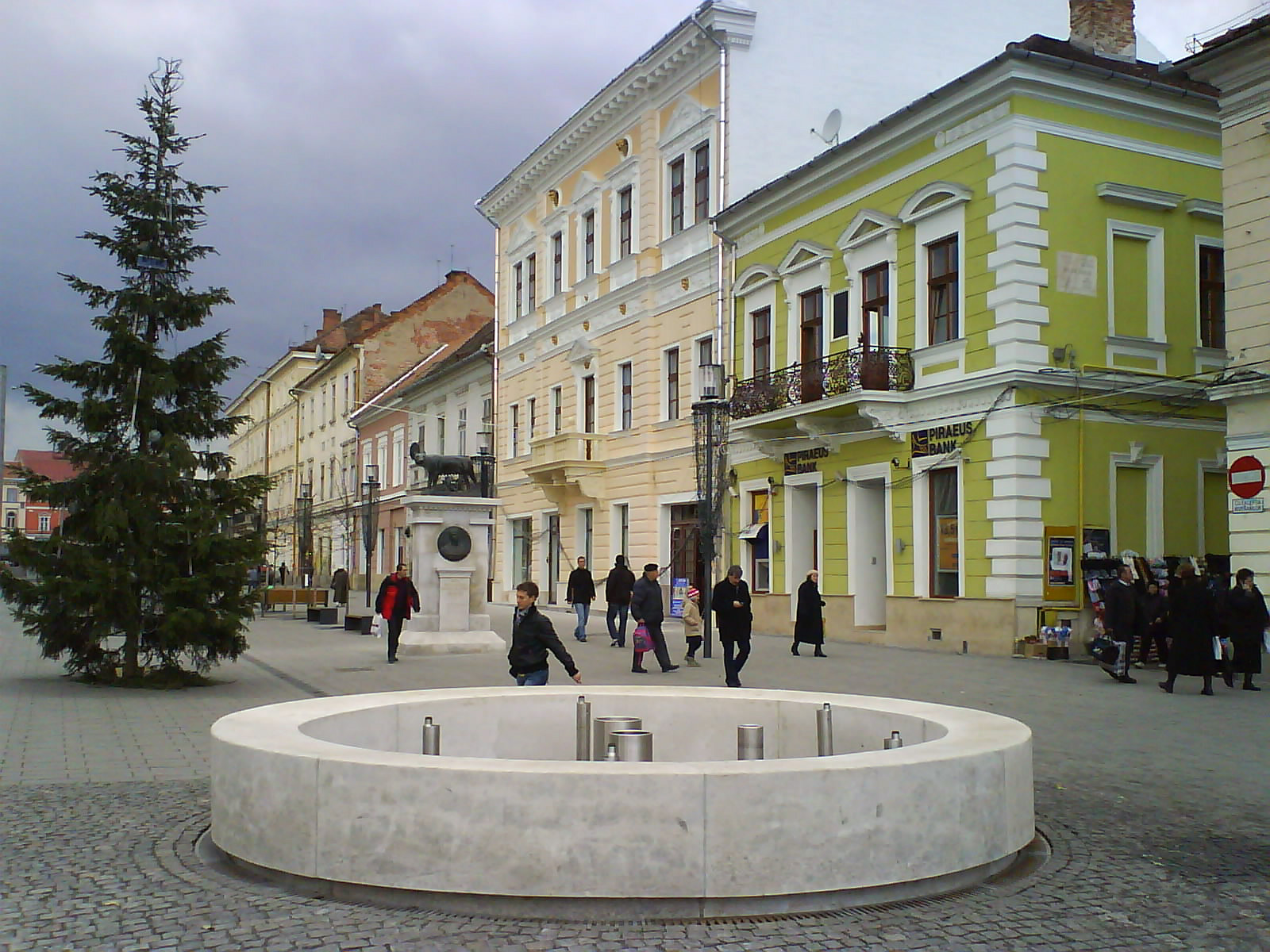
The pedestrian area on Eroilor Boulevard in Cluj-Napoca, with the Capitoline Wolf Statue and the János Bolyai house (the green building)

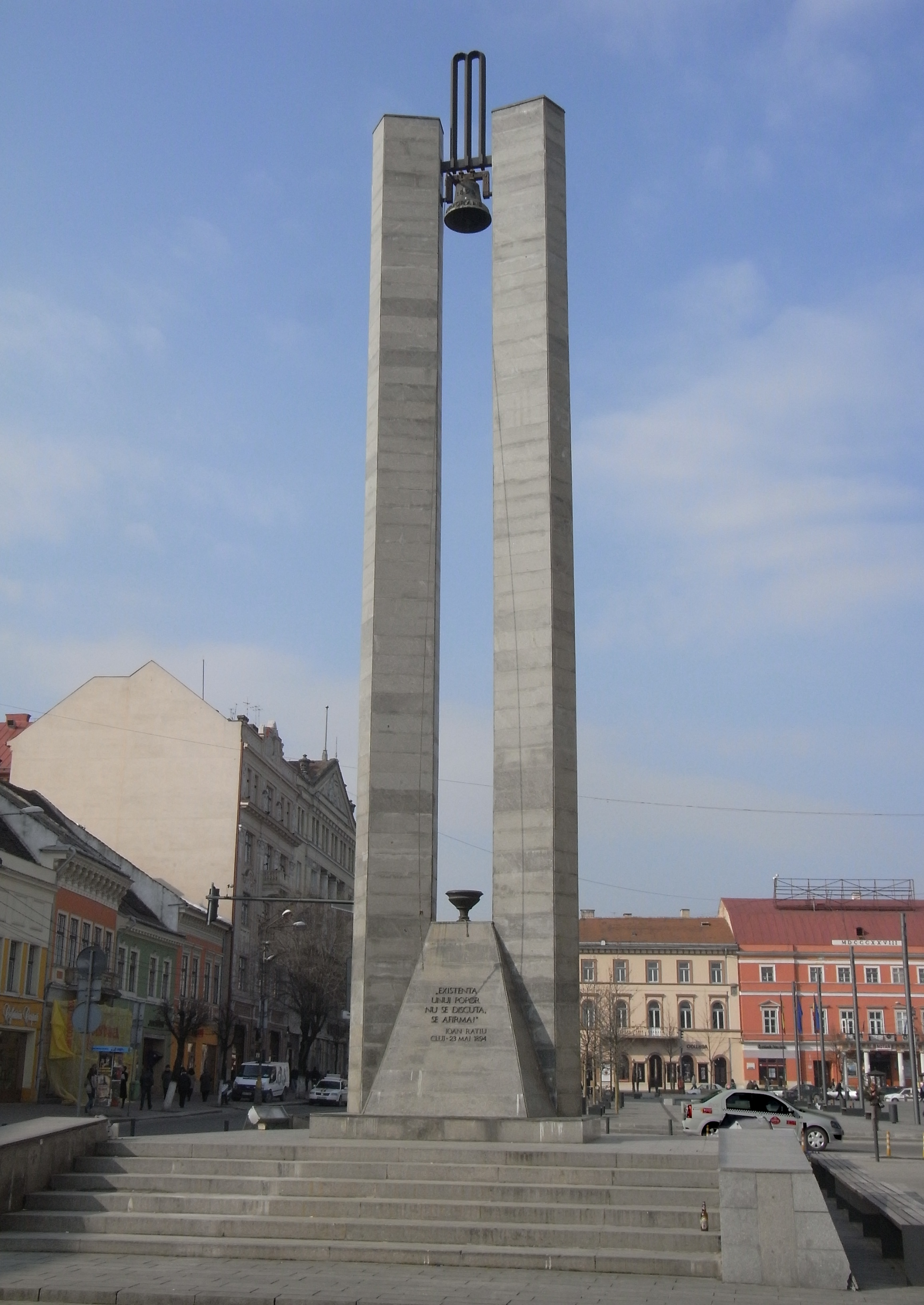
Transylvanian Memorandum monument
