= ScienceWorks Museum (Ashland, Oregon) =

Science museum in Ashland, Oregon, USA

Coordinates: 42.193397°N 122.688862°W

ScienceWorks Hands-On Museum
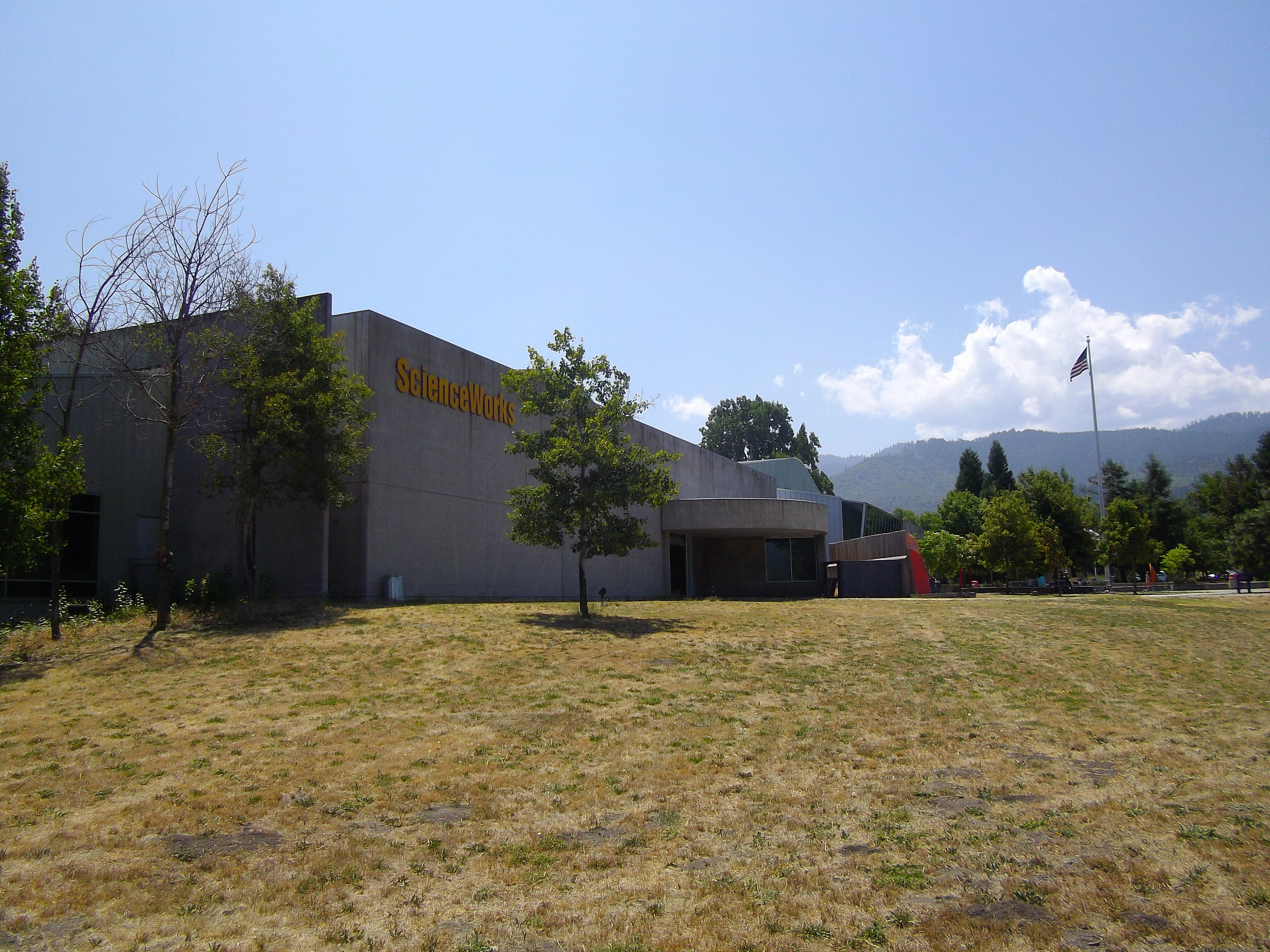
- Established: 2001
- Location: Ashland, Oregon, United States
- Type: private: science, industry
- Visitors: 55,000 visitors per year

ScienceWorks Hands-On Museum in Ashland, Oregon, is a science museum, founded as a non-profit organization in 2001 by a small group of families. The goal was to use an existing 26,000 sq. ft. building to create an interactive science center, to serve the region's schools toward Oregon State science standards. Over 100 hands-on exhibits were built, both in the Museum's shop and by volunteers. Programs were developed, including: field trips for school children, summer camps, live science demonstrations, and weekend themed programming.

ScienceWorks' school programs serve 16 counties and 24 school districts in Southern Oregon and Northern California with field trips and classroom outreach. 57% of the schools served are low-income, Title I schools., and 78% of students are from rural areas. In 2017-2018, all 1,000 Medford School District third-graders visited ScienceWorks. In total, over 9,000 school children benefit from the Museum's school programs each year.

ScienceWorks designs and constructs exhibits to display on-site and to travel to other museums. These exhibits include "Take Flight," "Sportsology" and "Noise!" The latest exhibit designed and constructed in the Museum's shop is "Pterosaurs: Ancient Rulers of the Sky."
