= Károly Kós =

Hungarian architect (1883–1977)

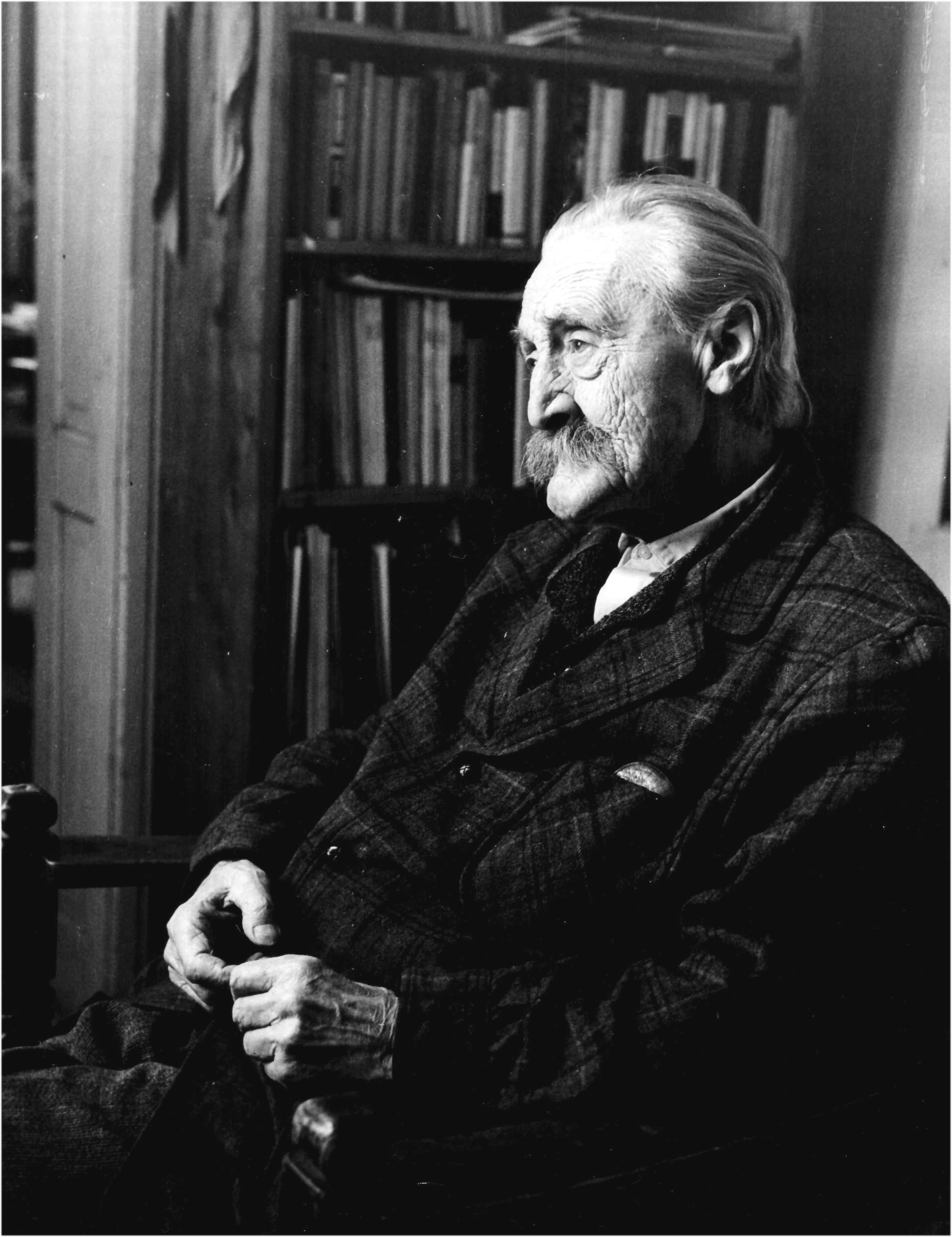
- Born: Károly Kosch; 16 December 1883; Temesvár, Hungary (today Timișoara, Romania)
- Died: 25 August 1977; Cluj-Napoca, Romania
- Citizenship: Hungarian; Romanian
- Education: Technical University of Budapest
- Occupation: Architect
- Spouse: Ida Balázs
- Children: 4

Member of the Assembly of Deputies
- In office 1946–1948

Personal details
- Party: Hungarian People's Union

Károly Kós (Hungarian pronunciation: [ˈkaːroj ˈkoːʃ], born Károly Kosch; 16 December 1883 – 25 August 1977) was a Hungarian architect, writer, illustrator, ethnologist and politician of Hungary and Romania.

== Biography ==
Born as Károly Kosch in Temesvár, Austria-Hungary (now Timișoara, Romania). His great-grandfather, Koos, was a Magyar peasant who assimilated into the Saxon community. He studied engineering at the Royal University of Technology József, and only afterwards turned towards architecture (graduating from the Budapest Architecture School in 1907). Already during his studies and at the start of his career, he had a special interest for the historical and traditional folk architecture, and made study trips to Kalotaszeg and the Székely Land.

In 1909, his project for the Roman Catholic church in Zebegény, in 1909 the Óbuda Reformed parochial building, and in 1910 the Budapest Zoo complex (with Dezső Zrumeczky), were carried out. During the 1910s, he completed the Reformed Rooster Church in Kolozsvár (a city later known as Cluj or Cluj-Napoca) and the hospital in Sepsiszentgyörgy (Sfântu Gheorghe). At the time, his style was influenced by the Vienna Secession and Art Nouveau.

In 1914, at the start of World War I, Kós moved to Sztána (Stana). He was drafted the following year, but soon discharged on request from the Ministry of Culture. Between 1917 and 1918, he was sent on a study trip to Istanbul. In 1918, Kós was asked to be a professor of the College for Applied Arts of Budapest, but he declined, wishing to return to Transylvania.

He lived off commissions and started a political career, choosing, unlike many in the Hungarian community, to accept the Romanian Kingdom's administration in the region as a given, while engaging in active opposition inside its legal framework (and authoring a manifesto calling on others to do the same). Alongside Lajos Albrecht and others, he was one of the founders of the Transylvanian People's Party in 1921 — the group later formed the Magyar Party. Kós also edited its illustrated political journal Vasárnap.

In 1924, he and several of his friends founded a publishing house under the name Erdélyi Szépmíves Céh ("Transylvanian Guild of Fine Arts"). From 1931, he was editor of the Erdélyi Helikon, and manager of the Miklós Barabás Guild (an independent interest group of Hungarian artists in Romania).

In 1944 his house in Sztána (part of Northern Transylvania) was plundered, and he fled to Kolozsvár, where he rejoined his family. He was director of the Transylvanian Hungarian Economic Association. As a politician, he was the president of the Hungarian People's Union (Magyar Népi Szövetség, MNSz), and afterwards member of the Assembly of Deputies (1946–48).

Kós taught at the College for Agriculture in Cluj until 1953, filling the post of the dean in 1945, and contributed to the journal Világosság between 1948 and 1949. He died in Cluj.

== Buildings designed ==
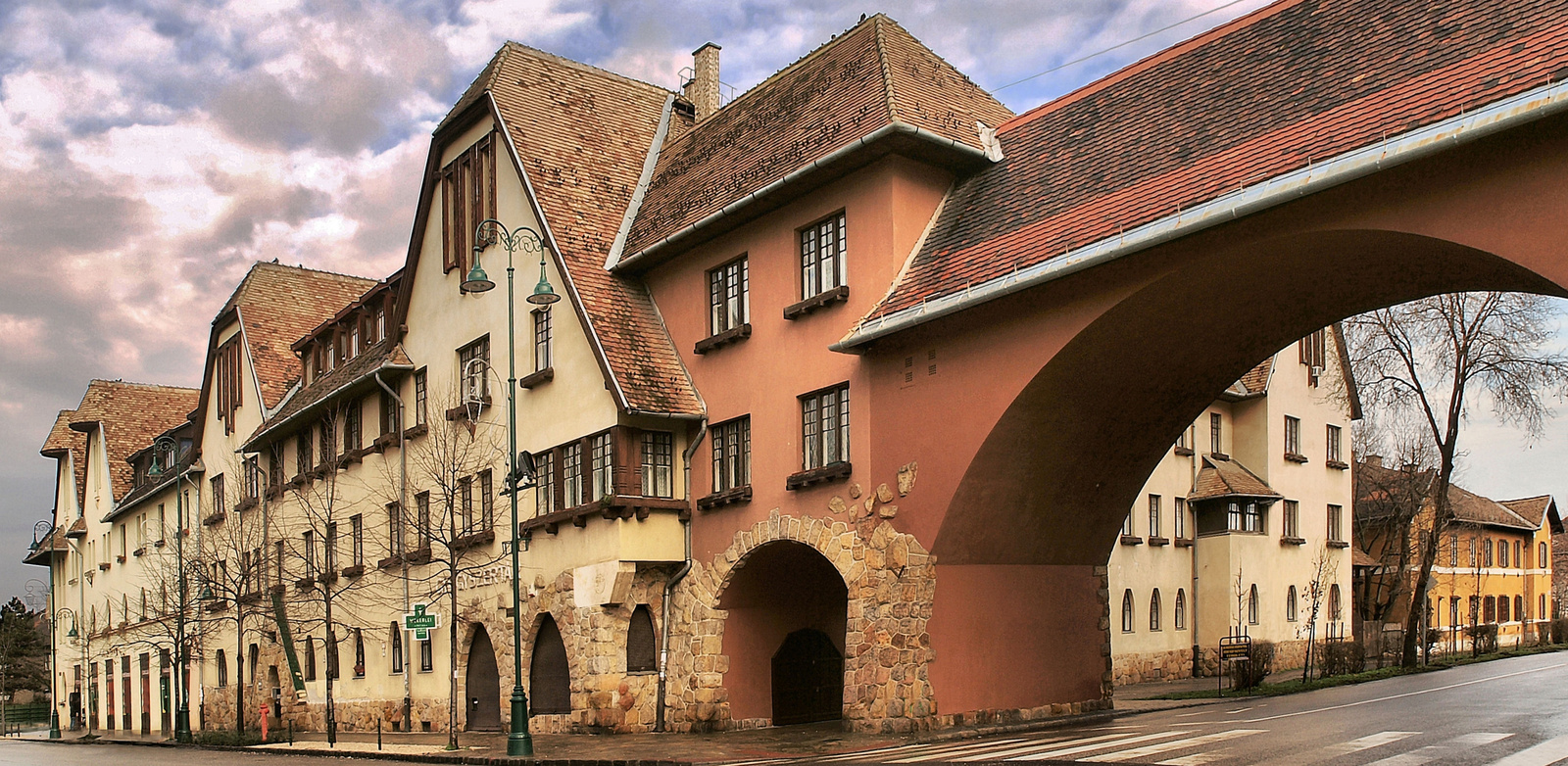
Wekerle housing estate, Budapest

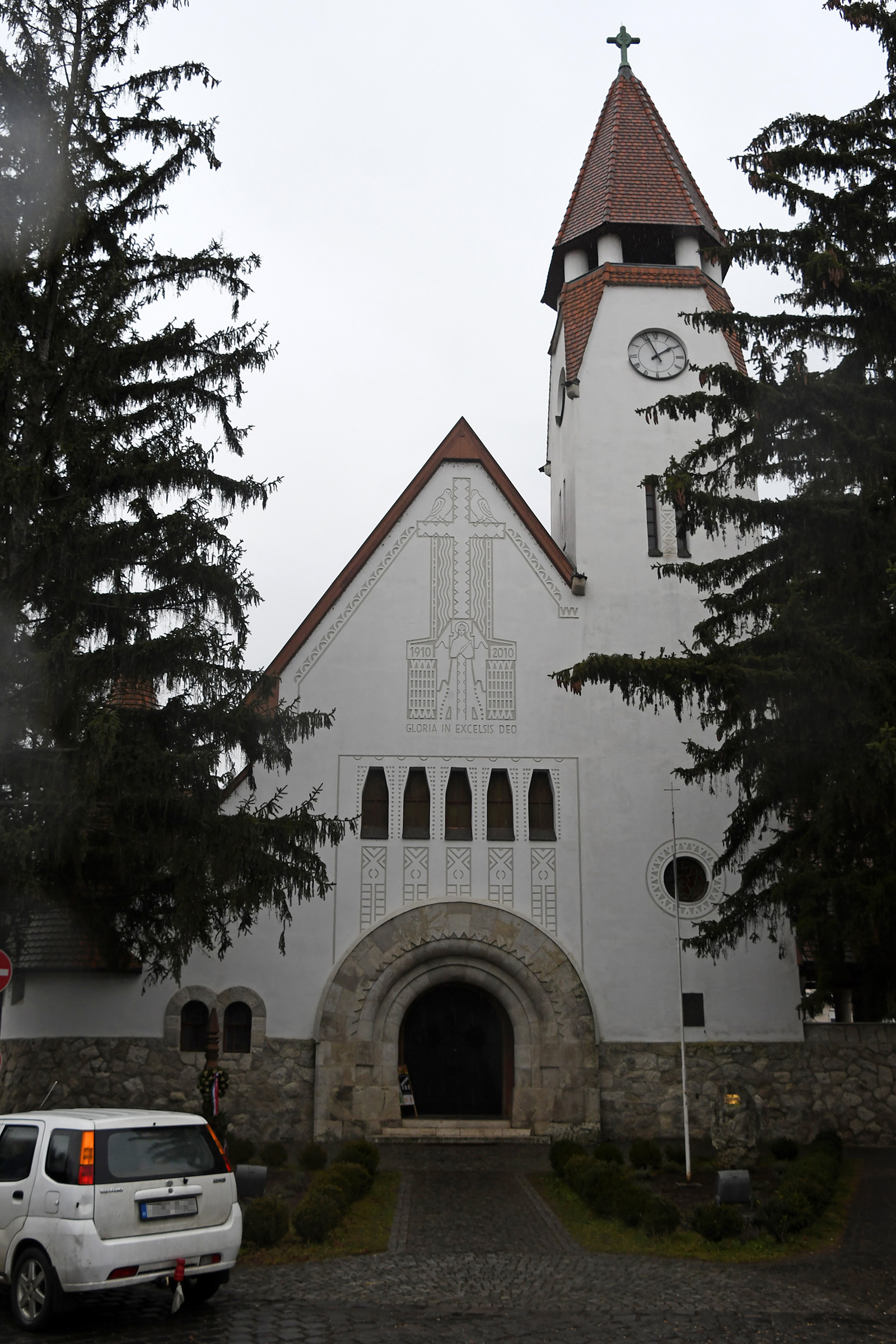
Zebegény Roman Catholic Church

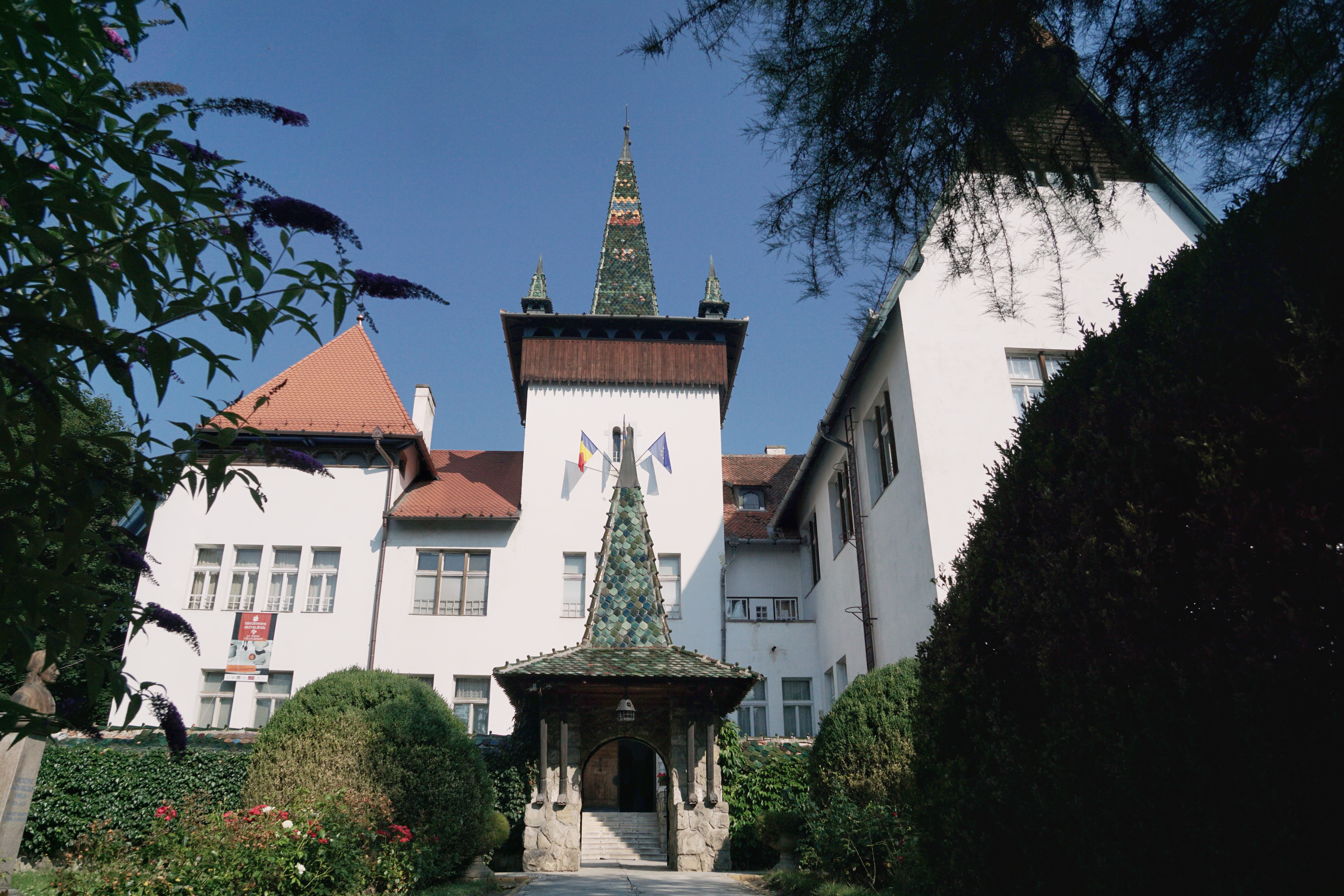
Székely National Museum in Sfântu Gheorghe

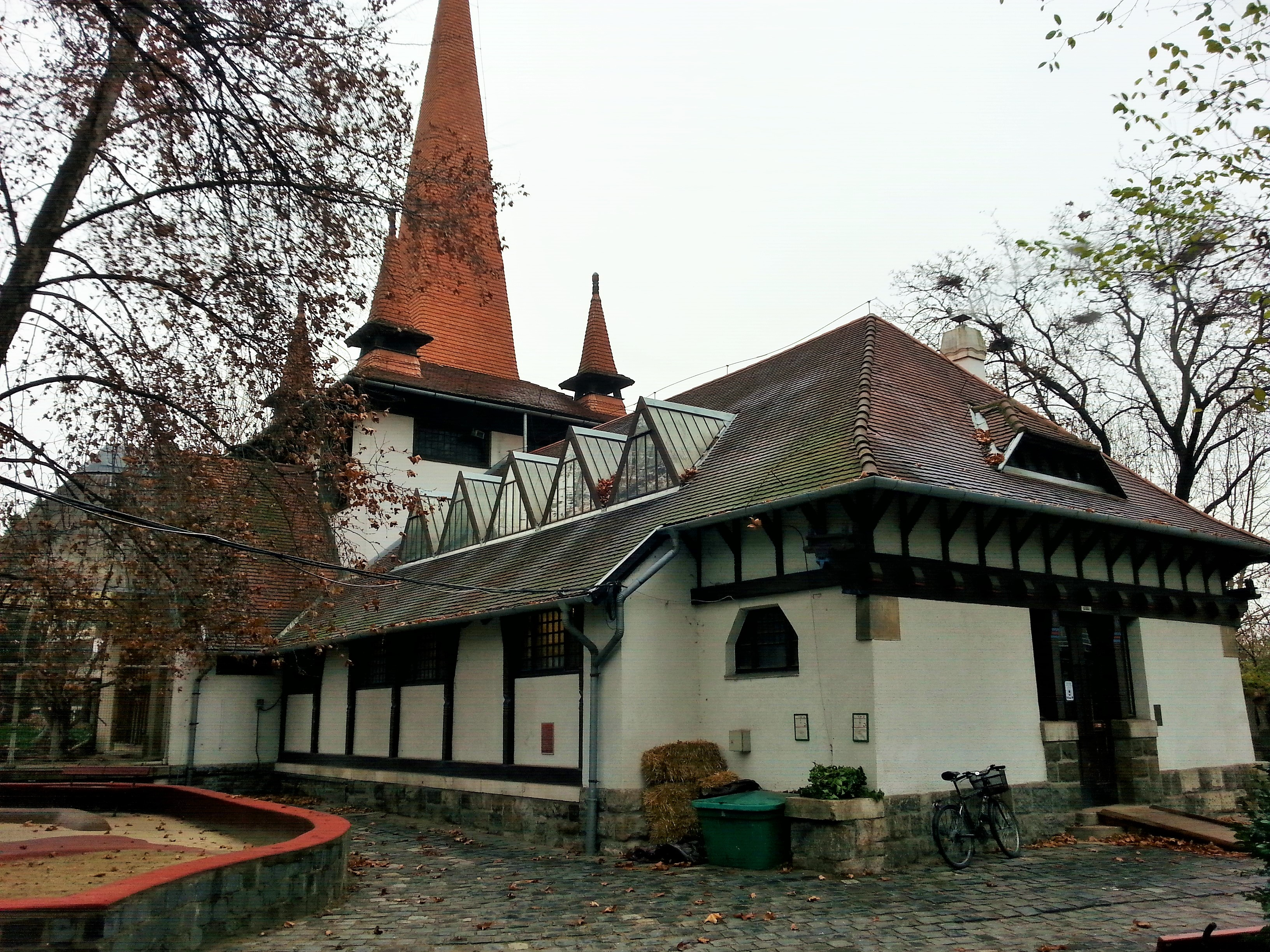
The Bird House at the Budapest Zoo

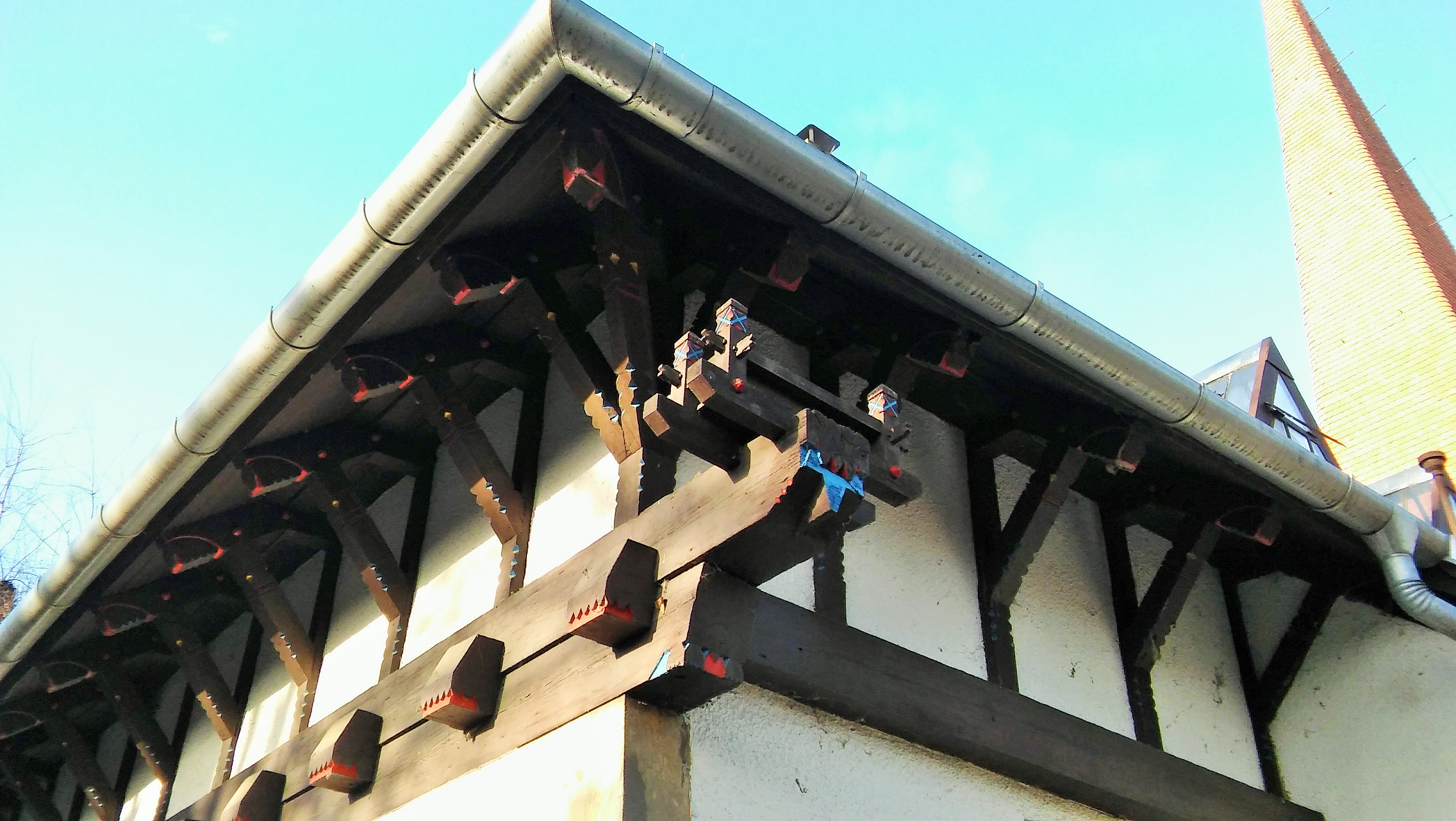
Closeup of the timber frame of the Budapest Zoo Bird House

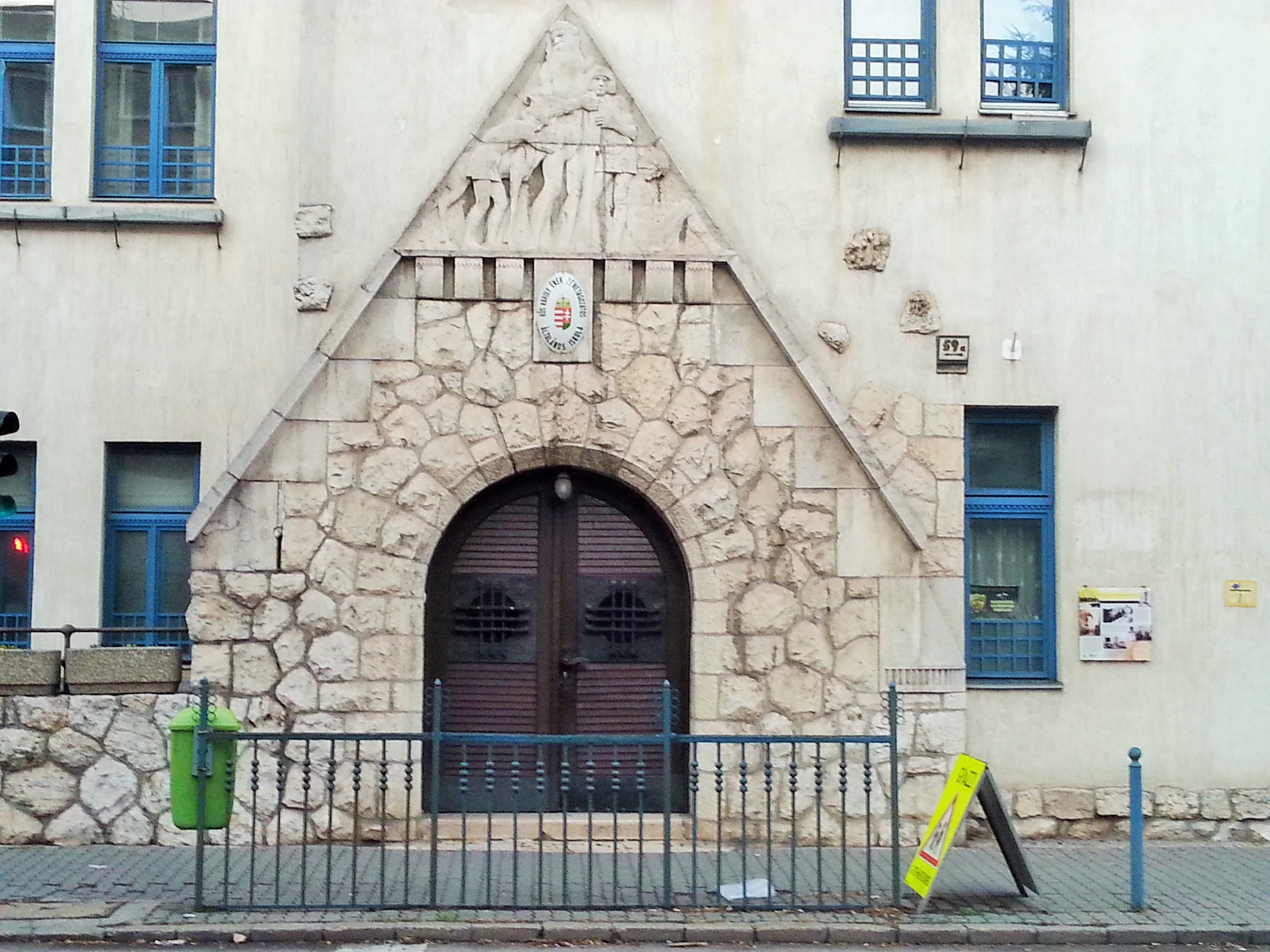
Entrance of the Városmajor Street School

- 1908-1910
  - Reformed Parish Church, Óbuda
  - Roman Catholic Church, Zebegény; with Béla Jánszky
  - Zoo buildings, Budapest; with Dezső Zrumeczky
  - the Varjuvar, Kós' house in Sztana
- 1910-1913
  - Városmajor Street, Budapest; with Dénes Györgyi
  - Wekerle estate, Budapest
  - Székely National Museum, Sfântu Gheorghe (Sepsiszentgyörgy)
  - Church with the Rooster, Cluj
- 1930s and 1940s
  - Kós' house in Miskolc
  - Exhibition Hall, Cluj
  - King Matthias House restoration, Cluj
  - Milk hall, Mera village, Baciu

== Novels ==
- Varjú nemzetség ("The Varjú Kin", 1925)
- A Gálok ("The Gál Family", 1930)
- Országépítő ("The Country Founder", 1934)

== See also ==
- Transylvanianism
