= Tibor Czibere =

Hungarian engineer and politician (1930–2023)

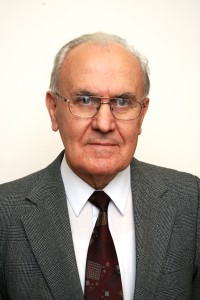

Minister of Education of Hungary
- In office 29 June 1988 – 10 May 1989
- Preceded by: Béla Köpeczi
- Succeeded by: Ferenc Glatz

Personal details
- Born: 16 October 1930 Tapolca, Hungary
- Died: 24 December 2023 (aged 93)
- Party: independent
- Profession: Engineer, politician

Tibor Czibere (16 October 1930 – 24 December 2023) was a Hungarian engineer and politician, who served as Minister of Education between 1988 and 1989. He was a member of the Hungarian Academy of Sciences since 1985. Czibere served as rector of the University of Miskolc between 1978 and 1986. He died on 24 December 2023, at the age of 93.

== Sources ==
- Biography

Political offices
Preceded by Béla Köpeczi	Minister of Education; 1988–1989	Succeeded by Ferenc Glatz
