= Béla Köpeczi =

Hungarian cultural historian and politician (1921–2010)

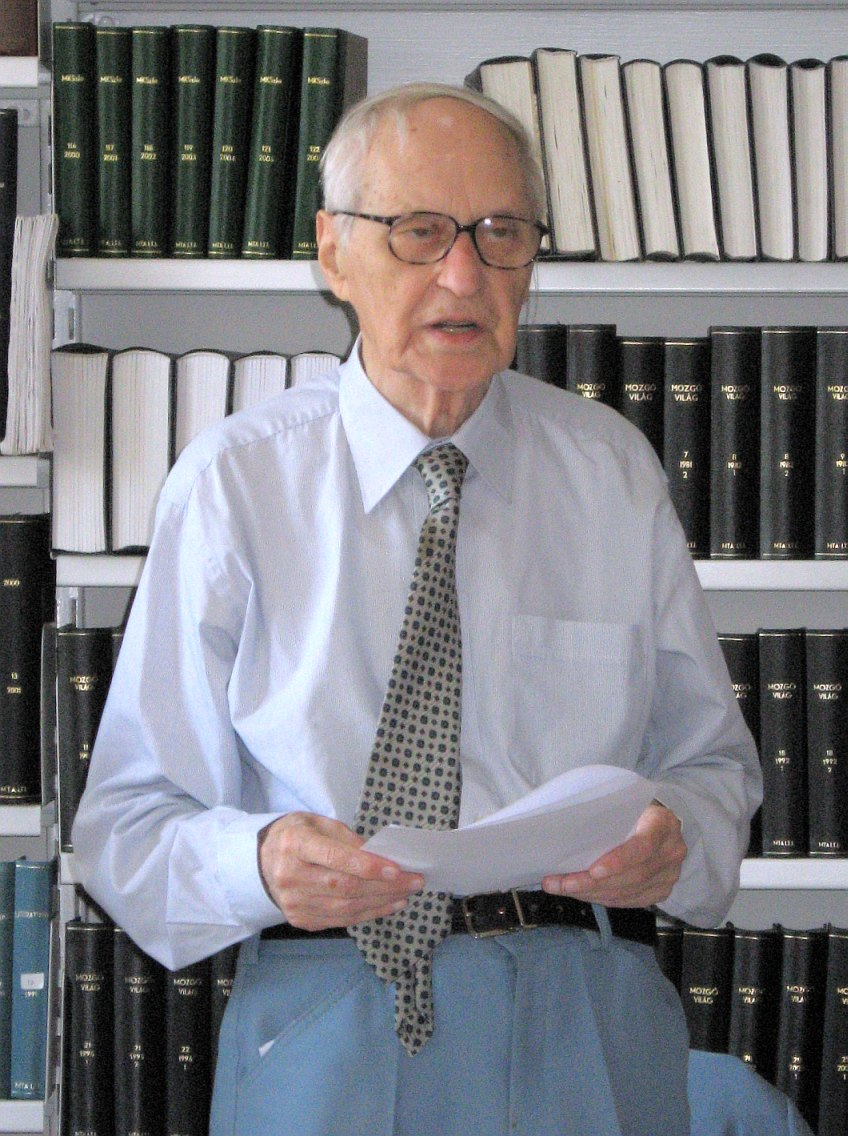

Minister of Education of Hungary
- In office 25 June 1982 – 29 June 1988
- Preceded by: Imre Pozsgay
- Succeeded by: Tibor Czibere

Personal details
- Born: 16 September 1921; Aiud, Kingdom of Romania
- Died: 17 January 2010 (aged 88); Budapest, Hungary
- Political party: MDP, MSZMP
- Profession: literary historian, cultural historian, politician

Béla Köpeczi (16 September 1921 – 17 January 2010) was a Hungarian cultural historian and politician, who served as minister of education between 1982 and 1988. He was the secretary-general of the Hungarian Academy of Sciences from 1972 to 1975.

Political offices
Preceded by Imre Pozsgay	Minister of Education; 1982–1988	Succeeded by Tibor Czibere
