= Iván T. Berend =

Hungarian historian (1930–2026)

- Born: Iván Tibor Berend; 11 December 1930; Budapest, Hungary
- Died: 30 August 2026 (aged 95); Los Angeles, California, U.S.
- Citizenship: Hungarian
- Education: University of Economics and the Eötvös Lóránd University
- Occupations: Historian, economist, university professor, politician
- Children: Nora Berend and Zsuzsa Berend

Iván Tibor Berend (11 December 1930 – 30 August 2026) was a Hungarian historian and teacher who served as President of the Hungarian Academy of Sciences from 1985 until 1990. He was a member of Hungarian Socialist Workers' Party's Central Committee between 1988 and 1989. From 1990, he lived in Los Angeles and taught at UCLA. Berend specialised in the economic and social history of Europe in the 19th and 20th centuries. In 2015, he was elected to the American Academy of Arts and Sciences.

== Early life ==
Iván Tibor Berend was born in Budapest, Hungary on 11 December 1930, during the Great Depression. He came from a lower-middle-class Jewish family that was not highly educated. Berend was raised in the 7th district of Budapest, a strongly Jewish neighbourhood, and lived at 36 Akácfa utca with family and a close community of neighbours.

He started school in 1937, during a period of rising nationalism caused by the re-annexation of some of Hungary's lost territories. Iván Berend was nine years old when the Second World War broke out, and his family began to be directly affected by anti-Jewish laws from June 1944 onwards. During that time, the building they lived in, along with many other houses inhabited by Jewish families, was formally designated as Jewish when a large yellow Star of David was put on the entrance door. These were known as "Jewish houses", causing the separation and isolation of Jewish citizens in their homes and neighbourhoods. On 25 June, a curfew was imposed, which only allowed Iván and his family to leave the building for two hours in the morning. That year, his father was sent to a labour battalion like most adult Jews, and his brother Ervin was killed by Hungarian fascists after having been sent to the Trans-Danubian region.

On 15 October 1944, labour service was extended and included men between 16 and 60 years old. On 31 October, Berend was detained in his building by German soldiers and members of the Hungarian Nazi Arrow Cross militia, including a former friend, and was taken away in a German truck with other Jews. They were taken first to Lepsény, then to the cities of Veszprém, and later to the Komárom Csillagerőd prison, where he was imprisoned during the winter of 1944 and where he turned 14 years old. Iván was then taken to the Dachau concentration camp in Munich, where he was assigned to Block 23. There, he met and lived with other people in the same situation, such as Tibor Varga and György Goldman. On 27 April, he and others from the same block were evacuated toward the Alps by SS guards, but managed to escape and hide in the forest for the following days. After receiving help from American soldiers in the Gebirgsjägerschule in Mittanwald and then recovering in a rehabilitation camp in Feldafing during the summer of 1945, Iván Berend returned and arrived in Budapest on 31 August 1945, where he reunited with his parents.

== Post-war period ==
After the war, Berend encountered social and political tensions in Budapest. He joined a Zionist youth organisation, where he engaged with debates related to Jewish identity, but soon decided to focus on what was happening in Hungary and left the organisation. Berend, like many Holocaust survivors and younger generations, was concerned about the resurgence of anti-communism, which was perceived as leading towards pro-fascist tendencies. After his father joined the Communist Party in 1945, he followed in his footsteps at the age of sixteen. Berend equally developed sympathies for internationalism, which offered a world without discrimination and hate, and for the Soviet Union's central role in the defeat of Nazi resistance.

In the post-war period, besides becoming politically engaged, Berend's family abandoned religious practices and even religious belief as a result of past losses and the idea of a communist world, in which ethnicity and religion would no longer play a role. Berend himself distanced his personal identity from religion and rarely spoke about his wartime experiences during this period. This period of his life is equally characterised by poverty. In the early 1950s, Berend and his family lived under significant financial hardship and risked having to share their apartment with other families due to the housing crisis. This did not happen because of his marriage in 1953, although he continued to live with his parents for several years. The political conditions began to improve when the Communist Party's June 1953 resolution acknowledged previous policy mistakes, which led to the government position being taken by Imre Nagy after Mátyás Rákosi's resignation.

== Education and academic formation ==
Berend first applied and entered the Jewish Gymnasium in Budapest in 1941. He continued his studies at the same gymnasium after the war in 1945 and became active in sports. During the last years of his secondary education, his academic formation was influenced by teachers like his literature teacher Miklós Szabolcsi and his history teacher Zsigmond Pál Pach. In 1946, he entered Hungary's national secondary-school history competition and placed third with the topic of the 1848 Revolution. He placed second in the competition of the following year. Pach's appointment as head of the Economic History Department at the University of Economics also led Berend to choose that university.

He spent four years at two leading universities in Budapest, the University of Economics and the Eötvös Lóránd University, between 1949 and 1953. His higher-education period was heavily marked by Stalinist dictatorship. As a freshman, Berend was recruited by Zsigmond Pál Pach into a research group alongside his schoolmate and friend György Ránki, at the Institute of History of the Hungarian Academy of Sciences. His task was to collect sources related to the nineteenth and twentieth-century Hungarian economic history in the National Archives. In 1955, two years after his B.A. degree, he and György Ránki released their first book on Hungarian industry before World War I. He defended his doctoral dissertation in Economics in 1957 and obtained his PhD in Economics one year later. He became a Doctor of History in 1962 at the Hungarian Academy of Sciences.

== Professional career ==
In 1953, Berend started working as an Assistant Professor at the Department of Economic History at the Budapest University of Economics. During the Hungarian Revolution of 1956, Berend actively participated in anti-Stalinist popular circles, including the Petőfi Circle, and supported student demands for political change and the return of Imre Nagy, his old professor and later colleague, to government. In 1960, he became an Associate Professor and was later a professor between 1964 and 1991. From the early 1960s, the opening of Hungary allowed Berend to travel and engage with Western scholarship, which began with his participation in the XIth International Historical Congress in Stockholm in 1960. He was equally appointed the rector of Karl Marx University of Economics between 1973 and 1979.

Berend later became President of the Hungarian Academy of Sciences from 1985 to 1990. In 1990, he moved to the United States, where he began teaching at the University of California, Los Angeles, and continued his scholarly career, publishing on European economic and social history of central and eastern Europe. Between 1990 and 2015, he served as a professor in the Department of History at UCLA. Between 1993 and 2005, Berend was the Director at the Centre for European and Eurasian Studies at the University of California. He retired at the age of 85 in May 2015.

== Death ==
Berend died in Los Angeles on 30 August 2026, at the age of 95.

== Publications ==
With György Ránki:

- Magyarország gyáripara 1900–1914 (1955)
- Magyarország gyáripara a második világháború előtt és a háború időszakában 1933–1944 (1958)
- Magyarország a fasiszta Németország „életterében” 1933–1939 (1960)
- Közép-Kelet-Európa gazdasági fejlődése a 19–20. században (1966)
- A magyar gazdaság száz éve 1848–1944 (1973)
- Gazdaság és társadalom (1974)
- Gazdasági elmaradottság, kiutak és kudarcok a 19. századi Európában (1979)
- Európa gazdasága 1780–1914 (1987)

Major works:

- Újjáépítés és a nagytőke elleni harc Magyarországon 1945–1949 (1962)
- A szocialista gazdaság fejlődése Magyarországon (1974)
- Napjaink – a történelemben (1980)
- Válságok évtizedek (1982)
- Gazdasági útkeresés (1983)
- A magyar gazdasági reform útja (1988)
- Transition to a Market Economy at The End of the 20th Century (szerk., 1994)
- Central and Eastern Europe 1944–1993: Detour from the Periphery to the Periphery (1996, in Hungarian with the title of Terelőúton, 1999)
- A történelem – ahogy megéltem (1997)
- Decades of Crisis: Central and Eastern Europe Before World War II. (1998)
- History Derailed: Central and Eastern Europe in the Long 19th Century (2003, in Hungarian with the title of Kisiklott történelem)
- An Economic History of 20th Century Europe (2006, in Hungarian with the title of Európa gazdasága a 20. században, 2008)
- From the Soviet Bloc to the European Union: The Economic and Social Transformation of Central and Eastern Europe Since 1973 (2009)
- History in My Life: A Memoir in Three Eras (2009)
- Europe in Crisis – Bolt from the blue? (2013)
- A Century of Populist Demagogues: Eighteen European Portraits, 1918–2018. Budapest; New York: Central European University Press. 2020. ISBN 978-9633863343. OCLC 1121286642.

== Bibliography ==
BEREND, Iván T, History in My Life: A Memoir of Three Eras, Budapest and New York: Central European University Press, 2009

CURRICULUM VITAE de Ivan T. Berend, in: UCLA, URL: https://history.ucla.edu/person/ivan-berend/ (last accessed: 24 December 2025)

Ivan Berend, in: Academia Europaea, URL: https://www.ae-info.org/ae/Member/Berend_Ivan/ (last Retrieved 9 December 2025) Berend, Ivan (1930-), URL: https://www.persee.fr/authority/30692 (last accessed: 24 December 2025)

SHARPE, Maggie, Professor who taught history — and lived it — retires (12.05.2015), in: UCLA Newsroom, URL: https://newsroom.ucla.edu/dept/faculty/professor-who-taught-history-and-lived-it-retires (last accessed: 24 December 2025)

Curriculum Vitar Ivan T. Berend, in: UCLA History, URL: https://history.ucla.edu/wp-content/uploads/2021/11/berendcv_2010.pdf (last accessed: 24 December 2025)

Cultural offices
Preceded by János Szentágothai	President of the Hungarian Academy of Sciences; 1985–1990	Succeeded by Domokos Kosáry
