= István Szőnyi =

Hungarian painter

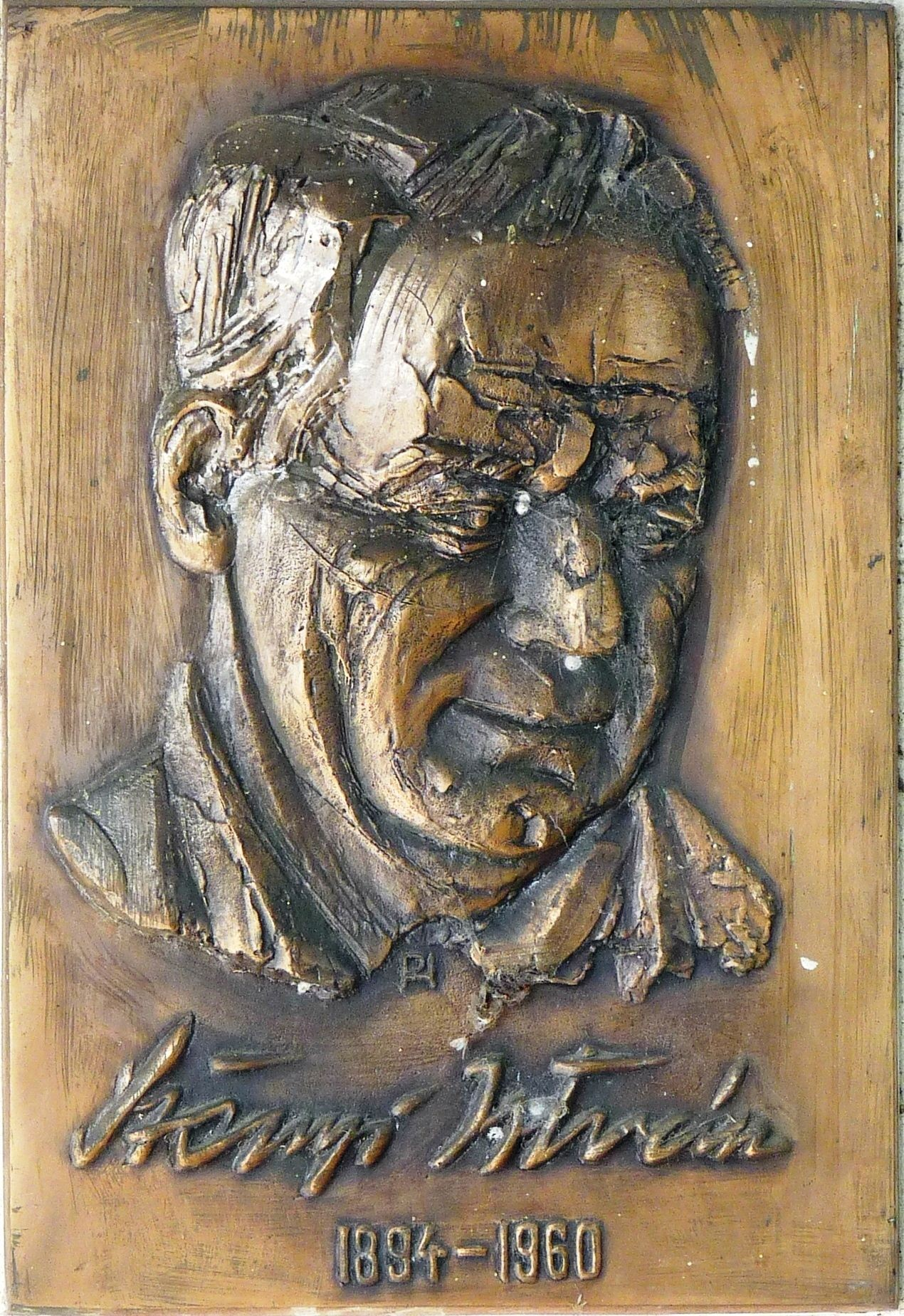
Plaque of Katalin Pálffy

István Szőnyi (1894–1960) was a Hungarian painter and printmaker noted for works such as The Bend of the Danube and Zebegény. He and his family rescued Jews during the Holocaust. Hence they were declared Righteous Among the Nations on October 2, 1984. István Szőnyi was one of the most gifted members of the Nagybánya group.

Szőnyi started his art studies at the independent school of the Hungarian Academy of Fine Arts from 1911, and then enrolled in the art-teachers training school for 1913 and 1914. Also in 1914, he became the pupil of his first master Károly Ferenczy in both the independent school of Nagybánya and in the Hungarian Academy of Fine Arts. In the summer of 1914, Ferenczy brought his students – including Szőnyi – to the Artists’ Colony of Nagybánya.

While on leave from military duty, Szőnyi also spent the summers of 1917 and 1918 at Nagybánya.

Following discharge from the military, in 1918 he returned to the Academy. This time he studied as István Réti’s pupil. In 1921, Ernst Museum featured Szőnyi in his first one-man show.

Szőnyi expanded his exposure to the arts during trips around Europe. Visiting Vienna and Berlin acquainted him with the great classical masters. However Szőnyi's involvement in political advocacy led to his expulsion from the Academy in 1920.

As a significant member of the "etching generation", he contributed to the development of Hungarian graphic art at the beginning of the 1920s.

Szőnyi moved to Zebegény in 1924, participated in the first exhibition of the newly formed KUT, and taught at the Independent School of the City Centre. In 1928 he received the state grant to Rome, when it had just been established.

In 1937 Szőnyi was appointed to a professor of the Academy of Fine Arts, and taught for more than two decades. Despite being the leading professor of the mural department, he only received a few monumental commissions.

During the 1930s, Szőnyi was active in artistic life as a member of the Gresham circle. His accomplishments included a number of monumental commissions, and publishing a treatise on drawing and painting techniques.

During Szőnyi's last years he was often ill. He spent almost all his time in Zebegény.

The Szőnyi István Memorial Museum was established in Zebegény and opened in 1967. The museum features both the flat and studio where the artist worked. The goal is "to preserve and show as much as possible of both Szőnyi's works and the milieu where these works were created."
