= Chemical Research Center of the Hungarian Academy of Sciences =

Hungarian non-profit research institute

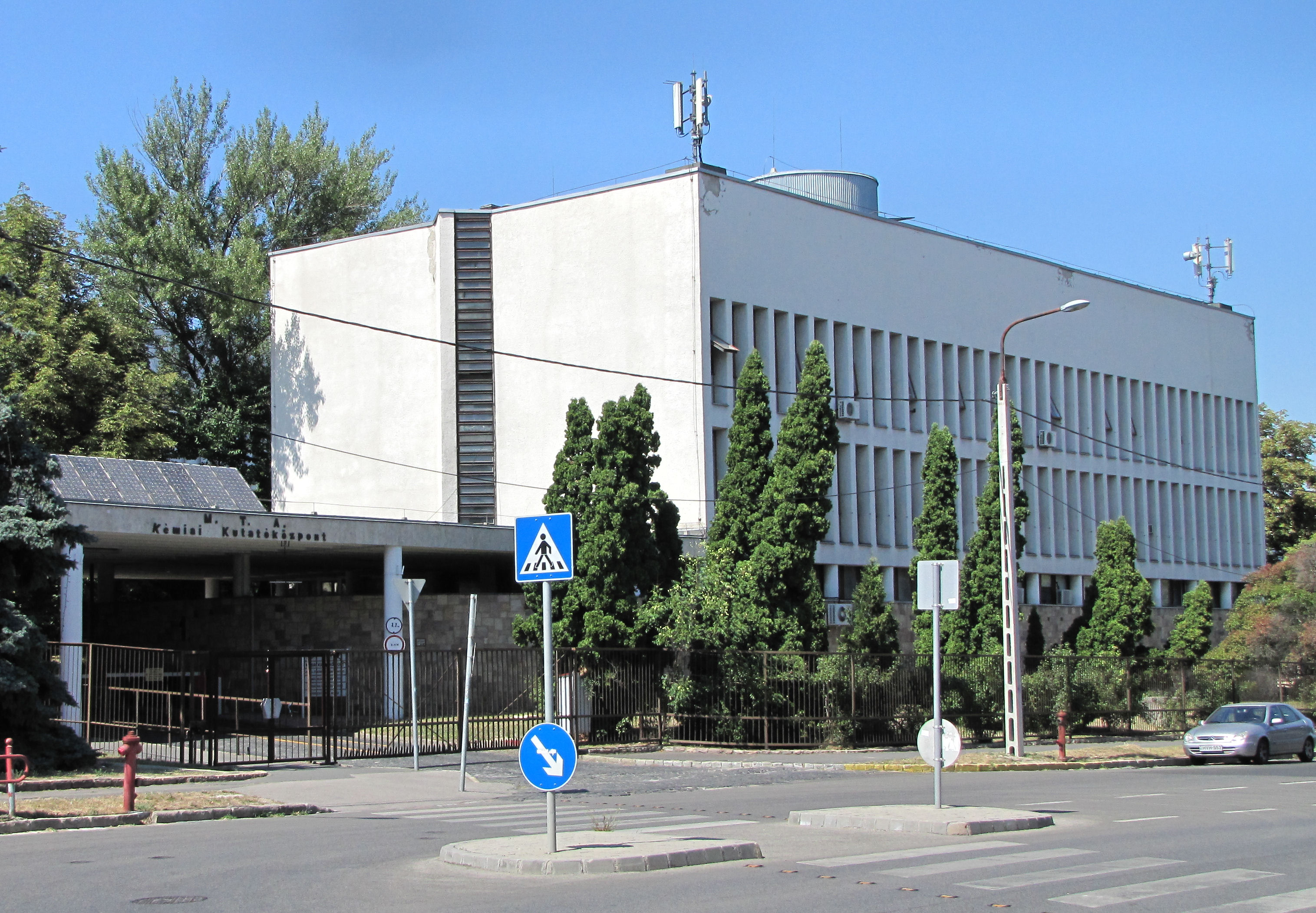
Institute of Chemical Research of the Hungarian Academy of Sciences, Budapest.

The Chemical Research Center of the Hungarian Academy of Sciences (in short: CRC-HAS, Hungarian language: Magyar Tudományos Akadémia Kémiai Kutatóközpont, MTA KK) is a non-profit research institute seated in Budapest, Hungary.

The Chemical Research Center of the Hungarian Academy of Sciences belongs to the research network of the Hungarian Academy of Sciences as its largest research centre. It is an independent legal body governed by public law.

== History of the institute ==
The predecessor of the Chemical Research Center, the Central Research Institute of Chemistry of the Hungarian Academy of Sciences started its activity under guidance of the founding director, prof. Géza Schay, in 1952.

The Chemical Research Center was established by the Hungarian Academy of Sciences in 1997 in order to concentrate chemical research activities within the academy into a single organization.

Following a reorganization process aimed at modernizing the thematic and institutional structure of researches, five research institutes have been formed within the Center in 2004. In a few years The Institute of Isotopes has been detached from the Research Centre.

The deed of foundation of the Research Center was renewed in 2008.

== Main activities ==
Research teams of the Chemical Research Center have carried out pioneering work in several fields of science in Hungary. These topics include the preparation of organic compounds labeled with radioactive isotopes and their application in the interpretation of reaction mechanisms; theoretical studies in gas chromatography, investigation of the isomerization and cracking reactions of hydrocarbons, study of liquid phase catalytic reactions; studies of molecular and crystal structure: application of infrared, Raman and NMR spectroscopy, mass spectrometry, X-ray diffraction; investigation of liquid phase polymerization processes and degradation of polymers, and research in bioorganic chemistry.

Mission of the Research Center is to conduct highly innovative, interdisciplinary research in the fields of chemistry and related areas, focusing on chemical structure and reactivity relationships.

The main task of the center is the advancement of fundamental knowledge on

- chemistry of biosciences, with emphasis on drug design based on revealing the role of biomolecules in physiological processes, and synthesis of biomaterials,
- chemistry of nanosciences, aiming at the study of new catalysts, surface coatings, interfacial phenomena, nanoparticles, microporous and mesoporous materials, new polymeric materials, ceramics, and composites,
- chemistry of the environment, study of the processes of green chemistry.

Activity of the Research Center covers applied researches and development in various fields of chemistry, and chemical and pharmaceutical industry in order to introduce scientific results into the practice. It undertakes contract research works and analytical measurements for industrial partners and governmental laboratories.

The Center exploits the multidisciplinary character of the researches conducted and brings together scientists with different backgrounds.

Beyond research, the institute is

- involved in higher education (both at gradual and post-gradual levels),
- provides expertise and services to national authorities and other customers
- performs targeted R&D projects.etc.

== Structure ==
- Institute of Biomolecular Chemistry,
- Institute of Nanochemistry and Catalysis,
- Institute of Material and Environmental Chemistry,
- Institute of Structural Chemistry.
