= Akadémia utca =

Street in Budapest, Hungary

Coordinates: 47.5031°N 19.0464°E

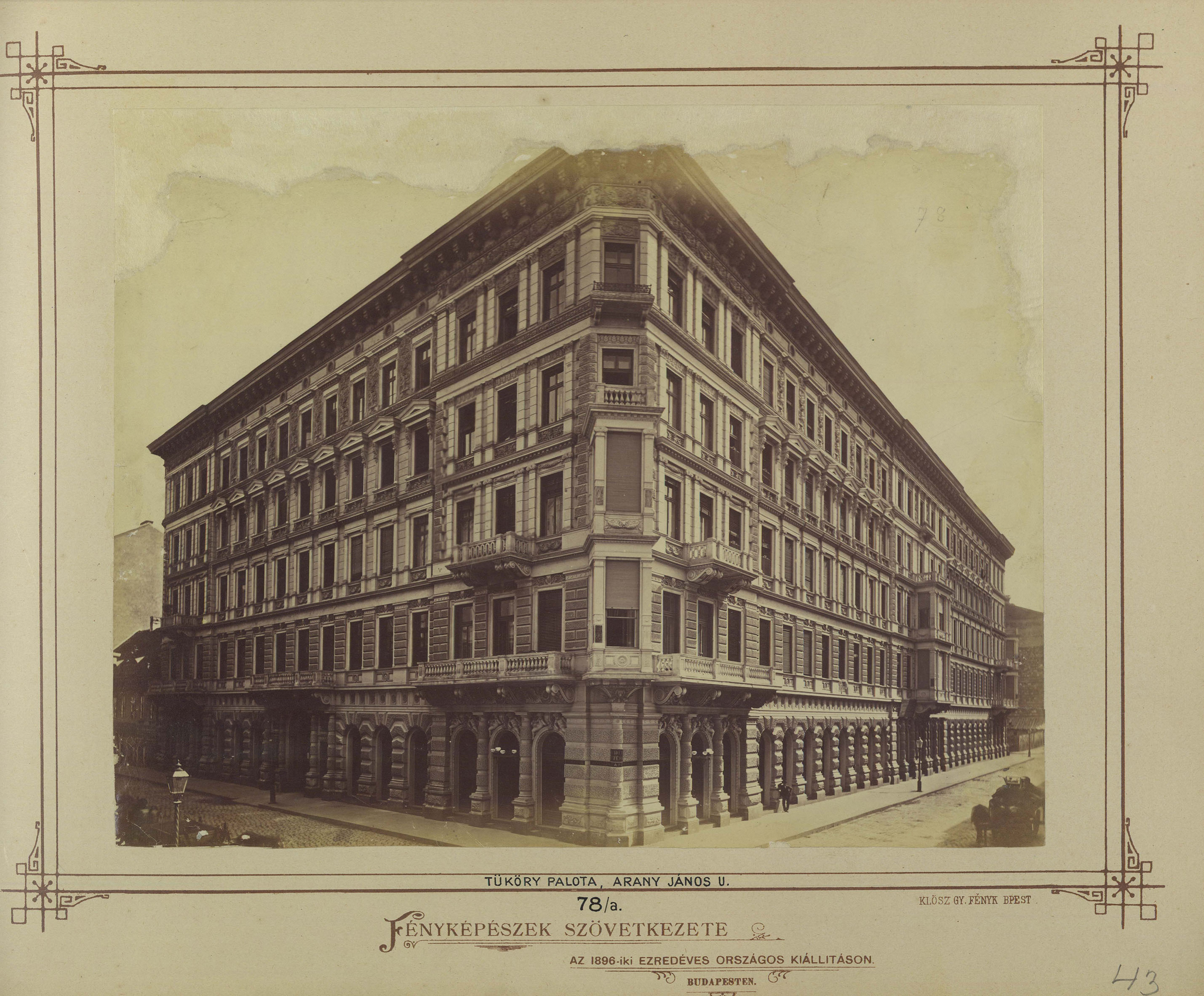
Hungary, Budapest V.

Akadémia utca (Hungarian pronunciation: [ˈɒkɒdeːmijɒ ˈut͡sːɒ], lit. 'academy street') is between Roosvelt tér and Kossuth Lajos tér in Belváros–Lipótváros Budapest, Hungary.

Stone wall on the quay was ready in 1860. A new line of building sides was created between Lánchídfő and Zoltán utca. It was built during a short period. It had been called Újpesti út before the headquarters of the Hungarian Academy of Sciences was opened. Since 1865 the road has been called Akadémia utca.

== Buildings and structures ==
- House of Captain Sándor Varga. It is a four-floor classicist corner house built in 1835 by Mátyás Zitterbach. Main facade is portioned by Corinthian piers. There is a grilled balcony on the central risalit. Sándor Ikes owned this house from 1838 until 1845. Then Károly Emmerling asked Ferenc Kasselik to redesign to building for a new hotel, called István főherceg (Stephen archduke). It was the headquarters of the Justice, the Industry and Trade and the Agriculture Departments. In the same year—in November—Józef Bem. Soldiers of Henrich Hentzi damaged the building, but it was redesigned by Ferenc Kasselik. Rezső Hikisch added two new floors. During the World War II the building again damaged. It was restored by Elemér Nagy in 1958.
- Tänzer House (Tänzer-ház). Left from the classicist Upper-Danube line, the two-story house has a risalit at the centre and a balcony on the front side. There is a lesene which connects the two floors. There is a tympanum above the central risalit, and a classicist fountain in the yard. The house was built in 1836 by József Hild.
