= Zebegény =

- Town
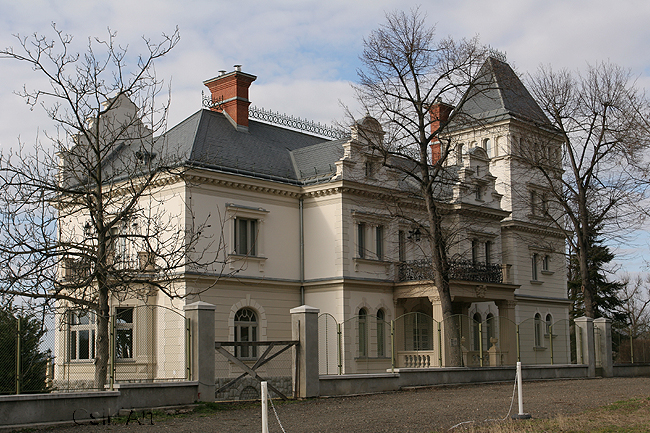
- Palace of Zebegény

- Flag Seal

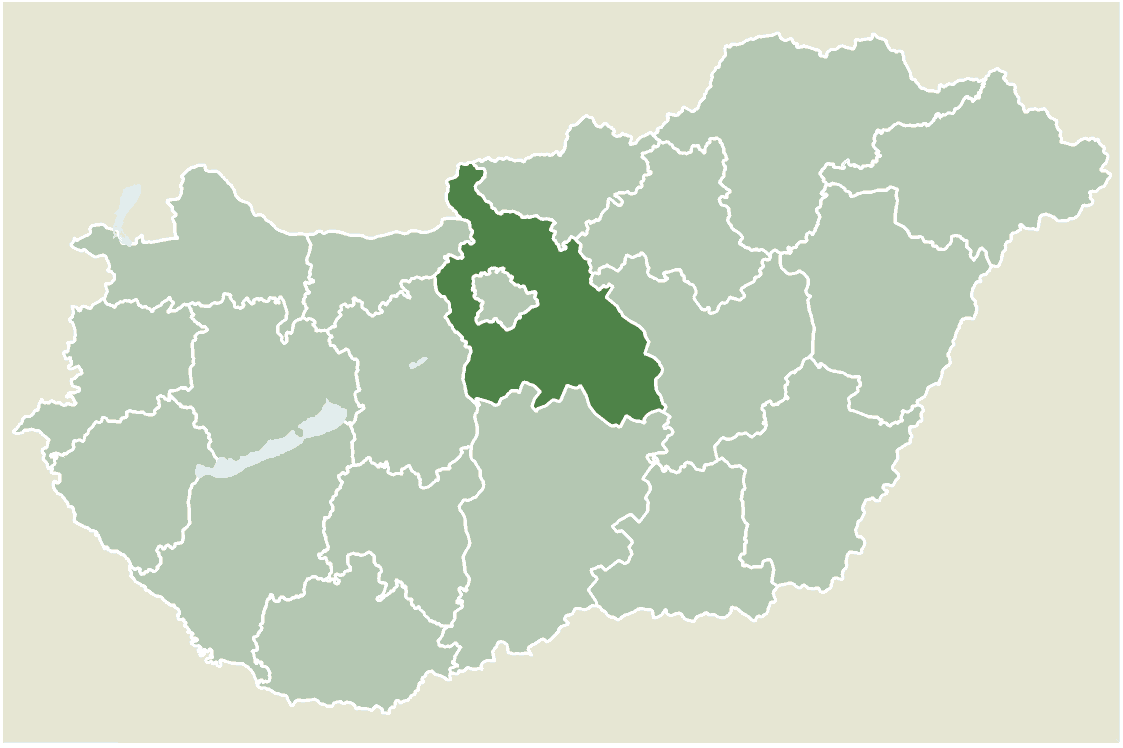
- Location of Pest county in Hungary

- Location of Zebegény
- Coordinates: 47.79757°N 18.90996°E
- Country: Hungary
- County: Pest

Population (2007)
  - Total: 1,204
  - Density: 124.68/km^{2} (322.9/sq mi)
- Time zone: UTC+1 (CET)
  - Summer (DST): UTC+2 (CEST)
- Postal code: 2627
- Area code: 27
- Website: Municipality of Zebegény

Zebegény is a village in Pest county, Hungary. It is located 60 km north of Budapest in the Danube Bend, next to the Duna-Ipoly National Park.

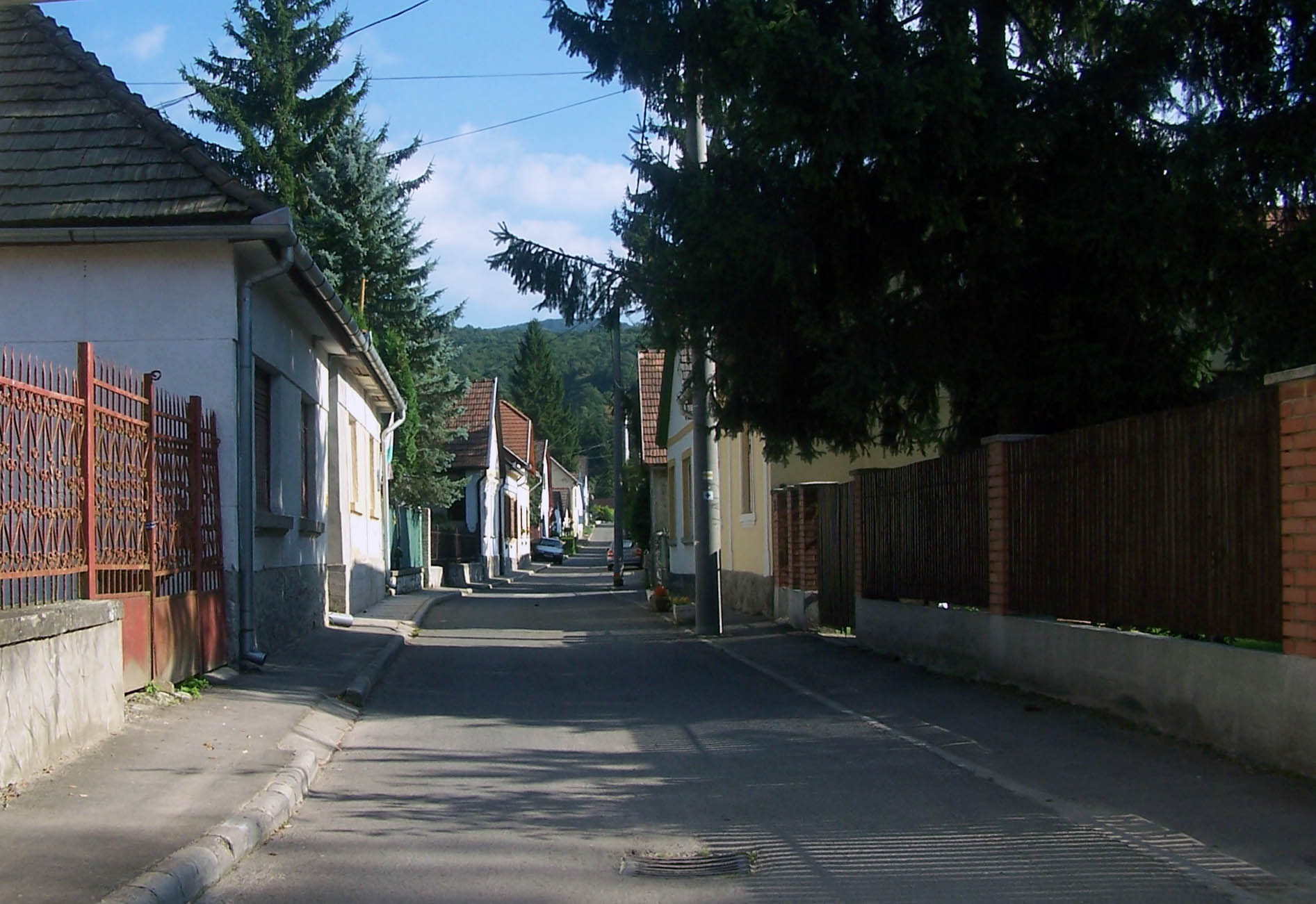
The Szőnyi István street in the centre of the town

== History ==
The town has a rich history. By 1251 a Benedictine monastery had been built in the valley of the Mill Creek. Records from the 8th century note the existence of the village. The first record of the village name dates from a letter of 1295, when it was called Zebeguen.

By 1251 a Benedictine monastery had been built in the valley of the Mill Creek. During the time of the Árpád dynasty, a Benedictine monastery in the Pécs-Baranya diocese was called Szöbegény. According to the archaeologists, the Benedictines moved from Szöbegény to here and recorded the place as Zebegény. A document dated 26 September 1295 calls the Benedictine monastery the "Monasterium de Zebeguennak" (Monastery of Zebegény). In the records of the monastery of Saint Martin at Pannonhalma, Zebegény is noted as officially founded in the Esztergom archdiocese.

In the late medieval ages, during the Turkish invasion, the village was almost destroyed. Zebegény and the area repelled the Turkish invasion around 1685. Later the population was reduced by plague.

During the 18th century, the Crown recruited German farmers to populate the areas decimated by the Ottomans and restore farming along the Danube. The Germans were allowed to keep their language and religion, and became part of the group known as Danouswabians. Numerous German, Hungarian and Slavic migrants settled in the village. Records from the 19th century mention Zebegény as a German-Hungarian-Slavic village.

Since the Hungarian economic transition period in the late twentieth century, the village has its own municipality. It also has an elementary school, kindergarten and a library.

Since the early 1990s, Zebegény has become a popular destination among the people of Budapest. Due to its beaches, mountains, and forests, the village has been nicknamed "The marble of the Danube Bend".

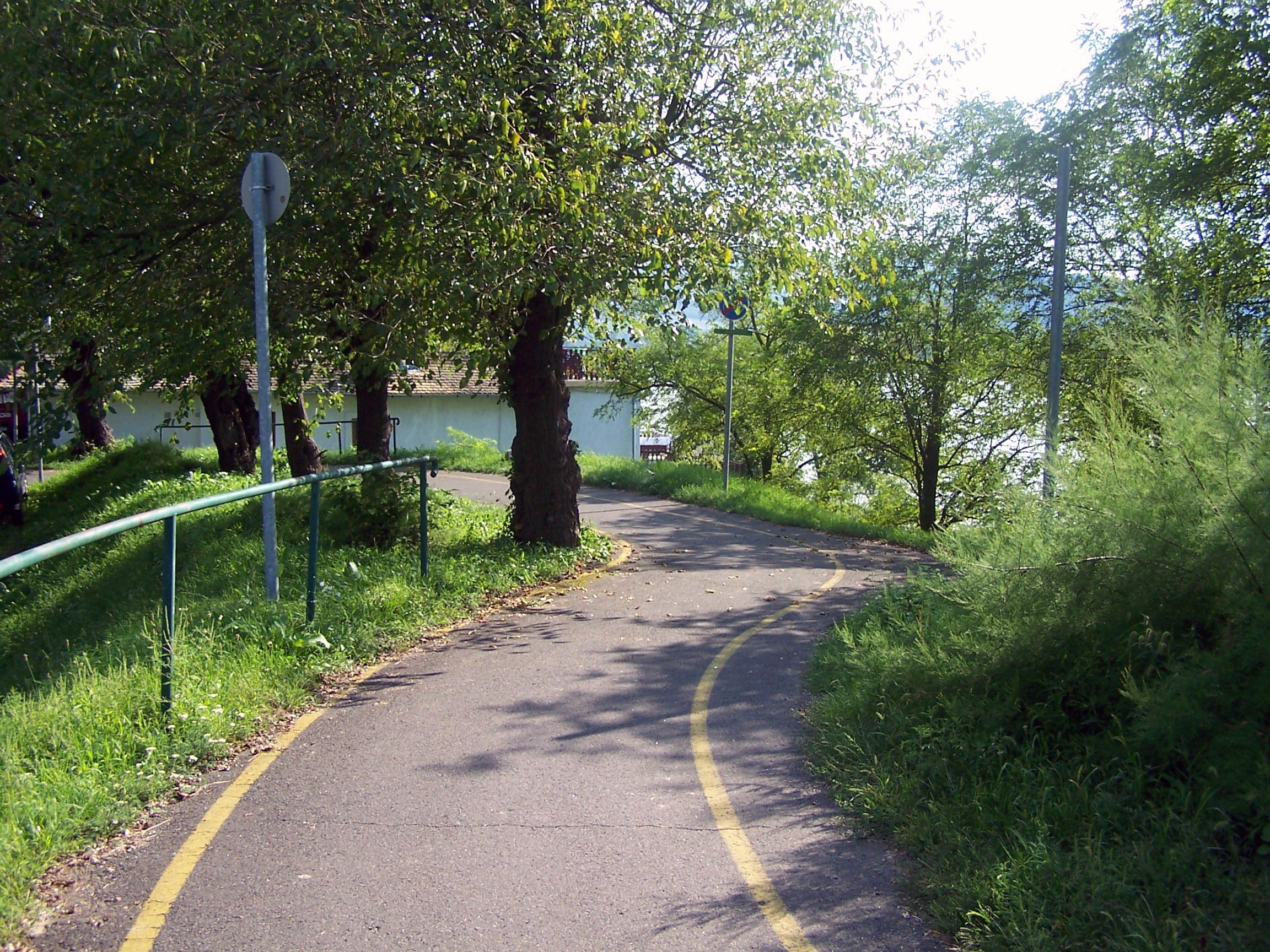
The cycling route

== Culture ==
The village culture includes galleries, festivals, museums, a ski resort, and sport facilities. It is the location of The Museum of István Szőnyi and the Sailing Museum of Vincze Farkas. The village had held the summer Open University of Arts festival since 1968. The village has a Roman Catholic church in the main square that was renovated in 2010.

== Landscape ==
Zebegény lies at the border of the Danube, under the Börzsöny hills. The village is located right next to the Duna-Ipoly National Park. Mill Creek crosses the village and flows into the Danube. From the beach, the Pilis hills are visible. There are three caves above the village of Zebegény that were inhabited by monks in the Middle Ages.

== Landmarks ==
- Dőry-Castle: Located at the shore of the Danube, the castle anchors the village.
- Valley Bride: The seven-hole railway bridge was built in 1850, and is the second-largest rail bridge in Hungary. The Zebegény train station was built that year, in the style of the Austria-Hungary Monarchy.
- Roman Catholic Church: The notable church, located in the main square, was renovated in 2010.
- Trianon Memorial: it marks the territorial losses forced on Hungary under the Treaty of Trianon after World War I.
- Millennium Park: Located next to the train station

== Transport ==
Zebegény is easily acessible by MÁV train, on the Budapest-Bratislava train route. The train takes around 55 minutes from Budapest, starts daily in every hour from Budapest Nyugati train terminal.

Visitors can access the community by car (M2 motorway and 12 main road) from Budapest (around an hour drive). Bicycles are also an option, as a cycling route crosses through the town.

== Notable natives and residents ==
- *Róbert Berény, a Hungarian painter and one of Budapest modernists known as The Eight (Nyolcak), lived and worked here for several years after World War I.
- István Szőnyi (1894 – 1960), painter
- Ferenc Glatz, former president of the Hungarian Academy of Sciences

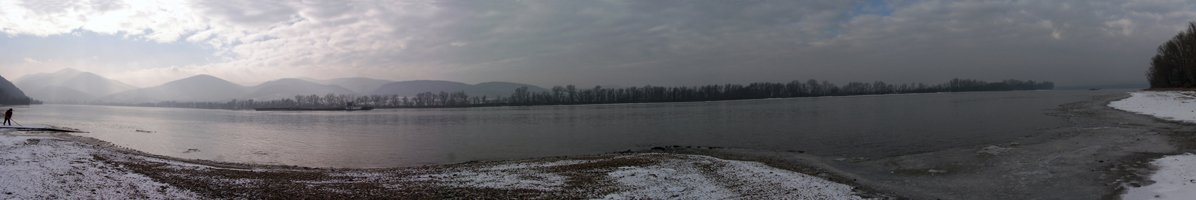
The quiet beach during winter

== Picture gallery ==
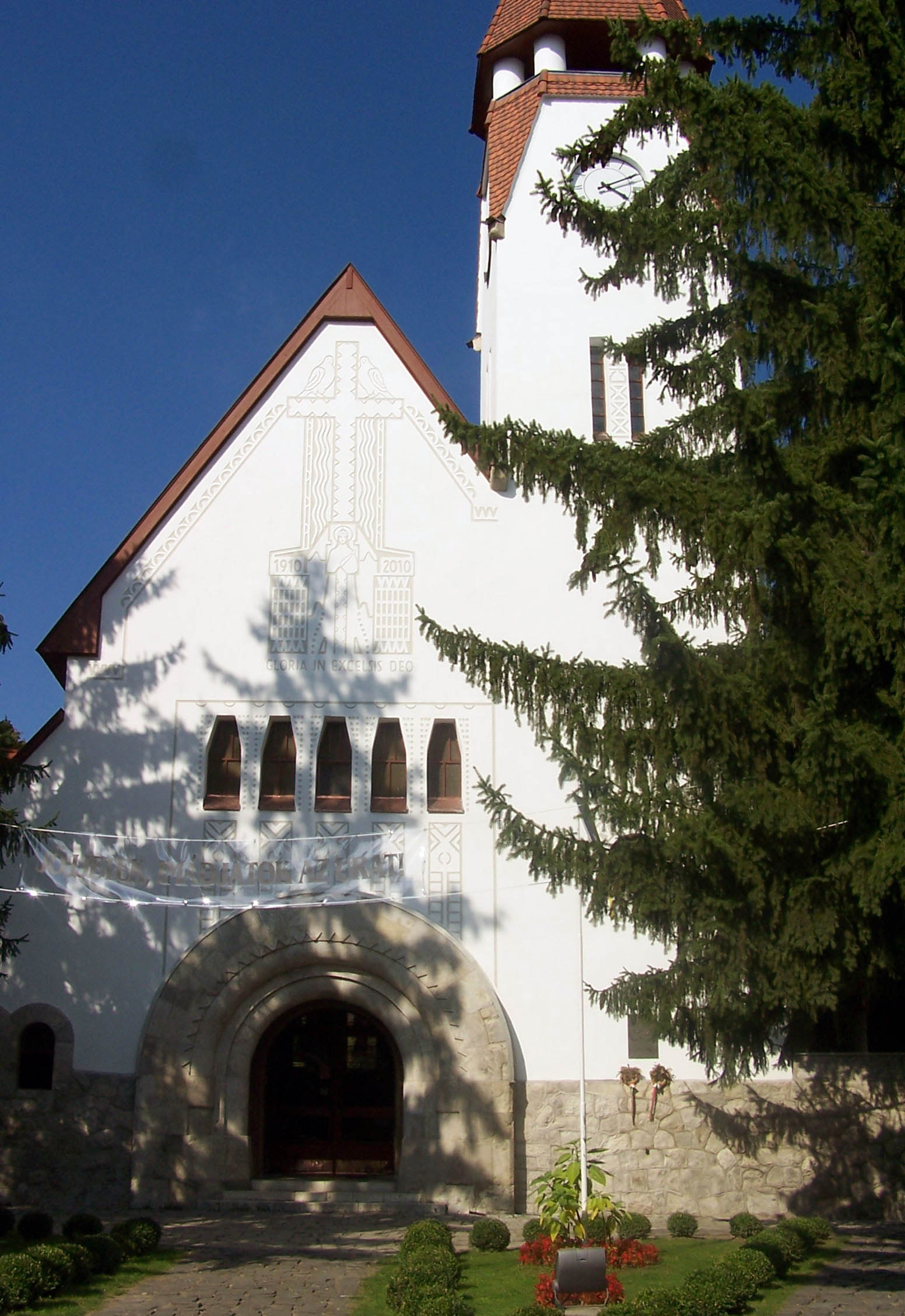
The Roman Catholic Church of Zebegény

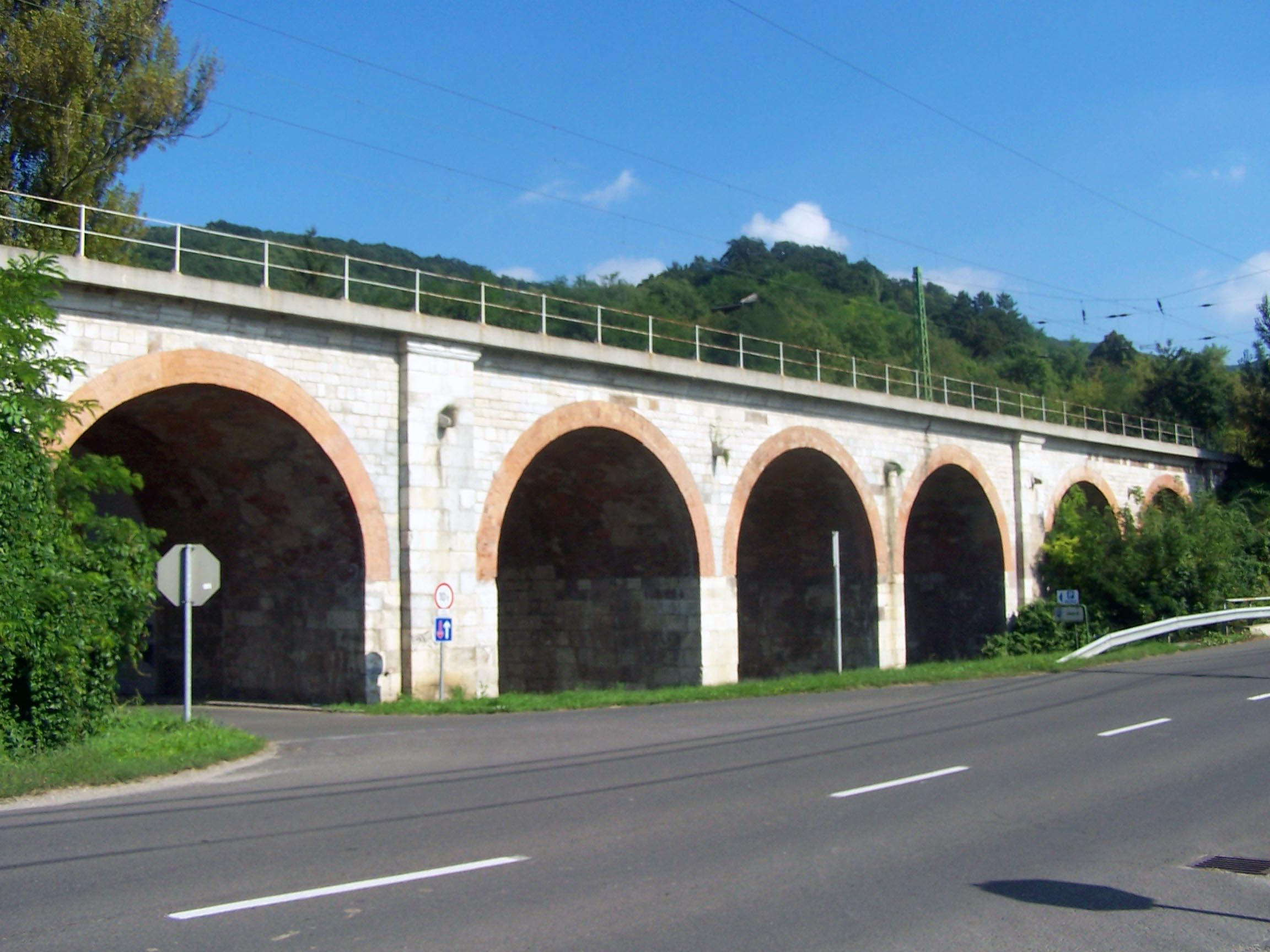
The Valley Bridge

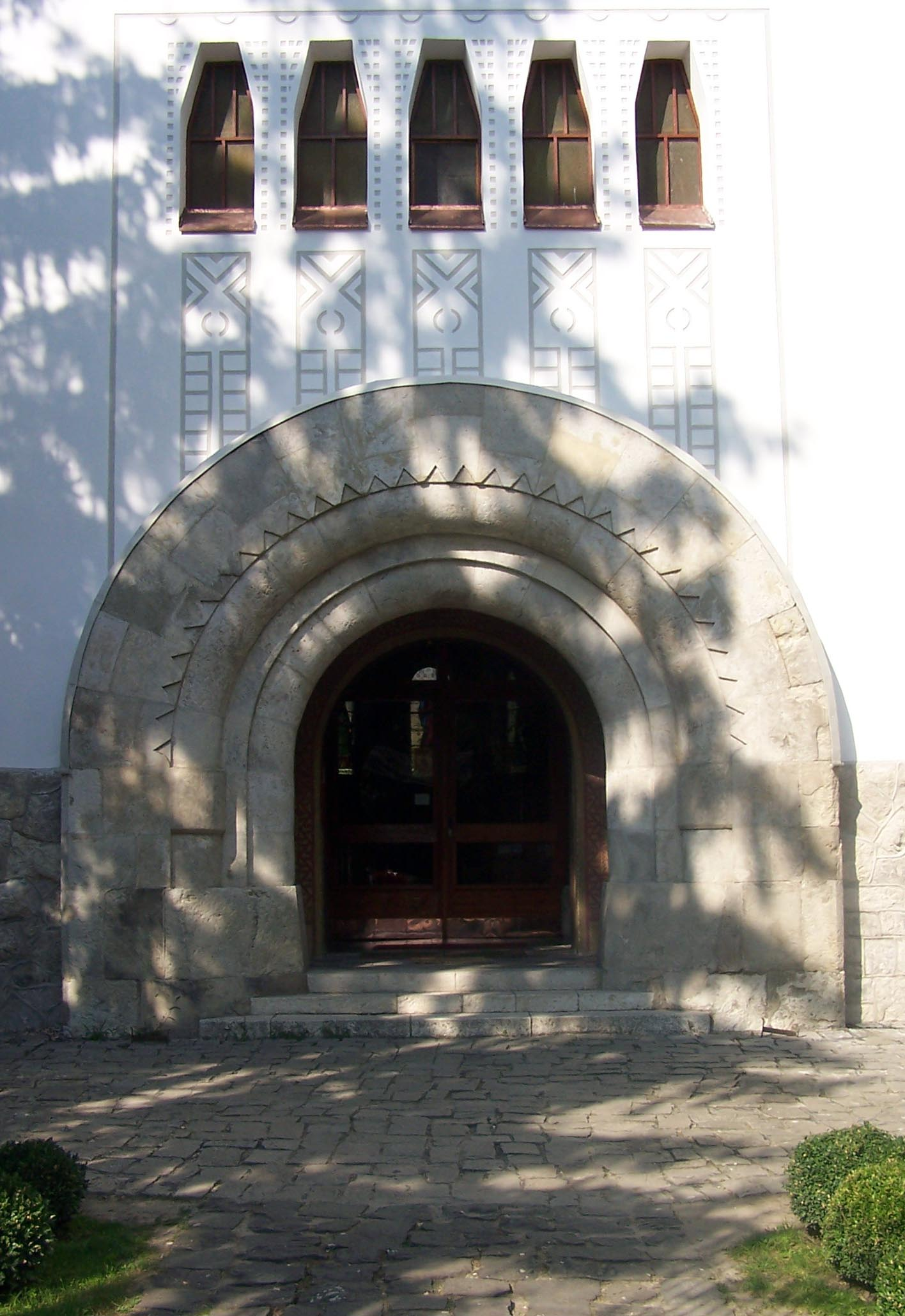
Roman Catholic Church of Zebegény, Entrance

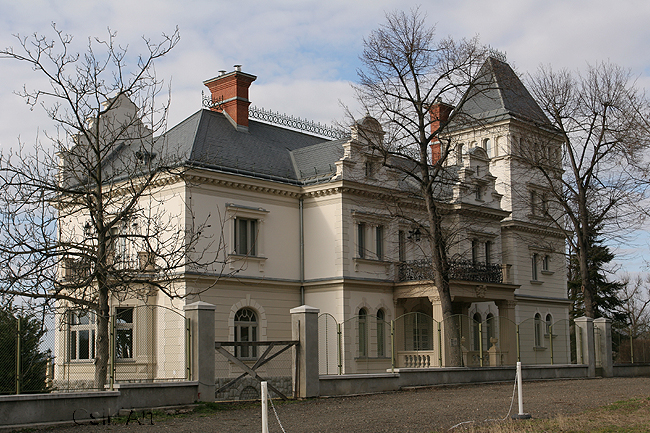
Dőry Castle

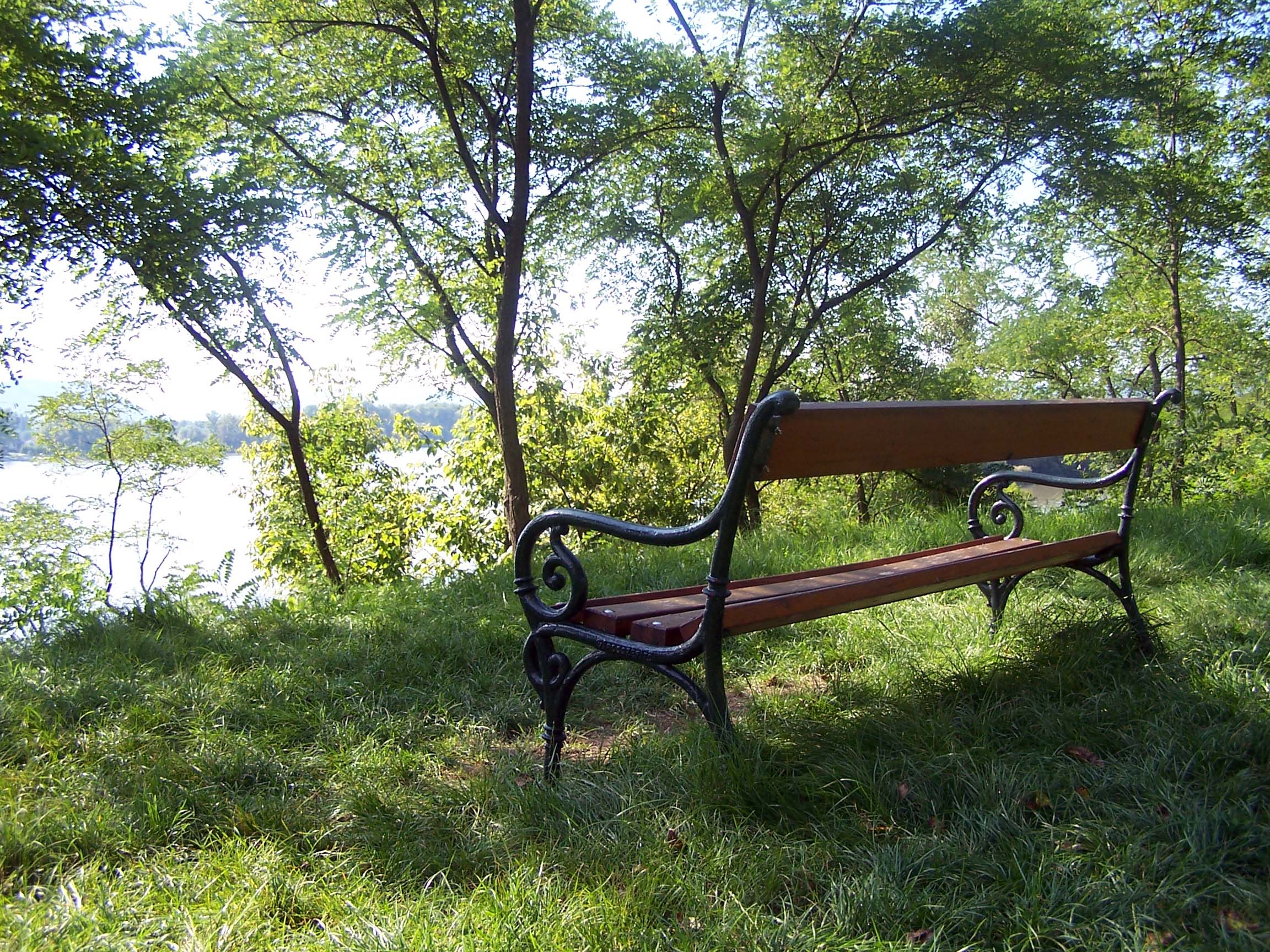
Danube beach from birdspot

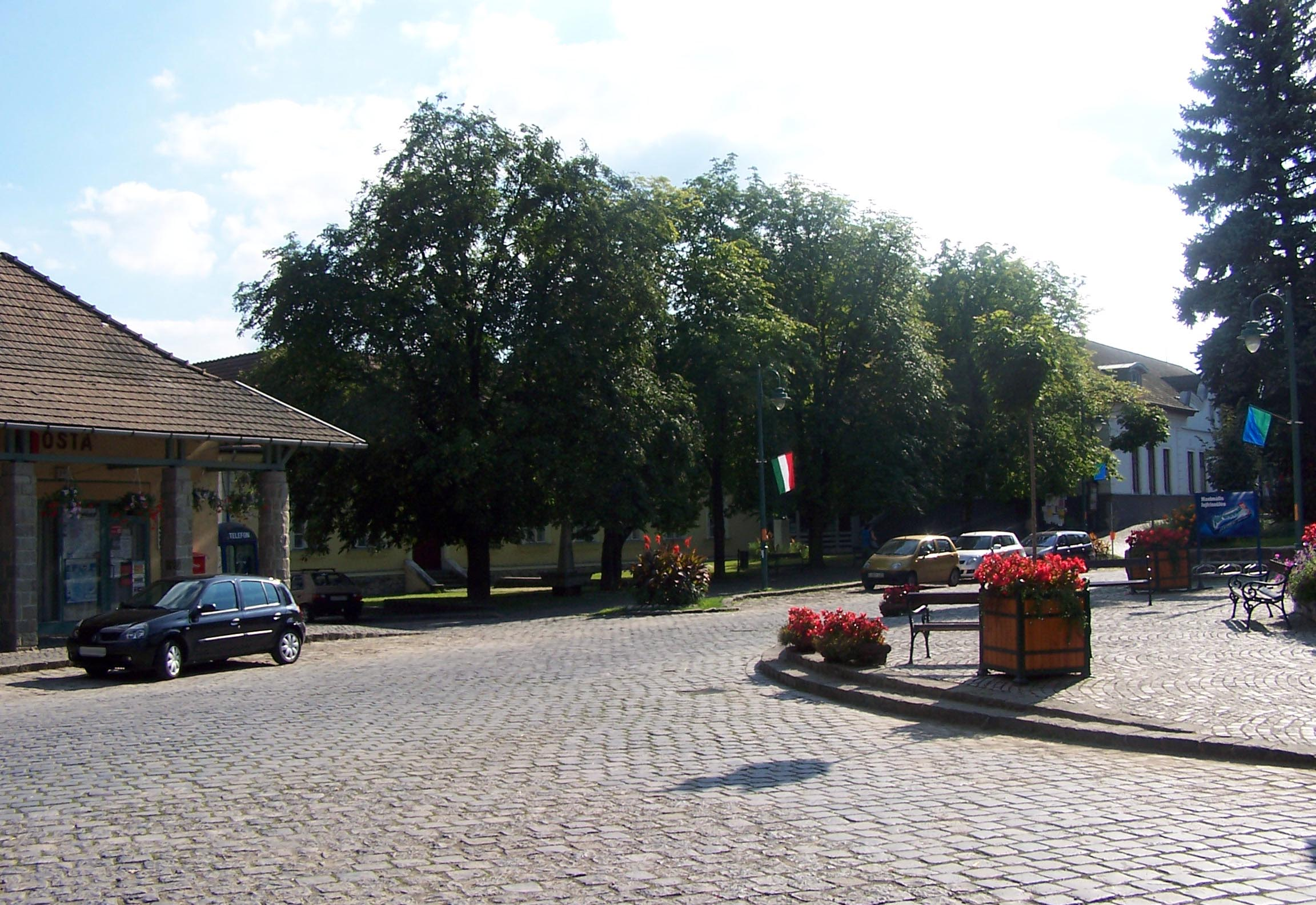
Main Square
