= HUN-REN Wigner Research Centre for Physics =

Hungarian research institute for physics

- Other name: Wigner RCP
- Established: January 1, 2012.
- Head: Dr. Péter Lévai
- Members: 374 (2024)
- Formerly called: 2012–2019 MTA Wigner Research Centre for Physics 2019–2023 Wigner Research Centre for Physics
- Location: Budapest

The HUN-REN Wigner Research Centre for Physics is the largest Hungarian research institute studying physics. Formerly a research institute of the Hungarian Academy of Sciences, it became a member of the Eötvös Loránd Research Network and after the ELKH's reorganisation it became part of the HUN-REN Hungarian Research Network. The Wigner Research Centre was established in 2012 by the merger of the MTA KFKI Institute for Particle and Nuclear Physics and the MTA Institute for Solid State Physics and Optics, and takes the name of the Nobel Prize winning physicist Eugene Wigner. The research centre has two institutes, the Wigner Institute for Particle and Nuclear Physics and the Wigner Institute for Solid State Physics and Optics.

== History ==
The predecessor of the research centre was the Central Research Institute of Physics of the Hungarian Academy of Sciences, founded in 1950. Originally established with two departments, the institute was soon expanded by several departments under the leadership of researchers such as Károly Simonyi and Lajos Jánossy. According to the preparatory committee, its aim was "to raise Hungarian physics research from its present state, which is far behind that of other disciplines, and to enable productive scientific research in all fields of physics which are of primary importance for the development and application of science". From the very beginning, KFKI has been the home to a wide variety of research, and Wigner FK is no different. The direct or indirect exploitation of results has always been a feature. Physics was not the only field at the institute, but also various technical and even life sciences. After the change of regime, the KFKI was dissolved in 1992. and its scientific institutes were given full autonomy within the MTA.

Subsequently, the MTA Wigner Research Centre for Physics was established on January 1, 2012, by the merger of the former MTA KFKI Institute for Particle and Nuclear Physics and the former MTA Institute for Solid State Physics and Optics. Since 2013, the Wigner Data Centre has been part of the Research Centre. From September 1, 2019, the Wigner RCP has been under the management of the Eötvös Loránd Research Network, and continues to operate as an MTA Institute of excellence, today one of the largest research institutes for physics at the HUN-REN. The main research areas are: quantum technology, experimental and theoretical particle physics, nuclear physics, general relativity and gravity, fusion plasma physics, space physics, nuclear materials science, experimental and theoretical solid-state physics, statistical physics, atomic physics, optics and materials science. Wigner RCP is also part of many international collaborations, experiments and projects, such as ALICE experiment, CMS, Na61 or EuPRAXIA

Researchers working in Wigner RCP or in its predecessors: Géza Györgyi, Lajos Jánossy, István Kovács, Vlagyimir Naumovics Gribov, Károly Simonyi, Dezső Kiss, Zoltán Perjés, József Zimányi, Péter Szépfalusy, György Vesztergombi, Lénárd Pál, Győző Farkas, Károly Szegő, László Gránásy, Gyula Bencze.

== Organizational structure ==
=== Institute for Particle and Nuclear Physics ===
The Institute of Particle and Nuclear Physics conducts successful experimental and theoretical exploratory research in the fields of particle physics, nuclear physics, gravitational research, space physics, nuclear solid-state physics and materials science, as well as computational sciences.

=== Institute of Solid State Physics and Optics ===
The Institute of Solid State Physics and Optics is engaged in research and development of atomic-level material structure, quantum physics, quantum optics, statistical physics and laser applications. The main profile of its research groups are experimental research in local laboratories and performing computationally intensive numerical simulations.

=== Wigner Data Centre ===
The Wigner Data Centre is a server infrastructure. Since 2013, the Wigner Data Centre has housed CERN's remote Tier-0 infrastructure, thus playing a key role in processing the data from the Large Hadron Collider (LHC). Following the completion of the CERN project, the reconstruction of hardware elements and redesign of software components led to the establishment of WSCLAB (Wigner Scientific Computing Laboratory), which houses the GPULAB servers, the Virgo research project, the Tier-2 cluster operated for CERN's ALICE and CMS detectors, and the infrastructure of the Wigner ALICE Analysis Facility. The Wigner Data Center now participate in the development and operation of the HUN-REN Cloud Service, as well as in the HUN-REN Data Repository Project on behalf of the HUN-REN Wigner RCP.

=== Prizes donated by Wigner RCP ===
Among the prizes donated by Wigner RCP are the Zimányi Medal (RMI) and the Gribov Medal (RMI)
