= Bertalan Andrásfalvy =

Hungarian ethnographer and politician

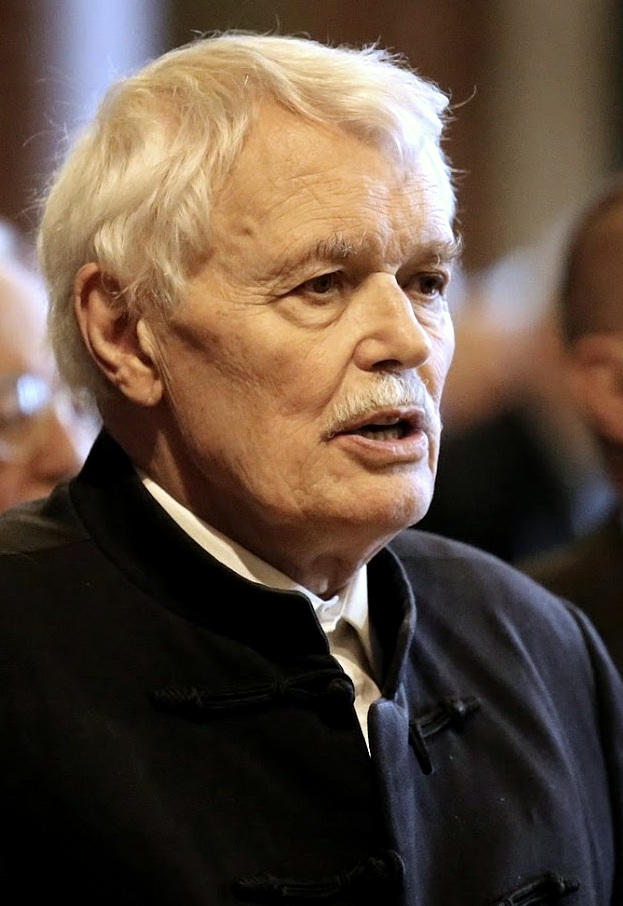

Minister of Education of Hungary
- In office 23 May 1990 – 22 February 1993
- Preceded by: Ferenc Glatz
- Succeeded by: Ferenc Mádl

Personal details
- Born: 17 November 1931 (age 94) Sopron, Hungary
- Party: MDF
- Children: 3
- Profession: ethnographer, politician

Bertalan Andrásfalvy (born 17 November 1931) is a former Hungarian ethnographer and politician, who served as Minister of Education between 1990 and 1993. He joined the Hungarian Democratic Forum in 1988. He became a member of the National Assembly of Hungary in 1990. József Antall appointed him Minister of Education.

He finished the changes requested by the transformation of regime in the Hungarian cultural life. Andrásfalvy left the party in 2005 and joined the National Forum which was founded by Sándor Lezsák who was expelled from the MDF. He lived in Pécs from 1960 to the 1990s when he moved to Hosszúhetény. He was a teacher in the Janus Pannonius University.

== Selected publications ==
- Sárközi hímzések (Bp., 1963)
- A sárköziek gazdálkodása a XVIII. és XIX. században (Pécs, 1965)
- A Sárköz népművészete (alongside Kálmán Vadóc, Bp., 1967)
- A Sárköz ősi ártéri gazdálkodása (Bp., 1973)
- A Duna mente népének ártéri gazdálkodása Tolna és Baranya megyében az ármentesítés befejezéséig (1975)
- A népművészet tegnap és ma (alongside Tamás Hofer, 1976)
- Bibó-emlékkönyv (társszerző, 1980)
- Magyar néptánchagyományok (társszerző, Bp., 1980)
- Mintagyűjtemény Tolna megye népi hímzéseiből (1981)
- Néprajzi alapismeretek (Múzsák Közművelődési Kiadó, Budapest, 1982)
- Sárközi hímzések régen és ma (alongside Julianna Parragh, Bp., 1982)
- Magyar népismeret (néprajzi történészeknek) (Bp., 1990)
- Hagyomány és jövendő. Népismereti tanulmányok (2004)
- A Duna mente népének ártéri gazdálkodása (Ekvilibrium Kft., 2007)

Political offices
| Preceded by Ferenc Glatz | Minister of Education; 1990–1993 | Succeeded by Ferenc Mádl |
