= Domokos Kosáry =

Hungarian writer and historian (1913–2007)

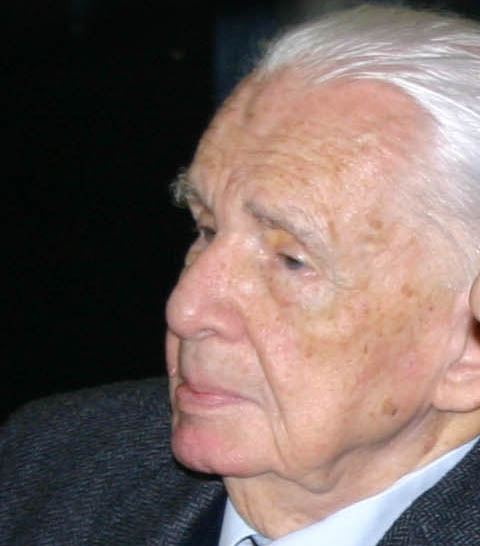
Kosáry in 2005

Domokos Kosáry ([ˈdomokoʃ ˈkoʃaːri], 31 July 1913 – 15 November 2007) was a Hungarian historian and writer who served as president of the Hungarian Academy of Sciences from 1990 until 1996.

== Biography ==
Kosáry was born in Selmecbánya (Banská Štiavnica) and opposed the German occupation and collaboration with Hungary during World War II. He lost influence in Hungary after the war due to the communist takeover of the country for being too "bourgeois". He was imprisoned for his opposition to communism following the failed Hungarian Revolution of 1956.

Kosáry was unanimously elected president of the Hungarian Academy of Sciences (HAS) in 1990 and was re-elected to a second three-year term in 1993. He led the effort to introduce newer, more democratic bye laws at the Hungarian Academy of Sciences. The new laws governing the HAS were enacted by the Parliament of Hungary in 1994.

Kosáry died in Budapest on 15 November 2007 at the age of 95.

== Selected works ==
- A History of Hungary (as Dominic G. Kosary), Benjamin Franklin Bibliophile Society, 1941.
- Kossuth Lajos a Reformkorban [Louis Kossuth in the reform age], 1946.
- Napoleon et la Hongrie, Akademiai Kiado Budapest, 1979
- The Press During the Hungarian Revolution of 1848-1849, East European Monographs, 1987
- Culture and Society in Eighteenth Century Hungary, Corvina, 1987.
- Hungary and International Politics in 1848-1849, East European Monographs, 2003

Cultural offices
Preceded by Iván T. Berend	President of the Hungarian Academy of Sciences; 1990–1996	Succeeded by Ferenc Glatz
