= Akácfa utca =

Street in Erzsébetváros, Budapest, Hungary

Coordinates: 47.4995°N 19.0665°E

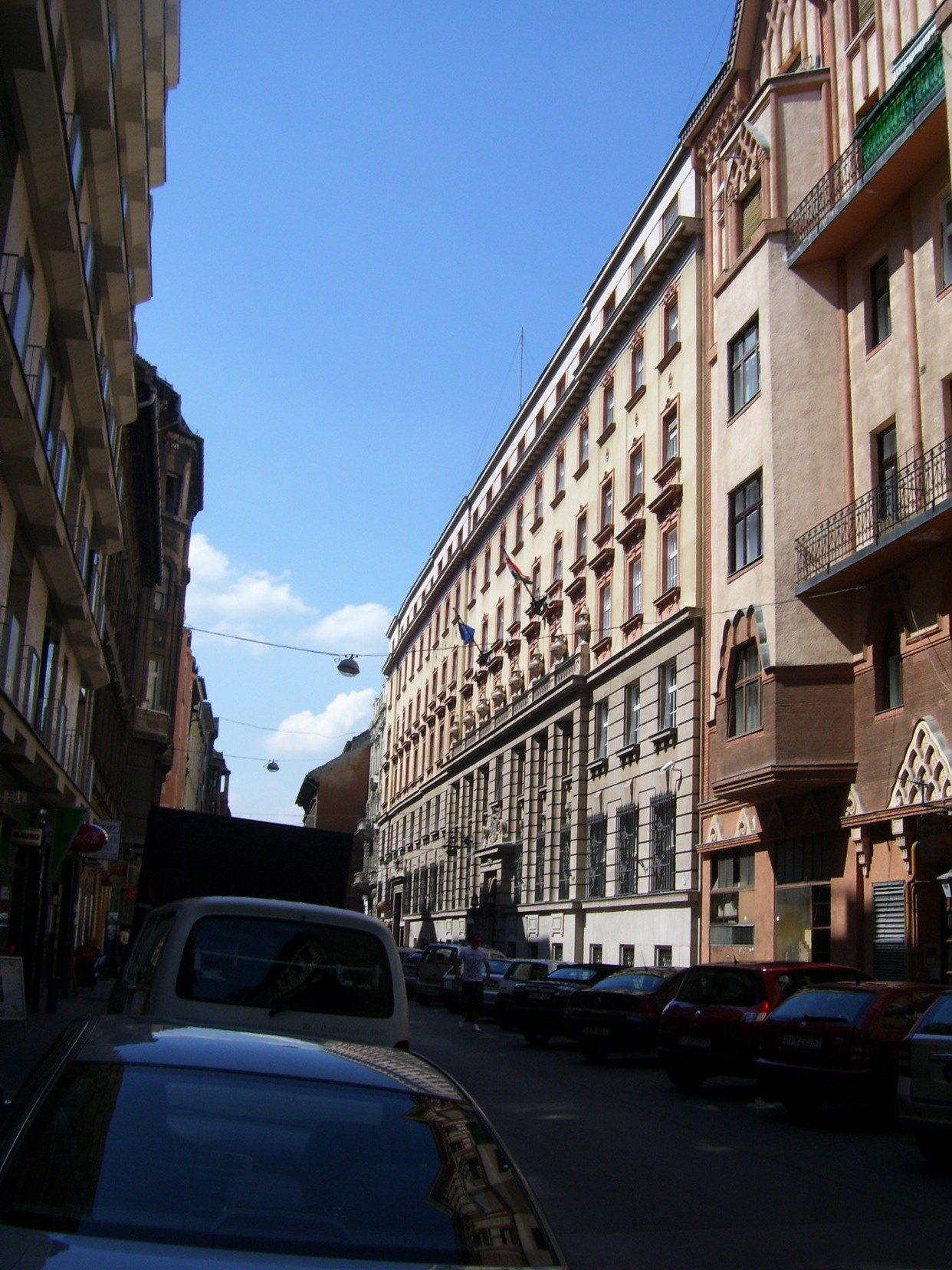
Akácfa utca

Akácfa utca (Acacia Road) is located in Erzsébetváros in Budapest, Hungary, between Rákóczi út and Király utca.

It is named after the Robinia pseudoacacia that dominated the area in the 18th century. This road was initially called Akatziengasse. From 1838, the segment of the road between Dohány utca and Dob utca was still called Akatziengasse (Akácfa utca), but between Dob utcától and Király utca it was known as the Kleine Akatziengasse (Little Acacia Road). These were unified in 1874 and it has been called Akácfa utca since then.

The headquarters of BKV are situated on this street.
