= Matthias Corvinus House =

Building in Cluj-Napoca, Transylvania, Romania

Coordinates: 46°46′16″N 23°35′14″E

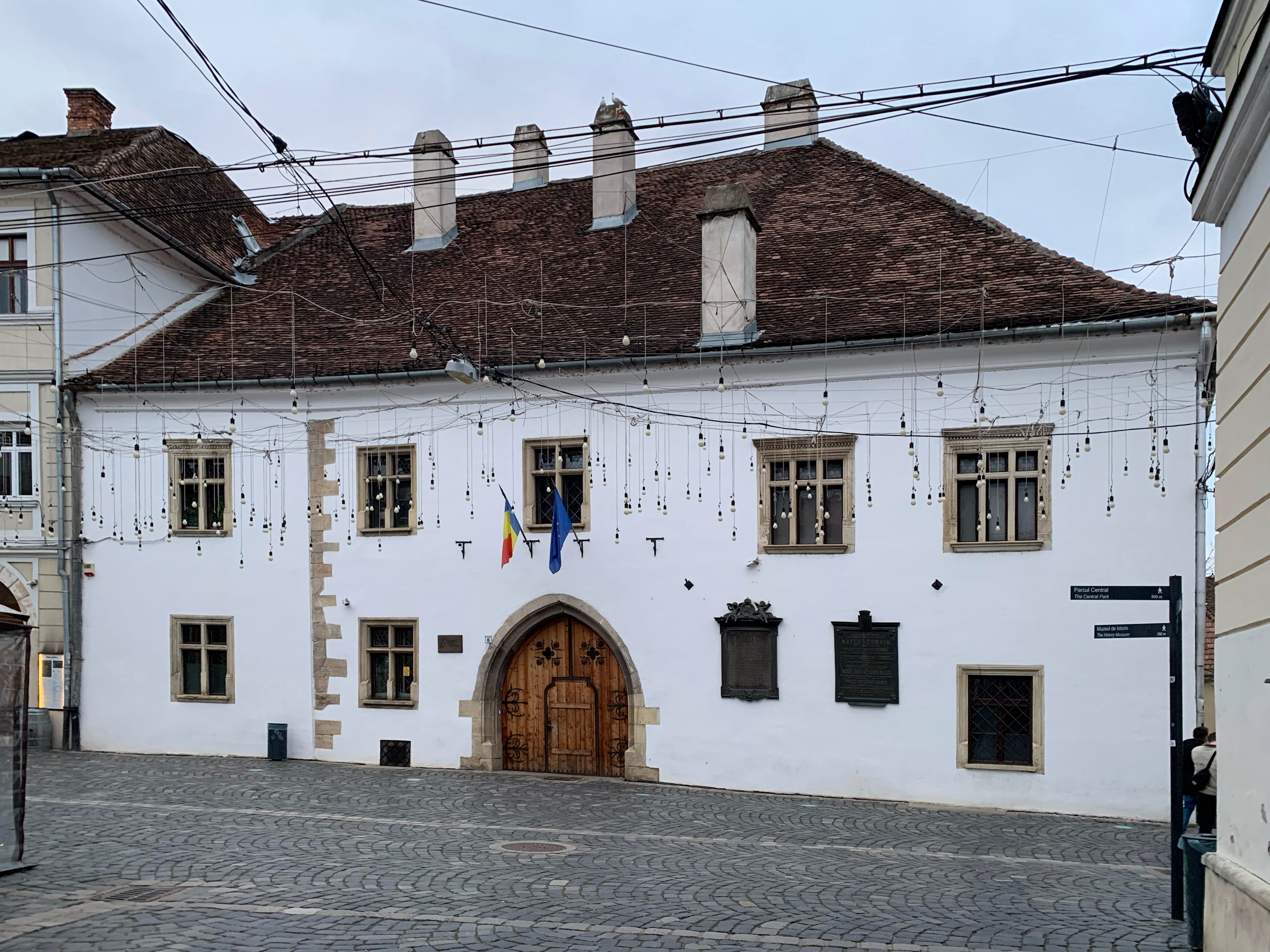
- Interactive map of the Matthias Corvinus House area

General information
- Architectural style: Gothic
- Location: Cluj-Napoca, Romania
- Construction started: 15th century
- Completed: 15th century

The Matthias Corvinus House (Romanian: Casa Matia, Hungarian: Mátyás király szülőháza) is one of the oldest buildings in Cluj-Napoca, Transylvania, Romania. It was built in the 15th century, in the gothic style, as a small guesthouse. During its history, the house served as a jail, hospital, and museum; it is now home to a visual arts institute.

Matthias Corvinus (Hungarian: Hunyadi Mátyás, Romanian: Matia Corvin), son of John Hunyadi, later one of the most renowned Kings of Hungary, was born in this building. That time the house was owned by Jakab (James) Méhffi, who was a well-to-do wine-grower and merchant in the city. On 28 September 1467, king Matthias gave tax and duty exemption privilege for all descendants of the Méhffi family, the owner of the building.

The house has been owned by the Art and Design University of Cluj-Napoca since 1950.
