= Ferenc Glatz =

Hungarian historian and academician

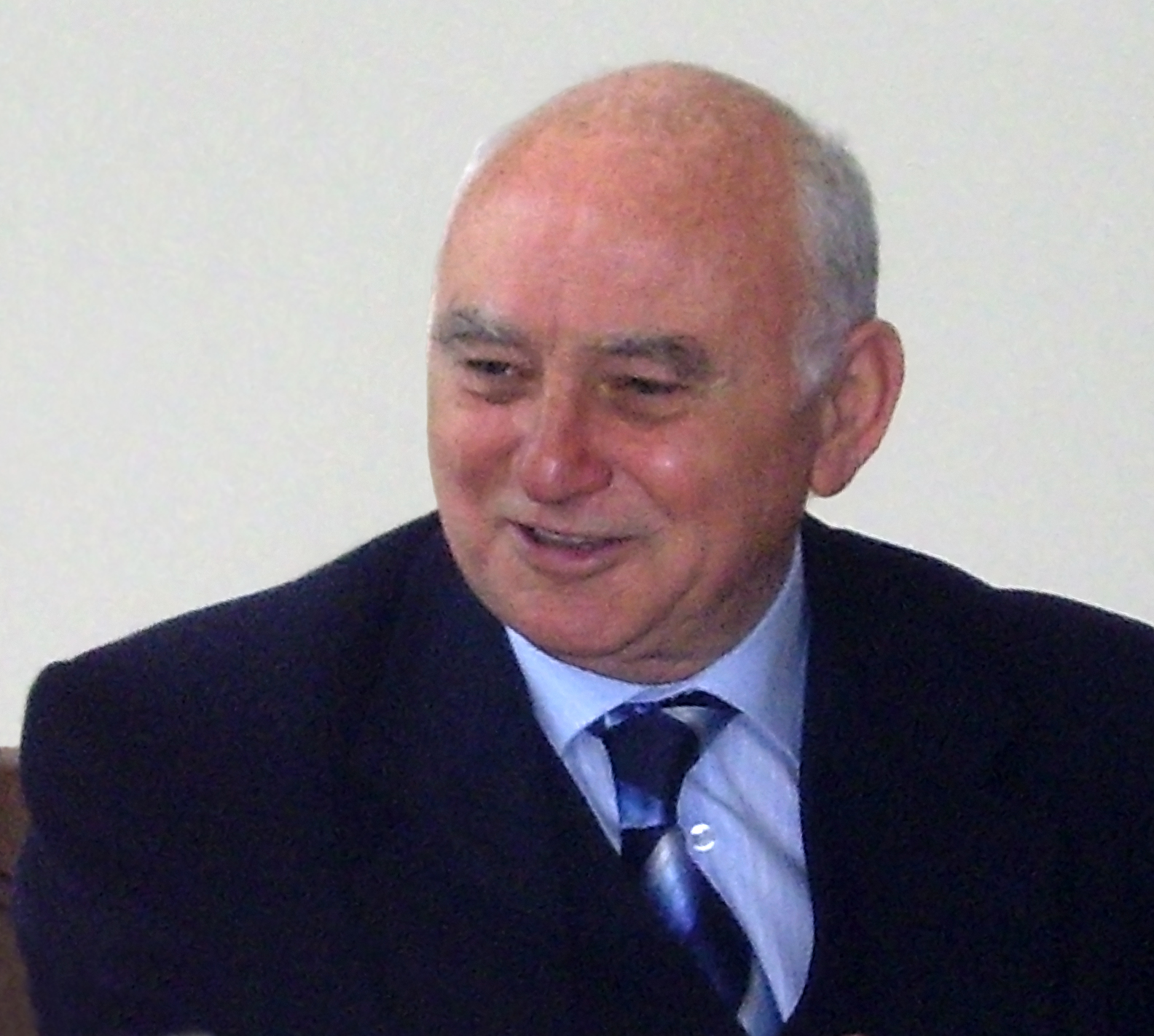

Minister of Education of Hungary
- In office 10 May 1989 – 23 May 1990
- Preceded by: Tibor Czibere
- Succeeded by: Bertalan Andrásfalvy

Personal details
- Born: 2 April 1941 (age 83); Budapest, Kingdom of Hungary
- Political party: MSZMP
- Profession: historian, politician

Ferenc Glatz (born 2 April 1941) is a Hungarian historian and academician. He has served three terms as the president of the Hungarian Academy of Sciences.

== Biography ==
Ferenc Glatz was born in Csepel on 2 April 1941. He attended school in Csepel, Szigetszentmiklós and the Fay Secondary School in Ferencváros and graduated from the Faculty of Humanities of the Eötvös Loránd University (1964).

From 1967 he worked as a researcher in the Institute of History of the Hungarian Academy of Sciences, was appointed Head of Department (1976) and later Director of the Institute (1988). He has been a teacher at the Eötvös Loránd University of Sciences since 1976, is founder of the Department of Historical Museology (1979) and university professor (1990). He has been founding editor-in-chief of the historical political periodical História since 1979. After several study trips abroad (in the Federal Republic of Germany, England, France and the Soviet Union) he was appointed Secretary-General of the Committee of Modern Age Methodology and Source Criticism of the International Committee of Historical Sciences (ICHS) (1985), became Secretary General of the Committee of Historiography (1990–95) and was invited speaker at several World Congresses of Historians. He is author of several books on history and historical theory and of hundreds of scientific studies and collections of essays in Hungarian and various foreign languages.

In 1989–1990 he was Minister of Education and Culture in Miklós Németh's second government, several measures are linked with his name that contributed to the dismantling of the Soviet-type cultural policy system (the abolition of censure and the compulsory education of Russian as a foreign language, the launching of a foreign language teaching programme, the annulment of the state monopoly of school founding, re-regulation of the relationship between the state and the Church, the founding of an alternative framework for financing culture etc.) After the termination of his portfolio in 1990 he became Director of the Institute of History of the HAS again.

He was elected Member of the Hungarian Academy of Sciences in 1993 and became President of the HAS in two subsequent periods between 1996 and 2002. The reformulation of the Academy's social role is considered to be one of his major achievements. He regarded the Academy as a kind of think tank for the nation, which has to pay special attention to the newly emerging possibilities, advantages and turmoil that the nation has to cope with as a result of the political system change and Hungary's accession to the European Union. He initiated and has led the National Strategic Research Programme, the results of which are among others the elaboration of an agricultural programme, strategies for water management, transport, language policy, information technology and environment, the analysis of the social and health care crisis roused by the political system change as well as the minority issue.

Apart from his scientific activity he launched a number of public and civilian initiatives. He is leader of the National Strategic Committee for Land and Water Management (2004), which set the aim of modernising the Tisza and Danube Valley and the Homokhátság (Sand Ridge) region and of easing the social tensions of these regions. The elaboration of the Programme Párbeszéd a vidékért (Dialogue for the countryside) is also linked with his name (2005). The main objectives of this project are the creation of workplaces in rural areas and the promotion of equal opportunities in social and cultural terms.

Since 1991 he has been member of various international committees responsible for preparing the Eastern enlargement of the European Union. He delivered speeches and presented proposals on several European forums in the field of human policy, culture and migration. Given an international mandate he prepared the Central and Eastern European Minority Code (1992), which has also been published in English, German, Slovakian and Romanian. He also participated in the monitoring process of the candidate countries for EU accession between 1994 and 98.

== Published works ==
- Történetíró és politika. Szekfű, Steier, Thim és Miskolczy nemzetről és államról. Budapest, Akadémiai Kiadó, 1980. 235 p.
- Der Zusammenbruch der Habsburger Monarchie und die ungarische Geschichtswissenschaft. Studia Historica Academiae Scientiarum Hungaricae 180. Budapest, Akadémiai Kiadó, 1980. 20 p.
- Nemzeti kultúra – kulturált nemzet 1867–1987. Budapest, Kossuth Kiadó, 1988. 432 p.
- Történetírás korszakváltásban. Budapest, Gondolat Kiadó, 1990. 354 p.
- Europa und Ungarn. Die neue Kulturpolitik nach der Öffnung. Kleine Schriften 17. Vaduz, Verlag der Liechtensteinischen Akademischen Gesellschaft. 1991. 20 p.
- A kisebbségi kérdés Közép-Európában tegnap és ma. História Plusz, 1992/11. p. 62
  - Angolul: Minorities in East-Central Europe. Historical analyses and a policy proposal. Budapest, Europa Institut Budapest, 1993. 63 p.; Németül: Minderheiten in Ost-Mitteleuropa. Historische Analyse und ein Politischer Verhaltenskodex. Budapest, Europa Institut Budapest, 1993. 65 p.; Szlovákul: Otázka Mensín v Strednej Európe. Historická Analyza – Politické Odporúcania. Budapest, Europa Institut Budapest, 1993. 61 p.; Románul: Minoritasti in Europa Centrala. Analiza istorica si un Cod al comportamentelor. Budapest, Europa Institut Budapest, 1993. 63 p.
- Wissenschaftspolitik um die Jahrtausendwende. Budapest, Akadémiai Kiadó, 1999. 142 p.
  - Magyarul: Tudománypolitika az ezredforduló Magyarországán. Magyarország az ezredfordulón. Stratégiai Kutatások a Magyar Tudományos Akadémián. Műhelytanulmányok (Szerk.: Burucs Kornélia) Budapest, Magyar Tudományos Akadémia, 1998. 123 p.
- Tudománypolitikai reformról, Akadémiáról. Beszédek, cikkek, jegyzetek 1996–1997 (Szerk.: Burucs Kornélia) Budapest, Pannonica Kiadó, 2002. 582 p.
- Új szintézis felé. Beszédek, cikkek, jegyzetek 1998–1999 (Szerk.: Burucs Kornélia) Budapest, Pannonica Kiadó, 2002. 518 p.
- Helyünk Európában. Beszédek, cikkek, jegyzetek 1999–2000. (Szerk.: Burucs Kornélia) Budapest, Pannonica Kiadó, 2003. 543 p.
- Magyar millennium Európában. Beszédek, cikkek, jegyzetek 2000–2002. (Szerk.: Burucs Kornélia) Budapest, Pannonica Kiadó, 2004. 720 p.

=== Books with co-authors ===
- Az 1944. év históriája (Összeállította és társszerzőkkel írta.) Budapest, Lapkiadó Vállalat, 1985. 175 p.
- Gesellschaft, Politik und Verwaltung in der Habsburgermonarchie 1830–1918. (Hrsg.: Ferenc Glatz-Ralph Melville.) Wiesbaden-Budapest, Franz Steiner Verlag – Akadémiai Kiadó, 1987. 378 p.
- Magyarok a Kárpát-medencében (Társszerzőkkel összeállította, szerkesztette, összeállította.) Budapest, Lapkiadó Vállalat, 1988. 335 p.
- Etudes Historiques Hongroises 1990. I-VII. (Szerk. és a kötetek bevezetőit írta.) Budapest, MTA TTI, 1990. I. Settlement and Society in Hungary. 319 p.; II. Ethnicity and Society in Hungary. 456 p.; III. Environment and Society in Hungary. 294 p.; IV. European Intellectual Trends and Hungary. 210 p.; V. Reformists and Radicals in Hungary. 221 p.; VI. The Stalinist Model in Hungary. 138 p.; VII. The Selected Bibliography of Hungarian Historical Science 1895–1989. 174 p.
- Palatin Josephs Schriften. Vierter Band 1809–1813. Zusammengestellt und Kommentiert von Sándor Domanovszky (Herausgegeben und Eingeleitet von Ferenc Glatz) Budapest, Akadémiai Kiadó, 1991. 803 p.
- Technika, művelődés. Válogatás Hajnal István kiadott és kiadatlan írásaiból. (Szerkesztette, válogatta, sajtó alá rendezte, a bevezető tanulmányt, a jegyzeteket és az összekötő szöveget írta.) Budapest, MTA TTI, 1993. 472 p.
- A magyarok krónikája (Szerkesztette, összeállította, a kronológiát, az áttekintő fejezeteket és a számos szócikket írta.) Gütersloh, Officina Nova, 1995. 816 p.
- Hungarians and Their Neighbors in Modern Times, 1867–1950. (Ed.: Ferenc Glatz) New York, Columbia University Press, 1995. 347 p.

=== DVD ===
- 1000 évről 100 percben. A magyar állam múltjáról, jövőjéről. [TV-előadás, 2000. augusztus 20.] Szakály István filmje. DVD, 2005

=== Editions ===
- 1963–1967 Századok folyóirat szerkesztőségi titkára
- 1969–1985 Magyarország története tíz kötetben c. könyvsorozat szerkesztőségi titkára
- 1976–1979 Történelmi Szemle folyóirat társszerkesztője
- 1978–1983 Történetírók Tára könyvsorozat alapító sorozatszerkesztője (8 kötet)
- 1979-től História folyóirat felelős szerkesztője
- 1980–1983 Magyarország történeti kronológiája I-IV. szerkesztőségi titkára, a III. (1848–1944) és a IV. (1940–1970) kötet szerkesztője
- 1987-től Társadalom- és művelődéstörténeti tanulmányok könyvsorozat alapító szerkesztője (38 kötet)
- 1987-től Előadások a Történettudományi Intézetben füzetsorozat alapító szerkesztője (19 kötet)
- 1990 Etudes Historiques Hongroises 1990. I-VII. (szerkesztette és a kötetek bevezetőit írta.) Budapest, MTA TTI, 1990. 319 p., 456 p., 294 p., 210 p., 221 p., 138 p., 174 p.
- 1990 Magyarok Európában I-III. kötet szerkesztője
- 1993-tól História Könyvtár alapító szerkesztője. (Alsorozatok: Adattárak és kronológiák: 8 kötet; Monográfiák: 21 kötet; Előadások a történettudomány műhelyeiből: 9 kötet; Okmánytárak: 4 kötet; Történeti bibliográfia: 4 kötet; Atlaszok: 1 kötet)
- 1995-től Begegnungen. Schriftenreihe der Europa Institutes Budapest könyvsorozat szerkesztője (27 kötet)
- 1997-től Magyarország az ezredfordulón. Stratégiai kutatások a Magyar Tudományos Akadémián könyvsorozat alapító szerkesztője (Alsorozatok: Összefoglalók: 40 kötet; Műhelytanulmányok: 28 kötet; Diszciplínaviták: 16 füzet)
- 1997-től Ezredforduló folyóirat alapító szerkesztője
- 1999–2002 Akadémiai műhely könyvsorozat alapító szerkesztője (Alsorozatok: Emlékbeszédek az MTA elhunyt tagjai felett: 2 kötet; Székfoglalók a Magyar Tudományos Akadémián: 5 kötet; Közgyűlési előadások: 10 kötet; Tudomány Magyarországon. Országgyűlési jelentés: 2 kötet; A Magyar Tudományos Akadémia Almanachja: 2 kötet; A Magyar Tudományos Akadémia kutatóintézete:i 29 füzet)
- 2002-től Magyar Tudománytár alapító szerkesztője (6 kötet)
- 2003 A Magyar Tudományos Akadémia tagjai I-III. kötet
- 2007-től Természettörténet könyvsorozat alapító szerkesztője (megjelenés alatt)

== Awards ==
- 1990: Cross of Honor for Science and Art of the Austrian Republic (1st Class)
- 1994: Freedom Cultural-Scientific Grand Prize, World Jewish Congress
- 1995: Széchenyi Prize, President of the Republic of Hungary
- 1996: Pro Minorities Prize, Government of the Republic of Hungary
- 1997: Jedlik Ányos Prize Honoris causa, National Patent Office
- 1997: Herder Prize
- 1998: Interfaith Gold Medallion (London), International Council of Jews and Christians
- 2003: Grand Cross of Honor of the German Federal Republic
- 2003: Presidential Silver Medal of the Republic of Italy
- 2004: Grand Cross of Honor of the Republic of Hungary

Political offices
| Preceded by Tibor Czibere | Minister of Education; 1989–1990 | Succeeded by Bertalan Andrásfalvy |
Cultural offices
| Preceded by Domokos Kosáry | President of the Hungarian Academy of Sciences; 1996–2002 | Succeeded by Szilveszter Vizi |
