= Hungarian Academy of Sciences =

Learned society of Hungary

- Magyar Tudományos Akadémia
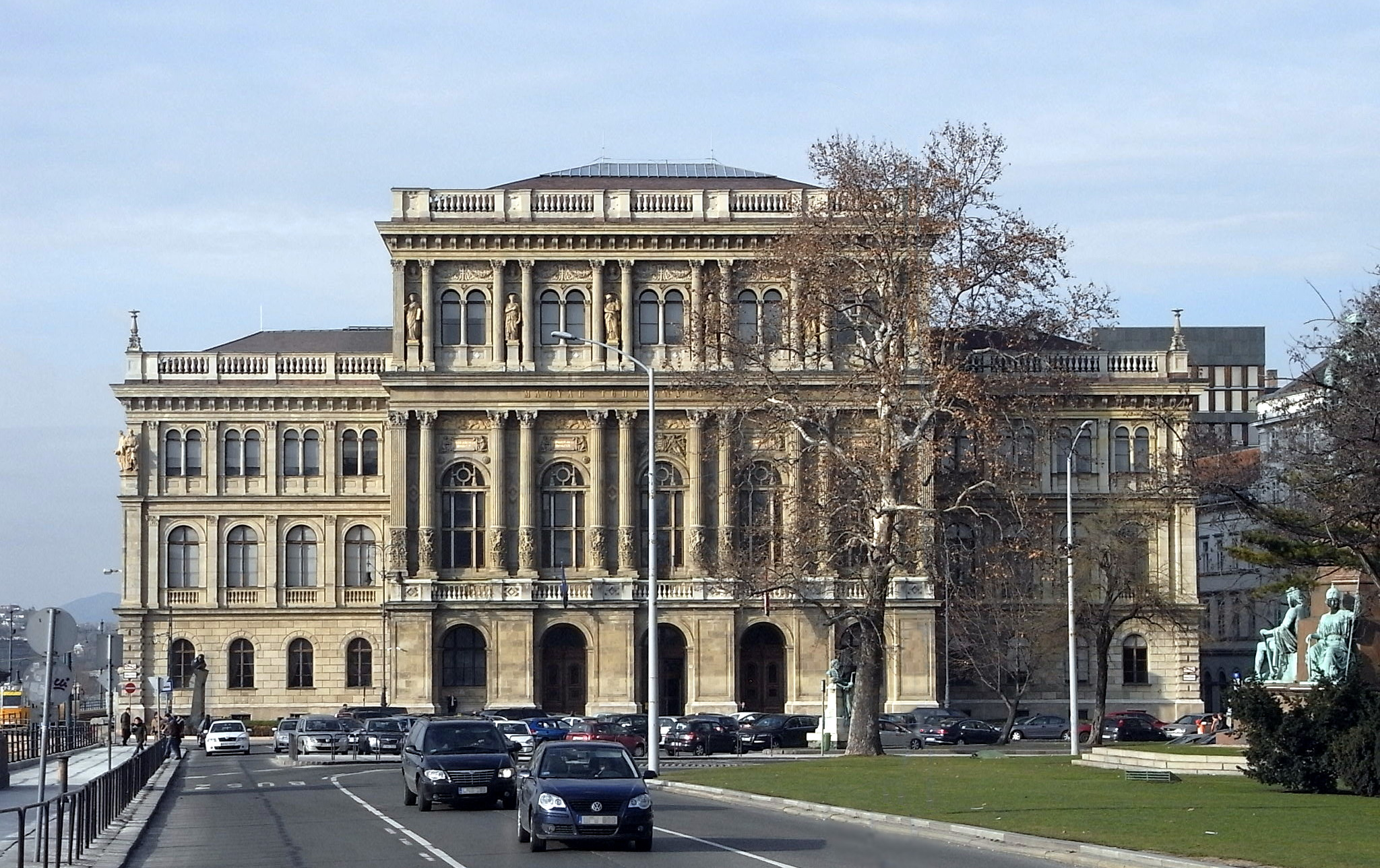
- The seat of the academy on the bank of the Danube in Budapest
- Abbreviation: MTA
- Formation: 3 November 1825; 200 years ago
- Type: National academy
- Headquarters: Budapest, Hungary
- Location: Budapest, Arany János u. 1, 1051 Hungary
- Coordinates: 47.5011°N 19.0464°E
- Region served: Hungary
- Members: 1,363 (2014)
- President: Tamás Freund
- Website: mta.hu/english/
- Formerly called: Magyar Tudós Társaság

The Hungarian Academy of Sciences (Hungarian: Magyar Tudományos Akadémia [ˈmɒɟɒr ˈtudomaːɲoʃ ˈɒkɒdeːmijɒ], MTA) is the most important and prestigious learned society of Hungary. Its seat is at the bank of the Danube in Budapest, between Széchenyi rakpart and Akadémia utca. Its main responsibilities are the cultivation of science, dissemination of scientific findings, supporting research and development, and representing Hungarian science domestically and around the world.

== History ==
The history of the academy began in 1825 when Count István Széchenyi offered one year's income of his estate for the purposes of a Learned Society at a district session of the Diet in Pressburg (Pozsony, present Bratislava, seat of the Hungarian Parliament at the time), and his example was followed by other delegates. Its task was specified as the development of the Hungarian language and the study and propagation of the sciences and the arts in Hungarian. It received its current name in 1845.

Its central building was inaugurated in 1865, in Renaissance Revival architecture style. The architect was Friedrich August Stüler.

== Sections ==
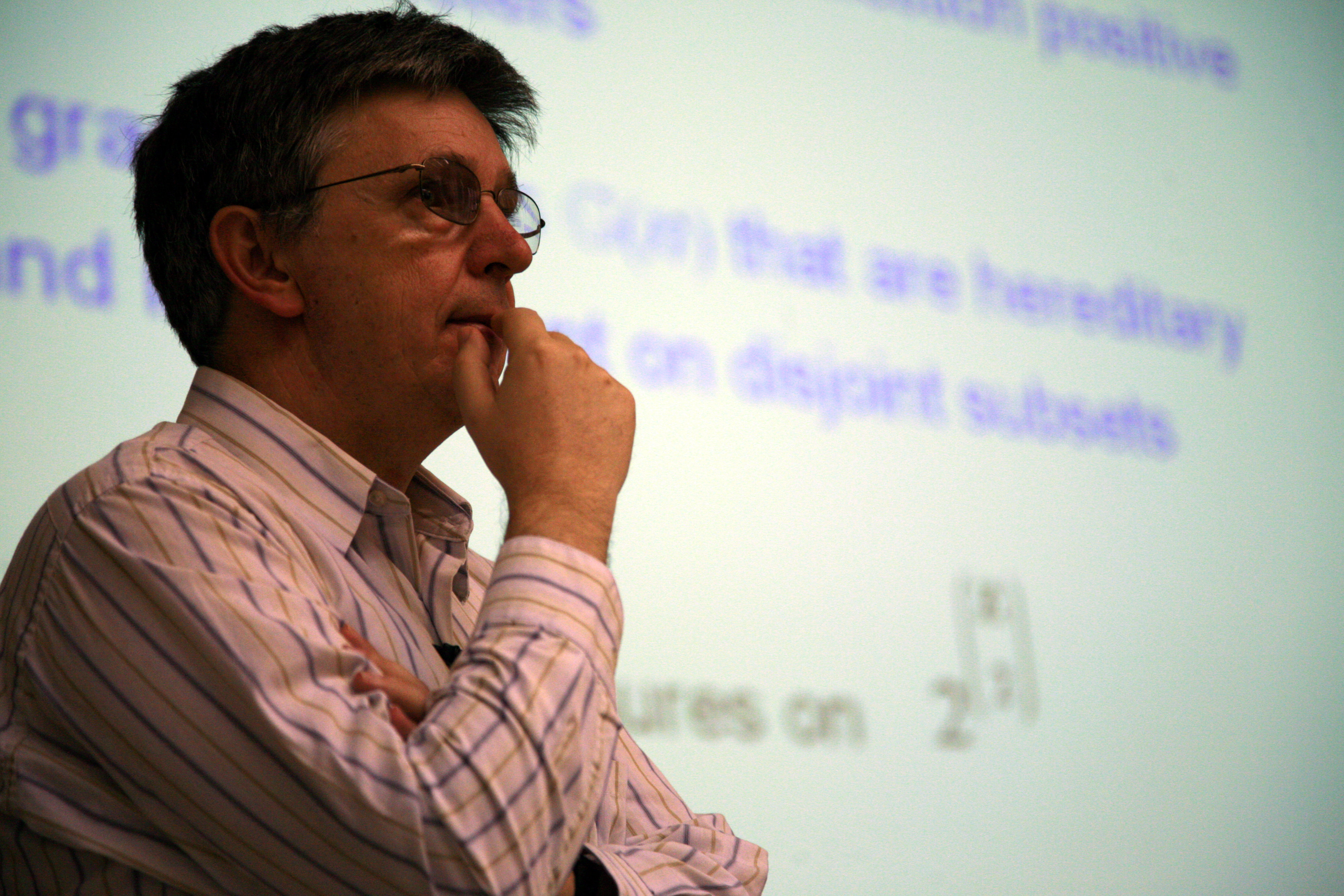
László Lovász, the president of the academy till 2020. Previously he served as the president of International Mathematical Union.

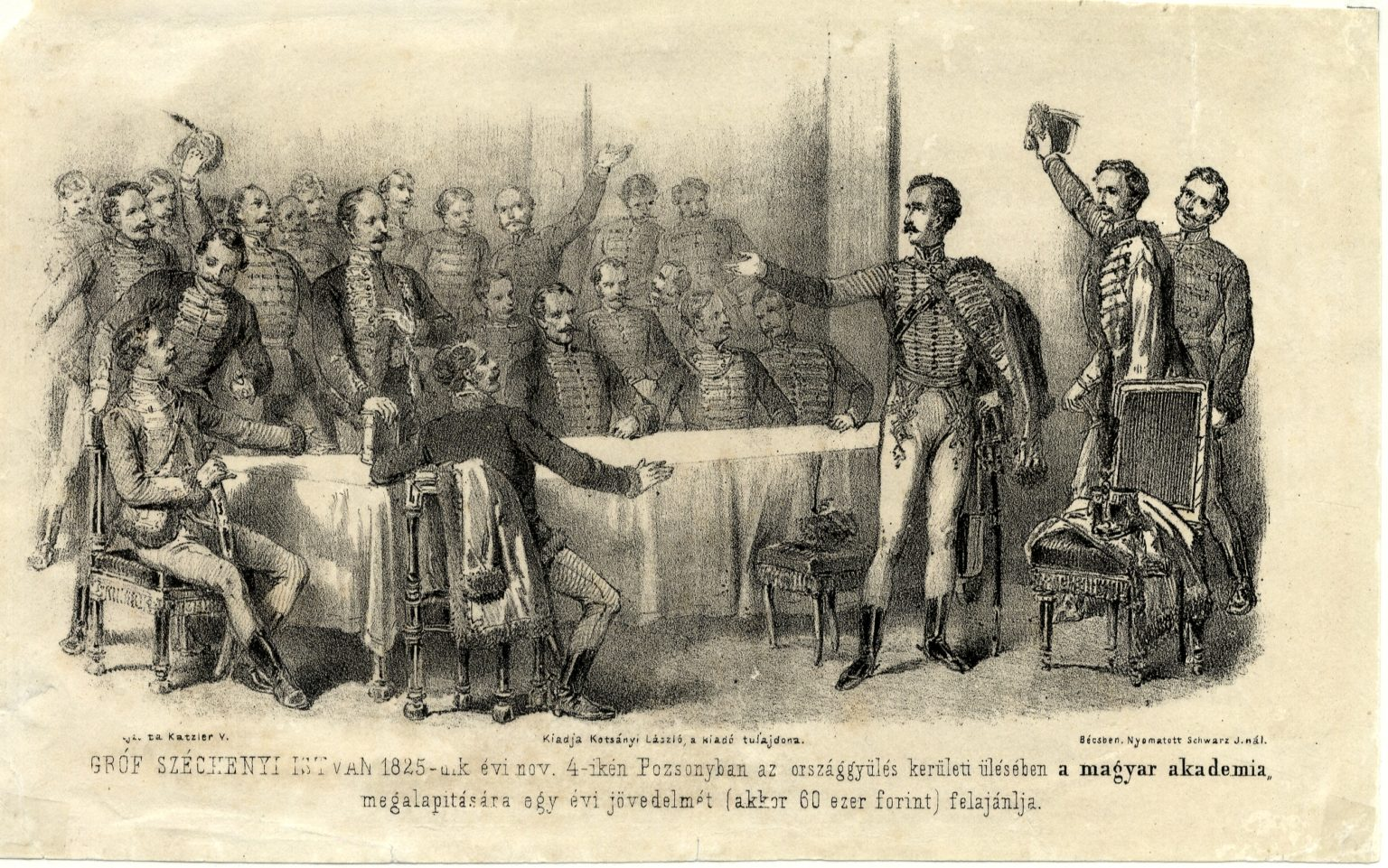
Count István Széchenyi offers one year's income of his estate for the purposes of a learned society.

A scientific section is a unit of the academy organized by one or some closely related branches of science. A scientific section follows with attention, promotes and evaluates all scientific activities conducted within its field(s) of science; takes a stand on scientific issues as well as in matters concerning science policy and research organization, submits opinion on the activities of the academy's research institutes, and on those of university chairs and other research units that are supported by the academy, and participates in the procedure of awarding the title of Doctor of the Hungarian Academy of Sciences, the post-Ph.D. academic degree, the D.Sc. degree in Hungary.

Today it has eleven main sections:

1. Linguistics and Literary Scholarship
2. Philosophy and Historical Sciences
3. Mathematics
4. Agricultural Sciences
5. Medical Sciences
6. Engineering Sciences
7. Chemical Sciences
8. Biological Sciences
9. Economics and Law
10. Earth Sciences
11. Physical Sciences

== Research institutes until 2019 ==
- MTA Agricultural Research Centre
- MTA Chemical Research Center
- MTA Research Centre for Astronomy and Earth Sciences (involved with Konkoly Observatory)
- MTA Szeged Research Centre for Biology
- MTA Centre for Ecological Research
- MTA Research Centre for Economic and Regional Studies
- MTA Centre for Energy Research
- MTA Research Centre for the Humanities
- MTA Research Institute for Linguistics
- MTA Rényi Institute of Mathematics
- MTA Institute of Experimental Medicine
- MTA Research Centre for Natural Sciences
- MTA Institute of Nuclear Research
- MTA Wigner Research Centre for Physics
- MTA Centre for Social Sciences

== Presidents of the Hungarian Academy of Sciences ==
Count József Teleki	17 November 1830 – 15 February 1855
Count Emil Dessewffy	17 April 1855 – 10 January 1866
Baron József Eötvös	18 March 1866 – 2 February 1871
Baron Menyhért Lónyay	17 May 1871 – 3 November 1884
Dr. Ágoston Trefort	28 May 1885 – 22 August 1888
Baron Loránd Eötvös	3 May 1889 – 5 October 1905
Albert Berzeviczy	27 November 1905 – 22 March 1936
Archduke Joseph Habsburg	22 March 1936 – October 1944
Gyula Kornis	7 March 1945 – 29 October 1945
Gyula Moór	29 October 1945 – 24 July 1946
Zoltán Kodály	24 July 1946 – 29 November 1949
István Rusznyák	29 November 1949 – 5 February 1970
Tibor Erdey-Grúz	5 February 1970 – 16 August 1976
János Szentágothai	26 October 1976 – 10 May 1985
Iván T. Berend	10 May 1985 – 24 May 1990
Domokos Kosáry	24 May 1990 – 9 May 1996
Ferenc Glatz	9 May 1996 – 4 May 2002
Szilveszter Vizi	5 May 2002 – 6 May 2008
József Pálinkás	6 May 2008 – 5 May 2014
László Lovász	6 May 2014 – 31 July 2020
Tamás Freund	1 August 2020 – 31 May 2026
Mihály Pósfai	1 June 2026 – present

=== Széchenyi Academy of Literature and Arts ===
The Széchenyi Academy of Literature and Arts (Hungarian: Széchenyi Irodalmi és Művészeti Akadémia) was created in 1992 as an academy associated yet independent from the MTA. Some of the known members are György Konrád, Magda Szabó, Péter Nádas writers, Zoltán Kocsis pianist, Miklós Jancsó, István Szabó film directors. The last president was Károly Makk, film director, who succeeded László Dobszay (resigned on 20 April 2011).

== See also ==
- Open access in Hungary
- HUN-REN Wigner Research Centre for Physics
