= Sándor Csernus bibliography =

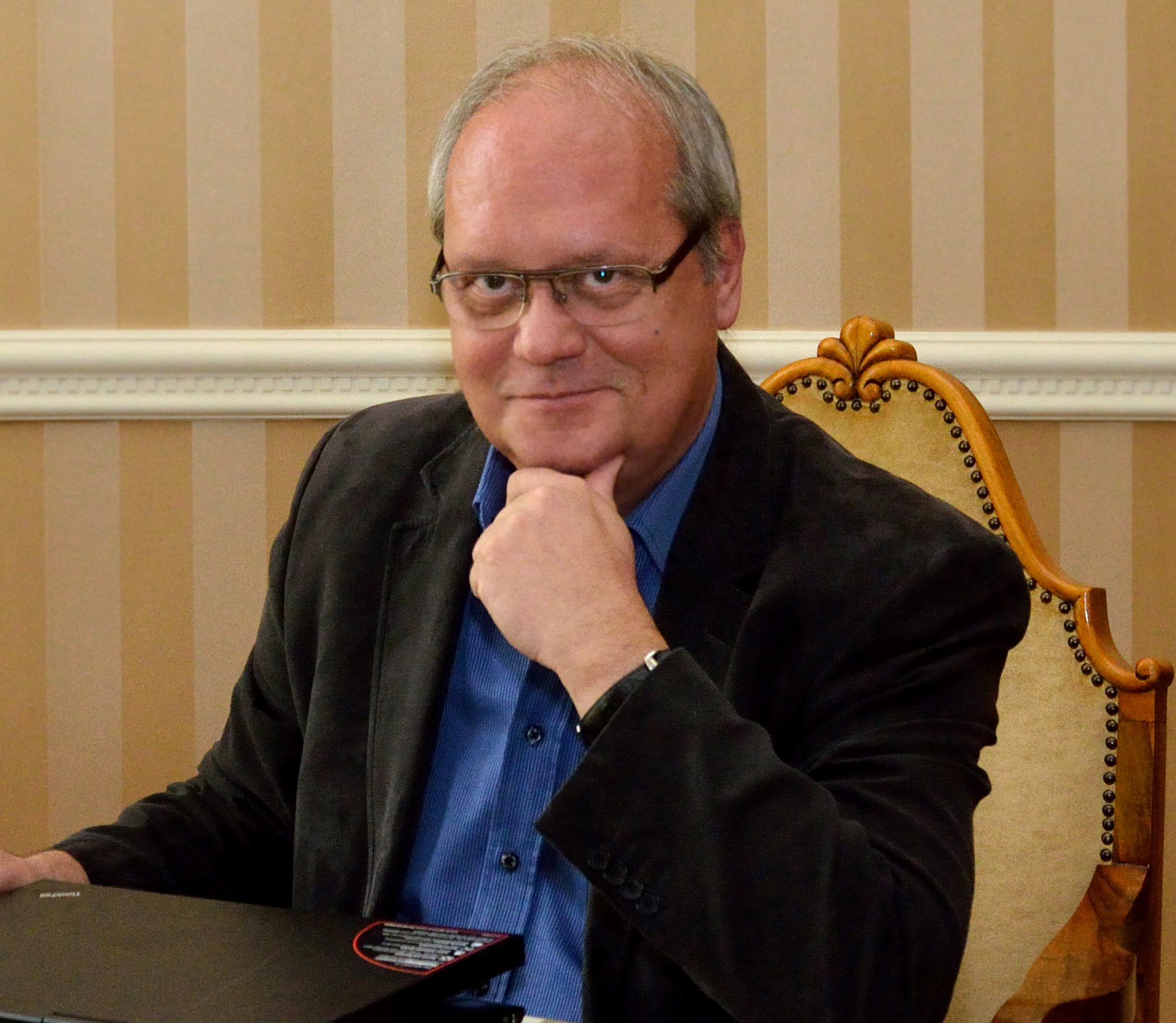
Sándor Csernus

This is a list of writings published by the Hungarian historian Sándor Csernus. He has written and published his works in Hungarian, English, German, and French.

== List ==
=== 1975 ===
- Csernus, Sándor: "Zsigmond nyugat-európai diplomáciai tevékenysége a konstanzi zsinat időszakában: (1414–1418)". ACTA IUVENUM SECTIO HISTORICA 7: pp. 29–64. (1975)

=== 1978 ===
- Csernus, Sándor: A zsigmondi magyar állam külpolitikája 1420-ig, különös tekintettel Nyugat-Európára 180 p., doktori disszertáció.

=== 1983 ===
- Csernus, Sándor: "A nemzetközi kapcsolatok rendszerének átalakulása Nyugat-Európában a 15. század elején". ACTA HISTORICA (SZEGED) 76: pp. 11–23. (1983)

=== 1986 ===
- Bravard, J-P, Bethemont, J, Csernus, S (ford): "Gabcikovo: Un grand projet et une controverse". REVUE DE GÉOGRAPHIE DE LYON 61:(1) pp. 19–41. (1986)
- Kornai, János, Richet, Xavier (szerk.) Egyéb szerzőség: Csernus, Anikó, Csernus, Sándor, Xavier, Richet, Madeleine Tchimichkian (ford.); La Voie hongroise: Analyses et expérimentations économiques Paris: Calmann-Lévy, 1986. 319 p. (Perspectives de l'économique. Économie contemporaine) (ISBN 2-7021-1378-8)

=== 1987 ===
- Fehérvári, Géza, Csernus, Sándor (szerk.): Az iszlám művészet története Budapest: Képzőművészeti Kiadó, 1987. 570 p. (ISBN 963 336 348 9)

=== 1988 ===
- Csernus, Sándor: "Mutation de l'historiographie francaise et elargissement de son horizon au XVe siecle: Un exemple: 'les affaires de Hongrie'" ACTA HISTORICA (SZEGED) 87: pp. 3–18. (1988)
- Csernus, Sándor: "'Lanselot, Roy de Honguerie et de Behaigne': Naissance et épanouissement d'un mythe au milieu du quinzième siècle" ACTA UNIVERSITATIS SZEGEDIENSIS DE ATTILA JOZSEF NOMINATAE ACTA ROMANICA 13: pp. 93–117. (1988)

=== 1989 ===
- Csernus, Sándor: "A „Fehér Lovag”: A Hunyadi-mítosz kérdéséhez a 15. sz.-i francia történeti irodalomban" In: Kulcsár Péter, Mader Béla, Monok István (szerk.): Tanulmányok Karácsonyi Béla hetvenedik születésnapjára. 157 p. Szeged: JATE Központi Könyvtára; JATE BTK Magyar Történeti Intézet, 1989. pp. 81–117. (ISBN 963-481-818-8)

=== 1990 ===
- Csernus, Sándor: "Perspectives politiques et tentatives de regroupement territorial au début du quinzième siècle: Quelques aspects internationaux" In: Congrès national des sociétés savantes (szerk.) Les pays de l'entre-deux au Moyen Âge : questions d'histoire des territoires d'Empire entre Meuse, Rhône et Rhin: Actes du 113e Congrès National des Sociétés Savantes (Strasbourg, 1988), Section d'histoire médiévale et de philologie. Konferencia helye, ideje: Strasbourg, Franciaország, 1988.04.05-1988.04.09. Paris: Comité des travaux historiques et scientifiques (CTHS), 1990. pp. 155–171. (ISBN 2-7355-0197-3)
- Csernus, Sándor: "Quelques aspects européens du conflit armagnac-bourguignon: Sigismond et la France des partis" In: Ministère de l'Éducation Nationale de la Jeunesse et des Sports (szerk.): Violence et contestation au Moyen Age: Actes du 114e Congrès National des Sociétés Savantes (Paris, 1989), Section d'histoire médiévale et de philologie. Konferencia helye, ideje: Paris, Franciaország, 1989.04.03-1989.04.09. Paris: Comité des travaux historiques et scientifiques (CTHS), 1990. pp. 305–318 (ISBN 2-7355-0198-1)

=== 1991 ===
- Csernus, Sándor: "Sigismond et la soustraction d’obédience: Une doctrine de politique internationale?" In: Ministère de l'Éducation Nationale (szerk.): Crises et réformes dans l’église de la réforme grégorienne à la préréforme: Actes du 115e Congrès National des Sociétés Savantes (Avignon, 1990), Section d’histoire médiévale et de philologie. Konferencia helye, ideje: Avignon, Franciaország, 1990.04.09-1990.04.13. Paris: Comité des travaux historiques et scientifiques (CTHS), 1991. pp. 315–335. (ISBN 2-7355-0226-0)
- Csernus, Sándor, Kövér, Lajos: Helytörténet és nemzeti történet Franciaországban: Ismertetés és beszámoló a Tudós Társaságok Országos Konferenciáinak rendszeréről VILÁGTÖRTÉNET 13:(2-3) pp. 74–78. (1991)

=== 1993 ===
- Csernus, Sándor: "Réflexions sur l'édition d'un roman médiéval: Le Roman de Messire Charles de Hongrie; Texte en prose de la fin du 15ème siècle", édité par Marie-Luce Chenerie (Compte rendu) CAHIERS D'ETUDES HONGROISES 5: pp. 275–280. (1993)
- Csernus, Sándor: "A 15. századi francia útleírások Magyarország-képe" In: Békési Imre, Jankovics József, Kósa László, Nyerges Judit (szerk.): Régi és új peregrináció : magyarok külföldön, külföldiek Magyarországon [3 kötet]: [III. Nemzetközi Hungarológiai Kongresszus]. 1823 p. Konferencia helye, ideje: Szeged, Magyarország, 1991.08.12-1991.08.16. Budapest; Szeged: Nemzetközi Magyar Filológiai Társaság; Scriptum, 1993. pp. 1006–1020. (ISBN 963-8335-00-9)
- Csernus, Sánor (szakértő): Ismeretlen barátaink: A Magyarországra menekült francia hadifoglyok történetéből; Dokumentumfilm

=== 1994 ===
- Bizzarro, A, Csernus, S (szakértő): Le Bleu dans les Étoiles CSM Productions, Paris -Luxembourg, 24 részes, Európa történetét költött epizódokban, de valós környezetben és részben valós történelmi személyiségek ábrázolásával bemutató rajzfilmsorozat (1994)
- Csernus, Sándor: "Voyage, récit de voyage et la Hongrie dans la littérature historique française des 14e et 15e siècles' In: Tverdota György (szerk.): Écrire le voyage. 272 p. Paris: Presses de la Sorbonne Nouvelle, 1994. pp. 125–143.
- Csernus, Sándor: Villehardouin, Geoffroy de In: Kristó Gyula, Engel Pál, Makk Ferenc (szerk.): Korai magyar történeti lexikon (9-14. század). 753 p. Budapest: Akadémiai Kiadó, 1994. p. 703. ISBN 9630567229)
- Csernus, Sándor: Clari, Robert de In: Kristó Gyula, Engel Pál, Makk Ferenc (szerk.): Korai magyar történeti lexikon (9-14. század). 753 p. Budapest: Akadémiai Kiadó, 1994. p. 140. (ISBN 9630567229)
- Csernus, Sándor: "Joinville, Jean sire de" In: Kristó Gyula, Engel Pál, Makk Ferenc (szerk.): Korai magyar történeti lexikon (9-14. század). 753 p. Budapest: Akadémiai Kiadó, 1994. p. 307. (ISBN 9630567229)
- Csernus, Sándor, et al: "La Hongrie" In: Frémy D, Frémy M (szerk.). Quid 1995. Paris: Editions Robert Laffont, 1994. pp. 1020–1023. (ISBN 2-221-07813-6)
- Csernus, Sándor: "Les Hunyadi vus par les historiens français du 15e siècle" In: Klaniczay T, Jankovics J (szerk.): Matthias Corvinus and Humanism in Central Europe. 280 p. Budapest: Balassi Kiadó, 1994. pp. 75–95. (Studia humanitatis (ISSN 0324-7880); 10.) (ISBN 963-7873-72-4)

=== 1995 ===
- Csernus, Sándor: "Történelem és fikció: Magyarországi Károly úr regénye" ACTA HISTORICA (SZEGED) 99: pp. 5–29. (1995)
- Csernus, Sándor: "Les Français dans les villes de la Hongrie médiévale" In: Résumés; 120e Congrès National des Sociétés Historiques et Scientifiques: Aix-en-Provence, 23-29 octobre 1995. Konferencia helye, ideje: Aix-en-Provence, Franciaország, 1995.10.23-1995.10.29. Paris: Comité des travaux historiques et scientifiques (CTHS), pp. 110–111.
- Csernus, Sándor: "Francia források Zsigmond párizsi tartózkodásáról (1416 március)" In: Koszta László (szerk.): Kelet és Nyugat között: Történeti tanulmányok Kristó Gyula tiszteletére. 521 p. Szeged: Szegedi Középkorász Műhely, 1995. pp. 103–140 (ISBN 963 482 083 2)
- Csernus, Sándor: "Pro Christo et contra inimicos eius.": Buda, 1686. CAHIERS D'ETUDES HONGROISES 7: pp. 68–77. (1995)
- Csernus, Sándor: "A francia IUT-rendszer tapasztalatai" In: Dobay P (szerk.): Tanulmányok a post-secondary képzésekről: TEMPUS CME Projekt. Pécs; Budapest: Tempus Magyarországi Iroda, 1995. pp. 21–35.

=== 1996 ===
- Csernus, Sándor: "Krisztusért és az ô ellenségei ellen.": A Maigret grófok adománylevele 1687-bôl AETAS: TÖRTÉNETTUDOMÁNYI FOLYÓIRAT 1996:(2-3) pp. 244–255. (1996)
- Csernus, Sándor: "A francia expanzió fő irányai : Jeruzsálem, Trója, Róma" [Les orientations principales de l’expansion française au Moyen-âge: Jérusalem, Troie, Rome] In: Kukovecz György (szerk.): A Mediterráneum az európai történelemben és a politikában [La Méditerranée et l'Europe: histoire et politique]. Szeged: József Attila Tudományegyetem (JATE), 1996. pp. 19–21. (Kék Füzetek)

=== 1997 ===
- Csernus, Sándor: A középkori francia nyelvű történetírás és Magyarország: 13-15. sz. 25 p.
- Emmanuel Le Roy Ladurie, Csernus, Sándor, Tóth Annamária, Szász Géza (szerk.): Montaillou, egy okszitán falu életrajza (1294-1324) Budapest: Osiris Kiadó, 1997. 607 p. (Osiris Könyvtár. Történelem) (ISBN 963-379-132-4)

=== 1998 ===
- Csernus, Sándor: "A francia nyelvű történetírás kialakulása és főbb jellemzői" ACTA HISTORICA (SZEGED) 106: pp. 3–29. (1998)
- Csernus, Sándor: "Zsigmond és a Hunyadiak a francia történetírásban" SZÁZADOK 132:(1) pp. 47–127. (1998)
- Csernus, Sándor: "Les orientations principales de l’expansion de la France médiévale: Jérusalem, Rome, Troie" In: Kukovecz György (szerk.): La Méditerranée et l'Europe : histoire et politique. 205 p. Konferencia helye, ideje: Szeged, Magyarország, 1996.10.11 Szeged: JATEPress Kiadó, 1998. pp. 195–197. (Kék füzetek; A Mediterrán tanulmányok különszáma) (ISBN 963-482-281-9)
- Csernus, Sándor: "Konstantinápoly bűvöletében: A IV. keresztes hadjárat és a francia történetírás kezdetei" In: Makk Ferenc, Tar Ibolya, Wojtilla Gyula (szerk.): Studia varia: Tanulmányok Szádeczky-Kardoss Samu nyolcvanadik születésnapjára. 185 p. Szeged: József Attila Tudományegyetem (JATE), 1998. pp. 31–45. (ISBN 963-482-328-9)
- Csernus, Sándor: "Lancelot király és Magyarország mint a „Kereszténység védőbástyája” a 15. sz.-i francia történetírásban" In: Jankovics József, Monok István, Nyerges Judit, Sárközy Péter (szerk.). A magyar művelődés és a kereszténység. [La civiltá ungherese e il cristianesimo]. I-III. kötet: A IV. Nemzetközi Hungarológiai Kongresszus előadásai [Atti del IV Congresso Internazionale di Studi Ungheresi]. 1891 p. Konferencia helye, ideje: Roma; Napoli, Olaszország, 1996.09.09-1996.09.14. Budapest; Szeged: Nemzetközi Magyar Filológiai Társaság; Scriptum, 1998. pp. 580–596. (ISBN 963-8335-53-X; ISBN 963-8335-54-8; ISBN 963-8335-55-6; ISBN 963-8335-56-4)
- Csernus, Sándor. "La Toison d’Or et l’Europe, aspects politiques: L’Europe Centrale du XVe au XVIIIe siècles" In: Richard J, Liez J-L (szerk.): La toison d'or : un mythe européen: Édité à l'occasion de l'Exposition La Toison d'Or, un Mythe Européen, 5 septembre - 13 décembre 1998, Château de Malbrouck à Manderen, Moselle. Metz; Paris: Serpenoise; Somogy, 1998. pp. 85–93 (ISBN 978-2-85056-317-1)
- Csernus, Sándor: "A dél-alföldi felsőoktatás a régió gazdaságáért: A 'Dalphareg-program' záróértékelése" In: Oktatás a gazdaság szolgálatában : "Az oktatás és a gazdaság kapcsolatainak erősítése" című Phare Program zárókonferenciája : 1998. június 12-13, Siófok [Education serving the needs of economy : "Strengthening the links between education and the economy" Phare Program HU-94.05 final conference]. 197 p. Konferencia helye, ideje: Siófok, Magyarország, 1998.06.12-1998.06.13. Budapest: MKM Phare PMU, p. &.1. kötet
- Karáth, Tamás, Csernus, Sándor (szakmai lekt) (szerk.): Tervezet a kereszténység leendő békéjéről: Podjebrád-béketerv, 1464 pp. 1–31. Fordította és a bevezető tanulmányt írta Karáth Tamás. - Szeged : JATE Történész Diákkör, 1998. - 31 p. - (Documenta historica, 1216-0954; 39.). - A fordított dokumentum eredeti címe: Tractatus pacis toti Christianitati fiendae, 963-482-288-6 (1998)

=== 1999 ===
- Clari, R. de, Csernus, Sándor (ford): "Konstantinápoly egy keresztes lovag szemével" In: Sz. Jónás I (szerk.): Középkori egyetemes történeti szöveggyűjtemény: Európa és a Közel-Kelet IV-XV. század. 579 p. Budapest: Osiris Kiadó, 1999. pp. 226–230 (ISBN 963-379-549-4)
- Clercq, Jacques du, Csernus, Sándor (ford): "László magyar király követsége Franciaországban" In: Sz. Jónás I (szerk.): Középkori egyetemes történeti szöveggyűjtemény: Európa és a Közel-Kelet IV-XV. század. 579 p. Budapest: Osiris Kiadó, 1999. pp. 568–570. (ISBN 963-379-549-4)
- Commynes, Philippe de Egyéb szerzőség: Csernus, Sándor (ford.); "Két uralkodói portré Commynes emlékirataiban: XI. Lajos és Mátyás" In: Sz. Jónás I (szerk.): Középkori egyetemes történeti szöveggyűjtemény: Európa és a Közel-Kelet IV-XV. század. 579 p. Budapest: Osiris Kiadó, 1999. pp. 570–572. (ISBN 963-379-549-4)
- Csernus, Sándor: "A reneszánsz fejedelemtükrök forrásvidékén: Philippe de Commynes, a 'francia Machiavelli'" SZÁZADOK 133:(1) pp. 125–144. (1999)
- Csernus, Sándor: "A francia Machiavelli: Philippe de Commynes" In: Kukovecz György (szerk.): A modern politikai gondolkodás kezdetei: Eszmék és folyamatok. Konferencia helye, ideje: Szeged, Magyarország, 1996.04.18 Szeged: JATEPress Kiadó, 1999. pp. 43–62. (Kék füzetek) (ISBN 963 482 406 4)
- Csernus, Sándor: A középkori francia nyelvű történetírás és Magyarország: 13-15. század Budapest: Osiris Kiadó, 1999. 371 p. (Doktori mestermunkák) (ISBN 963 379 558 3)
- Csernus, Sándor: "Les Hongrie, les Français et les premières croisades" In: Sándor Csernus, Klára Korompay (szerk.) Egyéb szerzőség: Mária Tandori, Katalin Csősz-Jutteau (bibliogr.); Les Hongrois et l'Europe: Conquête et intégration. 499 p. Konferencia helye, ideje: Paris, Franciaország, 1997.06.16-1997.06.17. Paris; Szeged: Institut Hongrois de Paris; JATE, 1999. pp. 411–426. (Publications de l'Institut hongrois de Paris) (ISBN 9634823947)
- Csernus, Sándor: "A Párizsi Magyar Intézet : 70 év után végre Collegium Hungaricum?: A harmadik évezred magyar intézménye Párizsban" HUNGAROLÓGIA 1:(1-2) pp. 24–33. (1999)
- Csernus, Sándor: "Szeged felszabadulása (1686): Részlet Lotharingiai Károly hadinaplójából" In: Géczi L, Farkas Cs (szerk.) Helytörténeti szövegyűjtemény. Szeged: Csongrád Megyei Levéltár, 1999. p. 50.
- Csernus, Sándor: "A magyar Anjouk a korabeli francia nyelvű történetírásban" In: Klaniczay G, Nagy Balázs (szerk.): A középkor szeretete: Történeti tanulmányok Sz. Jónás Ilona születésnapjára. 545 p. Budapest: ELTE Bölcsészettudományi Kar, 1999. pp. 425–436. (ISBN 963-463-348-X)
- Juvénel des Ursins Jean, Csernus Sándor (ford): "Zsigmond császár franciaországi látogatása" In: Sz. Jónás I (szerk.): Középkori egyetemes történeti szöveggyűjtemény: Európa és a Közel-Kelet IV-XV. század. 579 p. Budapest: Osiris Kiadó, 1999. pp. 565–566. (ISBN 963-379-549-4)
- Csernus, Sándor, Klára Korompay (szerk.) Egyéb szerzőség: Mária Tandori, Katalin Csősz-Jutteau (bibliogr.); "Les Hongrois et l'Europe: Conquête et intégration" Konferencia helye, ideje: Paris, Franciaország, 1997.06.16-1997.06.17. Paris; Szeged: Institut Hongrois de Paris; JATE, 1999. 499 p. (Publications de l'Institut hongrois de Paris) (ISBN 9634823947)
- Csernus, Sándor (szerk.): Publications de l’Institut Hongrois de Paris Series: Littérature, Documenta Hungarorum in Gallia, Dissertationes, Études, 1999-2007 (1999)

=== 2000 ===
- Csernus, S, Tonnerre N-Y: Préface In: Kristó GY Histoire de la Hongrie médievale. I. Le temps des Arpads. 224 p. Rennes: Presses Universitaires de Rennes, 2000. pp. 7–12. (ISBN 9782868475336)
- Csernus, Sándor: "La Hongrie et les Hongrois dans la littérature chevaleresque française" In: Coulet N (szerk.): La noblesse dans les territoires angevins à la fin du Moyen Age: actes du colloque international : Angers-Saumur, 3-4 juin 1998. 845 p. Konferencia helye, ideje:, Franciaország, 1998.06.03-1998.06.06. Róma: École Francaise de Rome, 2000. pp. 717–735. (Collection de l'École Francaise de Rome; 275.) (ISBN 2-7283-0615-X)
- Csernus, Sándor: "Hungarológia: esély a belső és külső expanzióra" HUNGAROLÓGIA 2:(3) pp. 138–150. (2000)
- Csernus, Sándor: "Franciaország" In: Kristó Gyula, Makk Ferenc (szerk.): Európa és Magyarország Szent István korában. 403 p. Szeged: Csongrád megye Önkormányzata, 2000. pp. 101–123. (Dél-alföldi évszázadok; 12.) (ISBN 963-7193-29-4)

=== 2001 ===
- Csernus, Sándor: "La Hongrie des Anjou: Le bilan d’une grande puissance médiévale" In: Guy Le Goff, Francesco Aceto (szerk.): L'Europe des Anjou: Aventure des princes angevins du XIIIe au XVe siécle. Paris: Somogy éditions d'art, 2001. pp. 154–168 (ISBN 2-85056-465-6)
- Csernus, Sándor: "Kálmán Benda et l’avenir fondé sur le passé" In: Péter Sahin-Tóth (szerk.): Rencontres intellectuelles franco-hongroises: regards croisés sur l'histoire et la littérature : actes des tables rondes franco-hongroises (1997 - 1998) organisées par le Service culturel, scientifique et de coopération de l'Ambassade de France en Hongrie, l'Institut Français en Hongrie et le Collegium Budapest. Budapest: Collegium Budapest Institute for Advanced Study, 2001. pp. 139–152. (Workshop series / Collegium Budapest; 10.) (ISBN 963-8463-70-8)

=== 2002 ===
- Csernus, Sándor: "Nouvelles publications de l’Institut Hongrois" In: Toulouze Henri, Hanus Erzsébet La bibliographie de la Hongrie en langue francaise. 517 p. Paris; Budapest: Párizsi Magyar Intézet; Országos Széchényi Könyvtár, 2002. p. 5. (Documenta Hungarorum in Gallia; 1.) (ISBN 963 200 444 2)
- Csernus, Sándor: "La Hongrie, rempart de la Chrétienté: Naissance et épanouissement de l’idée d’une mission collective" In: Delsol C, Masłowski M, Nowicki J (szerk.) Mythes et symboles politiques en Europe centrale. Paris: Presses Universitaires de France (PUF), 2002. pp. 107–123. (Politique d'aujourd'hui) (ISBN 2-13-050050-1)

=== 2003 ===
- Csernus, Sándor: "A Magyar Könyv Franciaországban" In: Bernáth Árpád, Bombitz Attila (szerk.): Magyar irodalmi jelenlét idegen kontextusban. Szeged: Grimm Könyvkiadó, 2003. pp. 203–215. (ISBN 963 9087 77 7)

=== 2004 ===
- Csernus, S, Poly J-P: Préface In: Kálnoky N. Les constitutions et priviléges de la noble nation sicule: Acculturation et maintien d'un systéme coutumier dans la Transylvanie médiévale. Budapest; Paris; Szeged: Institut Hongrois de Paris; Société pour l'Encyclopédie de l' Histoire de l' Église en Hongrie, 2004. pp. 9–14. (Publications de l'Institut Hongrois de Paris. Dissertationes; 2.) (ISBN 963 212 0299)
- Csernus, Sándor: "Évolution spécifique de la culture hongroise et ses relations avec l’espace francophone" TRANSITIONS & SOCIÉTÉS 6: pp. 91–101. (2004)

=== 2005 ===
- Csernus, Sándor: "Átmeneti fellendülés, vagy esély az áttörésre? A magyar kultúra pozíciói és a magyar irodalom Franciaországban": [On the changing Hungarian-French cultural relations] MIKES INTERNATIONAL - HUNGARIAN PERIODICAL FOR ART LITERATURE AND SCIENCE 5:(3) pp. 25–32. (2005)
- Csernus, Sándor: "La Hongrie et l’Europe: L’apport culturel des nouveaux États membres de l’Union Européenne et spécialement celui de la Hongrie" In: Marès A (szerk.) La culture et l'Europe. Du rêve européen aux réalités: Actes du colloque international, Fondation Singer-Polignac, 31 mars 2005. 191 p. Konferencia helye, ideje: Paris, Franciaország, 2005.03.31 Paris: Institut d'études slaves (IES), 2005. pp. 27–55. (Travaux publiés par l'Institut d'études slaves; 48.) (ISBN 2-7024-0418-9)
- Csernus, Sándor: "Átmeneti fellenülés vagy esély az áttörésre ?: A magyar kultúra pozíciói és a magyar irodalom Franciaországban" In: Hírünk a világban: Hollandiai Mikes Kelemen Kör, Mikes International 45. Tanulmányi Napok. Konferencia helye, ideje: Elspeet, Hollandia, 2004.09.09-2004.09.12. Hága: Stichting Mikes International, pp. 1–16.
- Csernus, Sándor: "A magyar kortárs képzőművészet és iparművészet bemutatása a Párizsi Magyar Intézetben" In: Simonffy Márta (szerk.): Helyzet - nemzetközi konferencia: A magyar művészet helyzete az európai csatlakozás idején. 263 p. Konferencia helye, ideje: Budapest, Magyarország, 2005.05.30-2005.05.31. Budapest: Magyar Képzőművészek és Iparművészek Szövetsége, 2005. pp. 203–212. (ISBN 963 218 782 2)
- Csernus, Sándor: Les Anjou dans les livres scolaires hongrois des 19e et 20e siècles AKADEMOS 5:(sp.) p. &. (2005)
- Csernus, Sándor (szakértő): Kapcsoskönyv 1-12 rész: Fejezetek a magyar-francia kapcsolatok történetéből; Dokumentum sorozat Prod. Római Róbert; rendező: Szakály István; Vikol Katalin; operatőr: Stenszky Gyula, MTV; fejezetenként 40’ perc, Video + DVD, 1993-2005 (2005)

=== 2006 ===
- Csernus, Sándor: "Luxemburgi Zsigmond emléke a francia forrásokban" In: Takács Imre (szerk.): Sigismundus rex et imperator : művészet és kultúra Luxemburgi Zsigmond korában, 1387-1437: kiállítási katalógus : Budapest, Szépművészeti Múzeum, 2006. március 18 - június 18., Luxemburg, Musée national d'histoire et d'art, 2006. július 13 - október 15. 733 p. Mainz: Philipp von Zabern, 2006. pp. 487–494. (ISBN 3-8053-3641-1)
- Csernus, Sándor: "Le souvenir de Sigismond dans les sources francaises" In: Takács Imre (szerk.) Sigismundus rex et imperator : művészet és kultúra Luxemburgi Zsigmond korában, 1387-1437: kiállítási katalógus : Budapest, Szépművészeti Múzeum, 2006. március 18 - június 18., Luxemburg, Musée national d'histoire et d'art, 2006. július 13 - október 15. 733 p. Mainz: Philipp von Zabern, 2006. p. &. (ISBN 3-8053-3641-1)
- Csernus, Sándor: "Sigismundus von Luxemburg und die franzözische Geschichtssreibung" In: Takács Imre (szerk.): Sigismundus rex et imperator : művészet és kultúra Luxemburgi Zsigmond korában, 1387-1437: kiállítási katalógus : Budapest, Szépművészeti Múzeum, 2006. március 18 - június 18., Luxemburg, Musée national d'histoire et d'art, 2006. július 13 - október 15. 733 p. Mainz: Philipp von Zabern, 2006. p. &. (ISBN 3-8053-3641-1)
- Csernus, Sándor: "Magyarságtudomány és nemzetközi kapcsolatok" In: Vendégtanári és Lektori konferencia. Konferencia helye, ideje: Budapest, Magyarország, 2006.08.28 Budapest: Balassi Bálint Magyar Kulturális Intézet, p. 14.

=== 2007 ===
- Csernus, S, Poly J-P: Előszó In: Kálnoky Natália, Csernus Sándor (szerk.): A nemes székely nemzet konstitúciói és privilégiumai: Egy szokásrendszer meggyökerezése és fennmaradása a középkori Erdélyben. 207 p. Csíkszereda: Pallas-Akadémia Könyvkiadó, 2007. pp. 9–13. (ISBN 978 973 665 198 4)
- Csernus, Sándor: "A Balassi Intézet és az ország-kép: A kultúra felértékelődése a nemzetközi kapcsolatokban" In: Külföldi magyar kulturális intézetek igazgatóinak találkozója. Konferencia helye, ideje: Budapest, Magyarország, 2007.07.03-2007.07.04. Balassi Bálint Magyar Kulturális Intézet; OM, p. 12.
- Kálnoky, Natália & Csernus, Sándor (szerk.): A nemes székely nemzet konstitúciói és privilégiumai: Egy szokásrendszer meggyökerezése és fennmaradása a középkori Erdélyben Csíkszereda: Pallas-Akadémia Könyvkiadó, 2007. 207 p. (ISBN 978 973 665 198 4)

=== 2008 ===
- Csernus, Sándor: "1456: La victoire de Nándorfehérvár et son influence sur le développement de la conscience nationale des Hongrois" In: Judit Maár, Patrick Renaud (szerk.): Temps, Espaces, Langages - la Hongrie a la croisée des disciplines.: Actes du colloque des 7-8-9 décembre 2006. Cahiers d'Études Hongroises n/14. Konferencia helye, ideje: Paris, Franciaország, 2006.12.07-2006.12.09. Paris: L'Harmattan Kiadó, 2008. p.
- Csernus, Sándor: "Lancelot király a Kereszténység „pajzsa” és „védfala”: A kortárs francia történetírás V. László portréjához" In: Berta T, Csikós Zs, Fischer F, Szilágyi Á, Szilágyi I (szerk.) Az identitás régi és új koordinátái: Tanulmányok Anderle Ádám 65. születésnapjára. 322 p. Szeged; Budapest: Palatinus Kiadó, 2008. pp. 161–173. (ISBN 978-963-274-031-7)

=== 2009 ===
- Csernus, Sándor: Hungarologie. "Les études hongroises dans le monde: Principes, structures, objectifs et perspectives" In: Szende T (szerk.): Politiques linguistiques, apprentissage des langues et francophonie en Europe centrale et orientale: Les défis de la diversité. Paris: Éditions des archives contemporaines, 2009. p. &. (ISBN 978-2-8130-0003-3)
- Csernus, Sándor: "La Hongrie de Mathias Corvin: Ruptures et continuité dans l’histoire hongroise du 15e siècle" In: Jean-François Maillard, István Monok, Donatella Nebbiai (szerk.): Matthias Corvin, les bibliothèques princières et la genèse de l’état moderne. 340 p. Konferencia helye, ideje: Párizs, Franciaország, 2007.11.15-2007.11.17. Budapest: Országos Széchényi Könyvtár (OSZK), 2009. pp. 13–24. (Supplementum Corvinianum; 2.) (ISBN 978 963 200 567 6)
- Csernus, Sándor: "In memoriam Radnóti Miklós" In: Olasz Sándor, Zelena András (szerk.): “Mert annyit érek én, amennyit ér a szó”: Szegedi Radnóti-konferenciák. 232 p. Szeged: SZTE BTK, 2009. pp. 4–9. (ISBN 978-963-482-988-1)

=== 2010 ===
- Csernus, S, Tonnerre N-Y: Préface In: Bérenger J La Hongrie des Habsbourg: De 1526 à 1790. 401 p. Rennes: Presses Universitaires de Rennes, 2010. pp. I-V. (Histoire (Rennes)) Tom.1.. (ISBN 978-2-7535-0987-0)
- Csernus, Sándor, Forgács Tamás: "Új típusú egységes tanárképzés vagy a bolognai tanári mesterképzés korrekciós modellje? Hogyan tovább a tanárképzésben?: Helyzetelemzési kísérlet és megvalósítási javaslatok" PEDAGÓGUSKÉPZÉS: PEDAGÓGUSKÉPZŐK ÉS -TOVÁBBKÉPZŐK FOLYÓIRATA 8:(1) pp. 109–115. (2010)
- Csernus, Sándor: "Une idéologie à l’épreuve de la modernité: L’idée de la croisade en Hongrie au tournant des XVe-XVIe siècles" In: de Cevins Marie-Madeleine (szerk.): L’Europe centrale au seuil de la modérnité: Mutations sociales, religieuses et culturelles. Autriche, Bohême, Hongrie et Pologne, fin du XVe–milieu du XVIe siècle. Konferencia helye, ideje: Fontevraud, Franciaország, 2009.05.15-2009.05.16. Rennes: Presses Universitaires de Rennes, 2010. pp. 57–74. (ISBN 978-2-7535-1226-9)

=== 2011 ===
- Csernus, Sándor: "Mítosz, propaganda és népi etimológia: Hunyadi János: 'Fehér' vagy 'Vlach' lovag?" ACTA HISTORICA (SZEGED) 128: pp. 3–33. (2011).

=== 2013 ===
- Csernus, Sándor: "Jehan de Wavrin krónikája: angol történelem, francia történetírás és keresztes hadjárat: Burgundiak az Al-Dunán (1444-1445)" In: Györkös Attila, Kiss Gergely (szerk.): Francia-magyar kapcsolatok a középkorban. 350 p. Debrecen: Debreceni Egyetemi Kiadó, 2013. p. 127. (Speculum Historiae Debreceniense; 13.) (ISBN 978-963-318-358-8)
- Csernus, Sándor: "A kelet vonzásában: Konstantinápoly meghódítása és a francia nyelvű történetírás születése" In: Robert de Clari Egyéb szerzőség: Csernus Sándor, Cs Tóth Annamária (ford.); Konstantinápoly hódoltatása. 264 p. Budapest: Balassi Kiadó, 2013. pp. 177–194. (A középkori francia történeti irodalom remekei; 1.) (ISBN 978-963-506-911-8)
- Csernus, Sándor: "Kronológia Robert de Clari krónikájának tanulmányozásához" In: Robert de Clari Egyéb szerzőség: Csernus Sándor, Cs Tóth Annamária (ford.); Konstantinápoly hódoltatása. 264 p. Budapest: Balassi Kiadó, 2013. pp. 195–202. (A középkori francia történeti irodalom remekei; 1.) (ISBN 978-963-506-911-8)
- Csernus, Sándor: "Dinasztiák és uralkodók 1100-1300" In: Robert de Clari Egyéb szerzőség: Csernus Sándor, Cs Tóth Annamária (ford.); Konstantinápoly hódoltatása. 264 p. Budapest: Balassi Kiadó, 2013. pp. 203–218. (A középkori francia történeti irodalom remekei; 1.) (ISBN 978-963-506-911-8)
- Csernus, Sándor: Válogatott bibliográfia In: Robert de Clari Egyéb szerzőség: Csernus Sándor, Cs Tóth Annamária (ford.); Konstantinápoly hódoltatása. 264 p. Budapest: Balassi Kiadó, 2013. pp. 219–226. (A középkori francia történeti irodalom remekei; 1.) (ISBN 978-963-506-911-8)
- Robert de Clari: Egyéb szerzőség: Csernus Sándor, Cs Tóth Annamária (ford.); Konstantinápoly hódoltatása Budapest: Balassi Kiadó, 2013. 264 p. (A középkori francia történeti irodalom remekei; 1.) (ISBN 978-963-506-911-8)
- Cs. Tóth Annamária, Csernus Sándor: Előszó a magyar kiadáshoz In: Robert de Clari Egyéb szerzőség: Csernus Sándor, Cs. Tóth Annamária (ford.); Konstantinápoly hódoltatása. 264 p. Budapest: Balassi Kiadó, 2013. pp. 9–13. (A középkori francia történeti irodalom remekei; 1.) (ISBN 978-963-506-911-8)

=== 2015 ===
- Csernus, Sándor: Egyéb szerzőség: Szász Géza (ford.); "Tibor Wittman, rappel d’une vie riche et douloureusement courte" ÖT KONTINENS: AZ ÚJ- ÉS JELENKORI EGYETEMES TÖRTÉNETI TANSZÉK TUDOMÁNYOS KÖZLEMÉNYEI 2013:(2) pp. 21–27. (2015)
- Csernus, Sándor: "Tipikus és kivételes: A Joinville-ek: egy champagne-i bárói család kiemelkedése" In: Jean de Joinville Egyéb szerzőség: Csernus Sándor, Cs Tóth Annamária (ford.); Csernus Sándor (forrás kiad.); Szent Lajos élete és bölcs mondásai. 434 p. Budapest: Balassi Kiadó, 2015. pp. 275–303. (A középkori francia történeti irodalom remekei; 2.) (ISBN 978-963-506-963-7)
- Csernus, Sándor: "A 'super homo' és Joinville Szent Lajosa" In: Jean de Joinville Egyéb szerzőség: Csernus Sándor, Cs Tóth Annamária (ford.); Csernus Sándor (forrás kiad.); Szent Lajos élete és bölcs mondásai. 434 p. Budapest: Balassi Kiadó, 2015. pp. 304–331. (A középkori francia történeti irodalom remekei; 2.) (ISBN 978-963-506-963-7)
- Csernus, Sándor: "Kronológia Joinville művének tanulmányozásához" In: Jean de Joinville Egyéb szerzőség: Csernus Sándor, Cs Tóth Annamária (ford.); Csernus Sándor (forrás kiad.); Szent Lajos élete és bölcs mondásai. 434 p. Budapest: Balassi Kiadó, 2015. pp. 353–360. (A középkori francia történeti irodalom remekei; 2.) (ISBN 978-963-506-963-7)
- Csernus, Sándor: "Országok, dinasztiák és uralkodók" In: Jean de Joinville Egyéb szerzőség: Csernus Sándor, Cs Tóth Annamária (ford.); Csernus Sándor (forrás kiad.); Szent Lajos élete és bölcs mondásai. 434 p. Budapest: Balassi Kiadó, 2015. pp. 361–386. (A középkori francia történeti irodalom remekei; 2.) (ISBN 978-963-506-963-7)
- Csernus, Sándor: "A keresztes háborúk résztvevõi: Bárók és lovagrendek" In: Jean de Joinville Egyéb szerzőség: Csernus Sándor, Cs Tóth Annamária (ford.); Csernus Sándor (forrás kiad.); Szent Lajos élete és bölcs mondásai. 434 p. Budapest: Balassi Kiadó, 2015. pp. 387–395. (A középkori francia történeti irodalom remekei; 2.) (ISBN 978-963-506-963-7)
- Csernus, Sándor: Válogatott bibliográfia In: Jean de Joinville Egyéb szerzőség: Csernus Sándor, Cs Tóth Annamária (ford.); Csernus Sándor (forrás kiad.); Szent Lajos élete és bölcs mondásai. 434 p. Budapest: Balassi Kiadó, 2015. pp. 396–409. (A középkori francia történeti irodalom remekei; 2.) (ISBN 978-963-506-963-7)
- Csernus, Sándor: "Francia hadifoglyok hétköznapjai Magyarországon: 1940-1945" In: Gyarmati György, Pihurik Judit (szerk.): Háborús hétköznapok hadszíntéren, hátországban 1939-1945. 328 p. Konferencia helye, ideje: Szeged, Magyarország, 2013.10.03-2013.10.04. Budapest; Pécs: Kronosz Kiadó; Magyar Történelmi Társulat; Állambiztonsági Szolgálatok Történeti Levéltára, 2015. pp. 121–141. (ISBN 9786155497520)
- Jacques Le Goff Egyéb szerzőség: Csernus Sándor (ford.): "Szent Lajos: Következtetések" In: Jean de Joinville Egyéb szerzőség: Csernus Sándor, Cs Tóth Annamária (ford.); Csernus Sándor (forrás kiad.); Szent Lajos élete és bölcs mondásai. 434 p. Budapest: Balassi Kiadó, 2015. pp. 265–274. (A középkori francia történeti irodalom remekei; 2.) (ISBN 978-963-506-963-7)
- Jean de Joinville Egyéb szerzőség: Csernus Sándor, Cs Tóth Annamária (ford.); Csernus Sándor (forráskiad.); Szent Lajos élete és bölcs mondásai, Budapest: Balassi Kiadó, 2015. 434 p. (A középkori francia történeti irodalom remekei; 2.) (ISBN 978-963-506-963-7)

=== 2016 ===
- Csernus, Sándor: "From the Arsenal of Sigismund’s Diplomacy: Universalism versus Sovereignty" In: Bárány Attila Pál (szerk.) Egyéb szerzőség: Bacsa Balázs Antal (sajtó alá rend.); Das Konzil von Konstanz und Ungarn. 275 p. Konferencia helye, ideje: Debrecen, Magyarország, 2014.11.05-2014.11.07. Debrecen: MTA, 2016. pp. 9–32. (Memoria Hungariae; 1.) (ISBN 9789635088324)
- Csernus, Sándor: "V. László franciaországi követségének forrásaihoz: Tours, 1457". december In: Tóth Ferenc, Zágorhidi Czigány Balázs (szerk.) Via Sancti Martini: Szent Márton útjai térben és időben. 375 p. Budapest: MTA BTK Történettudományi Intézet, 2016. pp. 165–190. (ISBN 9789634160472)
- Csernus, Sándor: "Myth, Propaganda and Popular Etymology: János Hunyadi – 'White' or 'Vlach' Knight?" CHRONICA: ANNUAL OF THE INSTITUTE OF HISTORY UNIVERSITY OF SZEGED 12: pp. 125–147. (2016)
- Csernus, Sándor: "Jean de Joinville történetének kéziratai, első kiadásai és a könyvnyomtatók felelőssége" In: Nyerges Judit, Verók Attila, Zvara Edina (szerk.): MONOKgraphia: Tanulmányok Monok István 60. születésnapjára. 847 p. Budapest: Kossuth Kiadó, 2016. pp. 132–137. (ISBN 978-963-09-8702-8)

== Bibliogryphy ==
- Gálffy, László; Sáringer, János, eds. (2015). Fehér Lovag: tanulmányok Csernus Sándor 65. születésnapjára (White Knight: Papers On Sándor Csernus's 65th Birthday (PDF) (in Hungarian). Szeged: Lazi Könyvkiadó; SZTE BTK Középkori Egyetemes Történeti Tanszék. ISBN 978 963 267 270 0
- "Sándor Csernus's publications" (in Hungarian). MTMT.
