= Hungarian Historical Society =

Historical society of Hungary established in 1867

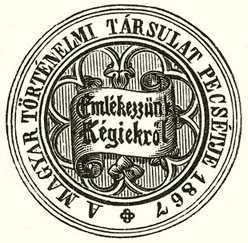
- The seal and the motto of the Hungarian Historical Society
- Formation: 15 May 1867; 159 years ago
- Type: Historical society, GO, NGO, IGO
- Headquarters: 1097 Tóth Kálmán str. 4. B building 512, 9th District of Budapest, Hungary
- Coordinates: 47.4736°N 19.0727°E4
- Region served: Hungary
- Official language: Hungarian
- President: Róbert Hermann D.Sc
- Website: English version

The Hungarian Historical Society (Hungarian: Magyar Történelmi Társulat [ˈmɒɟɒr ˈtørteːnɛlmi ˈtaːrʃulɒt]) is a learned society in Hungary, established in 1867. Its main responsibilities are the cultivation of the History of Hungary, dissemination of scientific findings, supporting research and development and representing the history of Hungary domestically and around the world.

== Aims ==
The historical society's aims are:

- Cultivating and promoting Hungarian historiography and history, organizing archival research and publishing national historical sources according to the unpolitical spirituality.
- Spreading the recent study results of the Hungarian and – as far as possible – Universal History to reach the widest audience.
- Its traditional aims are to become a large, informal "guild" to defend and represent the interests of the Hungarian historians, the educators of the history of Hungary and those people who are interested in history.

== Motto ==
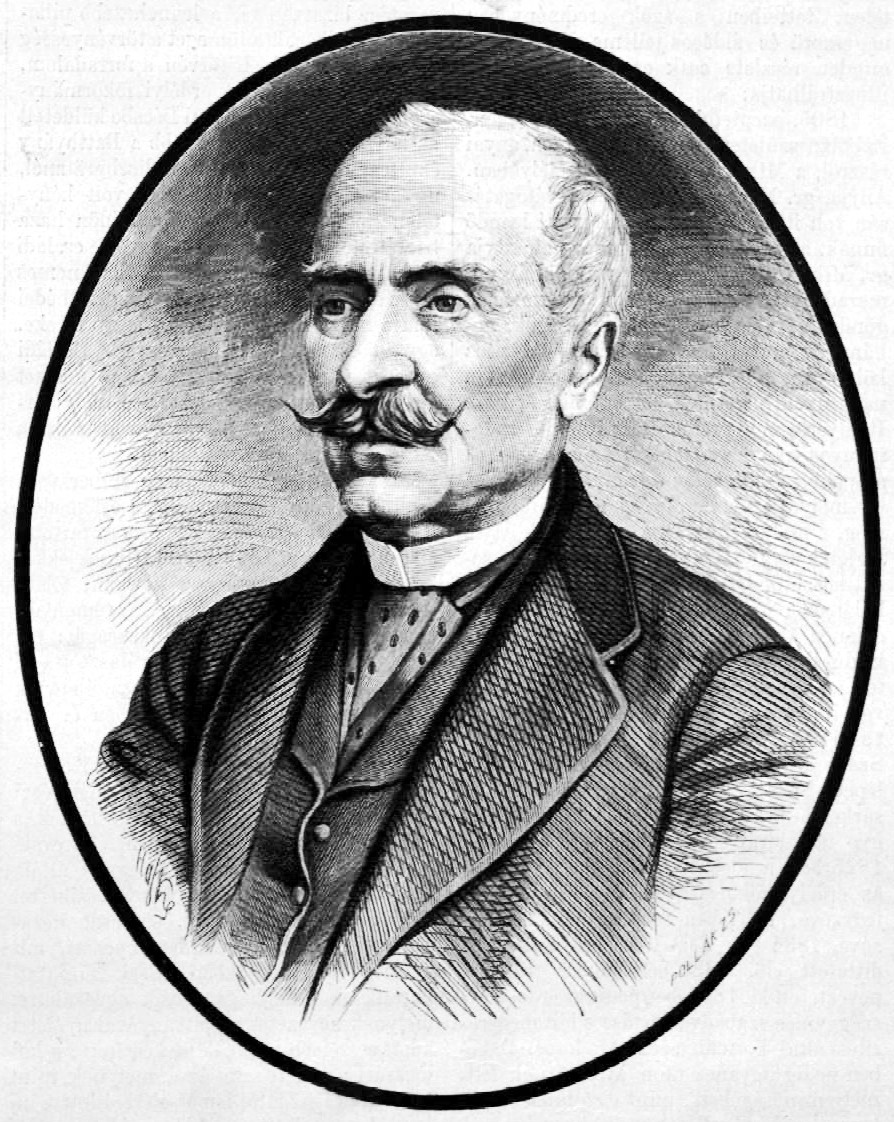
The portrait of Count Imre Mikó, engraving of Zsigmond Pollák, 1876

"Emlékezzünk régiekről!″ (Remember the Old Ones)

== History ==
The Hungarian Historical Society was established on May 15, 1867. The first session to establish the society was held on 2 February 1867 which was summoned by Arnold Ipolyi. Here they discussed the ways in which the society was formed and chose a committee to elaborate the basic rules. The first General Assembly was held with 300 members at the Hungarian Academy of Sciences. On 13 June Imre Mikó was elected to the chairman of the society, and acted as a leader until 1876.

== 21st century ==
The goal of the new millennium was that the society renewed the old traditions of conferences and congresses related to the various significant anniversaries, and it began monthly talk series about "Critical Issues in the national history" and the modernization of Periodical Századok. The society celebrated its 150th anniversary on May 15, 2017, and on this occasion a memorial conference was held at the Hungarian Academy of Sciences on 6 December 2017.

== Organisation ==
The management and the Board of Directors is run by the General Assembly. The 20 members of the Board of Directors are elected by the ordinary Annual General Assembly meeting among regular members by secret ballot. The management is consisting of nine members: the chairperson, the five deputy chairpersons among whom one serves as an acting chairperson, the general secretary, the chairman of the Editorial Board of Periodical Századok and its editor-in-chief.

== Committees ==
- Regional committees: Borsod-Abaúj-Zemplén County Committee, Southern Great Plain Committee, Southern Transdanubia Committee, Hajdú-Bihar County Committee, Heves County Committee, Eastern Transdanubia Committee, Western Transdanubia Committee, Szabolcs-Szatmár-Bereg County Committee.
- Specialized sections: Information history Section, Doctorandus Section, László Vekerdy Section.
- Professional committees (sections): Church history Section, Environmental history Section, Women's history Section, Teacher's Section.

== Leadership ==
=== Chairpersons ===
Imre Mikó	1867 – 1876
Mihály Horváth	1877 – 1878
Arnold Ipolyi	1878 – 1886
Gábor Kemény	1887 – 1888
Antal Szécsen	1888 – 1894
Géza Teleki	1894 – 1913
Lajos Thallóczy	1913 – 1916
Kuno von Klebelsberg	1917 – 1932
Bálint Hóman	1933 – 1944
Ferenc Eckhart	1946 – 1949
Erzsébet Andics	1949 – 1958
Erik Molnár	1958 – 1966
Győző Ember	1967 – 1975
Iván T. Berend	1975 – 1982
László Makkai	1982 – 1985
Sándor Balogh	1986 – 1990
István Diószegi	1991 – 1999
Domokos Kosáry	1999 – 2007
István Orosz	2007 – 2015
Róbert Hermann	2015 – present

=== Current management ===
Róbert Hermann	Chairman
Enikő Csukovits	General Secretary
Attila Pók	Acting (deputy) chairman
Enikő A. Sajti	Deputy chairwoman
Magdolna Baráth	Deputy chairwoman
László Csorba	Deputy chairman
László Szarka	Deputy chairman
Csaba Fazekas	Deputy General Secretary
Tibor Frank	Chairman of the Editorial Board of Periodical Századok

== Types of the Publications of the Society ==
The society published several journals, periodicals and books from its establishment, 1867, e.g monographs, book series, sourcebooks, study books, biographies, mémoires, e.g. about significant Hungarian historical persons like Ladislaus IV of Hungary, Louis I of Hungary, Mary, Queen of Hungary, Matthias Corvinus, Tamás Bakócz, Sigismund Rákóczi, Péter Pázmány, Gabriel Bethlen, Miklós Zrínyi, George II Rákóczi, Emeric Thököly. In 1867 it established its most important periodical named Századok (Centuries) which has survived until now.

== Bibliography ==
- Cservenka, Judit. ""Emlékezzünk régiekről!" – 150 éves a Magyar Történelmi Társulat (Celebrating the 150th anniversary of Hungarican Historical Society). Published on December 8, 2017" (in Hungarian). Felvidék ma. Archived from the original on March 23, 2018.
- Nagy, László (2009). "A Magyar Történelmi Társulat történetének forrásai (Sources of History of the HHS)" (PDF). Magyar Tudomány (in Hungarian). 170 (2): 160–168.
