= Enikő Bollobás =

Hungarian literary scholar (born 1952)

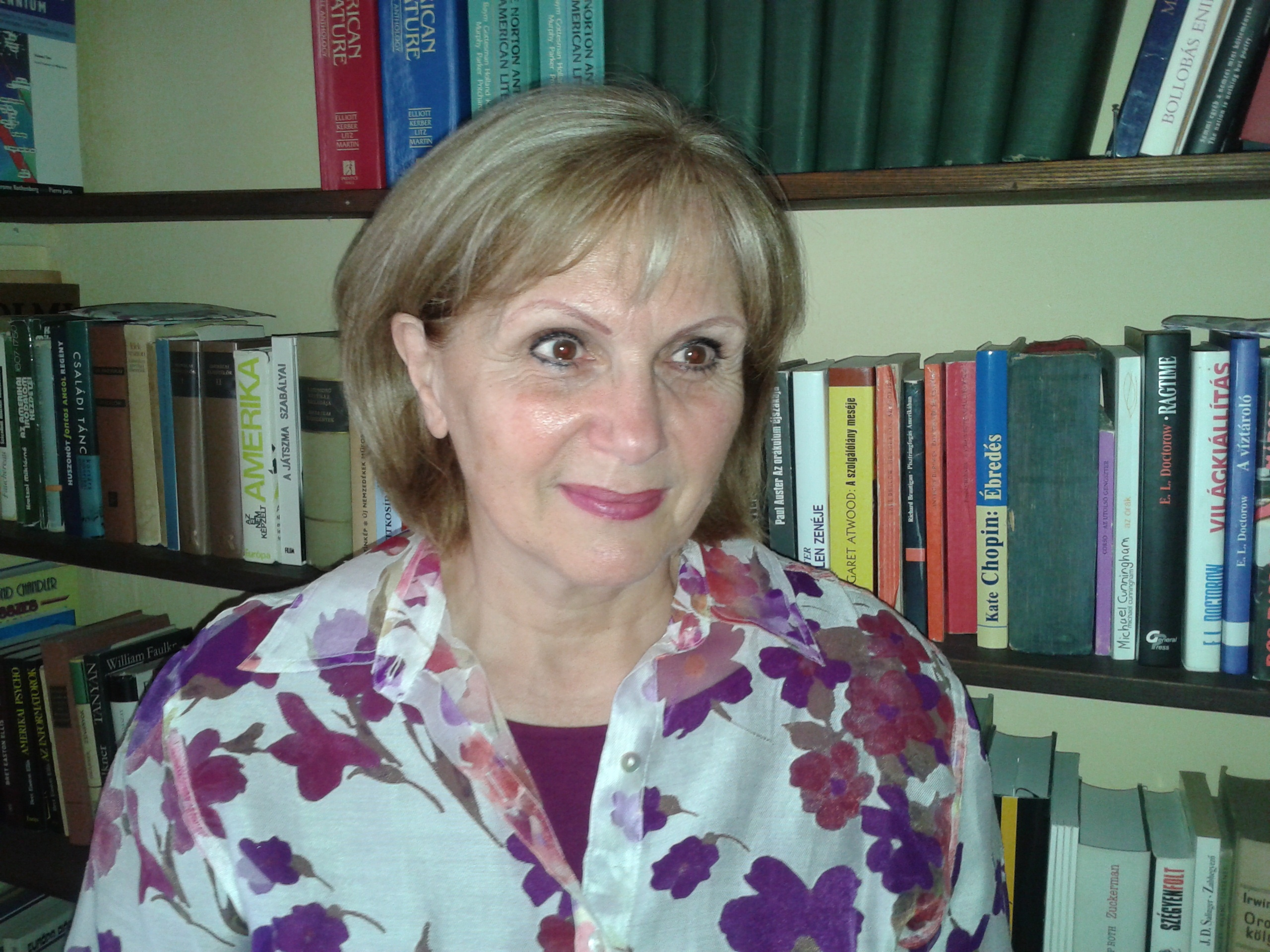
- Born: 19 June 1952 (age 74); Budapest, Hungary
- Education: Eötvös Loránd University
- Awards: Order of Merit of the Republic of Hungary

Enikő Bollobás (born 19 June 1952) is a Hungarian literary scholar, professor emeritus at the School of English and American Studies of Eötvös Loránd University, Budapest. She is a full member of the Hungarian Academy of Sciences, and editor-in-chief of Magyar Tudomány ('Hungarian Science'), the monthly journal of the Hungarian Academy of Sciences.

== Life and work ==
Bollobás has written eleven books on literature as well as numerous cultural and critical studies. A graduate of ELTE (Eötvös Loránd University), she has been affiliated with this school (as associate professor, later professor) since 1990, when she co-founded the Department of American Studies with two colleagues, Zoltán Kövecses and Gyula Kodolányi.

On several occasions she was visiting professor and visiting scholar in the U.S (University of Oregon, Eugene; University of Iowa; University of California, San Diego). She has been invited to speak at various universities, including Cambridge University (England), Yale, Berkeley, Stanford, Georgetown, and George Washington University.

Her research and publication fields include American literature and culture, Hungarian literature, women's studies/gender studies, Jewish studies, social issues.

== Political activities ==
During the 1980s, Bollobás was active in the political opposition. For her participation in human and minority rights movements in Transylvania, Romanian authorities permanently expelled her from Ceauşescu's Romania in 1982; this step was instantly backed by the Hungarian authorities, who withdrew even her “red passport” (valid to Warsaw Pact countries). As part of her commitment to human rights, in 1989 she founded the Szeged-based political discussion group Hungarian Feminists, the first non-communist organization to address women's issues.

== Public service ==
After the regime change Bollobás worked in government administration: as deputy chief of mission and chargé d'affaires at the Hungarian Embassy in Washington, D.C., and as director of the Department of Atlantic, Northern European, and Israeli Affairs of the Hungarian Foreign Ministry in Budapest. She served as vice chair and secretary general (1992–1996) of the Hungarian Atlantic Council, lobbying at the time for Hungary's NATO membership.

== Honors and awards ==
- HUSSE Best Book Award (for The History of American Literature), 2008
- Országh László-díj ('László Országh Prize'), 2010
- Magyar Érdemrend tisztikeresztje ("Officer’s Cross of the Order of Merit"), 2013
- Szent-Györgyi Albert-díj ('Albert Szent-Györgyi Prize'), 2013
- Irodalmi Jelen esszédíj ('Irodalmi Jelen Essay Prize'), 2016
- Kaffka Margit-díj ('Margit Kaffka Prize'), 2025
- Fulbright Hungary Medal, 2026

== Selected publications ==
=== Books ===
Her professional interests range from theories of modernism and postmodernism, American modern and postmodern literatures, the traditions of experimentation and avant-garde, and free verse prosodies to post-deconstruction theories, feminist theory and criticism, American studies theories. She has published eleven books on American and Hungarian literature:

- Létörömök költészete – Szőcs Géza verseiről [The joys of being – on the poetry Géza Szőcs]. Budapest: Balassi Kiadó, 2025.
- Ami szép, az nehéz – A nem alanyi költészetről [χαλεπὰ τὰ καλά – The beautiful things are difficult. On non-lyric poetries]. Budapest: Akadémiai Kiadó, 2021.
- Reading through Theory – Studies in Theory-framed Interpretation of the Literary Text. Budapest: Eötvös Kiadó, 2021.
- Kölcsönösségek. Irodalomelmélet, szövegolvasás, kultúraközvetítés [Reciprocoties – Literary theory, reading, cultural mediation]. Budapest: Balassi, 2020.
- Az amerikai irodalom rövid története [A concise history of American literature] (Budapest: Osiris, 2015)
- Vendégünk a végtelenből – Emily Dickinson költészete [Our visitor from infinitude—Emily Dickinson’s poetry] (Budapest: Balassi, 2015) * see also
- Egy képlet nyomában – Karakterelemzések az amerikai és a magyar irodalomból [In Search of a Formula—Analyzing American and Hungarian Literary Characters] (Budapest: Balassi, 2012)
- They Aren't, Until I Call Them — On Doing Things with Words in Literature (Frankfurt am Main-Berlin-Bern-Bruxelles-New York-Oxford: Peter Lang, 2010)
- Az amerikai irodalom története [A History of American Literature] (Budapest: Osiris, 2005)
- Charles Olson (New York: Twayne, 1992)
- Tradition and Innovation in American Free Verse (Budapest: Akadémiai Kiadó, 1986).

=== Articles ===
==== American literature and culture ====
- “The Pumping of the Real” – On Charles Olson’s Breath Turn.” In: Zoltán Kulcsár-Szabó, Csongor Lőrincz, Gábor Mezei, Gábor Tamás Molnár, Attila Simon (eds.), Allegories of Breathing – Intersections of Language and Life in Literature. Stuttgart: Franz Steiner Verlag, 2026. 119-141.
- „A valós pumpálása” – Charles Olson lélegzés-fordulatáról” [The pumping of the real” – on Charles Olson’s breath turn]. Alföld 2025/4. 75-87.
- “Self and Form: The Radicalization of American Poetry from Emily Dickinson to Charles Bernstein.” Hungarian Journal of English and American Studies 30.2 (2024): 449-480
- „Énmegvonás és nyelvbe zártság. Az amerikai költészet radikalizálódása Emily Dickinsontól Charles Bernsteinig" [Withdrawing the self: the radicalization of American poetry from Emily Dickinson to Charles Bernstein]. Irodalmi Jelen XXV. vol. (no. 271) (May 2024), 104-146.
- „Charlotte Perkins Gilman Magyarországon – És ami mögötte van (Elvhűség és „elvhűtlenség” egy életműben)” [Charlotte Perkins Gilman in Hungary — And what lies behind it (principled consistency and ‘unprincipled’ deviations in an oeuvre]. In: Anna Kérchy and Irén Annus (eds.), “So Far So Good” – Festschrift in Honour of Erzsébet Barát / Tanulmányok Barát Erzsébet köszöntésére. Szeged: SZTE BTK, 2023. 43-57.
- „Ginsberg, a nélkülözhetetlen” [Ginsberg the nonexpandable]. Múlt és Jövő XXXIV/1 (2023): 19-25.
- „Egy különös történelmi örökség rejtett működése az amerikai Dél prózairodalmában” [The hidden workings of a peculiar historical legacy in the fiction of the American South]. Magyar Tudomány 2022/3.
- „Mrs. vagy Ms. America? Kit igazolt a történelem?” [Mrs. or Ms. America? Who has been justified by history?] Országút 38 (2021).
- „Louise Glück, a személyesség fegyelmezett költője ” [Louise Glück, the disciplined poet of the personal]. Magyar Tudomány 2021/1. 45-53.
- „Hol kapja el a legény a leányt: a Rye gázlójánál vagy egy rozsmezőben? Egy kultuszregény újrafordításáról” [Where does the lad catch the lass: at the ford of the Rye or in a field of rye? On the retranslation of a cult novel]. In: Adrienn Gulyás, Judit Mudriczki, Enikő Sepsi, Géza Horváth (eds.), Klasszikus művek újrafordítása. Budapest: L’Harmattan, 2021. 171-181.
- “Behavioral Paradigms in the Short Fiction of Henry James: An Intersubjective Approach.” Eger Journal of American Studies. XVI (2020). 21-33.
- „Alkeszek, homárok és húhák – Salinger és Updike új fordításban” [Booze hounds, pansies, and hooers in the new traslations of Salinger and Updike]. Alföld 70/9 (2019): 67-80.
- “Plots of Domination, Plots of Relationality: On the Triangular Positioning of Characters in American and European Literature”. Americana—E - Journal of American Studies XV/1 (2019).
- “Önérték és távlatiság. Narratív személyköziség Henry James rövidprózájában” [Self-worth and perspectivism: narrative intersubjectivity in the short fiction of Henry James]. Alföld, 69/2 (2018). 43–53.
- “»Lába mint két ceruza hagyta írásnyomát az erdő haván«. Nyelvtani, kapcsolati és testi alanyiság H. D. HERmione című regényében” ["Her feet were pencils tracing a path through a forest". Grammatical, relational, and corporeal subjectivity in H. D.'s HERmione]. In: A szubjektum színeváltozásai. Narratív, kapcsolati és testi alanyiság az irodalomban és a kultúrában. Ed. Enikő Bollobás. Szeged: AMERICANA eBooks, 2017. 69–77.
- “Irodalom és szórakoztatás. Jonathan Franzen regényeiről” [Literature and entertainment: on Jonathan Franzen's novels]. Irodalmi Jelen, April 20, 2015.
- “Az amerikai megtérési történetek performatív retorikája” [The performative rhetoric of American conversion narratives]. In: CONVERSIO Vallástudományi konferencia. Ed. Balázs Déri. Budapest: ELTE Vallástudományi Központ, 2013. 429–437.
- “Játék a metafizikával: katakrézis és dekonstrukció két amerikai drámában (Mark Twain: Is He Dead? – David H. Hwang: M. Butterfly)” [Playing with metaphysics: catachresis and deconstruction in two American plays (Mark Twain, Is He Dead? – David H. Hwang, M. Butterfly)]. In: A fattyú művészet nyomában. Írások amerikai drámáról és színházról. Ed. Réka M. Cristian. Szeged: AMERICANA eBOOKS, 2012.
- “Troping the Unthought: Catachresis in Emily Dickinson’s Poetry.” The Emily Dickinson Journal 21.1 (Spring 2012). 25–56.
- “Tropes of Intersubjectivity—Metalepsis and Rhizome in the Novels of H.D. (Hilda Doolittle).” AMERICANA—E-Journal of American Studies VII/2 (2011).
- „Posztmodern paradigmaváltás az amerikanisztikában” [Postmodern paradigm shift in American Studies]. Magyar Tudomány 172/3 (2011). 308–316.
- “The Declaration of Independence and the Making of Americans: On how Performatives Perform the Performer.” Emlékkönyv Frank Tibor 60. születésnapjára [Festschrift for the 60th birthday of Tibor Frank]. Ed. Tamás Magyarics and Miklós Lojkó. Budapest: Prime Rate, 2008. 180–185.
- “Dangerous Liaisons: Politics and Epistemology in Post-Cold War American Studies.” American Quarterly (Baltimore) 54/4 (December 2002). 563–579.
- “Hogyan készül a nő? Lehetséges válaszok Ignotus, Szőcs Géza, Jonathan Swift, valamint Gertrude Stein és Djuna Barnes szerint” [How is woman made? Possible answers by Ignotus, Géza Szőcs, and Jonathan Swift, Gertrude Stein és Djuna Barnes]. Holmi XIV/3 (March 2002). 326–334.
- “Canon Politics and Experimental Writing: The Example of l’encre sympathique of Robert Duncan’s H.D. Book.” Paideuma: Studies in American and British Modernist Poetry (Orono, Maine) 35/1-2 (2006). 49–66.
- “Potencies of Words―On the Prosody of Robert Duncan.” Language and Style (New York) 19/3 (1986). 219–232. Repr. Poetry Criticism. Ed. Michelle Lee. Vol. 75. Detroit: Gale Group, 2007.
- “Measures of Attention: On the Grammetrics of Lineation in William Carlos Williams’ Poetry.” Poetry and Epistemology. Turning Points in the History of Poetic Knowledge. Ed. Roland Hagenbüchle and Laura Skandera. Eichstätt: Verlag Friedrich Pustet Regensburg, 1986. 262–277.
- “Poetry and Visual Enactment: the Concrete Poem.” Word and Image (London) II/3 (1986). 279–285.
- “Who’s Afraid of Irony? An Analysis of Uncooperative Behavior in Edward Albee’s Who’s Afraid of Virginia Woolf?” Journal of Pragmatics (Amsterdam) V/4 (1981). 323–334.

==== Poetry ====
- „Mert nincs rá szó, nincsen rá fogalom”: A katakrézis mint trópus és gesztus a költészetben [“For there is no word for it, no concept for it”: Catachresis as trope and gesture in poetry]. (Inaugural lecture for corresponding membership). In: Kölcsönösségek – Irodalomelmélet, szövegolvasás, kultúraközvetítés. Budapest: Balassi, 2020. 69-99.
- „Az újító költői hagyományok megújítója: Susan Howe” [Renewing the innovative poetic traditions: Susan Howe]. In: Zoltán Kulcsár-Szabó (ed.), Hagyomány és innováció a magyar és a világirodalomban [Tradition and innovation in world literature]. Budapest: Eötvös Kiadó, 2020. 143-168.
- “Historical Reconstruction, Rough Book Poetry, and the Withdrawal of the Self: Susan Howe and the Olsonian Tradition.” In: Pál Hegyi (ed.), Tradition and Innovation in Literature—From Antiquity to the Present. Budapest: Eötvös University Press, 2020. 81-110.
- „Maszk és Én – és a betegség: A lélek sérülései Sylvia Plath költészetében” [Mask and self – and the illness. Bruises of the soul in Sylvia Plath’s poetry]. In: József Gerevich (ed.), A képzelet kockázata. Sylvia Plath életműve, élettörténete és betegsége. Budapest: Noran, 2019. 19-44.
- “Ideogramma, szóhanglátvány és a költő önteremtése. Augusto de Campos verseiről” [Ideogram, the verbivocovisual, and the poet's self-creation. On Augusto de Campos's poetry]. Irodalmi Jelen, October 4, 2017.
- “A tenger és a szél szüntelen. Kodolányi Gyula költői műhelyében” [The sea and the wind incessantly. In the poetic workshop of Gyula Kodolányi]. Irodalmi Jelen, XVI/179 (2016). 116–136.
- “In Borrowed Words and Through Recycled Attentions: On Charles Bernstein’s Lyric and Elegiac Poetry”. Hungarian Journal of English and American Poetry, 22/2 (2016). 403–413.
- “In Imploded Sentences: On Charles Bernstein's Poetic Attentions”. Arcade Literature, the Humanities, & the World, November 15, 2015.
- “Imagism”. In American Poets and Poetry: From the Colonial Era to the Present. Vol. 1. Ed. Jeffrey H. Gray – Mary McAleer Balkun – James McCorkel. Santa Barbara: ABC–CLIO, 2015. 275–278.
- “Projective Verse”. In American Poets and Poetry: From the Colonial Era to the Present. Vol. 2. Ed. Jeffrey H. Gray – Mary McAleer Balkun – James McCorkel. Santa Barbara: ABC–CLIO, 2015. 510–509.
- “A performál visszaható ige? Az alany(iság) különös visszatérése a konkrét versben” [Is perform a reflexive verb? The strange return of subjectivity in the concrete poem]. In Visszhangot ver az időben'. Hetven írás Szegedy-Maszák Mihály születésnapjára. Ed. László Bengi – Márton Hoványi – Ildikó Józan. Pozsony: Kalligram, 2013. 65–73.
- “Troping the Unthought: Catachresis in Emily Dickinson’s Poetry”. The Emily Dickinson Journal, 21.1 (Spring 2012). 25–56.
- “Circumference & Co.: Catachresis as the Trope of Performativity in Emily Dickinson’s Poetry”. Hungarian Journal of English and American Studies, 18/1–2 (2012). 271–292.
- “Canon Politics and Experimental Writing: The Example of l’encre sympathique of Robert Duncan’s H. D. Book”. Paideuma: Studies in American and British Modernist Poetry, 35/1–2 (2006). 49–66.
- “Proceed to Precede: Ideas of Process and Origin in Charles Olson’s ‘On first Looking out through Juan de la Cosa’s Eyes’”. In The 1950s: Proceedings of the Biennial Conference of the Hungarian Association of American Studies. Ed. Enikő Bollobás – Szilvia Nagy. Budapest: ELTE, 2005. 157–167.
- “Énné váló álarc, álarccá váló Én (a tükörben): a plathi Bildung természetrajzához” [Mask becoming self, self becoming mask (in the mirror): on the concept of Plath’s Bildung]. In Modern sorsok és késő modern poétikák. Tanulmányok Sylvia Plathról és Ted Hughesról. Ed. István Rácz – Antal Bókay. Budapest: Janus/Gondolat, 2002. 59–78.
- “Antimetafizika és pre-konceptuális megismerés: a posztmodern episztémé megjelenése az amerikai költészetben” [Anti-metaphysics and pre-conceptual cognition: the appearance of the postmodern episteme in American poetry]. A Dunánál, I/1 (2001). 59–63.
- “Charles Olson, a posztmodern klasszikus” [Charles Olson, the postmodern classic]. Jelenkor, XLIV/3 (2001). 292–305.
- “‘My Son is a Magyar’: Ideas of Firstness and Origin in Charles Olson’s Poems”. Eger Journal of American Studies, VI (2000). 9–23.
- “Free Verse”. In Princeton Encyclopedia of Poetry and Poetics. Ed. Alex Preminger – T. V. Brogan. Princeton, N. J.: Princeton UP, 1993. 425–427. (Jointly with Donald Wesling. Repr.: in The New Princeton Handbook of Poetic Terms. Ed. T. V. Brogan. Princeton, N. J.: Princeton UP, 1994. 96–99.)
- “Visuality and Concretism: Enactments of the Real. On the Poetics of the American Avant-Garde”. Acta Litteraria Academiae Scientiarum Hungaricae, 30/3–4 (1988). 229–241.
- “Reiterated Discoveries: Poetry and Epistemology and Its Measures of Attention in American Modernist Writing”. Acta Litteraria Academiae Scientiarum Hungaricae, XXIX/1–2 (1987). 97–112.
- “Potencies of Words: A Grammetrical Reading of Robert Duncan’s ‘The Propositions 2’”. Language and Style, 19/3 (1986). 219–232. (Repr.: in Poetry Criticism. Ed. Michelle Lee. Vol. 75. Detroit: Gale Group, 2007.)
- “Measures of Attention: On the Grammetrics of Lineation in William Carlos Williams’ Poetry”. In Poetry and Epistemology. Turning Points in the History of Poetic Knowledge. Ed. Roland Hagenbüchle – Laura Skandera. Eichstätt: Verlag Friedrich Pustet, 1986. 262–277.
- “Prosodic Paradigms of English”. Annales Universitatis Scientiarum Budapestinensis de Rolando Eötvös Nominatae. Sectio Philologica Moderna, XIV (1983). 107–133.
- “On the Prosody of The Waste Land”. Annales Universitatis Scientiarum Budapestinensis de Rolando Eötvös Nominatae. Sectio Linguistica, XIV (1983). 89–111.
- “Two Twentieth Century Epic Writers: Whitman and Eliot”. John O’Hara Journal (Pottsville, Pennsylvania), V/1–2 (1982/83). 103–114.
- “Az amerikai hosszú vers whitmani hagyománya” [The Whitmanic tradition of the American long poem]. Világosság, XXIII/8–9 (August–September 1982). 526–532. (Repr.: Világosság, XLV/8–9 [August–September 2004]. 33–48.)
- “Nő és költő egyszemélyben? Konfliktusok Emily Dickinson, Sylvia Plath és Anne Sexton költészetében” [Woman and poet? Conflicts in the poetry of Emily Dickinson, Sylvia Plath and Anne Sexton]. Filológiai Közlöny, XXVII/1–2 (1981). 93–98.
- “New Prosodies in 20th Century American Free Verse”. Acta Litteraria Academiae Scientiarum Hungaricae, XX/1–2 (1979). 99–121.
- “On the Role of Visuality in Free Verse”. Studies in English and American (Budapest, ELTE), 4 (1978). 157–179.
- “A vizualitás szerepe a XX. századi amerikai szabadversben” [The role of visuality in 20th century free verse]. Filológiai Közlöny, XXIV/1 (1978). 89–96.

==== Theory of literature and language ====
- "Viszonosságban a szövegértelmezés és az irodalomelmélet – Hegyi Pál nagymonográfiája az amerikai fenségesről” [Interpretation and theory in dialogue – Pál Hegyi’s monograph on the American sublime]. Irodalmi Jelen. Aug. (2022).
- „Zoltán Kulcsár-Szabó, Tamás Lénárt, Attila Simon, Roland Végső (eds.). Life After Literature – Perspectives on Biopoetics in Literature and Theory”. Acta Philologica vol. 58 (2022): 173–176.
- „A hatalom háromszögei: Nevelődés, prostitúció, házasság és sorsszerelem Shaw és Synge drámáiban” [The triangles of power: education, prostitution, marriage and fated love in the dramas of Shaw and Synge]. Filológiai Közlöny LXVII (2021)/3. 11-24.
- “From Logocentric to Discursive—On the Paradigms of Performativity.” In: János Kenyeres and Éva Illés (eds.), Changing Perspectives—Studies in English at Eötvös Loránd University. Budapest: ELTE School of English and American Studies, 2021. 9-26.
- „Előszó” [Preface]. In: Elméletek vonzásában – A „határtalan tudomány” kezdetei a hatvanas-hetvenes évek humán- és társadalomtudományi kutatásaiban [In the orbit of theories: The beginnings of “boundless science” in the humanities and social sciences of the 1960s and 1970s.]. Ed. Enikő Bollobás. Budapest: Gondolat, 2019. 7-18.
- „Az első nyelvi fordulat Magyarországon – A strukturalista szemlélet megjelenése az irodalomtudományban” [The first linguistic turn in Hungary: The emergence of the structuralist perspective in literary studies]. In: Elméletek vonzásában – A „határtalan tudomány” kezdetei a hatvanas-hetvenes évek humán- és társadalomtudományi kutatásaiban [In the orbit of theories: The beginnings of “boundless science” in the humanities and social sciences of the 1960s and 1970s.]. Ed. Enikő Bollobás. Budapest: Gondolat, 2019. 113-155.
- “Catachresis as Metaphoric and Metonymic Meaning Extension: The Case of Poetic, Prophetic, and Political Discourse“. Estetica: Studi e Ricerche, VII/1 (2017). 121–138. (Jointly with Zoltán Kövecses.)
- “Narratív, kapcsolati, testi alanyiság, és az alany performatív megképzése. Elméleti bevezető a műhelytanulmányokhoz“ [Narrative, relational, and corporeal subjectivity and the performative construction of the subject. Theoretical introduction to the essays]. In A szubjektum színeváltozásai. Narratív, kapcsolati és testi alanyiság az irodalomban és a kultúrában. Ed. Enikő Bollobás. Szeged: AMERICANA eBooks, 2017. 2–14.
- “Képlet – kiterjesztés – gyakorlat. A performatív elméleti paradigmái és alkalmazásuk Ignotus, Nádas, Galgóczi, Márai és Kertész szövegeinek vizsgálatában“ [Formula – extension – practice. The theoretical paradigms of the performativive and their applications in reading the texts of Ignotus, Nádas, Galgóczi, Márai, and Kertész]. Filológiai Közlöny, 62/4 (2016). 264–302.
- “Katakrézis, avagy a nyelv nagy játéka [Catachresis, or the grand joke of language]. In Az angol tudománya. 125 éves az egyetemi angol szak. 1886–2011. Ed. Tibor Frank – Krisztina Károly. Budapest: ELTE Eötvös Press, 2013. 53–63.
- “Röviden a szubjektumperformativitásról – avagy Jonathan Swift csatlakozik a feministákhoz“ [On the performativity of the subject: Or, Jonathan Swift joins the feminists]. In Whack fol the dah. Írások Takács Ferenc 65. születésnapjára. Writings for Ferenc Takács on his 65th birthday. Ed. Ákos Farkas – Zsuzsa Simonkay – Janina Vesztergom. Budapest: ELTE English–American Institute, 2013. 193–202.
- “A katakretikus jelentésbővülésről – adalékok a jelentésváltozás tropológiájához“ [On catachretic meaning extension]. In VLIXX. Papers in Linguistics. Presented to László Varga on his 70th Birthday. Ed. Péter Szigetvári. Budapest: Tinta, 2013. 23–32.
- “Avatars of Tradition: Rainbows, Floodgates, and Enemy Camps in the U. S. Canon Debate“. Hungarian Journal of English and American Studies, 3/1 (1997). 117–138.
- “Gold-Diggers Welcome: Recent Hungarian Publications on Literary Theory“. Hungarian Journal of English and American Studies, 3/2 (1997). 252–270.
- “Who’s Afraid of Irony? An Analysis of Uncooperative Behavior in Edward Albee’s Who’s Afraid of Virginia Woolf?“ Journal of Pragmatics, V/4 (1981). 323–334.
- “Speech Acts in Literature“. Angol Filológiai Tanulmányok (Debrecen, KLTE), XIII (1980). 39–47.
- “Hogyan beszélnek az állatok?“ [How do animals speak?]. In Tanulmányok a nyelvről. Ed. Etel Takács. Budapest: OPI Pedagógus Továbbképzés Könyvtára, 1978. 21–33.
- “A szó hatalmáról – nyelvészeti megközelítésben“ [On the power of word – a linguistic approach]. In Az Országos Rabbiképző Intézet Évkönyve 1977/78. Ed. Sándor Scheiber. 1978. 82–90.

==== Hungarian literature ====
- „A megélt élet regénye – történetekben elbeszélve. Ádám Veronika: Távolból őrzöm” [The novel of a lived life—narrated in stories. Veronika Ádám’s I safeguard you from afar]. Magyar Tudomány 186/6 (2025). 1241-1245.
- „Aki szellemekkel és árnyakkal beszélgetett – Charles Fenyvesi emlékezete” [He who conversed with spirits and shadows—in memory of Charles Fenyvesi]. Kultúra, November 17, 2024. https://kultura.hu/fenyvesi-karoly-charles-fenyvesi/
- „»én vagyok s mégsem én vagyok« – Hangzásdúsítás, nyelvváltás és fantasztikum Szőcs Géza költészetében” [‘I am, and yet I am not’—sonoric intensification, language switching, and the fantastic in the poetry of Géza Szőcs]. Alföld 74/12 (2023). 49-65.
- „Igen, újra ezt. És harmadszor is” – Személyes visszaemlékezés Szőcs Géza 1982 és 1986 közötti éveire [‘Yes, this again. And a third time as well’—a personal recollection of Géza Szőcs’s years between 1982 and 1986]. In: Endre Farkas Wellmann (ed.), Szőcs Géza 70. Budapest: Petőfi Kulturális Ügynökség, 2023. 18-53.
- „Disztópikus »haza-versek«: Szőcs Géza két költeményéről” [Dystopian ‘homeland poems’: on two poems by Géza Szőcs]. Ambroozia 13/5 (2023).
- „Transzcendált immanencia, avagy az isteni bensősége – Szőcs Géza Esti ima című verséről” [Transcended immanence, or the intimacy of the divine—on Géza Szőcs’s poem Evening Prayer]. Helyőrség ma.
- „Létösszegzés, életszenvedély és nyelvtisztelet Böszörményi Zoltán költészetében” [Existential summation, passion for life, and reverence for language in the poetry of Zoltán Böszörményi]. In: Fellázadt szavak – Böszörményi Zoltán versei Márton László válogatásában. Budapest: Magyar PEN Club, 2023. 7-21.
- „Szőcs Géza az egyenes, tiszta beszéd költője volt. Ayhan Gökhan beszélget Bollobás Enikővel Szőcs Géza munkásságáról, irodalomtörténeti jelentőségéről és a mai korunkra alkalmazható gondolatairól” [Géza Szőcs was a poet of direct and unambiguous speech. Ayhan Gökhan in conversation with Enikő Bollobás on the work, literary-historical significance, and contemporary relevance of Géza Szőcs]. Kultúra.hu
- „Mesék az életért – Szőcs Géza rövidprózájáról” [Tales for life—on the short prose of Géza Szőcs]. Alföld 73/9(2022), 94-103.
- „A személytelenítés mintázatai Szőcs Géza költészetében” [Patterns of depersonalization in the poetry of Géza Szőcs]. Filológiai Közlöny LXVIII/3 (2022). 54-91.
- “Reményi József – A Literary Portraitist”. Irodalmi Jelen. (2022)
- „Nem telefon. Csak egy oltár. Szőcs Géza emlékezete”. [Not a telephone. Only an altar. In memory of Géza Szőcs]. Országút II/22 (2021). 6-8.
- „Emontekiő és a végtelen programok” [Emontekiő and the infinite programs]. In: Enikő Bollobás (ed.), Emontekiő és környéke – Tanulmányok Szőcs Géza költői munkásságáról [Emontekiő and its surroundings—studies on the poetry of Géza Szőcs]. Budapest: Irodalmi Jelen, 2021. 5-14.
- „Mint öt meg öt a tízben” – Az isteni létmódjának emberi megjelenései Szőcs Géza költészetében [„As five and five make ten”—human manifestations of the divine mode of being in the poetry of Géza Szőcs]. In: Enikő Bollobás (ed.), Emontekiő és környéke – Tanulmányok Szőcs Géza költői munkásságáról [Emontekiő and its surroundings—studies on the poetry of Géza Szőcs]. Budapest: Irodalmi Jelen, 2021. 42-92.
- „A politikai pornográfiától az elbeszélhetetlenség kényszeres újramondásáig – Parodisztikus kettős beszéd Esterházy Péter két regényében” [From political pornography to the compulsive rearticulation of the unsayable—parodic double discourse in two novels by Péter Esterházy]. In: Tibor Bónus, Hajnalka Halász, Csongor Lőrincz, Róbert Smid (eds.), Hatástörténések : Tanulmányok Kulcsár Szabó Ernő 70. születésnapjára. Budapest: Ráció Kiadó, 2020. 386-403.
- “The Double Entendre of Sex: Pornographies of Body and Society in Péter Esterházy’s Fiction”. Hungarian Cultural Studies 12 (2019). 255-267.
- “Intersubjective Exorcism and Giving Face to the Dead: Péter Nádas’s Encounter as Reverse Prosopopeia“. In Kősziklára építve. Írások Dávidházi Péter tiszteletére. Built Upon His Rock: Writings in Honour of Péter Dávidházi. Ed. Dániel Panka – Natália Pikli – Veronika Ruttkay. Budapest: ELTE BTK English–American Institute, Department of English Studies, 2018. 29–35.
- “Képlet – kiterjesztés – gyakorlat. A performatív elméleti paradigmái és alkalmazásuk Ignotus, Nádas, Galgóczi, Márai és Kertész szövegeinek vizsgálatában” [Formula – extension – practice. The theoretical paradigms of the performativive and their applications in reading the texts of Ignotus, Nádas, Galgóczi, Márai, and Kertész]. Filológiai Közlöny, 62/4 (2016). 264–302.
- “Nők férfiak között: a Márai-háromszögről” [Women between men—on the Márai-triangle]. Irodalomtörténeti Közlemények 116.4 (2012). 413–421.
- “A tekintettől és a vágytól megalkotott nő” (Szerb Antal: „Két cigaretta közt”; Török Sophie: „Arcképtanulmány”) [Woman constructed by the gaze and desire]. In: Egy képlet nyomában – Karakterelemzések az amerikai és a magyar irodalomból [In search of a formula – analyzing American and Hungarian literary characters]. Budapest: Balassi, 2012. 86–88.
- “A tárgyi megképzettség elbizonytalanodása két magyar férfiszerzőnél” (Ignotus: „Ki maga?”; Kosztolányi Dezső: elbeszélések, Édes Anna) [Woman as object destabilized]. In: Egy képlet nyomában – Karakterelemzések az amerikai és a magyar irodalomból [In search of a formula – analyzing American and Hungarian literary characters]. Budapest: Balassi, 2012. 123–130.
- “Kísérletek a női alanyiságra” (Kaffka Margit: Színek és évek, Mária évei; Németh László: Iszony) [Attempting female subjecthood]. In: Egy képlet nyomában – Karakterelemzések az amerikai és a magyar irodalomból [In search of a formula – analyzing American and Hungarian literary characters]. Budapest: Balassi, 2012. 130–140.
- “Parodisztikus játék a szubjektumperformativitással (Rácz Zsuzsa két Terézanyujáról)” [Parodic play with the performativity of the subject: on Zsuzsa Rácz’s two Terézanyu’s]. Műút 56/1 (2011). 55–58.
- “A Nation’s Poetry as Language, History, and Selfhood. Contemporary Hungarian Poets/Kortárs magyar költészet.” τό τόπος Poetry International 9 (Winter 2006). 6–8.
- “On Contemporary Hungarian Literature.” Pa Fang (Hong Kong) 8 (1988). 226-37. Repr. United Daily News Literary Supplement (Taipei, Taiwan). 5–20, 1988.

==== Jewish studies ====
- „Két diktatúra áldozata mai szerző célkeresztjében” [The victim of two dictatorships in the crosshair of a contemporary author]. Országút, February 23, 2026.
- “Opening Doors and Building Bridges: The Legacy of Rabbi Sándor Scheiber and my own Father.” In: E. André Mozes (ed.), New Philosemitism Paradigm. Paris: L'Harmattan, 2023. 259-267.
- “A két ajtó – Scheiber Sándor öröksége” [The two doors – The legacy of Sándor Scheiber]. In: Ki szereti a zsidókat? A magyar filoszemitizmus [Who likes the Jews? Hungarian philosemitism]. Ed. Endre Mózes. Budapest: Noran Libro, 2014. 205–212.
- “Scheiber Sándor tanítása az örömről. Gondolatok egy kiadatlan írása kapcsán” [Sándor Scheiber’s teachings on joy—thoughts on an unpublished writing]. Filológiai Közlöny LIX (2013). 503–520.
- “The Two Doors of Sándor Scheiber – The Scholar Rabbi Born a Hundred Years Ago.” Hungarian Review IV/4 (2013). 87–102.
- “A mai amerikai zsidó (női) irodalomról” [About American Jewish Women Writers]. Remény I/2 (1998). 103–106.
- “Az én élő emlékezetem (Scheiber Sándor emlékére)” [My living memory. In memoriam Rabbi Alexander Scheiber]. In Az Országos Rabbiképző Intézet Évkönyve [Yearbook of the Hungarian Rabbinical Seminary] 1992/95. Ed. József Schweitzer. Budapest, 1995. 18–23. Repr. „Búcsú Arany Jánostól” [Farewell to János Arany. In memoriam Rabbi Alexander Scheiber]. In A könyvek hídja. Emlékfüzér Scheiber Sándorról. Ed. Péter Kertész. Budapest: Urbis Könyvkiadó, 266–275. 2005.
- “A szó hatalmáról ― nyelvészeti megközelítésben” [On the power of words― a linguistic approach]. In Az Országos Rabbiképző Intézet Évkönyve [Yearbook of the Hungarian Rabbinical Seminary] 1977/78. Ed. Sándor Scheiber. Budapest, 1978. 82–90.

==== Society and politics ====
- „A Fürth-Budapest gondolatexpressz: Antall és Kissinger találkozója” [The Fürth-Budapest intellectual highway – on the meetings between József Antall and Henry Kissinger]. Országút 2024/1. 10-11.
- “The Fürth-Budapest Intellectual Highway: On the Personal Meetings between Henry Kissinger and József Antall.” Hungarian Review XV/1 (2024). 90-94.
- „Aki szellemekkel és árnyakkal beszélgetett: Charles Fenyvesi emlékezete” [He who conversed with spirits and shadows—in memory of Charles Fenyvesi]. Kultúra, November 17, 2024.
- „Tudósok, tudományok és örömök” [Scientists, sciences, and joys]. Magyar Tudomány 2021/2 (2021).
- “United in Separation: On the Common Roots of Pennsylvanian and Transylvanian Anabaptism.” Hungarian Review III/5 (2012). 74–84.
- “Hungarian in America – American in Hungary. János Xántus, the 19th Century Naturalist.” Hungarian Review III/2 (2012). 88–101.
- “The Future of Our Past: Hungary’s Cultural Struggle with its Communist Legacy.” Macalester International 2 (1995). 158–179.
- “In Hungary, Post-Liberation Blues.” The Washington Post. August 6, 1992. Opinion page. (Repr. International Herald Tribune, Aug. 18; Sen. Joe Lieberman, “Farewell to a Friend.” Congressional Record, Sept. 8, 1992.)
- “When Dreams of Democracy Come True.” The Washington Post. September 1, 1991. Opinion page. (Repr. International Herald Tribune, Sept. 5; Sen. Joe Lieberman, “Message from Hungary.” Congressional Record, Sept. 10, 1991.)

==== Women’s studies, gender studies ====
- „Ajánlás” [Commendation]. In: Diana Hay, Mária Palasik, Mária Schadt (eds.), Nők a tudomány fellegvárában – Kutatói életutak a Magyar Tudományos Akadémián 1949−2021 [Women in the Stronghold of Science: Research Career Paths at the Hungarian Academy of Sciences, 1949–2021]. Budapest: Akadémiai Kiadó, 2024. 1-2.
- “Committee Chair’s Introduction”. In: Réka M. Cristian and Anna Kérchy (eds.), Pioneer Hungarian Women in Science and Education II. Budapest: Akadémiai Kiadó, 2023. 11-21.
- “Committee Chair’s Introduction”. In: Réka M. Cristian and Anna Kérchy (eds.), Pioneer Hungarian Women in Science and Education I. Budapest: Akadémiai Kiadó, 2022. 11-20.
- “A genderrelativitásról – két overallos nő kapcsán” [On the relativity of gender—or, two women in overalls]. TNTeF 2.1 (2012). 5–19.
- “A metalepszis mint kultúranarrativizációs trópus H.D. regényeiben” [Metalepsis as a trope of cultural narrativity in H.D.’s novels]. A mondat becsülete – Írások a hetvenéves Abádi Nagy Zoltán tiszteletére [The honesty of the sentence—Essays in honor of the seventy year old Zoltán Abádi-Nagy]. Ed. Tamás Bényei, Enikő Bollobás, István D. Rácz. Debrecen: Debreceni Egyetemi Kiadó, 2010. 262–270.
- “A valaki, a senki és a senkiből lett valaki – Szubjektivitás és szubjektiváció az amerikai irodalomban” [Somebody, Nobody, and Nobody turned Somebody—Subjectivity and subjectivítion in American literature]. Anglisztika és amerikanisztika. Magyar kutatások az ezredfordulón [English and American Studies – Hungarian scholarship in the new millennium]. Ed. Tibor Frank and Krisztina Károly. Budapest: Tinta.
- “Performansz és performativitás – a női, a meleg és a nem fehér szubjektumok nagy előadásai az irodalomban” [Performance and performativity—staging female, gay, and non-white subjectivities in literature]. A nő mint szubjektum, a női szubjektum [The woman as subject, the female subject]. Ed. Nóra Séllei. Orbis Litterarum. Debrecen: Kossuth Egyetemi Kiadó, 2007. 17–57.
- “From Consciousness Raising to Intellectual Empowerment: Teaching Gender Since the Early 1980s.” In: The Teaching of Gender Studies in Hungarian Higher Education. Ed. Andrea Pető. Budapest: IcsSzEM, 2006. 22–28.
- “Hogyan készül a nő? Lehetséges válaszok Ignotus, Szőcs Géza, Jonathan Swift, valamint Gertrude Stein és Djuna Barnes szerint” [How is woman made? Possible answers by Ignotus, Géza Szőcs, and Jonathan Swift, Gertrude Stein és Djuna Barnes]. Holmi XIV/3 (March 2002). 326–334.
- “‘Totalitarian Lib’: The Legacy of Communism for Hungarian Women.” Gender Politics and Post-Communism. Reflections from Eastern Europe and the Former Soviet Union. Ed. Nanette Funk and Magda Mueller. New York: Routledge, 1993. 20 1–206.
- “Metonimiák, tálentumok és sikolyok” [Metonymies, talents, and screams]. Magyar Napló II/30 (1990). 26.
- “Tetovált bíboros, avagy a nőprobléma Magyarországon” [The tattooed cardinal, or the women’s problem in Hungary]. Magyar Nemzet. April 18, 1990. 5.
- “Feminista tövisek Fekete Gyulának” [Feminist Thorns for Gyula Fekete]. Hitel 13 (1989). 52–53.
- “Megújuló Nőmozgalom” [The revival of the women’s movement]. Nők Lapja XLI (1989). 520–521.

==== Translations ====
- Amy Lowell, “Egy évtized” [A Decade]. Magyar Napló X/2 (1998). 13.
- H. D., “Hegyi nimfa” [Oread]. “Szerelem szívemben” [Love That I Bear]. “A tó” [The Pool]. Magyar Napló X/2 (1998). 13.
- Denise Levertov, “Asszony egyedül” [Woman Alone]. Magyar Napló X/2 (1998). 24.
- Sherley Anne Williams, “Páva versek I-III” [Peacock Poems I-III]. Magyar Napló X/2 (1998). 28.
- Clayton Eshleman, “A Szandzso-híd” [The Sanjo Bridge]. Magyar Szemle IV/4 (1995). 353–360.
- Denise Levertov, “Jegyzetek az organikus formáról” [Notes on Organic Form]. Helikon XXIII1-3 (1987). 180–185.
- “Az Olson-Creeley levelezés” [The Olson-Creeley correspondence; excerpts]. Helikon XXIII (1987)/1-3, 192–198.
- Judy Syfers, “Feleséget akarok” [I Want a Wife]. Új Tükör XIX/24 (1982). 11.
- Isaac Babel, “Sábosz Náchamu, a Vígasztalás Szombatja” [Shabos Nachamu]. Nagyvilág XII/9 (1972). 1333–1337. Repr. in Alexander Scheiber, Folklór és tárgytörténet [Folklore and the history of motifs]. III. Budapest, 1984. 455–465.
