= Enikő A. Sajti =

Hungarian historian, professor emerita (born 1944)

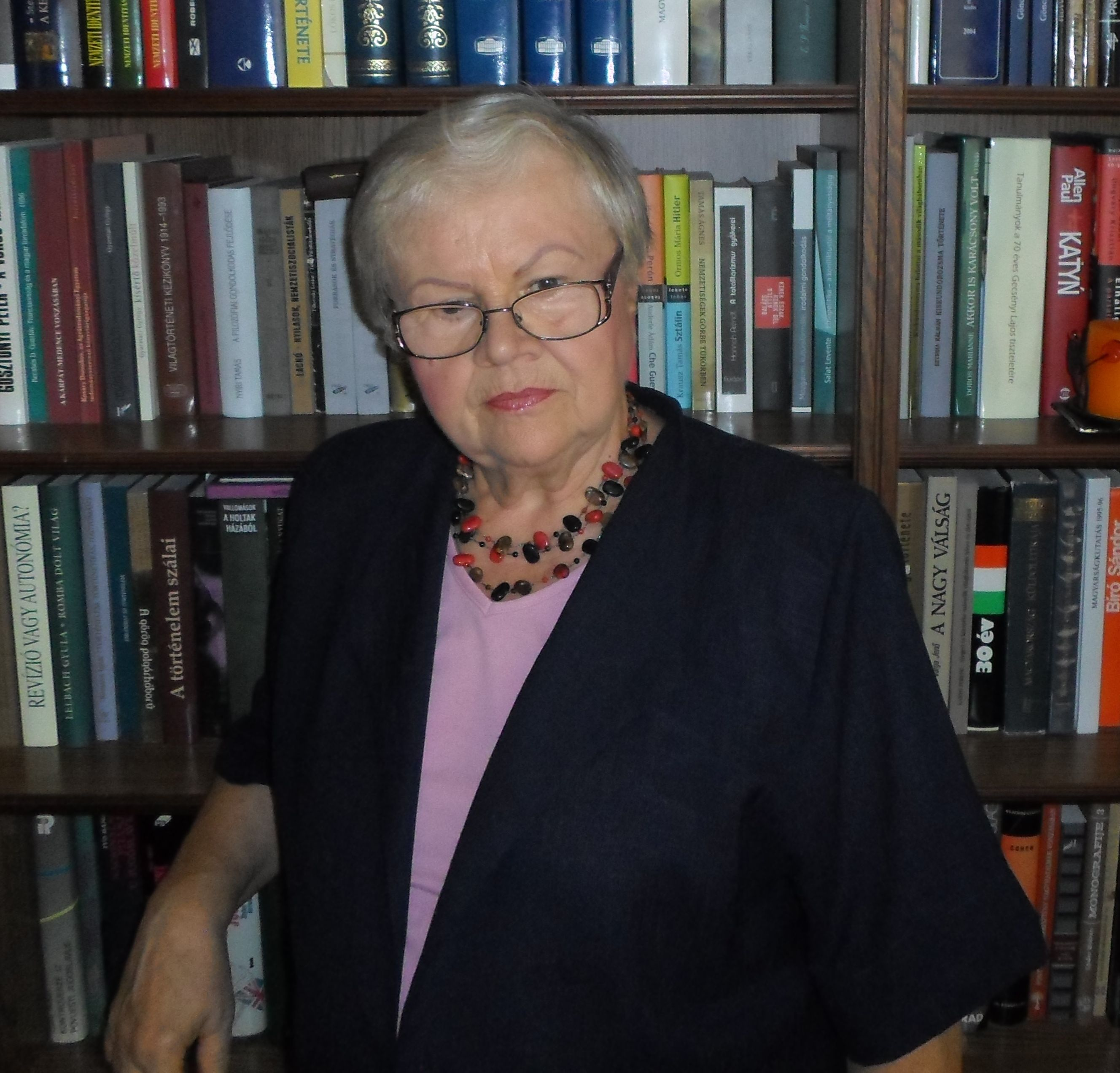
- Born: 13 September 1944 (age 82); Nagyszalonta, Hungary (now Salonta, Romania)
- Education: Attila József University
- Known for: Hungarians in the Voivodina 1918–1947
- Spouse: Ádám Anderle
- Awards: Albert Szent-Györgyi Award (2008)
- Scientific career
- Fields: History of the Balkans in the 19th and 20th centuries; Hungarian-Yugoslav relations; Question of the Hungarian minority
- Workplaces: University of Szeged

Enikő A. Sajti (Hungarian: [ˈɛnikøː ˈʃɒjti]; born 13 September 1944) is a Hungarian historian and professor emerita of Faculty of Arts, University of Szeged. She has been active in research of the relationship between Serbia & Croatia (Yugoslavia) and Hungary for decades. She is a notable and respected scientist both in Hungary and around the world.

== Biography and career ==
She took M. A. degree in Russian philology and history at the Attila József University (JATE), Szeged, Faculty of Arts in 1967.

She began her career as a high school teacher. In 1973 she started as a research fellow of the Department of Modern History at the Faculty of Arts, JATE, and later she became an associate professor (docent, reader). She was appointed to the head of the department, and she acted as a head from 1985 until 1995. She was the deputy dean in charge of education at the Faculty of Arts, JATE from 1991 until 1994. She took candidate (C.Sc.) of history degree in 1984 and was awarded Doctor of Science (D.Sc.) degree in history in 2003. In 1998 she habilitated. In 1999 she was appointed to university (full) professor of the Department of Modern History and Mediterranean Studies. From 2001 until 2014 she acted as a subprogram leader of modern history in the Doctoral School of History at the University of Szeged, and she was a member of the Council of the Doctoral School of History and a VIP member of the doctoral school. She was an invited lecturer of the Interdisciplinary Doctoral School at the Faculty of Arts at the University of Pécs. In 2014 the honorific title of professor emerita was conferred upon her. She has done research abroad, in Belgrade, Zagreb and Novi Sad for several times.

She presents her talks at several conferences and at the different science forums and she developed significant research and professional relationships.

Her working papers were issued in both national and international prestigious professional research scientific journals, and 12 monographs and 150 scientific articles were published.

== Committee memberships ==
- Attila József University (JATE), Scientific Committee of the Faculty of Arts, secretary (1984–1987)
- JATE, Faculty of Arts, Department of Modern History, head (1985–1995)
- JATE, Scientific Committee of the Faculty of Arts, deputy chairperson (1987–1988)
- JATE, Rehabilitation Committee, member (1990–1991)
- JATE, Faculty of Arts, Deputy dean for Education (1991–1994)
- University of Szeged (SZTE), Faculty of Arts, Council of the Doctoral School of History, member (2005–2014)
- Hungarian Society for Dissemination of Scientific Knowledge (TIT) in Csongrád County, deputy chairperson (1988–1993)
- Hungarian Academy of Sciences (HAS), Eastern European Complex Committee, member (1985–1991)
- HAS, member of the Public Body
- Hungarian Historical Society, Board of Directors, member, deputy chairperson
- Századok (Periodical of the Hungarian Historical Society), Member of the Scientific Redaction
- Múltunk (Our Past - Journal on political history) – Advisory Board, member
- Council of the Regional Centre of the Hungarian Academy of Sciences (SZAB), member, History Commission (Szeged)

== Awards and honors ==
- Széchenyi Professor Scholarship (Ministry of Education of Hungary) (1998–2001)
- Albert Szent-Györgyi Award (Ministry of Education of Hungary), 2008
- Teacher's Service Medal (Pedagógus Szolgálati Emlékérem) (Ministry of Human Capacities of Hungary), 2013
- Délvidék Kutatásáért Emlékérem (Medal for Research in the Southern Province) (Délvidék Kutatóközpont; Research Center for the Southern Province), 2015
- Gold Diploma (SZTE, 2017)

== Selected works ==
=== Papers ===
- Útkeresés. A Jugoszláv Kommunista Párt nemzetiségpolitikai koncepciójának formálódása az 1920-as években. Századok, 1979/3. 376–420.
- Ismeretlen dokumentum az 1942 januári délvidéki razzia résztvevőinek peréről. (Co-author György Markó), Hadtörténelmi Közlemények, 1985. 2.sz. XXXII. 426–456.
- Territoriale Revision und die Nationalitatenverhaltnisse. Ethnicity and Society in Hungary. Ferenc Glatz (ed.): Etudes Historiques Hongroises 1990 publiées á loccassion du XVII e Congrés International des Sciences Historiques par le Comité National des Historiens Hongrois. Budapest, 1990. 393–406.
- A háború elõtti évek. Lajos Serfõzõ (ed.): Szeged története. 4. 1919–1944. Serial editor Gyula Kristó. Szeged, 1994. 447–472.
- Changes in the Situation of the Hungarian Minority in Yugoslavia during the Period of Royal Dictatorship (1929–1941) Chronica. Annual of the Institut of History University of Szeged. 2001. Volume 1. 128–152.
- Az impériumváltás hatása a délvidéki magyarok társadalomszerkezetére. Limes, 2002. 2. sz. 41–50.
- Impériumváltás, magyarellenes megtorlások, kitelepítések és a konszolidáció feltételeinek kialakulása a Délvidéken 1944–1947. Századok, 2002., 136. évf., 5.sz. 1061–1114.
- The former ‘Southlands’ in Serbia: 1918–1947. The Hungarian Quarterly. Volume 47. No. 181. Spring 2006. 111–124.
- Ötvenhatos menekültek Jugoszláviában. A magyar-jugoszláv hazatelepítési bizottságok tevékenysége 1956–1957-ben. In.: Az 1956-os forradalom visszhangja a szovjet tömb országaiban. Évkönyv, XIV. 2006–2007. Budapest, 1956-os Intézet. 2007. 201–212.
- A „kommunizmus mostohagyermekei”: a magyar kisebbség elleni megtorlások a Délvidéken (a Vajdaságban) – a kutatás eredményei és kérdőjelei. Létünk. Társadalom, tudomány, kultúra. Forum Könyvkiadó, Újvidék, XXXVIII.évfolyam, 20008. 3. szám. 28–42.
- Egy kommunista káder a külügyben 1945–1948: Rex József. Forrás, 41. évf, 2009. 7–8. szám. 89–109.
- „Én ezeket magamtól meg sem írtam volna...” Katolikus egyházi források a magyarok elleni partizánmegtorlásokról a Bácskában. In: Gecsényi, Lajos – Izsák, Lajos (eds.): Magyar történettudmány az ezredfordulón. Glatz Ferenc 70. születésnapjára. ELTE Eötvös Kiadó – MTA Társadalomkutató Központ, Budapest, 2011. 567–575.
- Háború, kisebbségpolitika, megtorlás: magyarok és szerbek 1941–1945. Élet és Irodalom, 2011. year 55, No. 36 3–4., 12. o.
- A magyar vagyonok kisajátítása, államosítása Jugoszláviában 1945 után. Eksproprijacija i nacionalizacija mađarske svojine u Jugoslaviji nakon 1945. In.: A. Sajti, Enikő – Juhász, József – Molnár, Tibor (eds.): A titói rendszer megszilárdulása a Tisza mentén (1945–1955). Konsolidacija Titovog režima na Potisju (1945–1955) = Hajnal, Jenő (eds.): A titói jugoszlávia levéltári forrásai 4. Arhivski izvori titove Jugoslavije 4. Zentai Történelmi Levéltár, Magyar Nemzeti Levéltár Csongrád Megyei Levéltára, Zenta=Senta, Szeged=Segedin, 2013.. 133–159., 327–354.
- „A nemzeti lelkiismeret őrállója”. Cseres Tibor: Hideg napok és a „még hidegebb napok”. Forrás, year 47. 2015. No. 4. 97–106.
- „A mai napon megszűnt a szabadság szeplőtlen fogantatása.” Várady Imre hétköznapjai a Bánátban 1941–1945. In: Gyarmati, György – Pihurik, Judit (eds.): Háborús hétköznapok hadszíntéren, hátországban 1939–1945., Magyar Történelmi Társulat, Kronosz Kiadó, Állambiztonsági Szolgálatok Történeti Levéltára, Budapest–Pécs, 2015. 77–89.
- Svest o krivici i nadmoć pobednika: Mađarska i Jugoslavija 1945–1947. u svetlu mađarskih dokumenata. In: Зоран Јањетовић (ed-in-chief): 1945. крај или нови почетак? / [главни и одговорни уредник Зоран Јањетовић] / – Београд : Институт за новију историју Србије : Музеј жртава геноцида, 2016. – (Библиотека Зборници радова; бр. 13). Str. 531–555. ISBN 978-86-7005-133-1
- "Hideg emlékezet", vagy befogadó emlékezetkultúra? A magyar történetírás a partizán megtorlásokról (PDF) (in Hungarian). Gálffy, László és Sáringer, János (eds.): Fehér Lovag: tanulmányok Csernus Sándor 65. születésnapjára. Szeged: Lazi Könyvkiadó; SZTE BTK Középkori Egyetemes Történeti Tanszék. 2015. pp. 422–429. ISBN 978 963 267 270 0

=== Books ===
- Székely telepítés és nemzetiségpolitika a Bácskában – 1941. = Nemzetiségi füzetek 6., Akadémiai Kiadó, Budapest, 1984.
- Délvidék 1941–1944. A magyar kormányok délszláv politikája. Kossuth Kiadó, Budapest, 1987. ISBN 963 09 3078 1
- Josip Broz Tito. (Polonyi Péter: Mao Ce-tung) Fekete-fehér. Pannonica Kiadó, 2000, 163–307. pp. ISBN 963 9252 24 7
- Hungarians in the Voivodina 1918–1947 = Atlantic Studies on Society in Change No. 110. Highland Lakes, New Jersey, 2003. (ford.: Brian Mc Lean) ISBN 0-88033-522-X
- Impériumváltások, revízió, kisebbség. Magyarok a Délvidéken 1918–1947. Napvilág Kiadó, Budapest, 2004. ISBN 963 9350 37 0
- Bűntudat és győztes fölény. Magyarország, Jugoszlávia és a délvidéki magyarok. Szeged, 2010. ISBN 978-963-482-974-4
- Mađari u Vojvodini 1918–1947. Izdavački zavod Forum, Novi Sad, 2010. ISBN 978-86-323-0799-5
- Kisebbségpolitika és társadalomszervezés. Várady Imre (1867–1959) bánáti magyar politikus iratai. Forum Könyvkiadó, 2016. ISBN 978-86-323-0966-1

== Bibliography ==
- "Enikő A. Sajti". Hungarian Doctoral Council. Personal Data Sheet.
