= Ádám Anderle =

Hungarian historian, hispanist (1943–2016)

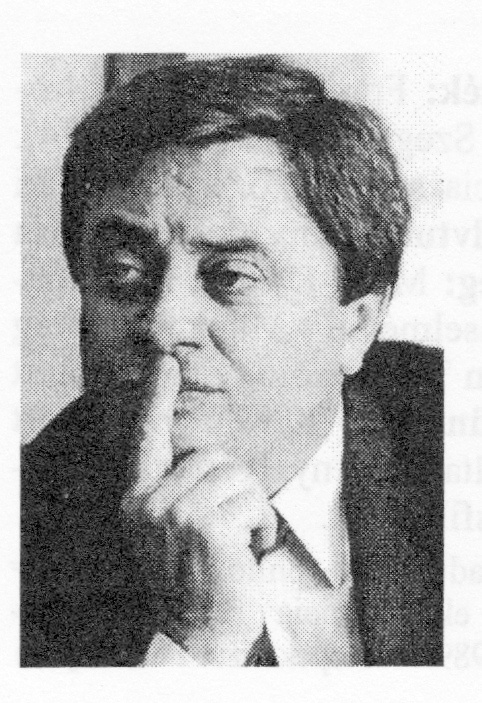
- Born: February 25, 1943; Kozármisleny, Hungary
- Died: 19 November 2016 (aged 73); Szeged, Hungary
- Education: Attila József University (JATE)
- Known for: Latin America; Modern history
- Spouse: Enikő A. Sajti
- Awards: Orden del Mérito Civil (1997); Orden de Isabel la Católica (2008); Order of Merit of the Republic of Hungary (2013)
- Scientific career
- Fields: Political History and History of Ideas in Spain and Latin America: 19th-20th centuries History of hispano-hungarian relations
- Workplaces: University of Szeged (SZTE)

Ádám Anderle (Hungarian: [ˈaːdaːm ˈɒndɛrlɛ]; February 25, 1943 – November 19, 2016) was a Hungarian historian, hispanist, full (university) professor, professor emeritus of Faculty of Arts, University of Szeged (SZTE). He was active in research of the relationship between Latin America and Hungary for decades. He was fluent in Hungarian and Spanish.

== Biography and career ==
He took M. A. degrees at the Attila József University (JATE), Faculty of Arts in Hungarian and History in 1966.

During his academic years he also learned Spanish language because he was interested in the history of Cuba, Latin America and Spain. Tibor Wittman raised Anderle's interest in the Hispanic world.

Anderle received his dr. univ. (doctor universitatis) degree in 1967.

In 1969 he became an educator and a research fellow in the Department of Medieval Universal History and History of Latin America, at the Faculty of Arts, JATE.

He took candidate (C.Sc.) of History degree in 1977 and was awarded Doctor of Science (D.Sc.) degree in history in 1988.

In 1977, he became an associate professor (docent, reader).

He was appointed to the head of the department, and he acted as a head from 1983 until 1992.

In 1989, he received the title of university (full) professor.

In 1993, he founded the Department of Hispanic Studies, and he headed it until 2008.

From 1997 until 2013, he acted as a subprogram leader of Modern history in the Doctoral School of History at the University of Szeged, and he was a member of the Council of the Doctoral School of History and a VIP member of the doctoral school.

In 2013, the honorific title of professor emeritus was conferred upon him.

He was considered a respected scientist both in Hungary and around the world and developed significant research and professional relationships.

Anderle lectured as a visiting professor at several universities of Latin America: Santa María University in Caracas, National University of San Marcos in Lima, University of Havana in Cuba, and at the universities of Europe: University of Alcalá in Alcalá de Henares, Spain and University of Göttingen in Germany.

His working papers were issued in both national and international prestigious professional research scientific journals, and 20 books and 200 scientific articles were published.

== Committee memberships ==
- Attila József University (JATE), Faculty of Arts, Deputy dean (1985–1986)
- JATE, head of the department, Department of Medieval Universal History and History of Latin America (1985−1993)
- Research Group Leader (1982−1992)
- Founding head of the Department of Hispanic Studies (1993−2008)
- University of Szeged (SZTE), Doctoral Council of the university, member (2000-2005)
- SZTE, Habilitation Council of the university, member (2000-2014)
- SZTE, Dean's Council of the Faculty of Arts, member (1998-2015)
- SZTE, Doctoral Council of the Faculty of Arts, member (1996-2001)
- SZTE, Faculty of Arts, Council of the Doctoral School of History, member, Modern history Programme, head (1997-2013)
- AHILA – Association of European Latin Americanist Historians, Hungarian coordinator (1975–83), member of the executive committee (1983–93), president (1987–90), honorary member (2015-2016)
- CEISAL – European Council for Social Research on Latin America, president of the Immigration Section (1990-1995)
- Association of Hungarian Latin Americanist Historians, president (1989-1996)
- Hungarian Historical Society, Board of Directors, member (1990-1995)
- Council of the Regional Centre of the Hungarian Academy of Sciences (SZAB), member, and President of the Philosophy and History Commission (Szeged) (1990–1993, 1996–2000, 2002–2005, 2008–2010)
- Hungarian Scientific Students' Associations (OTDT), president of the Human Section (1996-2003)
- Joint Committee of the Spanish-Hungarian Historians, president (2003-2010)
- OTDT, Board of Directors, member (2003-2015)
- Hungarian Academy of Sciences (HAS), member of the Public Body
- Historia Latinoamericana en Europa. Bulletin of AHILA (Liverpool), editorial board member (1985-1993)
- Anuario Mariáteguiano (Lima), international advisory board member
- Acta Histórica. Estudios Latinoamericanos, yearbook editor (1982-1993)
- Acta Hispánica, yearbook editor (1996-2008)
- Jacobus. Revista de Estudios Jacobeos y Medievales, Valladolid, editorial board member (2003-2008)
- Mediterranean World. Journal of Social Sciences (Veszprém, Hungary), editorial committee member (2008-2016)
- Fundación José Carlos Mariátegui, Board of Trustees, founding member (Lima) (2009-2016)
- Világtörténet (Hungarian journal World History, Institute of History of the Research Centre for the Humanities of the HAS), advisory board member (2008-2016)

== Awards and honors ==
- Premio Extraordinario José Carlos Mariátegui (Casa de las Américas, 1981)
- 1997: Orden del Mérito Civil, Commander
- 1999: Order of Merit for Distinguished Service (Orden al Mérito por Servicios Distinguidos), Peru
- 2008: Orden de Isabel la Católica, Encomienda de Número.
- Széchenyi Professor Scholarship (Ministry of Education of Hungary) (1997-2000)
- Master Teacher Gold Medal (OTDT-HAS, 1999)
- Gyula Juhász Prize (2003)
- Pro Universitate (2008)
- Doctor Honoris Causa Pro Scientia (OTDT, 2011)
- Order of Merit of the Republic of Hungary, Officer's Cross (2013)
- Gold Diploma (SZTE, 2016)

== Bibliography ==
- Berta, Tibor et al. (eds.): Az identitás régi és új koordinátái: tanulmányok Anderle Ádám 65. születésnapjára (Papers on Ádám Anderle's 65th Birthday), Szeged: Faculty of Arts, University of Szeged, Hispanisztika Tanszék Budapest: Palatinus, 2008

== Selected works ==
=== Papers ===
- A Rajk-per spanyolországi előzményei. Századok, 149:(6) pp. 1327–1361. (2015)
- Cuba en la historiografía húngara In: Opatrný Josef (ed.) Ibero-Americana Pragensia Supplementum 35: El Caribe hispanoparlante en las obras de sus historiadores. Konferencia helye, ideje: Csehország, 2013.09.06-2013.09.07. Prága: Karolinum, 2014. pp. 49–59. ISBN 978-80-246-2437-2
- El latinoamericanismo en Hungría. Társszerzőkkel: Fischer Ferenc, Lilón Domingo. ANUARIO AMERICANISTA EUROPEO 8: pp. 157–173. (2010)
- Történelmi minták és utak. Esszék Spanyolországról és Latin-Amerikáról. Szeged: Szerzői kiadás, 2009. 213 p. ISBN 978 963 482 931 7
- Magyar kivándorlás Latin-Amerikába az első világháború előtt. Szerző: Torbágyi Péter; szerk. Anderle Ádám. Szeged; SZTE Történettudományi Doktori Iskola, 2009.
- A magyar emigráció Latin-Amerikában. Történelmi vázlat. Külügyi szemle 3: pp. 174–192. (2008)
- A magyar forradalom és a hispán világ. In: Anderle Ádám (ed.) A magyar forradalom és a hispán világ, 1956. Szeged: Szegedi Tudományegyetem, Bölcsészettudományi Kar, 2007. pp. 13–19. ISBN 978 963 482 806 8
- A magyar kérdés. Spanyol követi jelentések Bécsből 1848–1868. Szerk. Anderle Ádám. Szeged: Hispánia Kiadó, 2002. 258 p.
- Kutatási Közlemények III. A magyar-katalán kapcsolatok ezer éve. Szeged; Hispánia Kiadó, 2001. 121 p.
- Stációk. Erdély – Európa – Latin-Amerika. Tudományos konferencia Wittman Tibor professzor születésének 75. évfordulóján; összeáll. Anderle Ádám, szerk. Anderle Ádám, Nagy Marcel; Hispánia, Szeged, 1999
- Tanulmányok a Latin-amerikai magyar emigráció történetéből. Szeged; Hispánia Kiadó, 1999. 93 p. ISBN 963-85831-9-3
- Investigaciones sobre América Latina. Informe para la Asamblea General de CEISAL. México, 1999.
- Kozári Mónika társszerzővel: Un Húngaro en el México Revolucionario: Kálmán Kánya Ministro del Imperio Austro-Húngaro en México durante la Revolución Mexicana y la Primera Guerra Mundial. Mexico City: EDAMEX, 1999. 220 p. ISBN 970-661-082-0

=== Books ===
- Latin-Amerika. A függetlenség útjai- Bicentenario, 1810-2010; Anderle, Ádám; (ed.) 2. bőv. kiad.; SZTE, Szeged, 2012
- A magyar tudományos diákköri konferenciák története, 1951-2011; összeáll., szerk. Anderle Ádám; Országos Tudományos Diákköri Tanács, Bp., 2011
- Latin-Amerika története. Szeged: JATEPress Kiadó, 2010. 179 p. ISBN 978-963-315-001-6
- La mirada húngara. Ensayos sobre la historia de España y de América Latina Szeged: Szegedi Tudományegyetem, 2010. 217 p. ISBN 978 963 306 008 7
- A magyar-spanyol kapcsolatok ezer éve. Szeged: Szegedi Egyetemi Kiadó, 2006. 208 p. ISBN 963-7356-28-2
- Latin-Amerikai utakon. Szeged: Hispánia Kiadó, 2002. 162 p. ISBN 9638626402
- Spanyolország messzire van? Szeged: Hispánia Kiadó, 2000. 134 pp.
- Horváth Gyula társszerzővel: Perón – Che Guevara. Budapest; Pannonica Kiadó, 2000. 342 p. ISBN 9639252077
