= Magyar Tudomány =

Magyar Tudomány (Hungarian pronunciation: [ˈmɒɟɒr ˈtudomaːɲ], Hungarian: Hungarian Science) is the official monthly science magazine of the Hungarian Academy of Sciences. It publishes short articles on various new scientific developments as well as on problems of scientific life. Most articles are written by members of the academy. It has appeared continuously since 1840, under various names: Académiai Értesítő (1840—1859), Magyar Akadémiai Értesítő (1860—1867), A Magyar Tudományos Akadémia értesítője (1867—1889), Akadémiai Értesítő (1890—1955), Magyar Tudomány (since 1956). The editor-in-chief is Enikő Bollobás.
