= László Szarka =

Hungarian historian

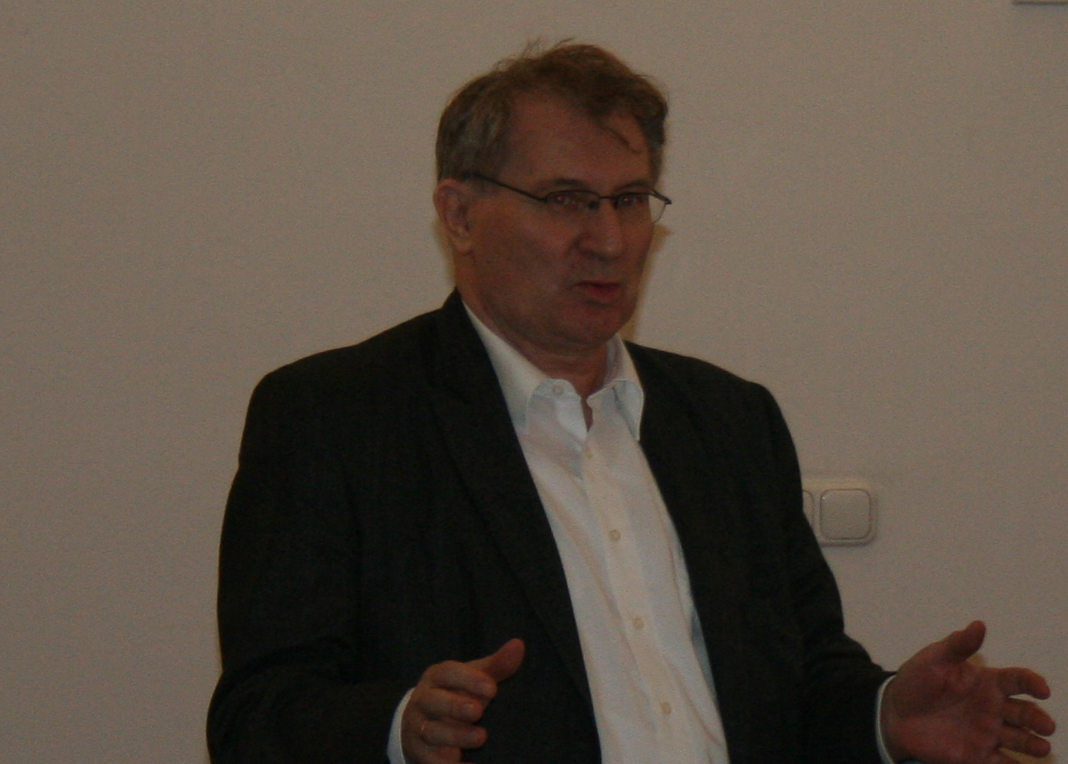
Szarka in 2016

László Szarka (*1953 in Galanta, Czechoslovakia) is a Hungarian historian.

Szarka studied at the Faculty of Philosophy of the Comenius University in Bratislava; worked at the Institute of Historical Studies of the Slovak Academy of Sciences (SAS); in 1977 he was sent to Budapest to the single-post branch of the SAS.

In 1978 Szarka applied for Hungarian citizenship and got employed in the Committee on History at the Hungarian Academy of Sciences (HAS); he became the director of the Research Institute of Ethnic and National Minorities at HAS after the institute was founded in 2001.

An interview with Szarka (in Hungarian).

== Work ==
- Szlovákok története (The History of Slovaks) (Bereményi könyvkiadó Budapest 199?)
- Szlovák nemzeti fejlõdés - magyar nemzetiségi politika 1867-1918 (Slovak National Development and the Nationalist Policy of the Hungarian Empire) (Kalligram Bratislava 1995)
- Duna-táji dilemmák. Nemzeti kisebbségek - kisebbségi politika a 20. századi Kelet-Közép-Európában (Dilemmas from the Danube, National Minorities - Minority Politics in the Central and Eastern Europe of the 20th Century) (Budapest 1998)
- Edvard Beneš elnöki dekrétumairól (Of the Presidential Decrees of Edvard Beneš) (História 2/2002)
