= Sándor Csernus =

Hungarian historian

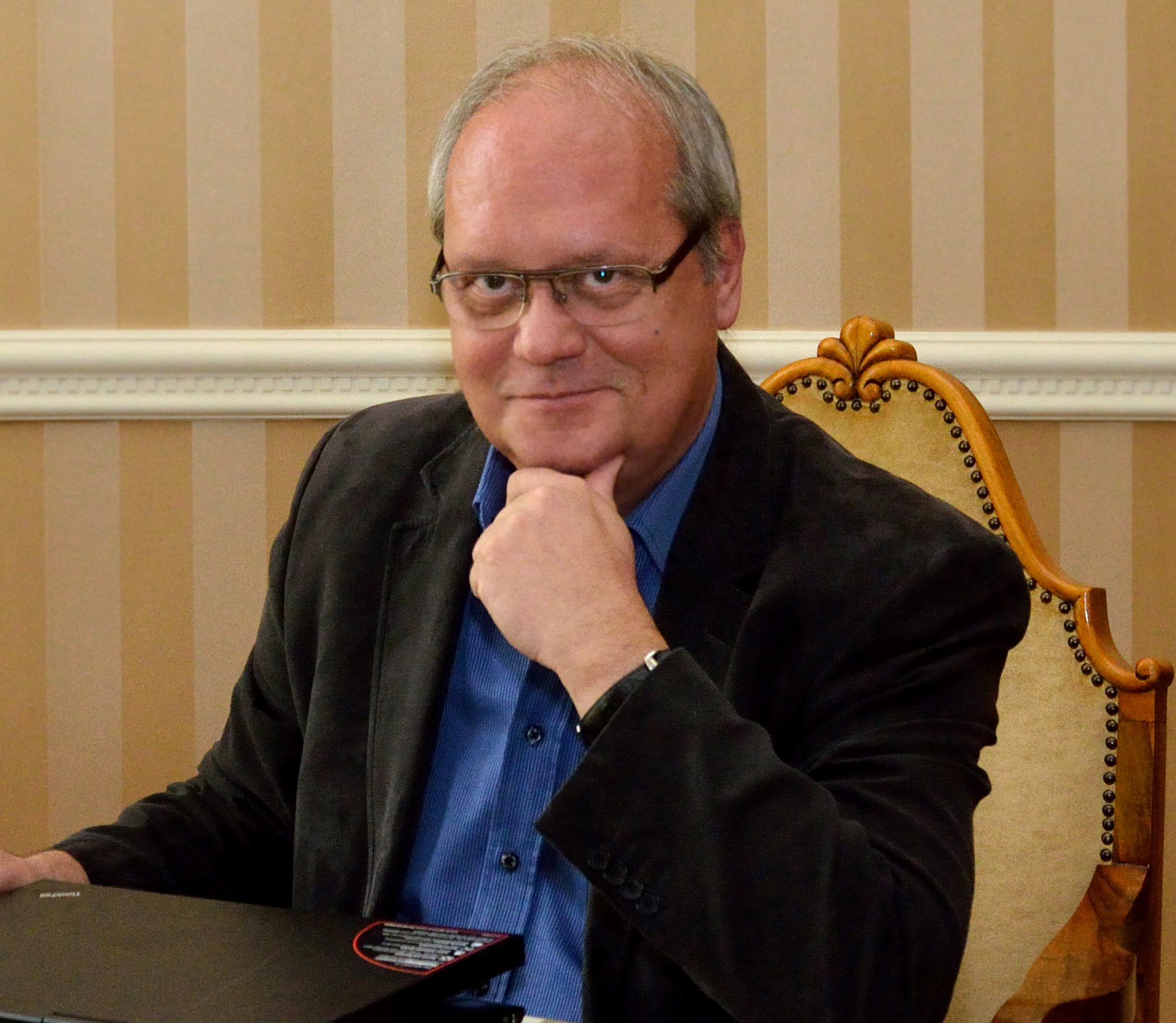
- Born: 21 March 1950 (age 76); Algyő, Hungary
- Citizenship: Hungarian
- Education: Attila József University
- Known for: Medieval history History of franco-hungarian relations
- Awards: Knight in the Order of Legion of Honour (2011)
- Scientific career
- Fields: Connections between French historiography and state theory: 13th–16th centuries History of franco-hungarian relations: 13th−18th centuries Hungarians and Europe, hungarian integration into Europe (Middle Ages and modern history) the idea of Europe through history Cultural politics in France and in Hungary; Modernisation of higher education
- Workplaces: University of Szeged; Hungarian Institute of Paris (Balassi Institute); University of Angers; University Lyon III

Sándor Csernus (Hungarian: [ˈʃaːndor ˈt͡ʃɛrnuʃ]; born 21 March 1950) is a Hungarian historian, associate professor (docent, reader), diplomat, former dean of Faculty of Arts, University of Szeged and director of the Hungarian Institute of Paris. He is fluent in Hungarian and French.

== Biography and career ==
Sándor Csernus was born on 21 March 1950 in Algyő. He took M. A. degrees at the Attila József University, Faculty of Arts in French and History in 1975.

== Committee Memberships ==
- SZÁZADOK (Member of the Scientific Redaction − since 2017
- dean of Faculty of Arts, University of Szeged − 2008÷2014
- Council of the Regional Centre of the Hungarian Academy of Sciences (member) and President of Commission (Szeged) ÷ since 2014
- Director for International Relations, Balassi Institute (Budapest) − 2006−2008
- Responsible for the Center of European Studies (PHARE programme) − 1997−1999
- Coordinator of the international cooperation of the University of Szeged − 1994−1999
- Founding member, Alliance Française of Szeged, (2007−2017, President) − since 1994
- Member of the editorial staff of the “Cahier d’Etudes Hongroises” (Co-editor since 1999) − 1990−2005
- Member of a dozen of national and international scientific societies and associations (history, philology, e.g. International *Society for Hungarian Philology, Hungarian Society for Medieval Studies, Society of Travel Studies) − since 1985
- Translation of French texts of the Middle Ages and about the Middle Ages (e.g. Robert de Clari, Joinville, Philippe de Commynes) − since 1981
- Writing of cartoon scenarios, contribution to the filming of documentaries on history − since 1979
- Organisation of symposiums on the national and international levels Participation to about thirty symposiums in Hungary and abroad − since 1975
- Preparation and writing of bibliographies, lists of sources, translations − since 1975
- Project manager in the Tempus, Phare and Socrates programmes dealing with the modernisation of higher education − 1996−1999
- Various academic responsibilities (Chief of department, vice-director of the Institute of History, member of the Senate) − 1979−1999
- Co-founder and chief editor of the history review “AETAS” ÷ 1973−1981

== Awards and honors ==
- Knight in the Order of Academic Palms (French decoration) − 1998
- Officer in the Order of Arts and Letters (French decoration) − 2001
- Officer in the National Order of Merit (French decoration) − 2001
- Pro Urbe Szeged − 2002
- Cross of Knight in the Hungarian Order of Merit − 2006
- Knight in the Order of Legion of Honour (French decoration) − 2011

== Bibliography ==
- Gálffy, László & Sáringer, János (eds.) (2015). Fehér Lovag: tanulmányok Csernus Sándor 65. születésnapjára (White Knight: Papers On Sándor Csernus's 65th Birthday (PDF) (in Hungarian). Szeged: Lazi Könyvkiadó; SZTE BTK Középkori Egyetemes Történeti Tanszék. ISBN 978 963 267 270 0

== Selected works ==
=== Papers ===
- Csernus, Sándor: From the Arsenal of Sigismund's Diplomacy: Universalism versus Sovereignty, In: Bárány, Attila Pál (ed.): Das Konzil von Konstanz und Ungarn. Debrecen: MTA, 2016. pp. 9−32. = Memoria Hungariae; 1.)
- Csernus, Sándor: La Hongrie de Mathias Corvin, In: Jean-François Maillard, István Monok, Donatella Nebbiai (eds.): Matthias Corvin, les bibliothèques princières et la genèse de l’état moderne. Budapest: Országos Széchényi Könyvtár (OSZK), 2009. pp. 13–24. = Supplementum Corvinianum; 2.)
- Csernus, Sándor: La Hongrie des Anjou, In: Guy Le Goff, Francesco Aceto (eds.): L'Europe des Anjou: Aventure des princes angevins du XIIIe au XVe siécle. Paris: Somogy éditions d'art, 2001. pp. 154–168.
- Csernus, Sándor: La Hongrie et les Hongrois dans la littérature chevaleresque française, In: Coulet, N (ed.): La noblesse dans les territoires angevins à la fin du Moyen Age: actes du colloque international : Angers-Saumur, 3-4 juin 1998. Roma: École Francaise de Rome, 2000. pp. 717–735. = Collection de l'École Francaise de Rome; 275.)
- Csernus, Sándor: Les Hongrie, les Français et les premières croisades, In: Sándor Csernus, Klára Korompay (eds.): Les Hongrois et l'Europe: Conquête et intégration. Paris; Szeged: Institut Hongrois de Paris; JATE, 1999. pp. 411–426. = Publications de l'Institut hongrois de Paris

=== Books ===
- Clari, Robert (2013). Konstantinápoly hódoltatása (PDF) (in Hungarian). A középkori francia történeti irodalom remekei I., translator: Csernus, Sándor. Budapest: Balassi Kiadó; SZTE BTK Középkori Egyetemes Történeti Tanszék.
- Joinville, Jean de (2015). Szent Lajos élete és bölcs mondásai (in Hungarian). A középkori francia történeti irodalom remekei II., translator: Csernus, Sándor. Budapest: Balassi Kiadó; SZTE BTK Középkori Egyetemes Történeti Tanszék.
