= Olià =

- Village
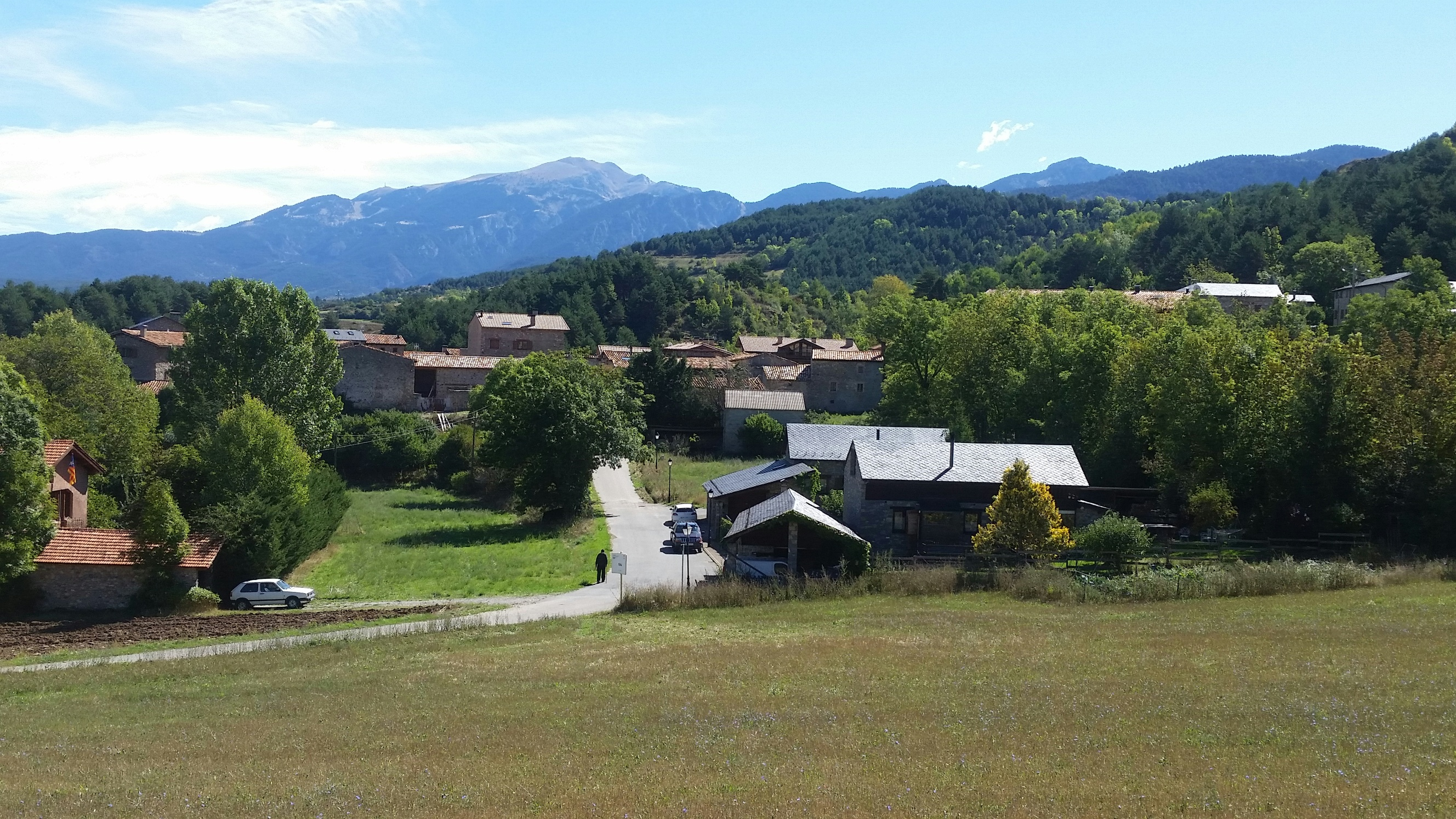
- Interactive map of Olià
- Coordinates: 42°21′18″N 1°44′36″E
- Country: Spain
- Autonomous community: Catalonia
- Province: Lleida
- Vegueria: Alt Pirineu i Aran
- Comarca: Cerdanya
- Municipality: Bellver de Cerdanya
- Elevation: 1,080 m (3,540 ft)

Population (2018)
  - Total: 14
- Demonym(s): Olianenc, Olianenca
- Time zone: UTC+1 (CET)
  - Summer (DST): UTC+2 (CEST)
- Postal code: 25721
- Linguistic Predominance: Catalan

Olià is located 1080 m and is a small village belonging to the municipality of Bellver de Cerdanya, in the comarca of la Cerdanya, vegueria of Alt Pirineu i Aran, province of Lleida, Catalonia, Spain. It has a population of 38 (census, 2025).

Olià, Nas and Santa Eugènia de Nerellà, were and they are brother towns, Santa Eugènia has a church and a cemetery and Olià had a school called l'estudi. These three fraternals towns celebrate their town celebration on the third Sunday of October.

== Location ==
Olià is located at the foot of Serrat de Nas, next to the village of Santa Eugènia de Nerellà and opposite of the Cadí-Moixeró Natural Park.

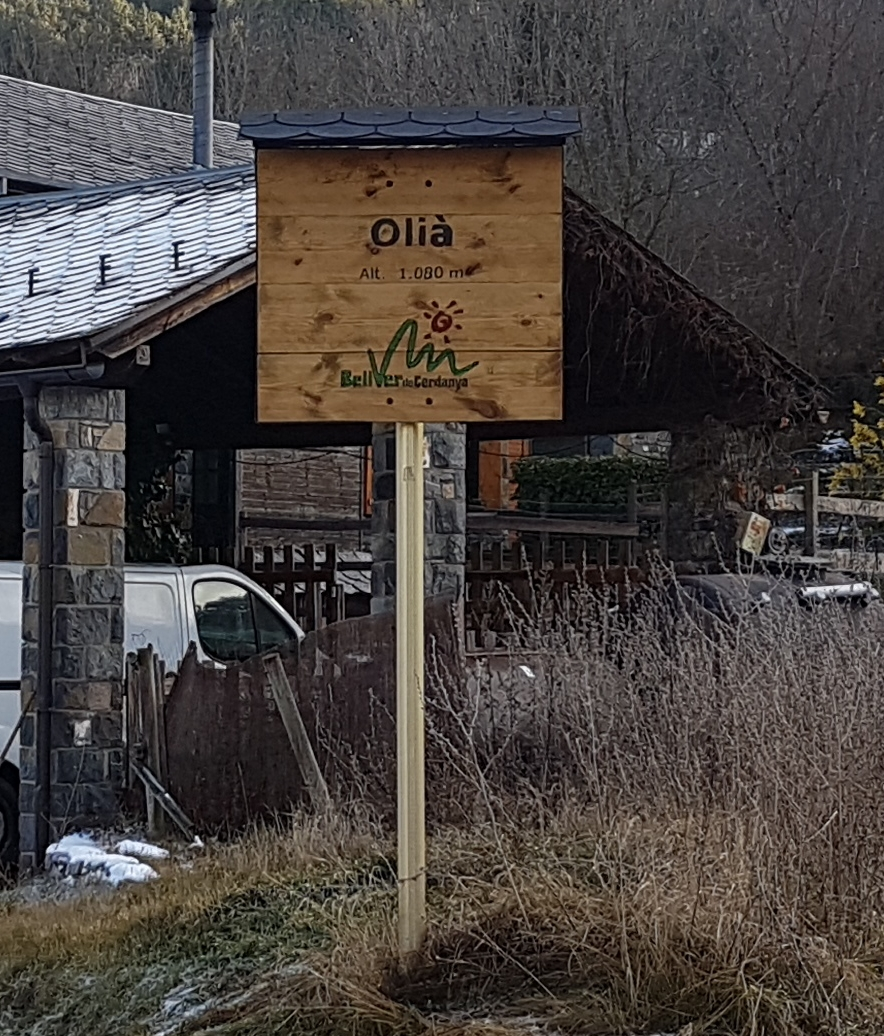
Olià

=== How to get to Olià? ===
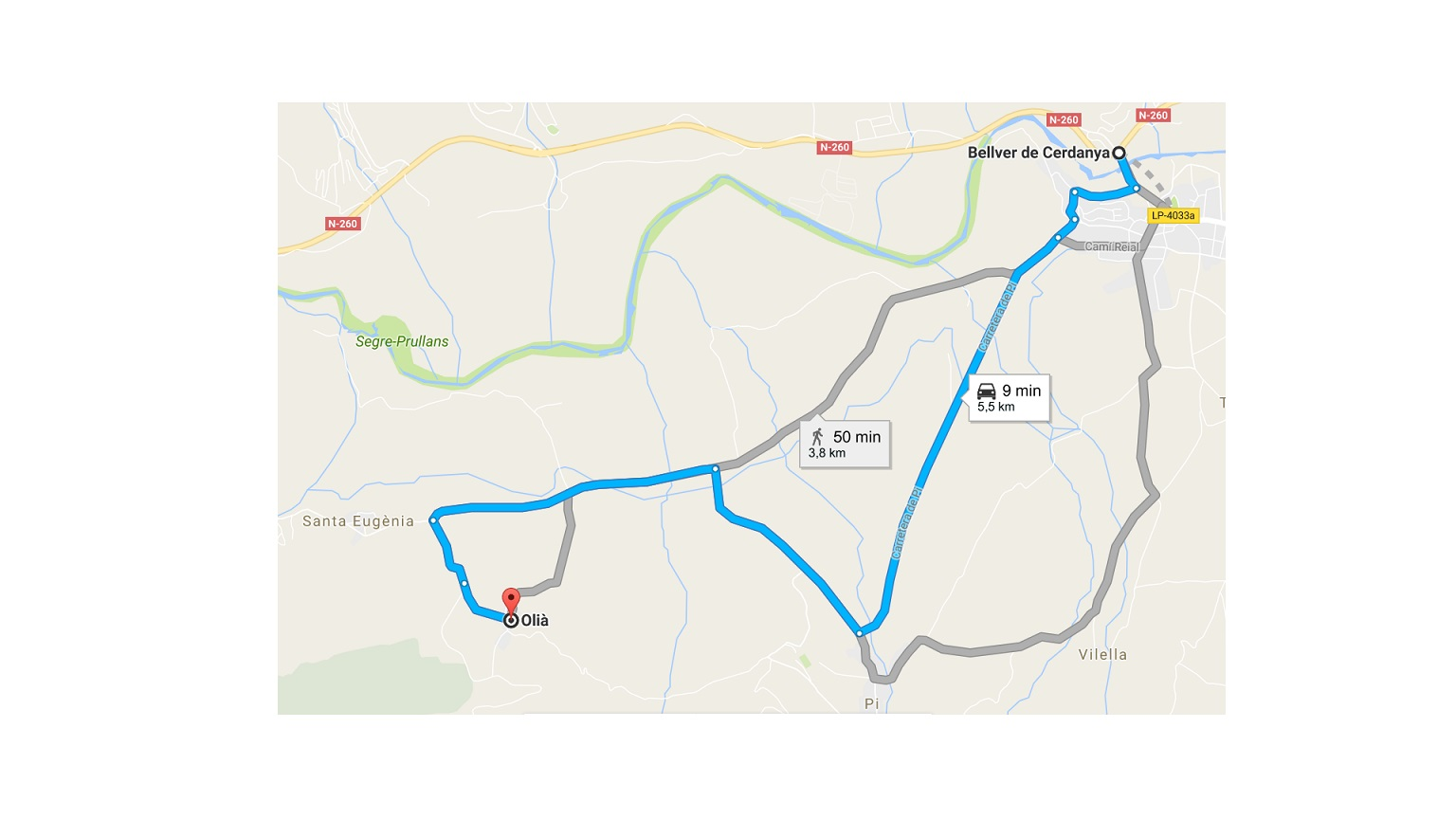
How to get to Olià?

== Population ==
In 2019, the population was 14 people of which eight were men and six women.

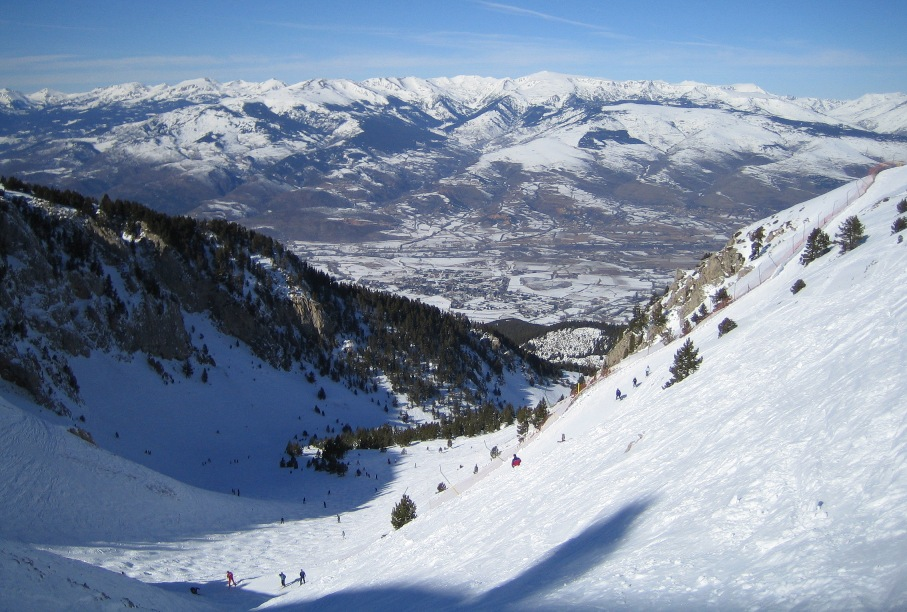
La Masella (Cerdanya)

== Places of interest ==
=== Church of Santa Eugènia de Nerellà ===
Because Olià does not have any church, people of the town depend of the Church of Santa Eugènia, where they also have their cemetery.

=== Ski resorts ===
In La Cerdanya there are two alpine ski resorts (Masella and La Molina) and three of Nordic skiing (Guils Fontanera, Lles, Aransa). Moreover, areas like Alp 2500, which connects the Masella and La Molina stations, offer the most important ski area of the Pyrenees with an area of 121 kilometers of slopes.

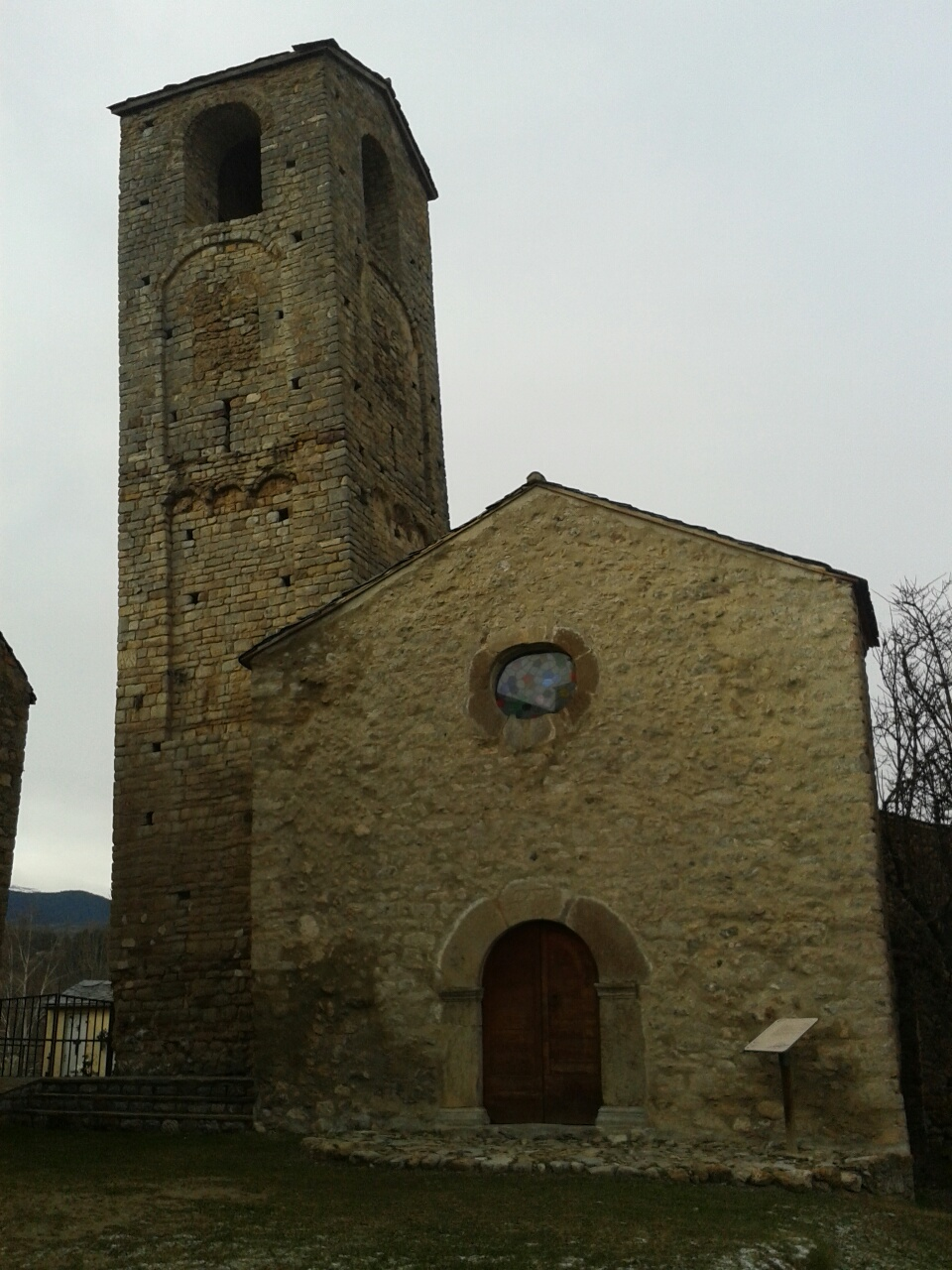
Church of Santa Eugènia

== Routes ==
The Route of the Reapers (La Ruta dels Segadors in Catalan) is a very old way, which runs through the Cadí-Moixeró Natural Park.

== See also ==
- Bellver de Cerdanya
- Cadí-Moixeró Natural Park
