= Santa Eugenia =

Santa Eugenia (Spanish) and Santa Eugènia (Catalan) may refer to:

- Santa Eugènia de Berga, municipality in the comarca of Osona in Catalonia, Spain
- Santa Eugenia (Madrid), administrative neighborhood (barrio) of Madrid, Spain
- Santa Eugènia, Mallorca, small municipality in the comarca of Pla de Mallorca, Spain
- Santa Eugènia de Nerellà, hamlet in the municipality of Bellver de Cerdanya, Catalonia, Spain

== See also ==
- Saint Eugenia
