= Kortas =

Kortas may refer to:

- Kortaş, Ergani, village in Diyarbakır Province, Turkey
- Ken Kortas (1942–2022), American football player

== See also ==
- Korta, village in Pali district, Rajasthan, India
- Cortas (disambiguation)
