= Cortas =

Cortas may refer to:

- Cortàs, locality in Province of Lleida, Catalonia, Spain
- Wadad Makdisi Cortas (1909–1979), Lebanese educator and writer

== See also ==
- Kortas (disambiguation)
