= Talló =

- Locality
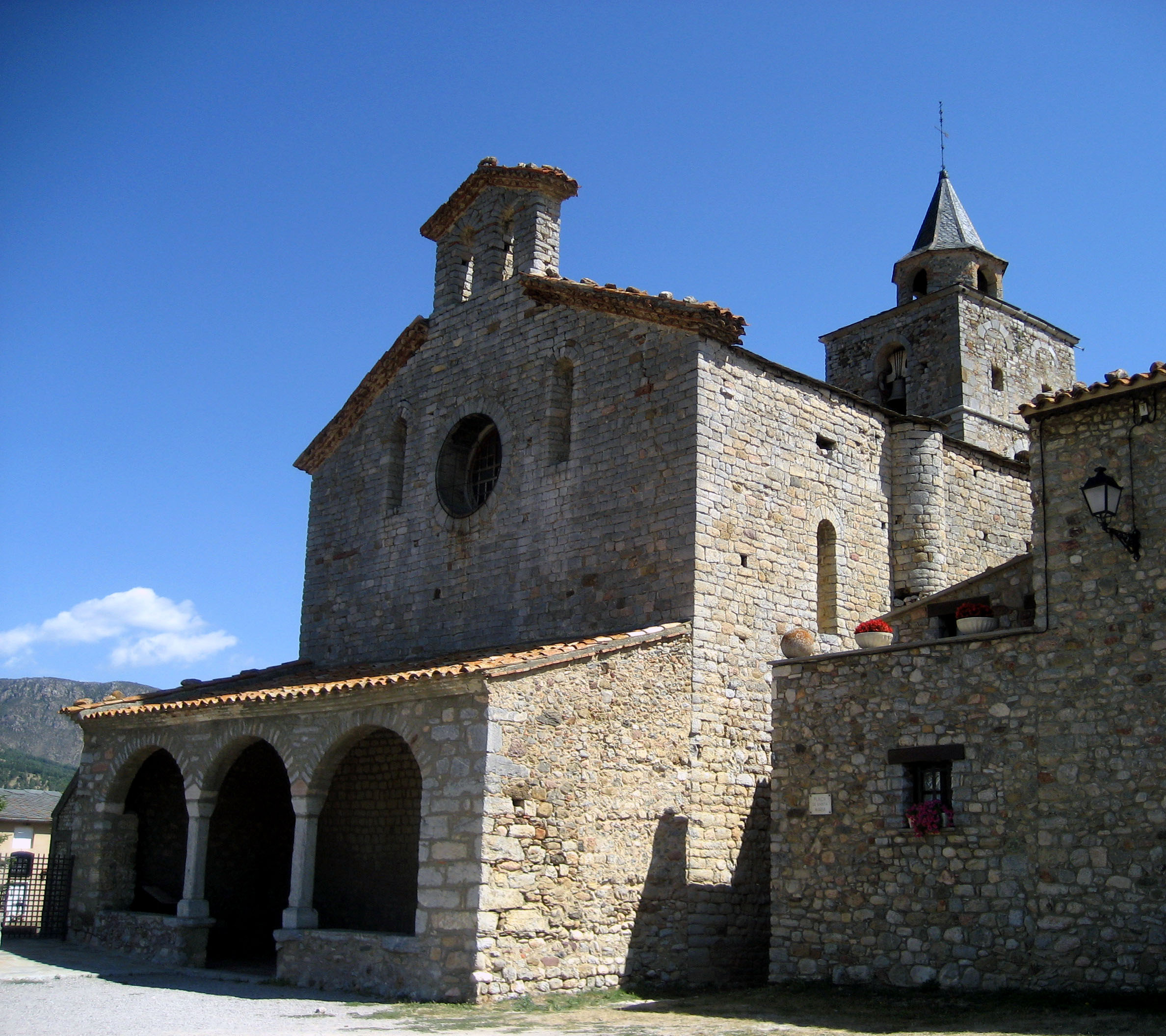

- Location within Province of Lleida Location within Catalonia Location within Spain
- Coordinates: 42°21′48″N 1°46′51″E
- Country: Spain
- Community: Catalonia
- Province: Lleida
- Municipality: Bellver de Cerdanya
- Elevation: 1,058 m (3,471 ft)

Population
  - Total: 35

Talló is a locality located in the municipality of Bellver de Cerdanya, in Province of Lleida province, Catalonia, Spain. As of 2020, it has a population of 35.

== Geography ==
Talló is located 206km northeast of Lleida.
