= Ordèn =

- Locality
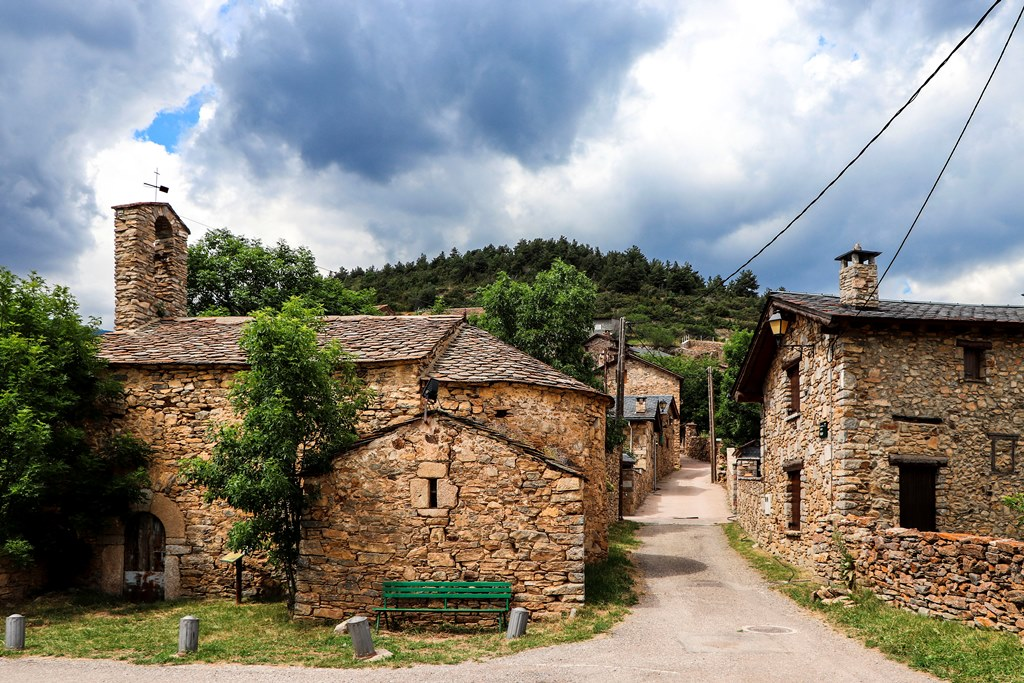

- Location within Province of Lleida Location within Catalonia Location within Spain
- Coordinates: 42°24′6″N 1°46′25″E
- Country: Spain
- Community: Catalonia
- Province: Lleida
- Municipality: Bellver de Cerdanya
- Elevation: 1,482 m (4,862 ft)

Population
  - Total: 5

Ordèn is a locality located in the municipality of Bellver de Cerdanya, in Province of Lleida province, Catalonia, Spain. As of 2020, it has a population of 5.

== Geography ==
Ordèn is located 212km northeast of Lleida.
