= Éller =

- Locality
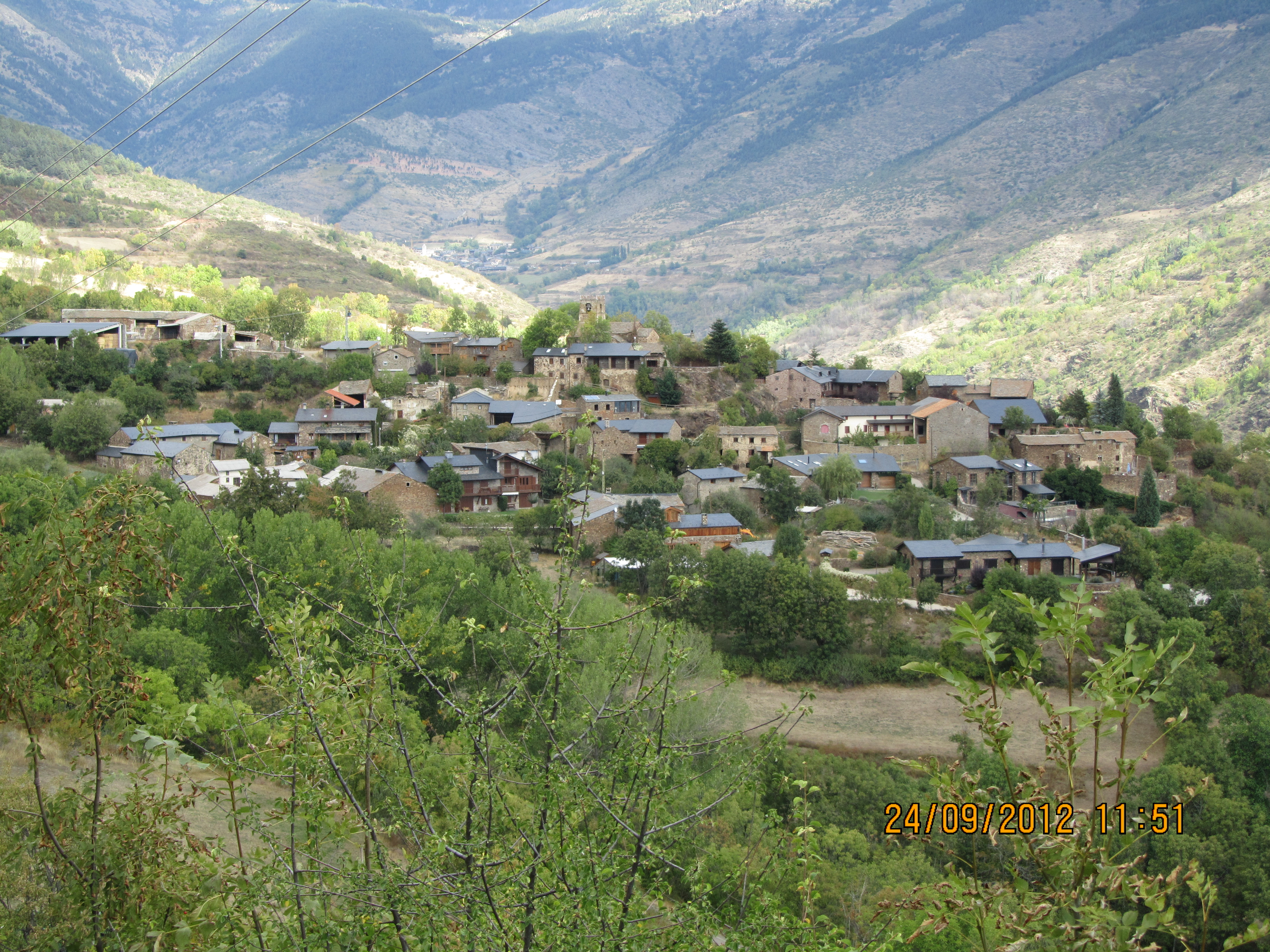

- Location within Province of Lleida Location within Catalonia Location within Spain
- Coordinates: 42°24′59″N 1°47′33″E
- Country: Spain
- Community: Catalonia
- Province: Lleida
- Municipality: Bellver de Cerdanya
- Elevation: 1,429 m (4,688 ft)

Population
  - Total: 19

Éller is a small village and locality located in the municipality of Bellver de Cerdanya, in Province of Lleida province, Catalonia, Spain.It is known for its scenic location in the Pyrenees and its traditional rural architecture.

== Geography ==
Éller is located 213 km northeast of Lleida. Éller lies at an elevation of approximately 1,423 meters (4,669 feet) above sea level, nestled in the foothills of the Pyrenean mountain range. The village is characterized by its mountainous landscape, natural beauty, and proximity to hiking trails and outdoor recreational areas. It is located around 10 kilometers from the town of Bellver de Cerdanya.

== Demographics ==
Éller is a very small settlement with a minimal permanent population.Detailed census information is limited due to its size, but it is considered one of the smaller nuclei within the municipality of Bellver de Cerdanya. As of 2020, it has a population of 19.

== History and Heritage ==
The village of Éller features traditional stone houses and rural Catalan architecture.One notable landmark is the Church of Santa Eulàlia d’Éller, a Romanesque church dating back to the medieval period.
