= Alp 2500 =

Ski resort in Catalonia, Spain

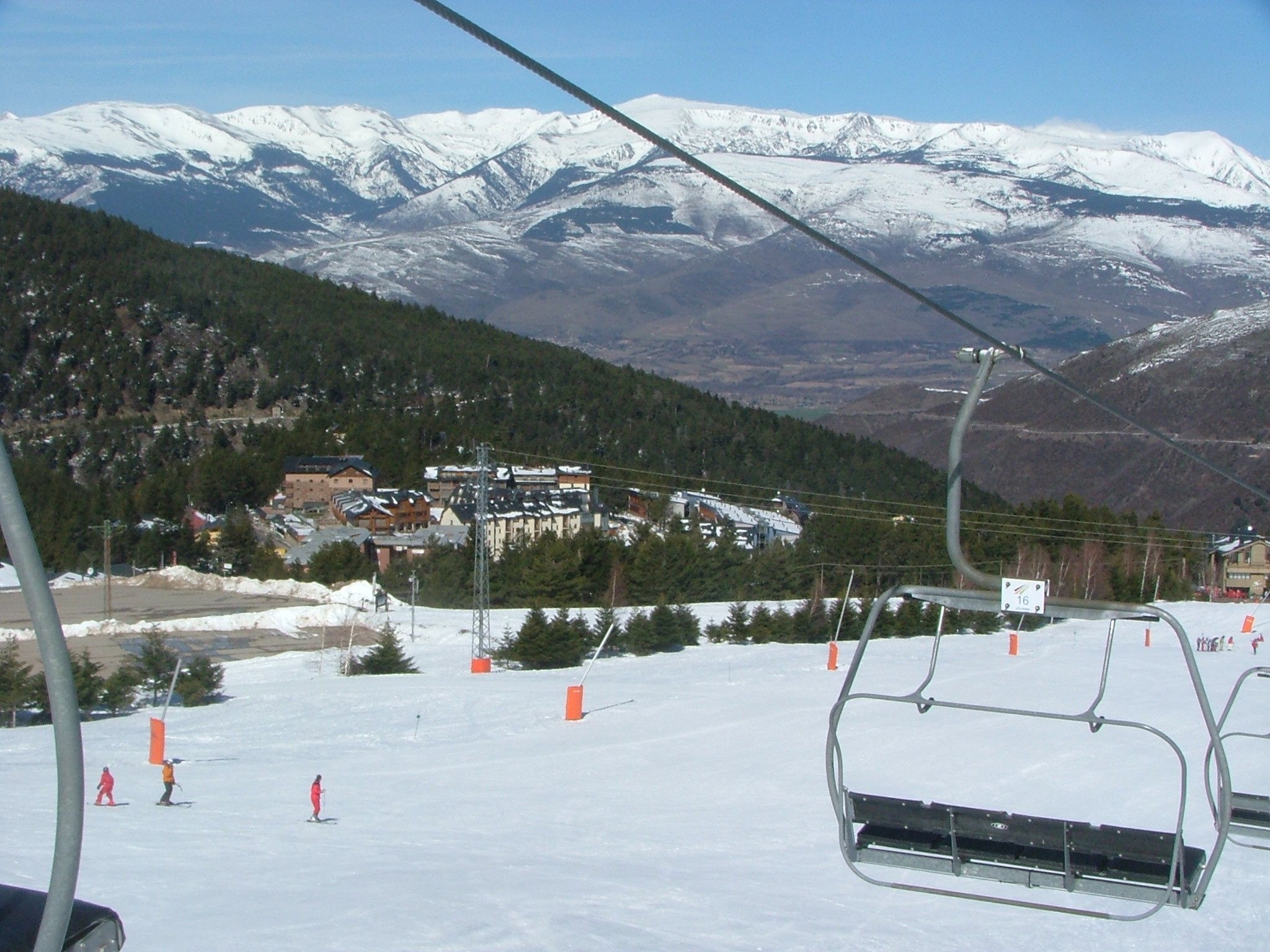
- La Molina ski resort

- Location within Spain Location within Catalonia Location within Pyrenees
- Location: Pyrenees mountains, Catalonia, Spain
- Nearest major city: Barcelona
- Coordinates: 42°20′37″N 1°57′22″E
- Vertical: 935 m (3,068 ft)
- Top elevation: 2,535 m (8,317 ft)
- Base elevation: 1,600 m (5,200 ft)
- Trails: 131
- Longest run: 9 km (5.6 mi)
- Total length: 145 km (90 mi)
- Website: Alp 2500

Alp 2500 is a ski resort in La Cerdanya, Catalonia, in the Pyrenees mountains of northeastern Spain. It includes the two towns of La Molina and Masella, whose two respective ski areas united to form this resort. The nearest main town is Alp. The resort of Masella serves the mountain of La Tosa.

Alp 2500 has over 130 km (80 mi.) of slopes, and its Hotel Alp is only 50 meters (165 ft.) from the slopes.

La Molina hosted World Cup alpine events in December 2008 (women's technical events) and the FIS Snowboarding World Championships in January 2011.
