= Saint Eugenia =

Saint Eugenia may refer to:

- Eugenia of Rome (died c. 258), early Christian martyr
- Eugenia of Alsace (died 735), abbess of Hohenburg

== See also ==
- Santa Eugenia
