= Hungarian raid in Spain =

Raid in AD 942

Coordinates: 41.4019°N 2.1714°E

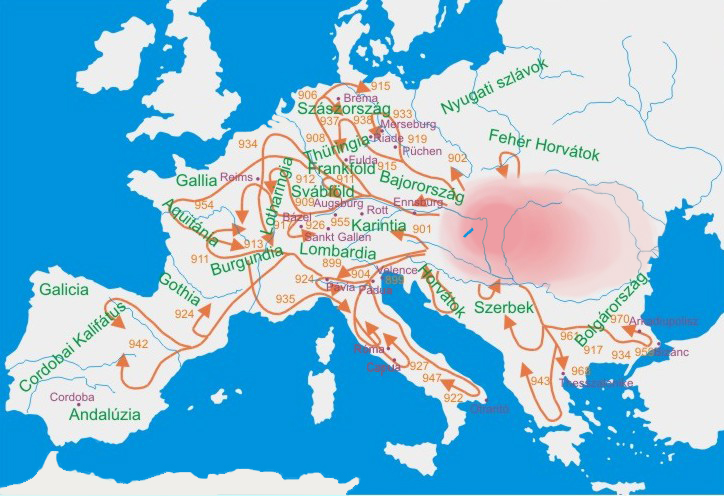
Map of the Hungarian invasions of Europe. Spain is on the lower left corner.

A Hungarian raid in Spain took place in July 942. This was the furthest west the Hungarians raided during the period of their migration into central Europe; although, in a great raid of 924–25, the Hungarians sacked Nîmes and may have got as far as the Pyrenees.

The only contemporary reference to the Hungarians crossing the Pyrenees into Spain is in al-Maʿsūdī, who wrote that "their raids extend to the lands of Rome and almost as far as Spain". The only detailed description of the raid of 942 was preserved by Ibn Ḥayyān in his Kitāb al-Muqtabis fī tarīkh al-Andalus (He Who Seeks Knowledge About the History of al-Andalus), which was finished shortly before his death in 1076. His account of the Hungarians relies on a lost tenth-century source. According to Ibn Ḥayyān, the Hungarian raiding party passed through the Kingdom of the Lombards (northern Italy) and then through southern France, skirmishing along the way. They then invaded Thaghr al-Aqṣā ("Furthest March"), the northwestern frontier province of the Caliphate of Córdoba. On 7 July 942, the main army began the siege of Lleida (Lérida). The cities of Lleida, Huesca and Barbastro were all ruled by members of the Banū Ṭawīl family. The first two were ruled by Mūsa ibn Muḥammad, while Barbastro was under the control of his brother, Yaḥyā ibn Muḥammad. While besieging Lleida, the Hungarian cavalry raided as far as Huesca and Barbastro, where they captured Yaḥyā in a skirmish on 9 July.

The one who reported their matters said that their land is in the far east, and that the Pechenegs neighbour them to the east, that the land of Rome is in the direction of Mecca from them, and that the land of Constantinople is a little bit off to the east from them. To their north is the city of Moravia and the other cities of the Slavs. To the west of them are the Saxons and the Franks. To get to the land of Andalusia they traversed a long distance [a part of which is] desert ... Their way during their march crossed Lombardy, which borders them. There is a distance of eight days between them and Lombardy. Their dwelling places are on the Danube River and they are nomads as the Arabs without towns and houses living in felt tents in scattered halting-places ... (Note: Zimonyi 2004, p. 29: "Those who know their affairs mentioned that their country lies in the far East. The Pechenegs live east of them and they are their neighbors. The land of Rome lies south of them. The town of Constantinople lies deviating a little from the direction to the east. The town of Murāwa [Moravia] and the rest of the Slavic countries lie north of them. The Saxons and the Franks are west of them. They covered a long distance to the land of Andalusia ... Their way during their march crossed Lombardia, which borders them. There is a distance of eight days between them and it [Lombardia]. Their dwelling places are on the Danube River and they are nomads as the Arabs without towns and houses living in felt tents in scattered halting-places.") (Note: Schamiloglu 1984, p. 216: "The one who reported their matters said that their land is in the far east, and that the Pechenegs [Bacanāk] neighbour them to the east, that the land of Rūma is in the direction of qibla [i.e., Mecca] from them, and that the land of Constantinople is a little bit off to the east from them. To their north is the city of Morava [Marāwa] and the other cities of the Slavs [Ṣaqāliba]. To the west of them are the Saxons [ṢXṢNṢ] and the Franks [Ifranca]. To get to the land of Andalusia they traversed a long distance [a part of which is] desert ...") proceeding from the Frankish country, after defeating whomever they found during their passage, attaining the height before Lérida, at the extreme end of the March, on Thursday, ten nights remaining in the month of sawwal; the advances of their cavalry put them in the plain of the valley of Ena, Cerratania and the city of Huesca; and on Saturday, the third day of their encampment, they made captive Yaḥyā ibn Muḥammad ibn aṭ-Ṭawīl, lord of Barbastro. (Note: ... procedentes del país franco, tras derrotar a quienes hallaron a su paso, haciendo alto frente a Lérida, extremo de la Marca, el jueves, quedando 10 noches de sawwal (7 de julio de 942); las avanzas de su caballería se metieron por el llano hasta Wadina, Cerretanía y la ciudad de Huesca; y el sábado, tercer día de su acampada, hicieron cautivo a Yaḥyā ibn Muḥammad ibn aṭ-Ṭawīl, señor de Barbastro.)

Ibn Ḥayyān also names seven Hungarian "leaders"—the word amīr being a generic term for a ruler or governor: "They possessed seven chieftains. Among these the greatest in dignity was called Djila (Gyula). Ecser followed him, after him Bulcsudi, then Bašman, Alpár, Glad and lastly Harhadi." (Note: Pertenecieron a siete jefes [umaraʾ]. Entre éstos el mayor de dignidad se llamaba Dyila. Le seguía Ečer, (después) l·ḥ·w·d·y, (luego) Bosmān, l·x·s, ʿx·w·d y (por fin) ḥ·d·ḥ·d·y.) It has been proposed that these were the commanders of the seven contingents that made up the invading army, but it is far more likely that Ibn Ḥayyān is merely recording the seven chieftains of the Hungarian tribes. He is perhaps relying on a Byzantine source. In later tradition, Alpár and Glad were remembered as defeated enemies of the Hungarians. György Györffy argues that a "reshuffling of power" after 942 caused them to be remembered this way.

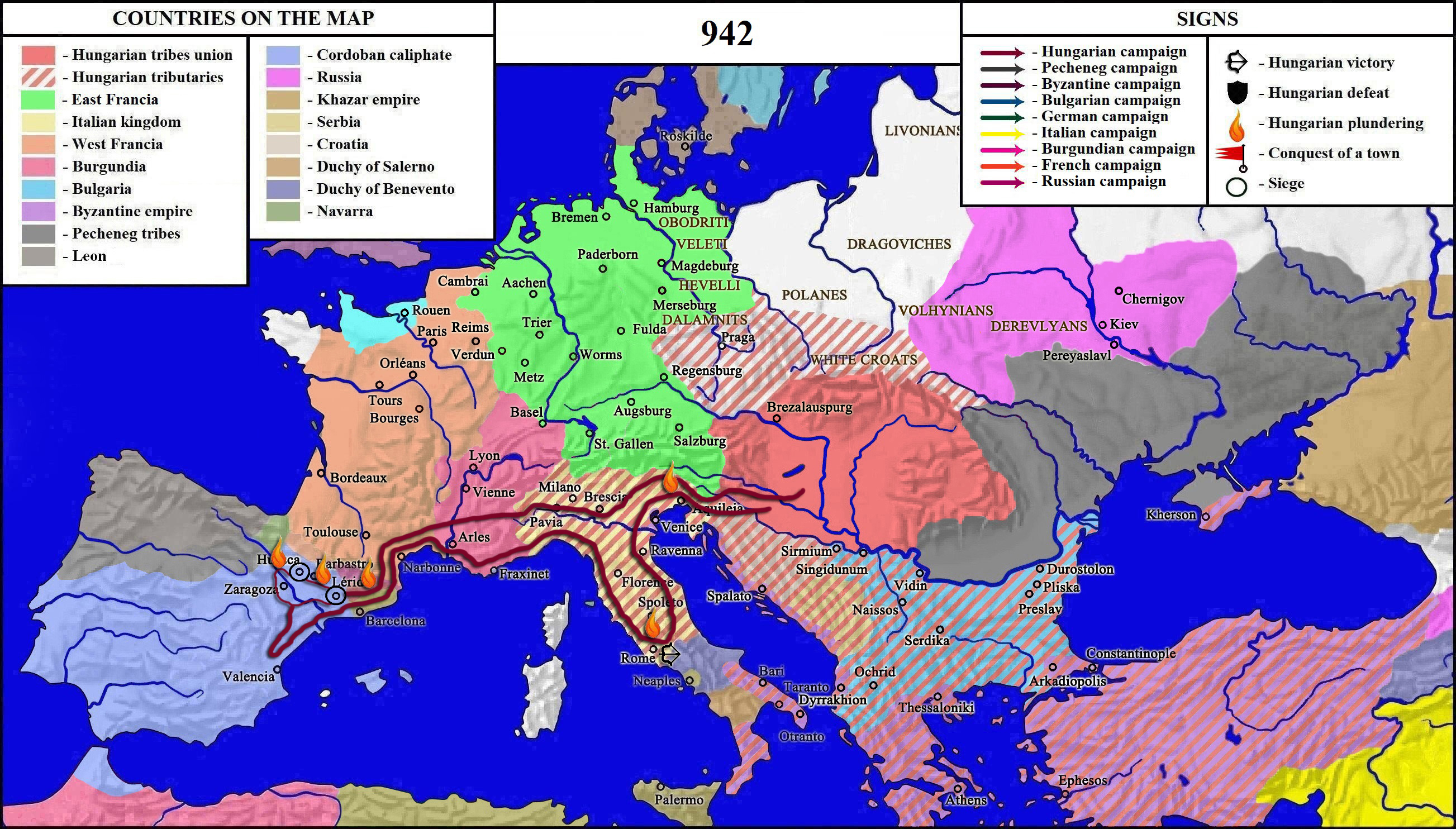
The Hungarian campaign in Italy, Burgundy, Southern France and Spain in 942.

The information about the location of Hungary, its leaders and the route of the invading army may have come from five captured Hungarians who, according to Ibn Ḥayyān, converted to Islam and were incorporated into the caliphal guard. Yaḥyā paid a large ransom and was released on 27 July. He subsequently went to Córdoba to do homage to Caliph ʿAbd ar-Rahmān III an-Nasir:

Afterwards they [the captives] became Muslims and he included them in his service. From far Tortosa came notice on the first day of the month of muḥarram the following year 331 (Note: The year given here is the anno Hegirae.) [14 September 942] of the rescue of Yaḥyā ibn Muḥammad ibn aṭ-Ṭawīl from the hands of these Turks through a large sum that he paid them, with which God relieved his situation on Wednesday, the tenth of ḏū l-qaʿdah [27 July 942], [after which] he went to the capital to renew his homage to an-Nasir. (Note: Posteriormente se hicieron musulmanes y los incluyó en su servidumbre. De la extrema Tortosa llegaron noticias a primeros de muḥarram del siguiente año 331 (14 septiembre 942) del rescate de Yaḥyā ibn Muḥammad ibn aṭ-Ṭawīl de manos de estos turcos (at-Turk) mediante una suma que se les pagó, con lo que Dios alivió su situación, el miércoles, 10 de ḏū l-qaʿdah (27 julio 942), dirigiéndose a la capital, a renovar su homenaje an-Nasir.)

Lacking food stores and finding insufficient forage, the Hungarians retired after a few days. According to Ibn Ḥayyān, it was the news of the raids and the fear they spread among Muslims that inspired King Ramiro II of León to repudiate the treaty he had made with the caliph the year before (941):

When the enemy of God, Ramiro Ordóñez, learned of the appearance of the Turks in the march of Lérida and of the fear of the Muslims of that region, he endeavoured to profit—violating the promises that he had solemnly sworn before the bishops and monks, [thus] limiting the pretexts he could have before the dignitaries of his own religion—by sending the lord of Castile [Qaštlīya], Fernán González [Ibn Gundišalb], with a trained army in support of his son-in-law, García Sánchez, lord of Pamplona, in the war against the Muslims. (Note: Cuando el enemigo de Dios, Ramiro hijo de Ordoño, conoció la aparición de los turcos en la marca de Lérida y el pavor de los musulmanes de aquella zona, pretendió aprovecharse, violando las promesas a que se había comprometido solemnemente ante obispos y monjes, limitando los pretextos que podría tener ante los dignatarios de su religión, al enviar al señor de Castilla Fernán González con un nutrido ejército en apoyo de su yerno, García hijo de Sancho, señor de Pamplona en la guerra contra los musulmanes.)

In fact, Count Fernán González, who commanded the border region of Castile, was cooperating with King García Sánchez I of Pamplona in the latter's war with the Caliphate as early as April, months before the Hungarians' arrival. Ramiro's real motivation was probably to prevent a loss of face, since he was married to Urraca, García's sister.

Sometime between 939 and 943, Ermengol, the eldest son of Sunyer, Count of Barcelona, "died in battle at Baltarga childless" (apud Baltargam bello interfectus sine filio) according to the 12th-century Gesta Comitum Barchinonensium. The historian Albert Benet i Clará has suggested that this battle, which is otherwise unknown, must have been against the Hungarians.

== Bibliography ==
- Anderle, Ádám (1992). Kalandozók és zarándokok: magyar témák a középkori spanyol történelemben, historiográfiai vázlat [Pilgrims and Adventurers: Hungarian Themes in Medieval Spanish History, a Historiographical Sketch]. Szeged: JATE.
- Bakay, Kornél (2000). "Hungary". In Reuter, Timothy (ed.). The New Cambridge Medieval History, Volume 3, c.900–c.1024. Cambridge: Cambridge University Press. pp. 536–552. ISBN 978-1-13905572-7.
- Benet i Clará, Albert (1982a). "La incursió d'hongaresos a Catalunya l'any 942". Quaderns d'Estudis Medievals. 3 (9): 568–74.
- Benet i Clará, Albert (1982b). "La batalla de Balltarga: Epíleg de la incursió d'hongaresos a Catalunya l'any 942". Quaderns d'Estudis Medievals. 3 (10): 639–40.
- Chalmeta, Pedro (1975). "Treinta años de historia hispana: El tomo V del 'Muqtabas' de Ibn Ḥayyān". Hispania. 25: 665–76.
- Chalmeta, Pedro (1976). "La méditerranée occidentale et al-Andalus de 934 à 941: les donées d'Ibn Hayyan". Rivista degli studi orientali. 50: 337–51.
- Chalmeta, Pedro; Corriente, Federico; Sobh, M., eds. (1979). Al-Muqtabis V. Madrid: Instituto Hispano-Árabe de Cultura.
- Czeglédy, Károly (1979). "Új arab forrás a magyarok 942. évi spanyolországi kalandozásáról" [New Arabic Source on the Raid of the Magyars in Spain in 942]. Magyar Nyelv. 75: 273–85.
- Czeglédy, Károly (1981). "Még egyszer a magyarok 942. évi spanyolországi kalandozásáról" [Once Again on the Raid of the Magyars in Spain in 942]. Magyar Nyelv. 77: 419–23.
- Elter, István (1996). "A magyar kalandozáskor arab forrásai" [Arabic Sources on the Period of Magyar Raids]. In Kovács, L.; Veszprémy, L. (eds.). A honfoglaláskor írott forrásai. Budapest. pp. 174–79.
- Elter, István (1981). "Néhány megjegyzés Ibn Ḥayyānnak a magyarok 942. évi spanyolországi kalandozásáról" [Some Remarks of Ibn Hayyan on the Raid of the Magyars in Spain in 942]. Magyar Nyelv. 77: 413–19.
- Elter, István (1982–83). "Notas a propósito del relato de Ibn Hayyan sobre la incursión húngara por la Marca Septentrional en 924". Awraq: Estudios sobre el mundo árabe e islámico contemporáneo. 5–6: 141–48.
- Györffy, György (1994). "Dual Kingship and the Seven Chieftains of the Hungarians in the Era of the Conquest and the Raids". Acta Orientalia Academiae Scientiarum Hungaricae. 47 (1): 87–104.
- Gyula, Kristó, ed. (1995). A honfoglalás korának írott forrásai [Written Sources of the Era of the Conquest]. Szeged.
- Martínez Díez, Gonzalo (2005). El condado de Castilla, 711–1038: la historia frente a la leyenda. Marcial Pons Historia.
- Millàs Vallicrosa, Josep (1962). "Sobre las incursiones húngaras en la Cataluña condal". Homenaje a Johannes Vincke para el 11 de Mayo 1962 [Festschrift für Johannes Vincke zum 11. Mai 1962], vol. 1. Madrid. pp. 73–80.
- Róna-Tas, András (1999). Hungarians and Europe in the Early Middle Ages: An Introduction to Early Hungarian History. Budapest: Central European University Press.
- Schamiloglu, Uli (1984). "The Name of the Pechenegs in Ibn Ḥayyān's al-Muqtabas" (PDF). Journal of Turkish Studies / Türklük bilgisi araştırmaları. 8: 215–22.
- Szántó, Richard (1996). "Spanyolországi források a kalandozó magyarok 942. évi hadjáratáról" [Spanish Sources on the Campaign of the Raiding Magyars in 942]. Acta Universitas Szegediensis de Attila József Nominatae. Acta Historica. 103: 43–48.
- Ubieto Arteta, Antonio (1989). Orígenes de Aragón. Zaragoza: Anubar.
- Vallvé, Joaquín (1992). El Califato de Córdoba. Mapfre.
- Viguera Molins, María Jesús; Corriente, Federico, eds. (1981). Crónica del califa ʿAbdarrahmán III al-Nasir entre los años 912 y 942. Zaragoza: Anubar. (Translation of Chalmeta, Corriente and Sobh [1979].)
- Viguera Molins, María Jesús (1997). "La percepción de Europa desde el ámbito araboislámico". In Vaca Lorenzo, Ángel (ed.). Europa: Proyecciones y percepciones históricas. Ediciones Universidad Salamanca. pp. 49–70.
- Zimonyi, István (2004). "A New Muslim Source on the Hungarians in the Second Half of the Tenth Century". Chronica. 4: 22–31.
- Zimonyi, István (2016). Muslim Sources on the Magyars in the Second Half of the 9th Century: The Magyar Chapter of the Jayhānī Tradition. Leiden: Brill.
