= Baltarga =

Coordinates: 42°21′48″N 1°48′28″E

Baltarga (or Valltarga) is a village in the municipality of Bellver de Cerdanya located at 1,080 metres (3,540 ft) above sea level on the southern slope of a ridge of the same name, the Serrat de Baltarga. As of 2009 it had a population of 56.

In the early history of Catalonia, Baltarga was the site of two important battles. Sometime between 939 and 943, Ermengol, the eldest son of Sunyer, Count of Barcelona, "died in battle at Baltarga, childless" (apud Baltargam bello interfectus sine filio). It has been proposed that this battle was fought against raiding Magyars in 942. Then, in 1035, Count Berenguer Ramon I of Barcelona "died in battle at Baltarga in Cerdanya" (obiit in bello apud Baltargam locum Ceritaniae). The source for both battles is the 12th-century Gesta comitum Barchinonensium.

== Church ==
The parish church is Sant Andreu de Baltarga, originally built in 890. The church possesses a round apse. A painted wood altar frontal is preserved in the Museu Nacional d'Art de Catalunya, while some ceiling frescoes from the arches leading to the apse have been moved to the Museu Diocesà d'Urgell.

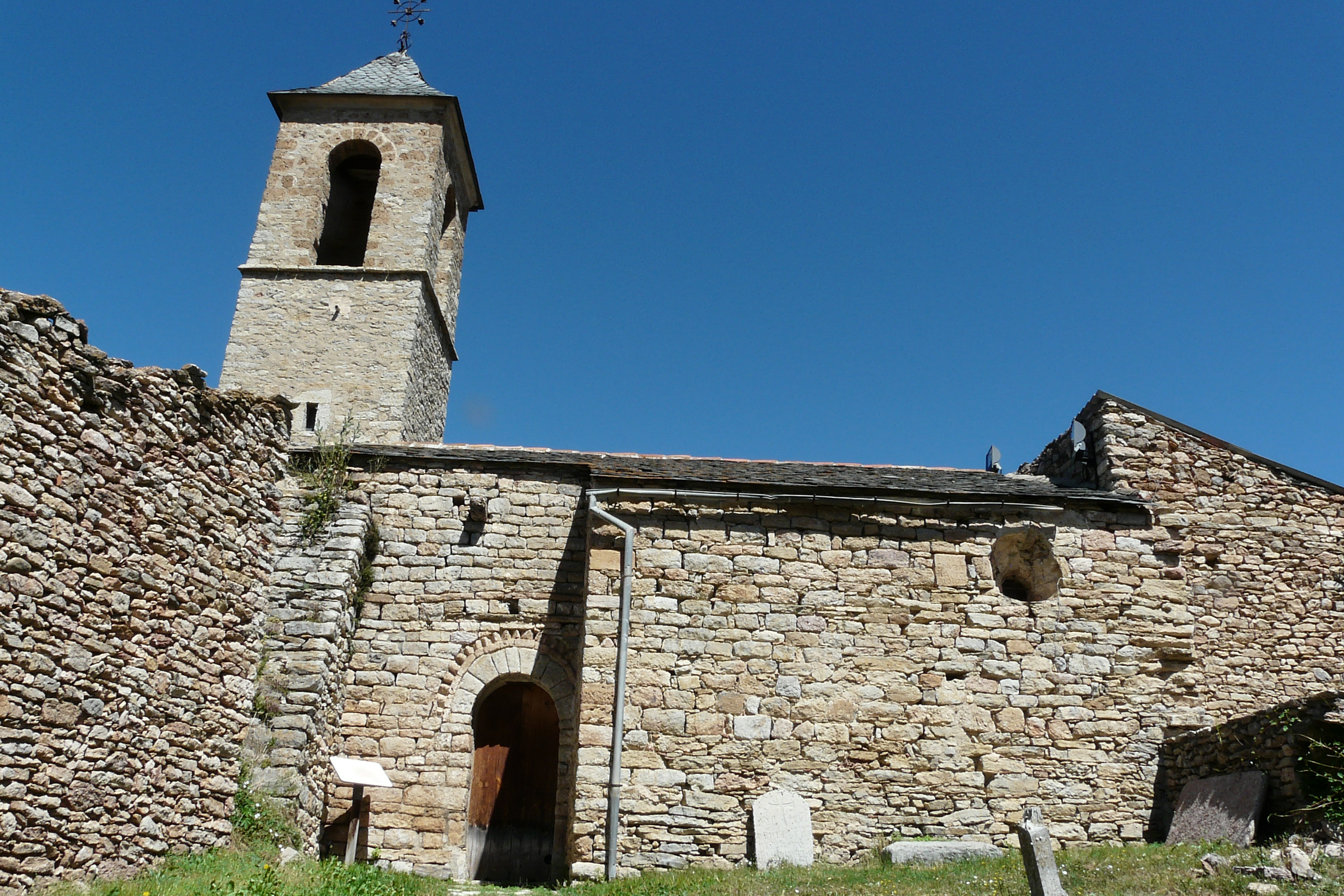
Exterior

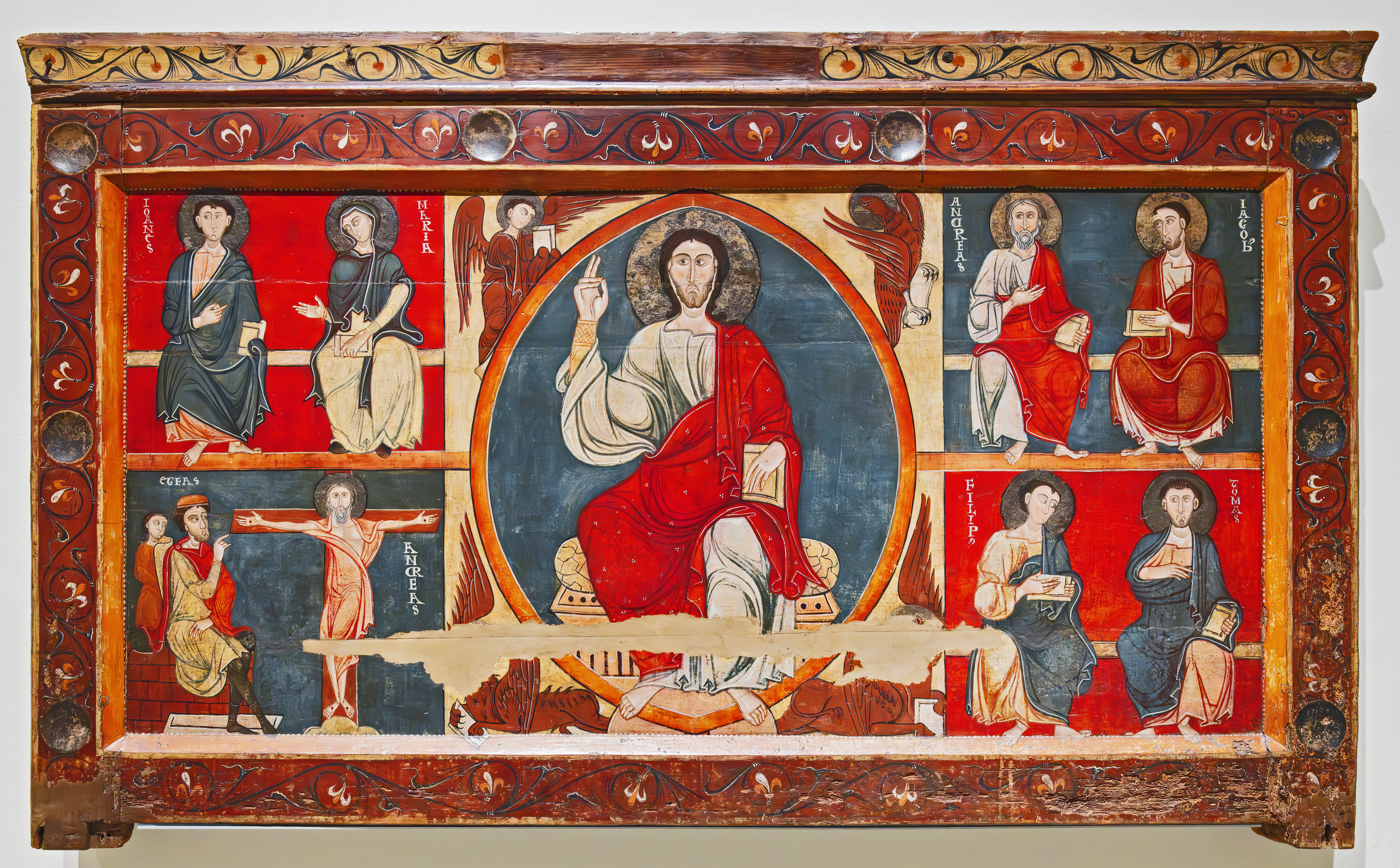
Painted wood altar frontal

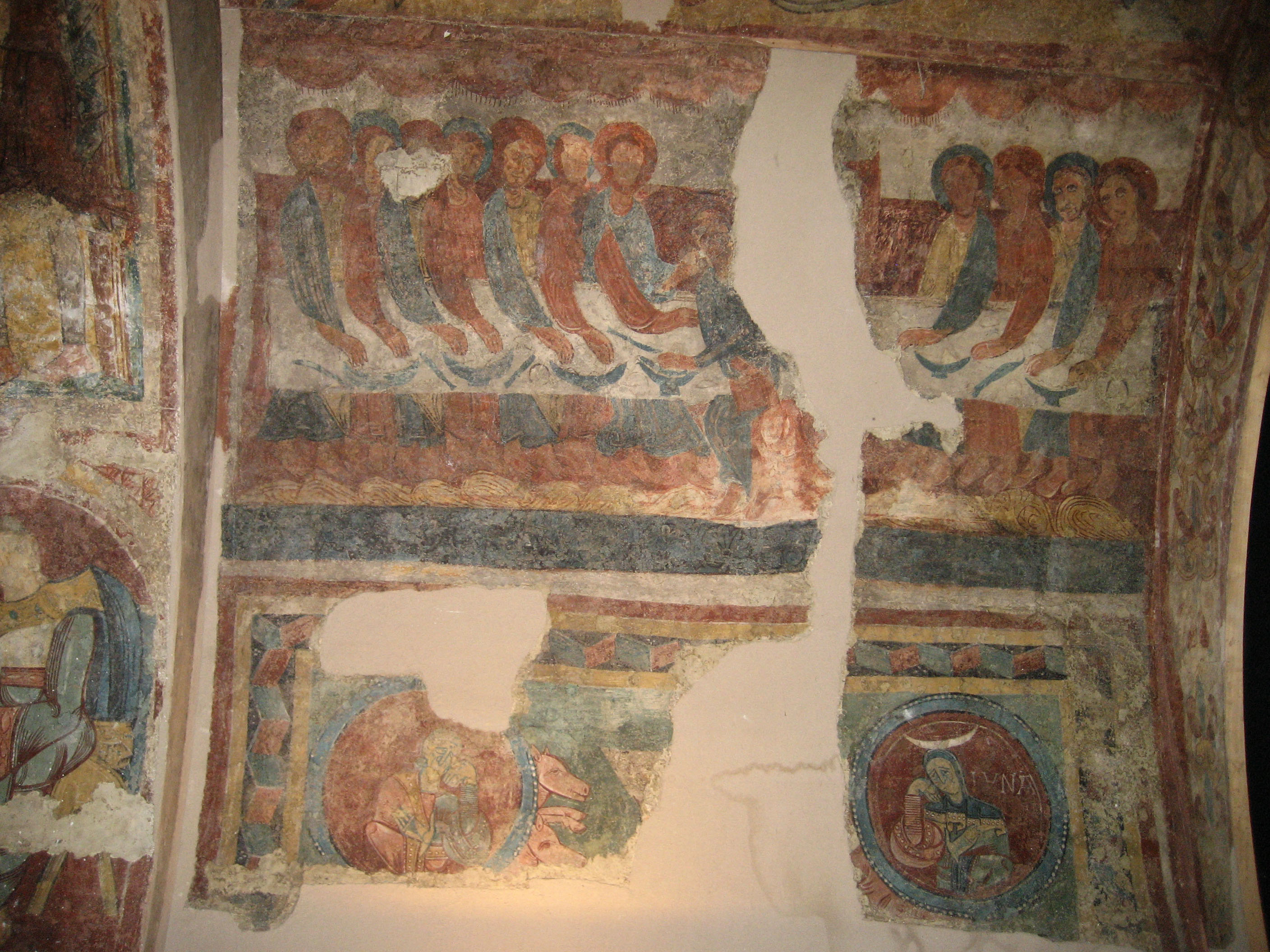
Ceiling frescoes
