= Bellver de Cerdanya =

- Municipality
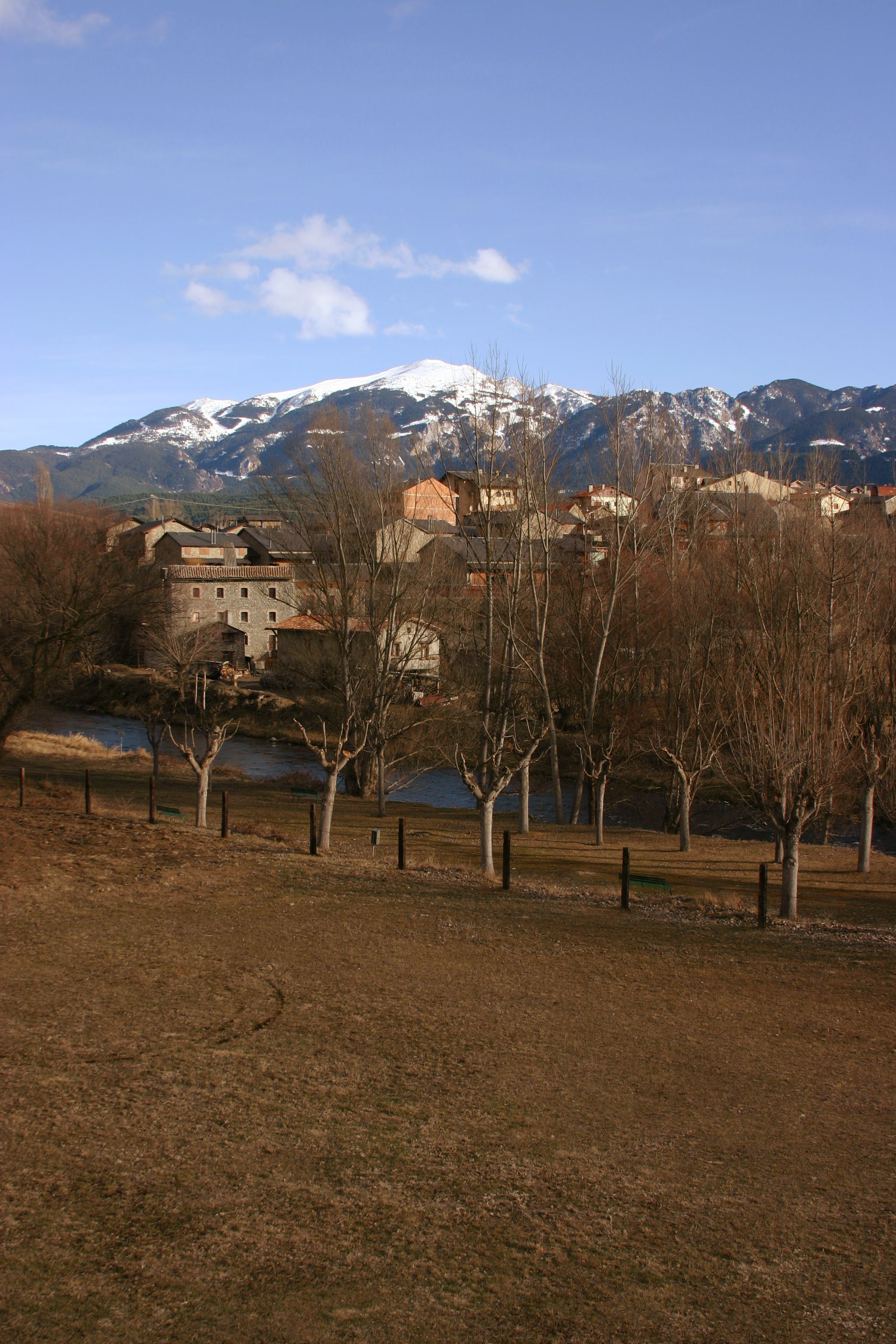

- Coat of arms

- Location within Province of Lleida Location within Spain
- Coordinates: 42°22′21″N 1°46′38″E
- Country: Spain
- Autonomous community: Catalonia
- Province: Lleida
- Comarca: Cerdanya

Government
  - Mayor: Laia Serra Domingo

Area
  - Total: 98.2 km^{2} (37.9 sq mi)
- Elevation: 1,061 m (3,481 ft)

Population (2025-01-01)
  - Total: 2,289
  - Density: 23.3/km^{2} (60.4/sq mi)
- Demonym: Bellverenc
- Time zone: UTC+1 (CET)
  - Summer (DST): UTC+2 (CEST)
- Postal code: 25720
- Website: bellver.org

Bellver de Cerdanya (Old Catalan for 'beautiful view of Cerdanya'; Catalan pronunciation: [bəʎˈβɛ ðə səɾˈðaɲə]) is a town in the comarca of Cerdanya, province of Lleida, Catalonia, Spain. It has a population of 2,289 (register office, 2025).

== Integrated villages and hamlets ==
- Baltarga, 38 inhabitants
- Beders, 14 inhabitants
- Bellver de Cerdanya, 1.314 inhabitants
- Bor, 94 inhabitants
- Coborriu de Bellver, 20 inhabitants
- Cortariu, 3 inhabitants
- Cortàs, 18 inhabitants
- Éller, 15 inhabitants
- Nas, 7 inhabitants
- Nèfol, 6 inhabitants, located in the Cadí-Moixeró Natural Park and mentioned as one of the villages involved in the Consecration of the Cathedral of Urgell in 839
- Olià, 13 inhabitants
- Ordèn, 10 inhabitants
- Pedra, 13 inhabitants
- Pi, 84 inhabitants
- Riu de Santa Maria, 95 inhabitants
- Sant Martí dels Castells, uninhabited
- Santa Eugènia de Nerellà, 12 inhabitants
- Santa Magdalena de Talló, 7 inhabitants
- Talló, 31 inhabitants
- Talltendre, 5 inhabitants
- Vilella, 7 inhabitants

== Places of interest ==
- In Baltarga, the Romanesque church dedicated to St. Andrew (11th century, with two side chapels attached in 18th century);
- In Bor, the Romanesque church dedicated to St. Marcellus (11th century);
- in Coborriu de Bellver, the Romanesque church dedicated to St. Serni, first mentioned in the 10th century, suffered fire and destruction by the French in 1793 and during the Spanish Civil War in 1936; it was restored in 1967;
- in Cortàs, the Romanesque church of St. Polycarp (12th century);
- in Éller, the Romanesque church of Santa Eulalia (12th century);
- in Pedra, the Romanesque church of Santa Julia, ransacked by the Albigensian in 1198 and modified in the 15th century after an earthquake;
- in Pi, the Romanesque church of Santa Eulalia, vastly modified in the 18th century; only the lateral walls and the bell tower belong to the original structure;
- in Sant Martí dels Castells, the Romanesque chapel of St. Martin built inside the castle; its slightly pointed vault was rebuilt during Gothic times;
- in Santa Eugènia de Nerellà, the only original structure of the 10th century Romanesque church is the bell tower, heavily tilted towards southeast;
- in Talló the 11th century Romanesque church of Santa Maria; its bell tower was built in the 17th century;
- in Talltendre, the 12th century Romanesque church of Sant Iscle and Santa Victoria; its bell tower was built later.
