= Nèfol =

- Locality
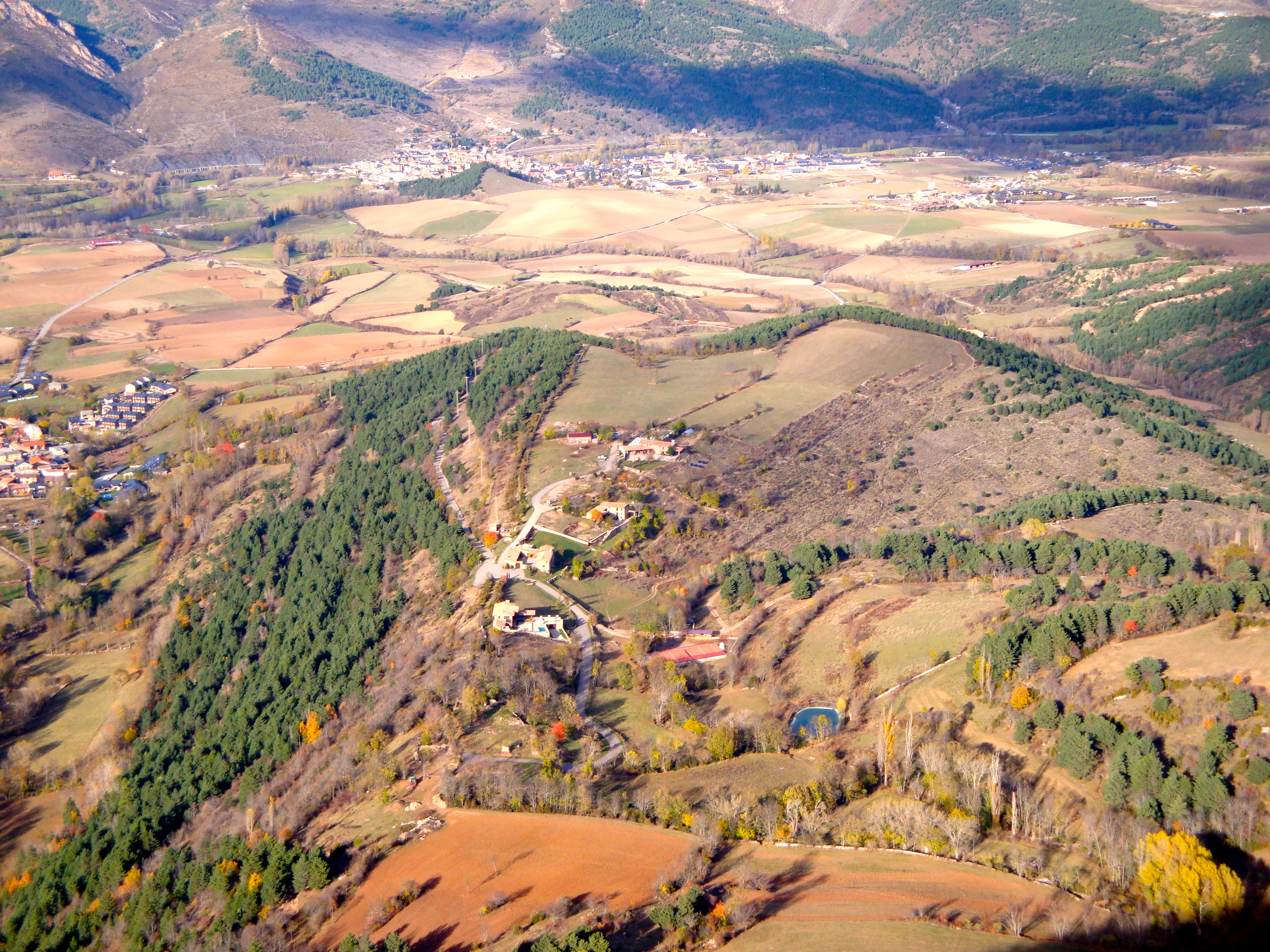

- Location within Province of Lleida Location within Catalonia Location within Spain
- Coordinates: 42°20′30″N 1°45′47″E
- Country: Spain
- Community: Catalonia
- Province: Lleida
- Municipality: Bellver de Cerdanya

Population
  - Total: 0

Nèfol is a hamlet located in the municipality of Bellver de Cerdanya, in Province of Lleida province, Catalonia, Spain. As of 2020, it has a population of 0.

== Geography ==
Nèfol is located 210km northeast of Lleida.
