= Beders =

- Locality
- Location within Province of Lleida Location within Catalonia Location within Spain
- Coordinates: 42°21′22″N 1°48′21″E
- Country: Spain
- Community: Catalonia
- Province: Lleida
- Municipality: Bellver de Cerdanya
- Elevation: 1,085 m (3,560 ft)

Population
  - Total: 27

Beders is a hamlet located in the municipality of Bellver de Cerdanya, in Province of Lleida province, Catalonia, Spain. As of 2020, it has a population of 27.

== Geography ==
Beders is located 204km northeast of Lleida.
