= Sant Martí dels Castells =

- Locality
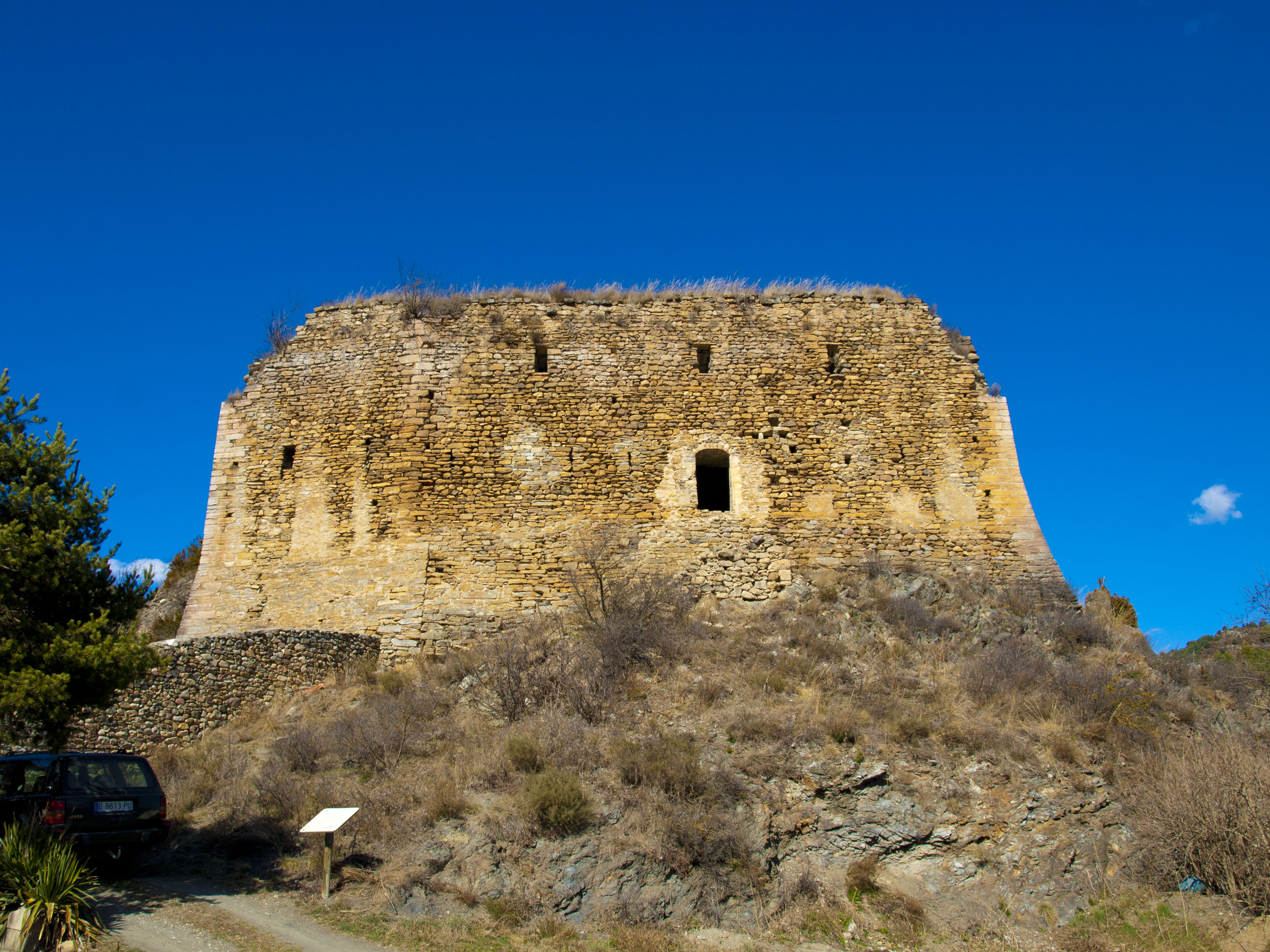

- Location within Province of Lleida Location within Catalonia Location within Spain
- Coordinates: 42°21′55″N 1°42′46″E
- Country: Spain
- Community: Catalonia
- Province: Lleida
- Municipality: Bellver de Cerdanya
- Elevation: 1,004 m (3,294 ft)

Population
  - Total: 0

Sant Martí dels Castells is a deserted locality located in the municipality of Bellver de Cerdanya, in Province of Lleida province, Catalonia, Spain. As of 2020, it has a population of 0.

== Geography ==
Sant Martí dels Castells is located 212km northeast of Lleida.
