= Nas (Bellver de Cerdaña) =

- Locality
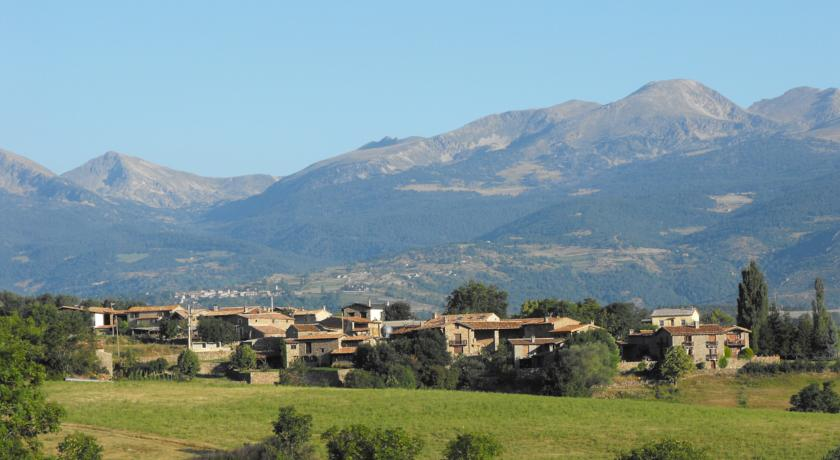

- Location within Province of Lleida Location within Catalonia Location within Spain
- Coordinates: 42°20′56″N 1°44′36″E
- Country: Spain
- Community: Catalonia
- Province: Lleida
- Municipality: Bellver de Cerdanya
- Elevation: 1,226 m (4,022 ft)

Population
  - Total: 32

Nas is a locality located in the municipality of Bellver de Cerdanya, in Province of Lleida province, Catalonia, Spain. As of 2020, it has a population of 32.

== Geography ==
Nas is located 212km northeast of Lleida.
