= Talltendre =

- Locality
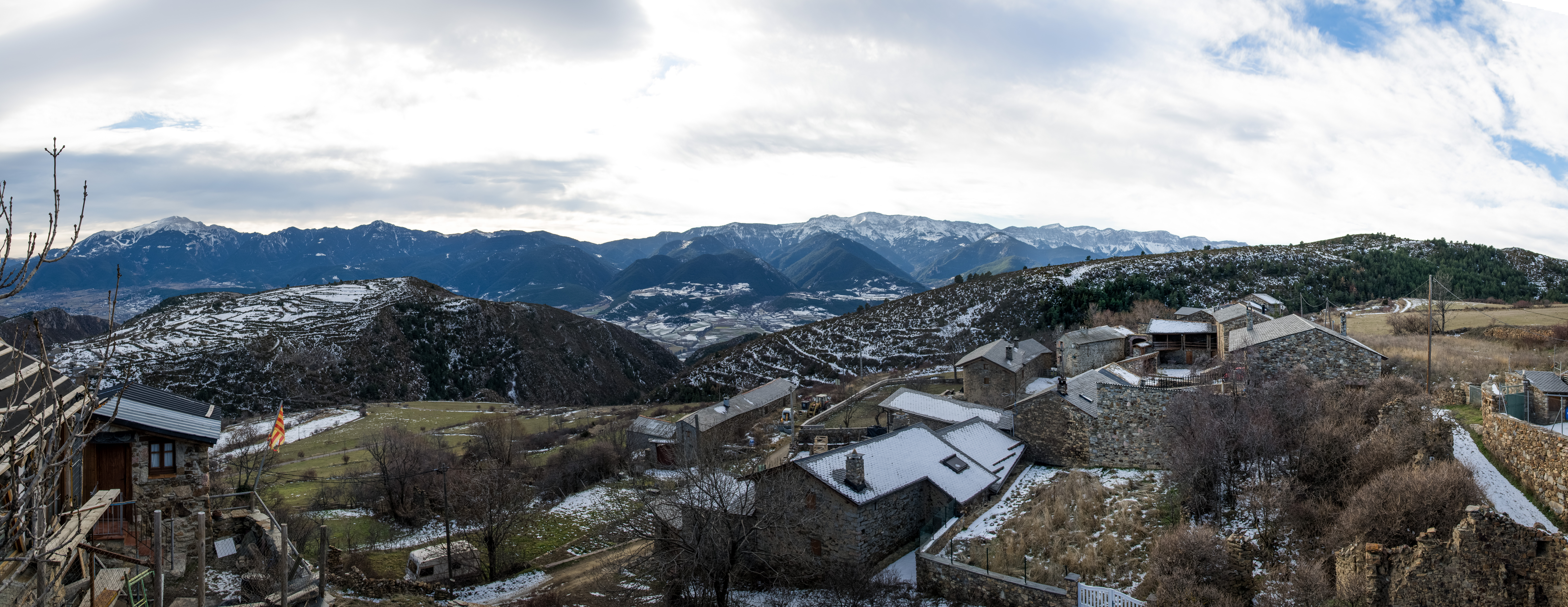

- Location within Province of Lleida Location within Catalonia Location within Spain
- Coordinates: 42°24′13″N 1°45′57″E
- Country: Spain
- Community: Catalonia
- Province: Lleida
- Municipality: Bellver de Cerdanya
- Elevation: 1,581 m (5,187 ft)

Population
  - Total: 6

Talltendre is a locality located in the municipality of Bellver de Cerdanya, in Province of Lleida province, Catalonia, Spain. As of 2020, it has a population of 6.

== Geography ==
Talltendre is located 214km northeast of Lleida.
