= Pedra (Bellver de Cerdanya) =

- Locality
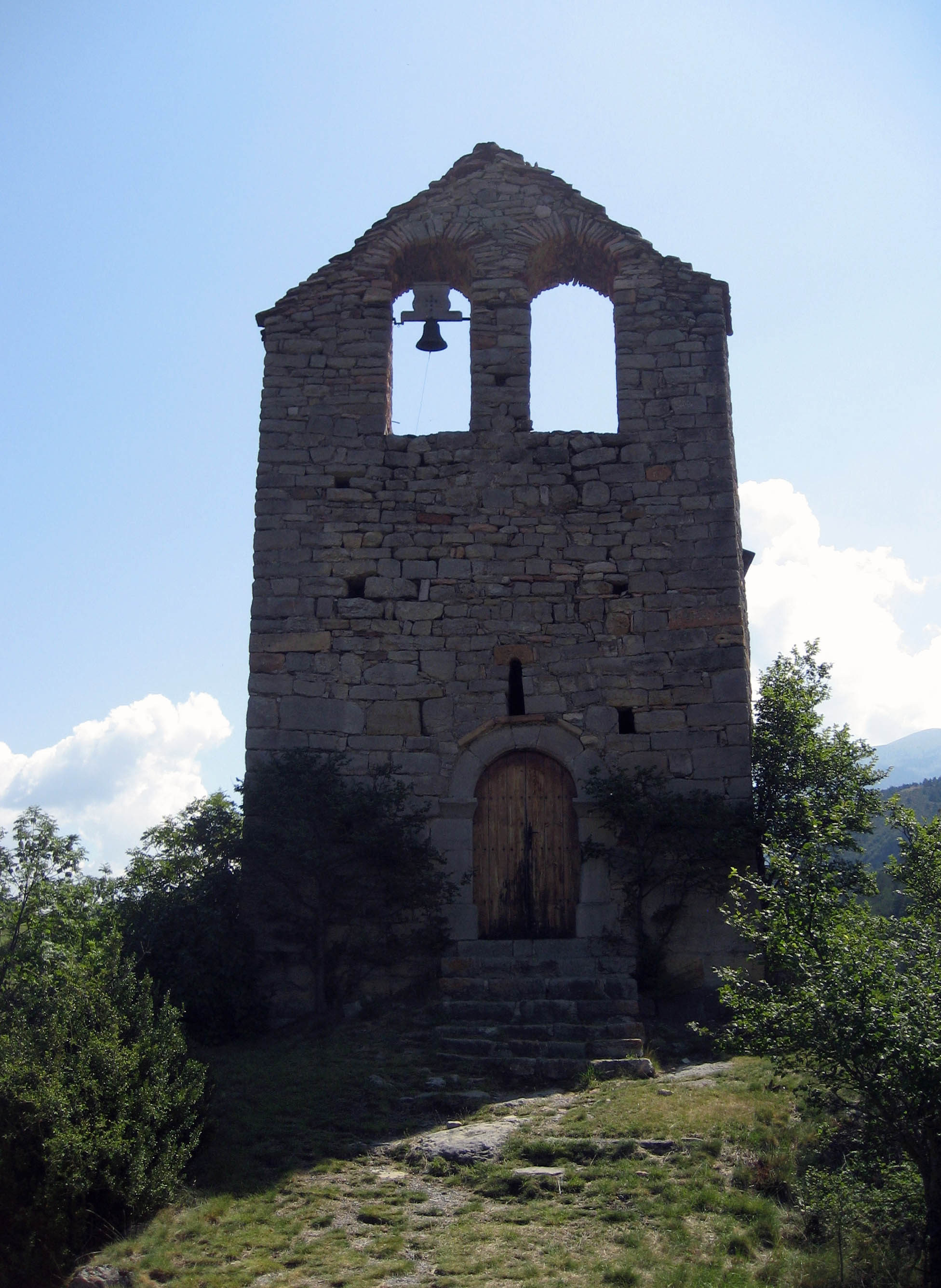

- Location within Province of Lleida Location within Catalonia Location within Spain
- Coordinates: 42°20′42″N 1°48′38″E
- Country: Spain
- Community: Catalonia
- Province: Lleida
- Municipality: Bellver de Cerdanya
- Elevation: 1,132 m (3,714 ft)

Population
  - Total: 12

Pedra is a locality located in the municipality of Bellver de Cerdanya, in Province of Lleida province, Catalonia, Spain. As of 2020, it has a population of 12.

== Geography ==
Pedra is located 202km northeast of Lleida.
