= Coborriu de Bellver =

- Locality
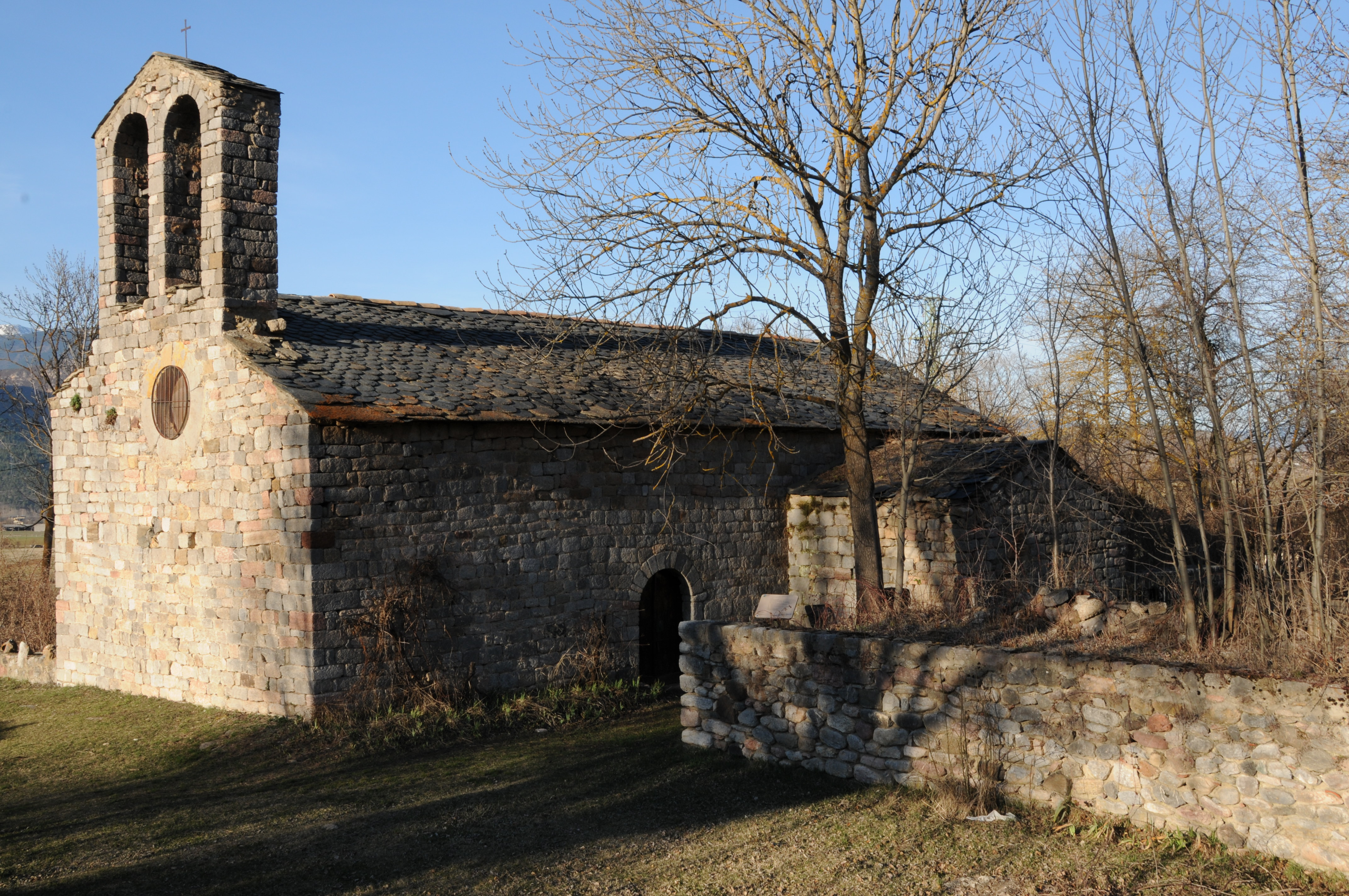

- Location within Province of Lleida Location within Catalonia Location within Spain
- Coordinates: 42°21′19″N 1°47′6″E
- Country: Spain
- Community: Catalonia
- Province: Lleida
- Municipality: Bellver de Cerdanya
- Elevation: 1,070 m (3,510 ft)

Population
  - Total: 6

Coborriu de Bellver is a locality located in the municipality of Bellver de Cerdanya, in Province of Lleida province, Catalonia, Spain. As of 2020, it has a population of 6.

== Geography ==
Coborriu de Bellver is located 207km northeast of Lleida.
