= La Molina (ski resort) =

Ski resort on the Pyrenees, Spain

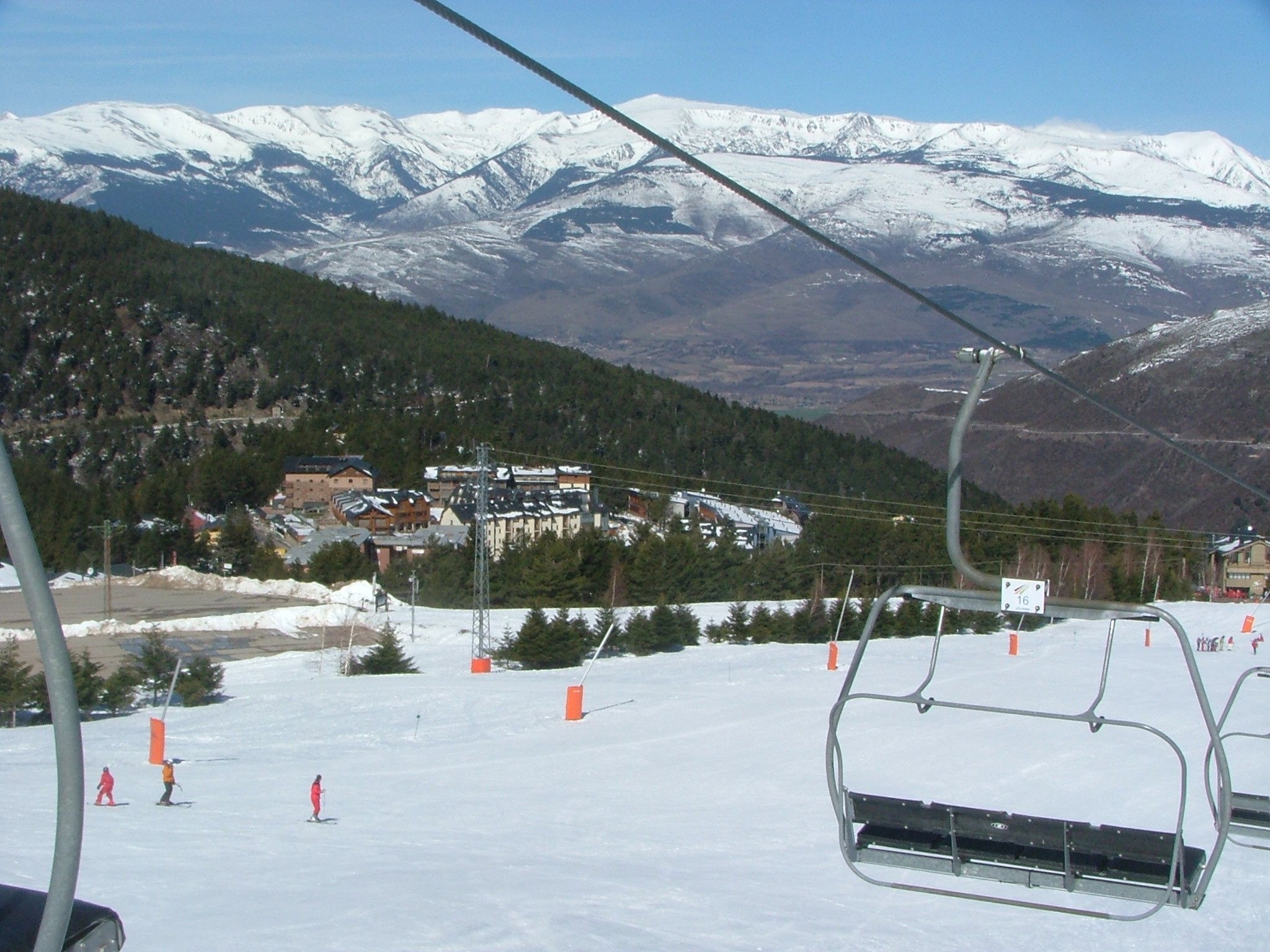
- La Molina ski resort

- Location within Spain Location within Catalonia Location within Pyrenees
- Location: Pyrenees mountains, Catalonia, Spain
- Nearest city: Barcelona
- Coordinates: 42°20′37″N 1°57′22″E
- Vertical: 860 m (2,820 ft)
- Top elevation: 2,537 m (8,323 ft)
- Base elevation: 1,667 m (5,469 ft)
- Skiable area: 71 km
- Trails: 66
- Website: lamolina.com

La Molina is a ski resort in the Pyrenees mountains of northeastern Spain, in the municipality of Alp in the comarca of Cerdanya in Girona, Catalonia. Together with Masella, it forms the Alp 2500 resort.

It is the site of the first ski lift in Spain, opened on 28 February 1943, and Spain's first ski school, which opened a year later.

It is served by a Renfe / Rodalies train station.

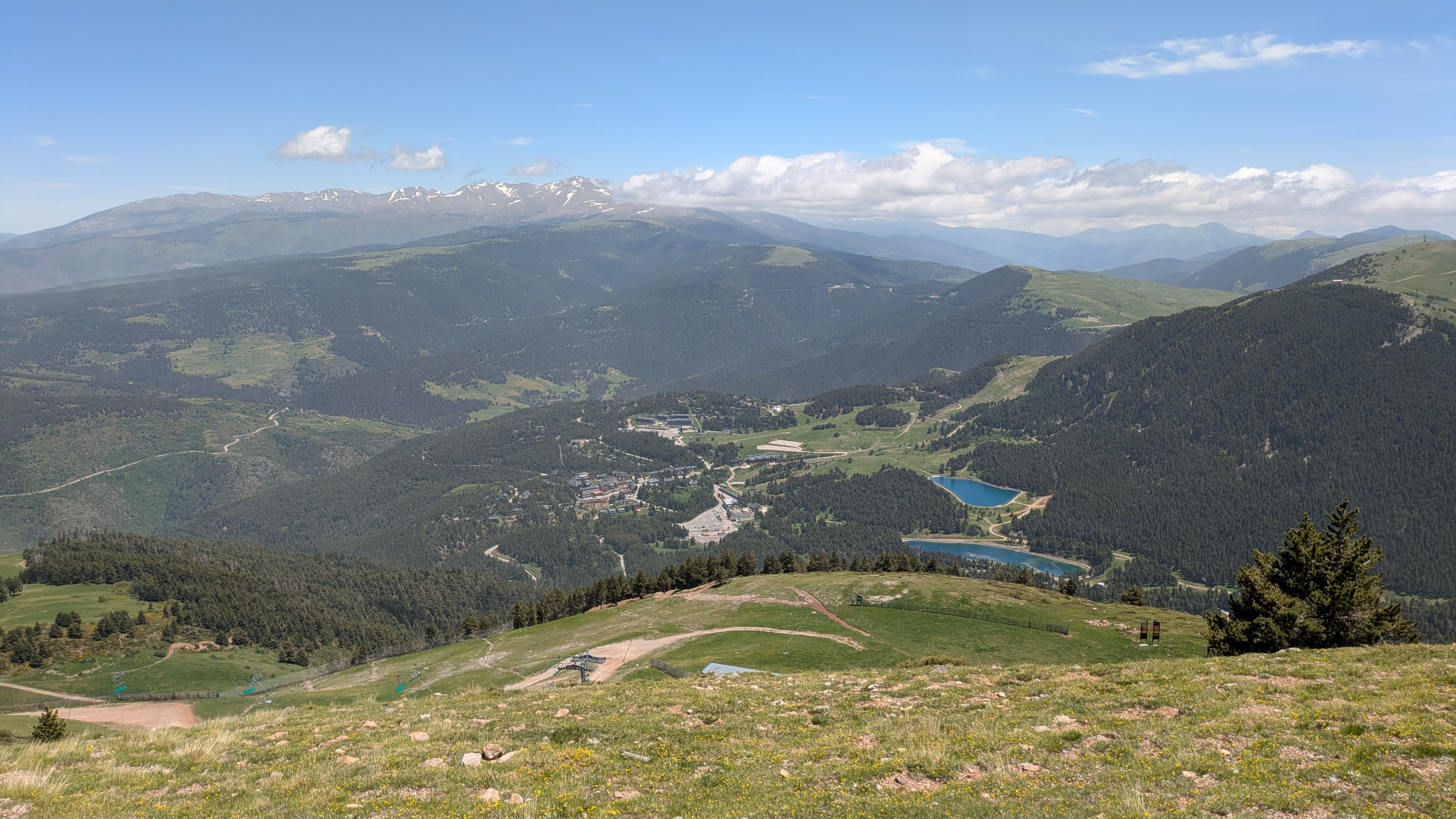
The ski station of La Molina in summer.

== Sport and recreation ==
The area hosted World Cup alpine races in December 2008 (women's technical events) and hosted the Snowboarding World Championships in January 2011. In 2013 the resort hosted the 2013 IPC Alpine Skiing World Championships. New facilities such as a new track with a lift in the area of Pla d'Anyella have been built.

On 23 March 2016 the resort was the finishing point for the third stage of the road cycling race the Volta a Catalunya, which was won by Dan Martin of Etixx–Quick-Step.

== Climate ==
La Molina has an oceanic climate (Köppen climate classification: Cfb), bordering on a humid continental climate (Köppen: Dfb). It is characterized by cool winters and cool to warm summers, with precipitation being constant throughout the year. Temperatures below 0 °C (32 °F) occur during winter and nights below −5 °C (23 °F) are common. Snow is also quite common, being a tourist attraction during winter.

Climate data for La Molina altitude 1703m (1991–2020), extremes (1932-present)
Month	Jan	Feb	Mar	Apr	May	Jun	Jul	Aug	Sep	Oct	Nov	Dec	Year
Record high °C (°F)	17.0 (62.6)	20.0 (68.0)	19.5 (67.1)	22.0 (71.6)	27.2 (81.0)	30.6 (87.1)	31.9 (89.4)	31.5 (88.7)	29.0 (84.2)	26.4 (79.5)	20.0 (68.0)	17.0 (62.6)	31.9 (89.4)
Mean daily maximum °C (°F)	4.4 (39.9)	5.7 (42.3)	8.3 (46.9)	9.9 (49.8)	13.7 (56.7)	17.7 (63.9)	21.4 (70.5)	21.3 (70.3)	16.8 (62.2)	12.8 (55.0)	7.9 (46.2)	4.9 (40.8)	12.1 (53.7)
Daily mean °C (°F)	0.7 (33.3)	1.1 (34.0)	3.5 (38.3)	5.2 (41.4)	8.8 (47.8)	12.6 (54.7)	15.8 (60.4)	15.8 (60.4)	11.7 (53.1)	8.2 (46.8)	3.9 (39.0)	1.4 (34.5)	7.4 (45.3)
Mean daily minimum °C (°F)	−3.1 (26.4)	−3.4 (25.9)	−1.3 (29.7)	0.4 (32.7)	3.8 (38.8)	7.4 (45.3)	10.2 (50.4)	10.3 (50.5)	6.5 (43.7)	3.7 (38.7)	−0.1 (31.8)	−2.0 (28.4)	2.7 (36.9)
Record low °C (°F)	−20.0 (−4.0)	−19.6 (−3.3)	−18.0 (−0.4)	−11.8 (10.8)	−7.0 (19.4)	−3.4 (25.9)	0.1 (32.2)	0.6 (33.1)	−4.4 (24.1)	−11.0 (12.2)	−13.6 (7.5)	−18.0 (−0.4)	−20.0 (−4.0)
Average precipitation mm (inches)	69.3 (2.73)	30.5 (1.20)	64.1 (2.52)	102.0 (4.02)	108.5 (4.27)	91.0 (3.58)	72.4 (2.85)	74.2 (2.92)	98.7 (3.89)	106.4 (4.19)	90.0 (3.54)	74.2 (2.92)	981.3 (38.63)
Average precipitation days (≥ 1 mm)	6.1	4.2	6.7	9.5	9.8	8.7	7.2	7.3	7.2	7.3	5.9	5.2	85.1
Average relative humidity (%)	63	62	63	66	66	65	61	63	70	71	69	65	65
Source: Agencia Estatal de Meteorologia
