= Bor (Bellver de Cerdanya) =

- Locality
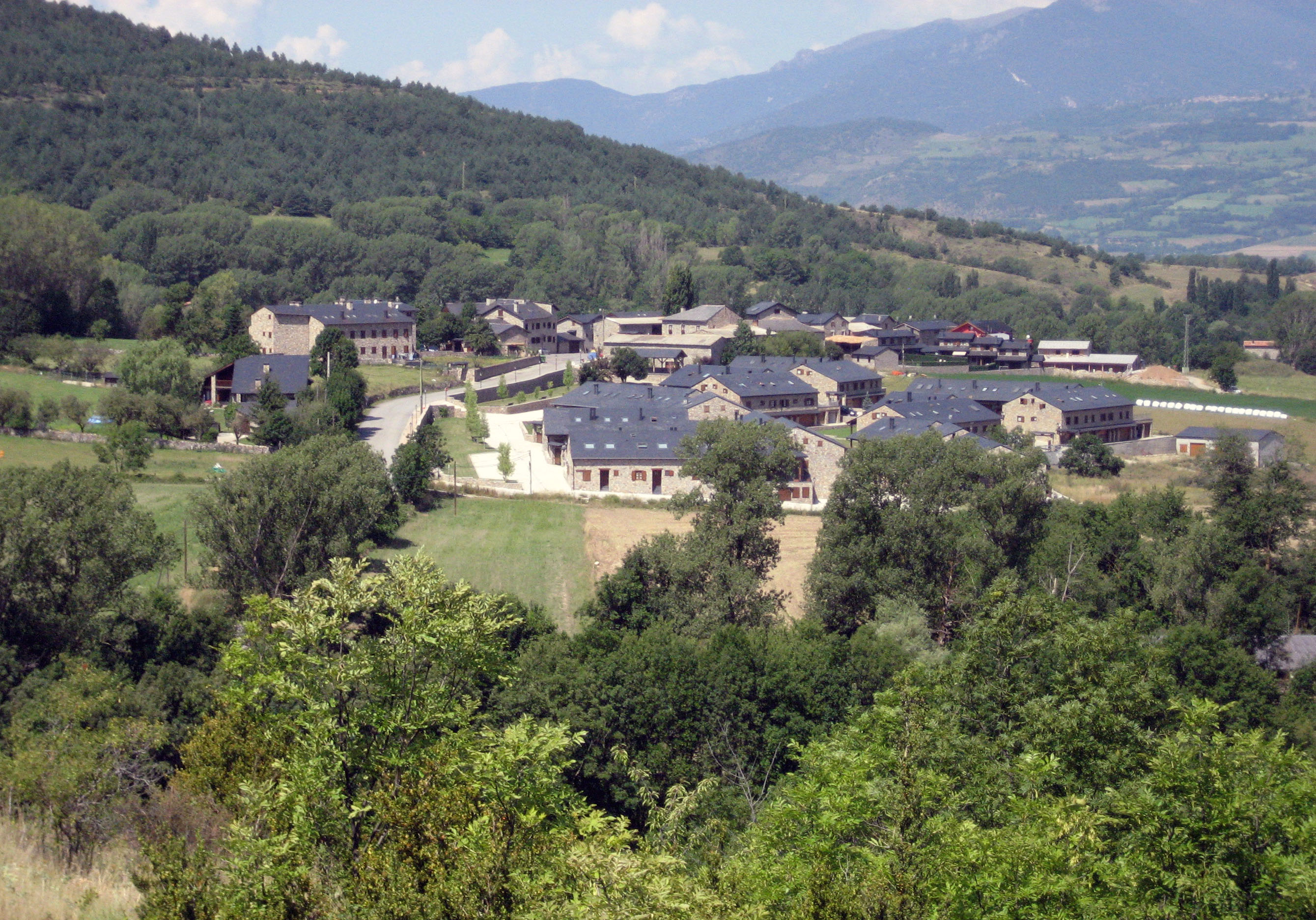

- Location within Province of Lleida Location within Catalonia Location within Spain
- Coordinates: 42°20′48″N 1°48′9″E
- Country: Spain
- Community: Catalonia
- Province: Lleida
- Municipality: Bellver de Cerdanya
- Elevation: 1,104 m (3,622 ft)

Population
  - Total: 88

Bor is a village located in the municipality of Bellver de Cerdanya, in Province of Lleida province, Catalonia, Spain. As of 2020, it has a population of 88.

== Geography ==
Bor is located 202km northeast of Lleida.
