= Korta =

Village in Rajasthan, India

Coordinates: 25°11′N 72°57′E

Korta is a village in Pali district, Rajasthan.
