= Cortàs =

- Locality
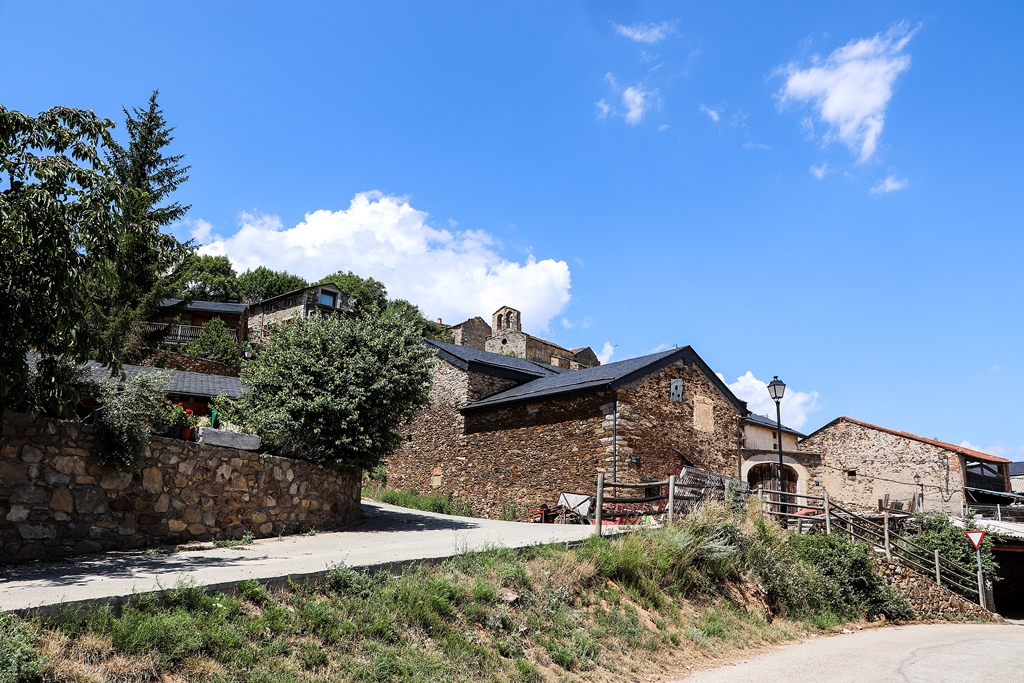

- Location within Province of Lleida Location within Catalonia Location within Spain
- Coordinates: 42°23′54″N 1°48′5″E
- Country: Spain
- Community: Catalonia
- Province: Lleida
- Municipality: Bellver de Cerdanya
- Elevation: 1,321 m (4,334 ft)

Population
  - Total: 18

Cortàs is a locality located in the municipality of Bellver de Cerdanya, in Province of Lleida province, Catalonia, Spain. As of 2020, it has a population of 18.

== Geography ==
Cortàs is located 210km northeast of Lleida.
