= Masella =

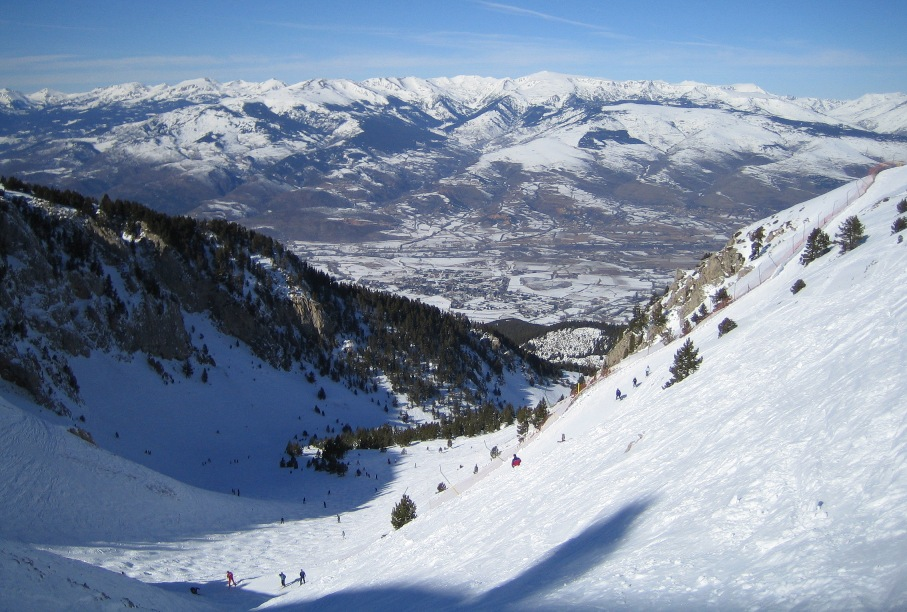
- Coma Oriola, at the east side of Masella.

- Location within Spain Location within Catalonia Location within Pyrenees
- Nearest city: Alp, Catalonia(Spain)
- Coordinates: 42°21′4.49″N 1°54′7.53″E
- Top elevation: 2,635 metres (8,645 ft)
- Base elevation: 1,650 metres (5,410 ft)
- Trails: Black: 8 Red: 22; Blue: 23; Green: 9 Total 62
- Total length: 72 km (45 mi)
- Website: www.masella.com

Masella, belonging to Alp's municipality, is a ski resort in La Cerdanya in Girona, Catalunya in the Spanish Pyrenees. It is situated on the Tosa d'Alp mountain. This ski resort is part of the Alp 2500 resort.

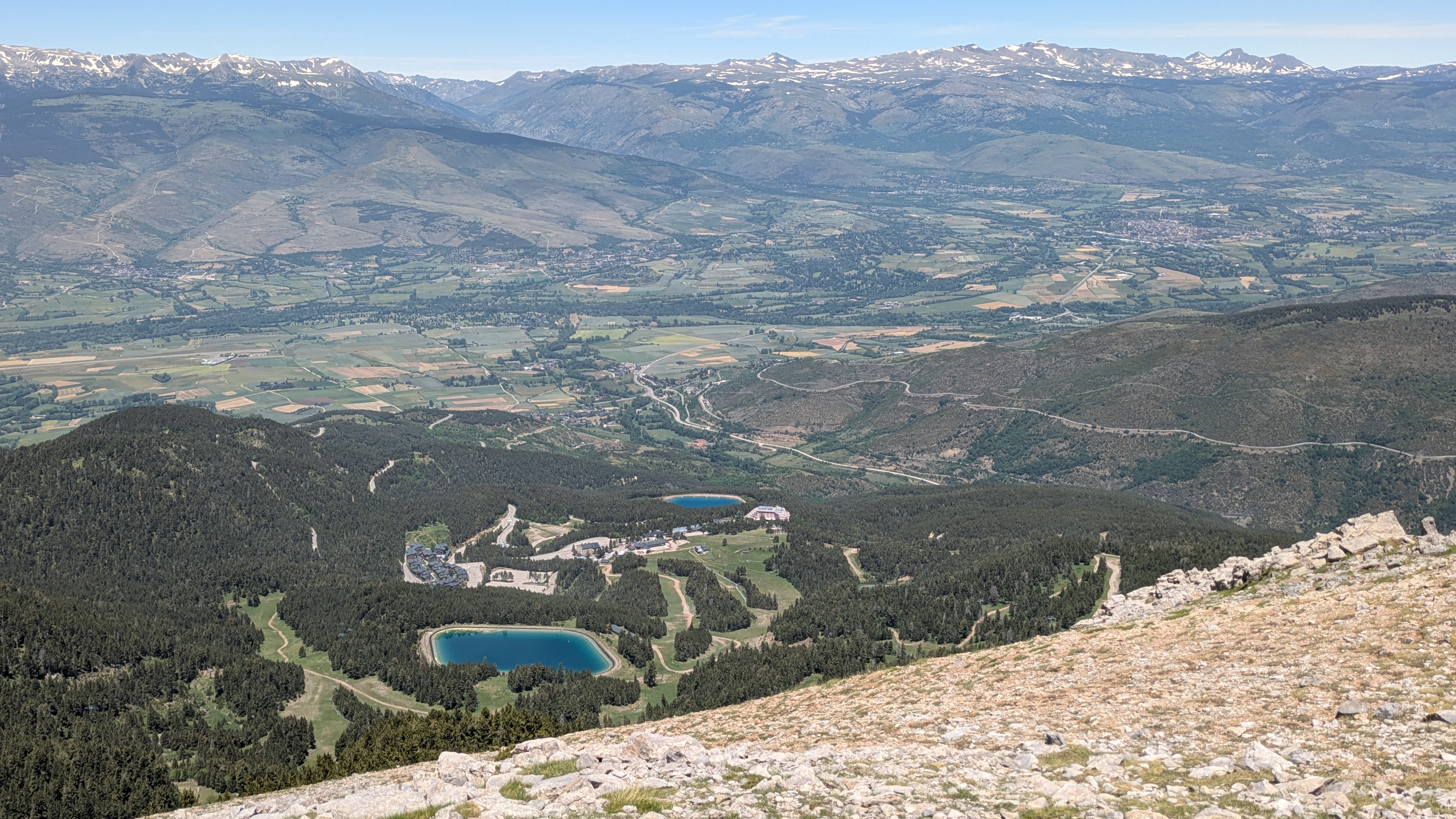
The ski station of Masella, in summer.
