= Santa Eugènia de Nerellà =

- Locality
- Location within Province of Lleida Location within Catalonia Location within Spain
- Coordinates: 42°21′31″N 1°44′9″E
- Country: Spain
- Community: Catalonia
- Province: Lleida
- Municipality: Bellver de Cerdanya
- Elevation: 1,052 m (3,451 ft)

Population
  - Total: 18

Santa Eugènia de Nerellà is a hamlet located in the municipality of Bellver de Cerdanya, in Province of Lleida province, Catalonia, Spain. As of 2020, it has a population of 18.

== Geography ==
Santa Eugènia de Nerellà is located 210km northeast of Lleida.
