= Drag City =

Drag City may refer to:

- "Drag City" (song), a 1963 song from Jan & Dean's album of the same name
- Drag City (album), a 1963 album by Jan & Dean
- Drag City (record label), an indie record label, film distributor, and book publisher

== See also ==
- Drag, Norway, a village in Tysfjord municipality, Nordland, Norway
- Drág, the Hungarian name for Dragu Commune in Sălaj County, Romania
