= Băbeni (disambiguation) =

Băbeni may refer to several places in Romania:

- Băbeni, a town in Vâlcea County
- Băbeni, Sălaj, a commune in Sălaj County
- Băbeni, a village in Topliceni Commune, Buzău County
- Băbeni-Olteţu, a village in Diculești Commune, Vâlcea County
