= Dacian fortress of Sub Cetate =

- Location within Romania
- 47.1011°N 22.6927°E
- Location: Cetate, Marca, Sălaj, Romania

Site notes
- Condition: Ruined

It was a Dacian fortified town.
