= Cozla =

Cozla may refer to:

- Cozla, a village in Berzasca Commune, Caraş-Severin County, Romania
- Cozla, a village in Letca Commune, Sălaj County, Romania
