= Poiana Blenchii =

- Commune
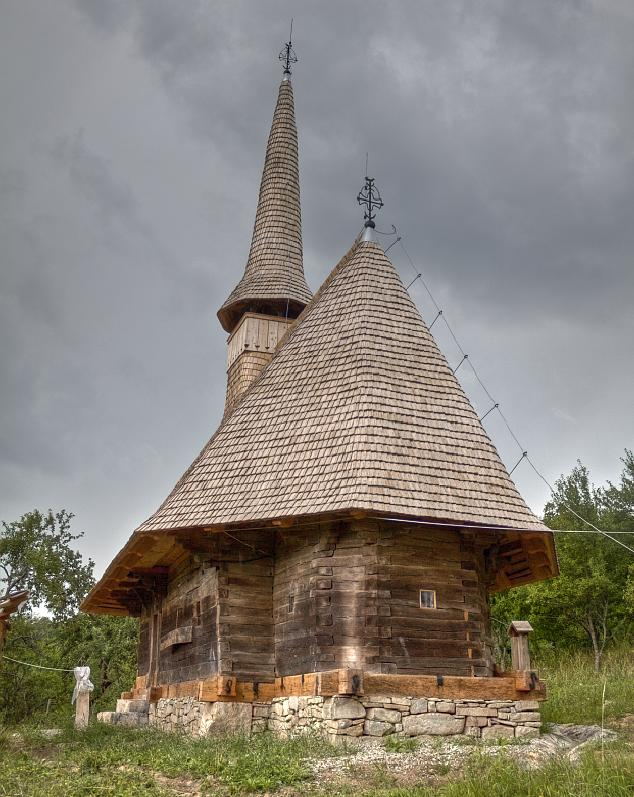
- Wooden church in Măgura

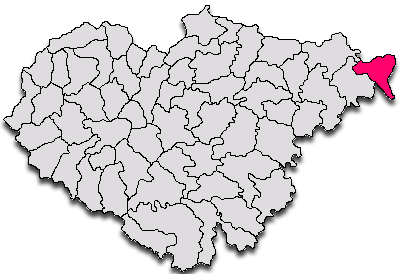
- Location in Sălaj County

- Location in Romania
- Coordinates: 47°18′25″N 23°44′57″E
- Country: Romania
- County: Sălaj

Government
  - Mayor (2020–2024): Augustin-Vasile Vășcan (PSD)
- Area: 52.98 km^{2} (20.46 sq mi)
- Elevation: 246 m (807 ft)
- Population (2021-12-01): 1,094
  - Density: 20.65/km^{2} (53.48/sq mi)
- Time zone: UTC+02:00 (EET)
  - Summer (DST): UTC+03:00 (EEST)
- Postal code: 457275
- Area code: +(40) 260
- Vehicle reg.: SJ
- Website: www.poiana-blenchii.ro

Poiana Blenchii (Hungarian: Blenkemező) is a commune located in Sălaj County, Transylvania, Romania. It is composed of four villages: Fălcușa (Falkosány), Gostila (Csicsógombás), Măgura (Kishegy), and Poiana Blenchii.

== Sights ==
- Wooden church in Măgura (c. 1707), historic monument
