= Mirșid =

- Commune
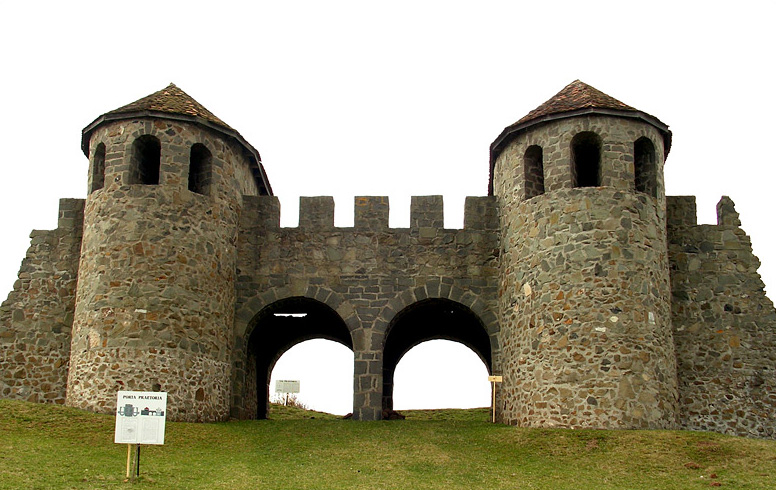
- The Porta Praetoria, the gate of ancient Roman castra Porolissum

- Coat of arms

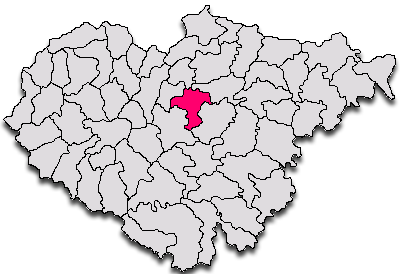
- Location in Sălaj County

- Location in Romania
- Coordinates: 47°13′48″N 23°07′12″E
- Country: Romania
- County: Sălaj

Government
  - Mayor (2020–2024): Călin-Augustin Bereschi (PSD)
- Area: 53.28 km^{2} (20.57 sq mi)
- Elevation: 263 m (863 ft)
- Population (2021-12-01): 2,280
  - Density: 42.8/km^{2} (111/sq mi)
- Time zone: UTC+02:00 (EET)
  - Summer (DST): UTC+03:00 (EEST)
- Postal code: 457250
- Area code: +(40) 0260
- Vehicle reg.: SJ
- Website: comunamirsid.ro

Mirșid (Hungarian: Nyirsid) is a commune located in Sălaj County, Crișana, Romania. It is composed of four villages: Firminiș (Fürményes), Mirșid, Moigrad-Porolissum (until 1996 Moigrad; Mojgrád), and Popeni (Szilágypaptelek).

== Sights ==
- Porolissum Roman fortification, historic monument
