= Benesat =

Benesat Benedekfalva
- Commune
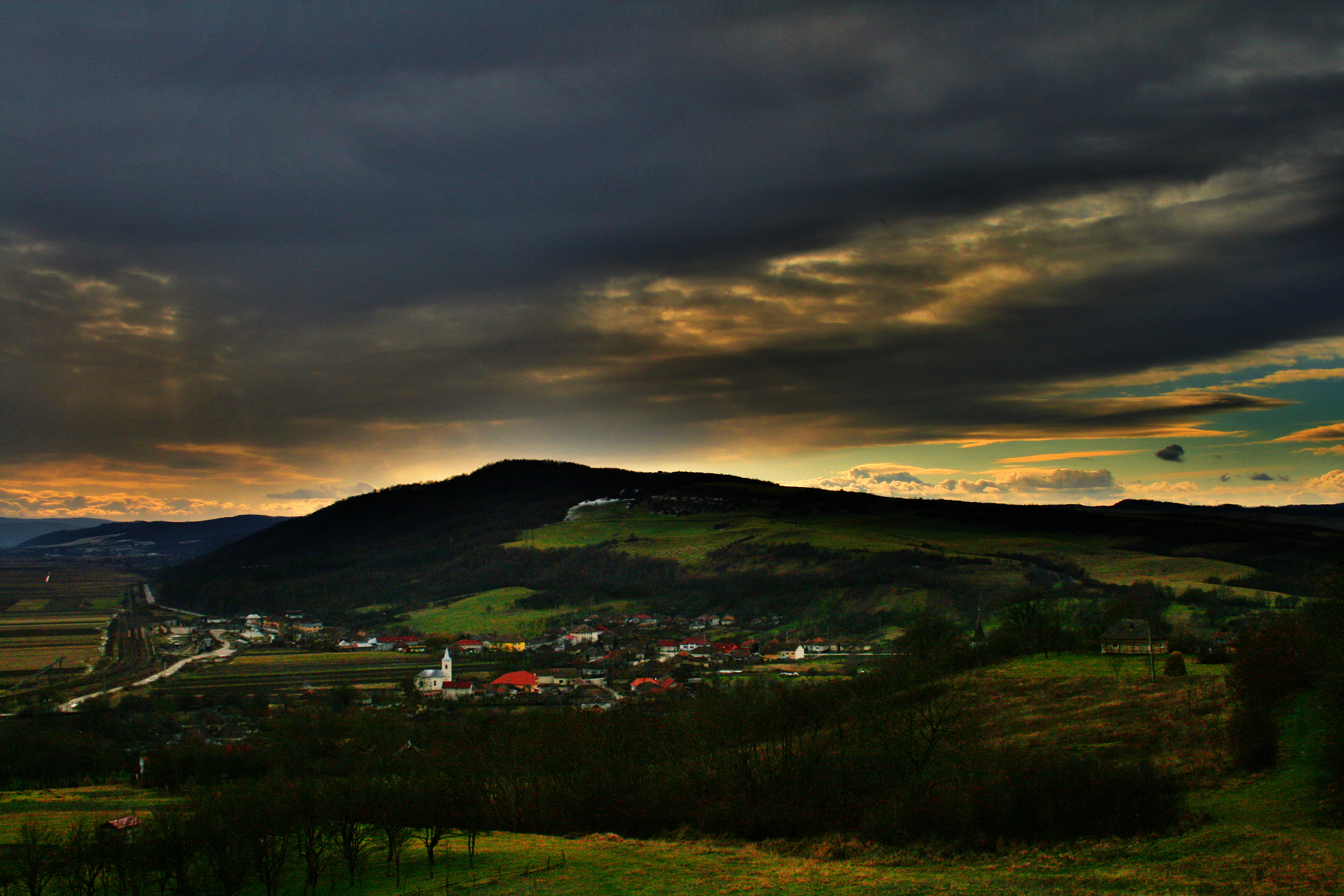
- Benesat village

- Coat of arms

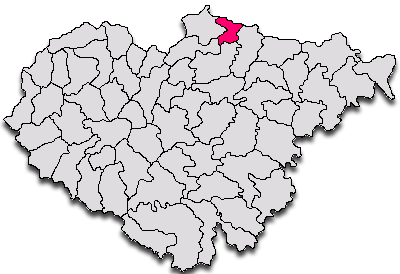
- Location in Sălaj County

- Location in Romania
- Coordinates: 47°25′N 23°18′E
- Country: Romania
- County: Sălaj

Government
  - Mayor (2020–2024): Sorin-Alexandru Romocea (PNL)
- Area: 28.75 km^{2} (11.10 sq mi)
- Elevation: 175 m (574 ft)
- Population (2021-12-01): 1,354
  - Density: 47.10/km^{2} (122.0/sq mi)
- Time zone: UTC+02:00 (EET)
  - Summer (DST): UTC+03:00 (EEST)
- Postal code: 457035
- Area code: +(40) 0260
- Vehicle reg.: SJ
- Website: comunabenesat.ro

Benesat (Hungarian: Benedekfalva) is a commune located in Sălaj County, Crișana, Romania. It is composed of three villages: Aluniș (Szamosszéplak), Benesat, and Biușa (Bősháza).

== Sights ==
- Eastern Orthodox Church in Benesat, built in the 17th century (1700), historic monument
- Reformed Church in Benesat, built in the 20th century (1909)
