= Dragu =

- Commune
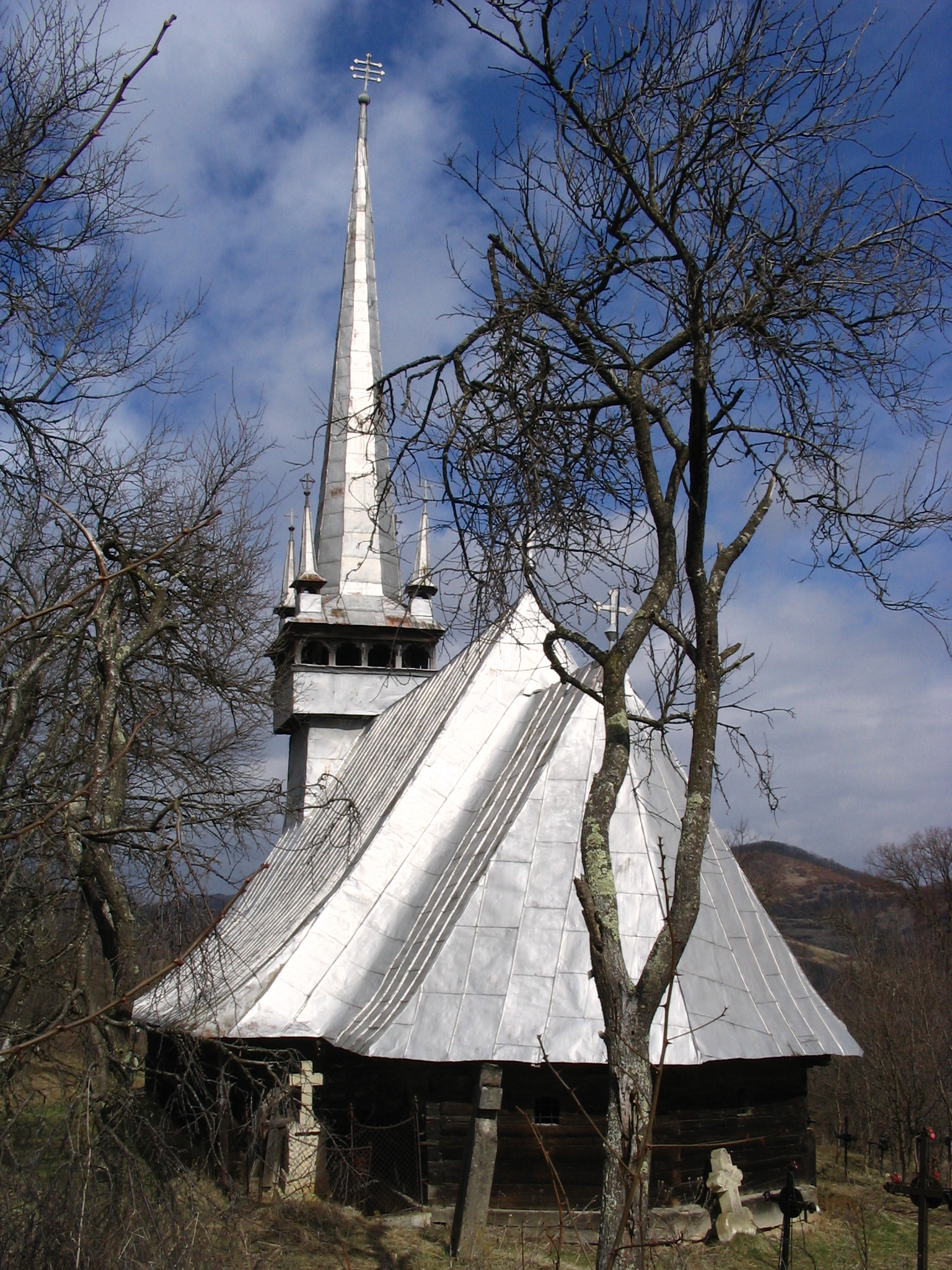
- Wooden church in Dragu, historic monument

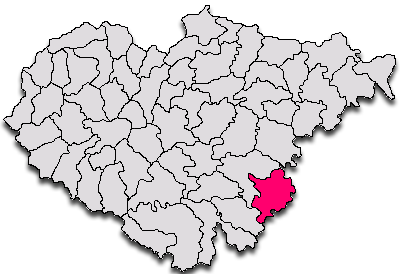
- Location in Sălaj County

- Location in Romania
- Coordinates: 47°02′N 23°24′E
- Country: Romania
- County: Sălaj

Government
  - Mayor (2024–2028): Angelica Lazăr (PNL)
- Area: 87.91 km^{2} (33.94 sq mi)
- Elevation: 278 m (912 ft)
- Population (2021-12-01): 1,559
  - Density: 17.73/km^{2} (45.93/sq mi)
- Time zone: UTC+02:00 (EET)
  - Summer (DST): UTC+03:00 (EEST)
- Postal code: 457130
- Area code: +(40) 0260
- Vehicle reg.: SJ
- Website: comunadragusalaj.ro

Dragu (Hungarian: Drág) is a commune located in Sălaj County, Transylvania, Romania. It is composed of five villages: Adalin (Adalin), Dragu, Fântânele (Kabalapatak), Ugruțiu (Ugróc), and Voivodeni (Vajdaháza).

== Sights ==
- Wooden church in Dragu, built in the 19th century (1806), historic monument
- Wooden church in Adalin, built in the 18th century (1787)
- Wooden church in Voivodeni, built in the 19th century (1822), historic monument
- Wesselényi-Bethlen Castle in Dragu, built in the 18th century, is a historic monument
