= Băbeni, Sălaj =

Băbeni
- Commune
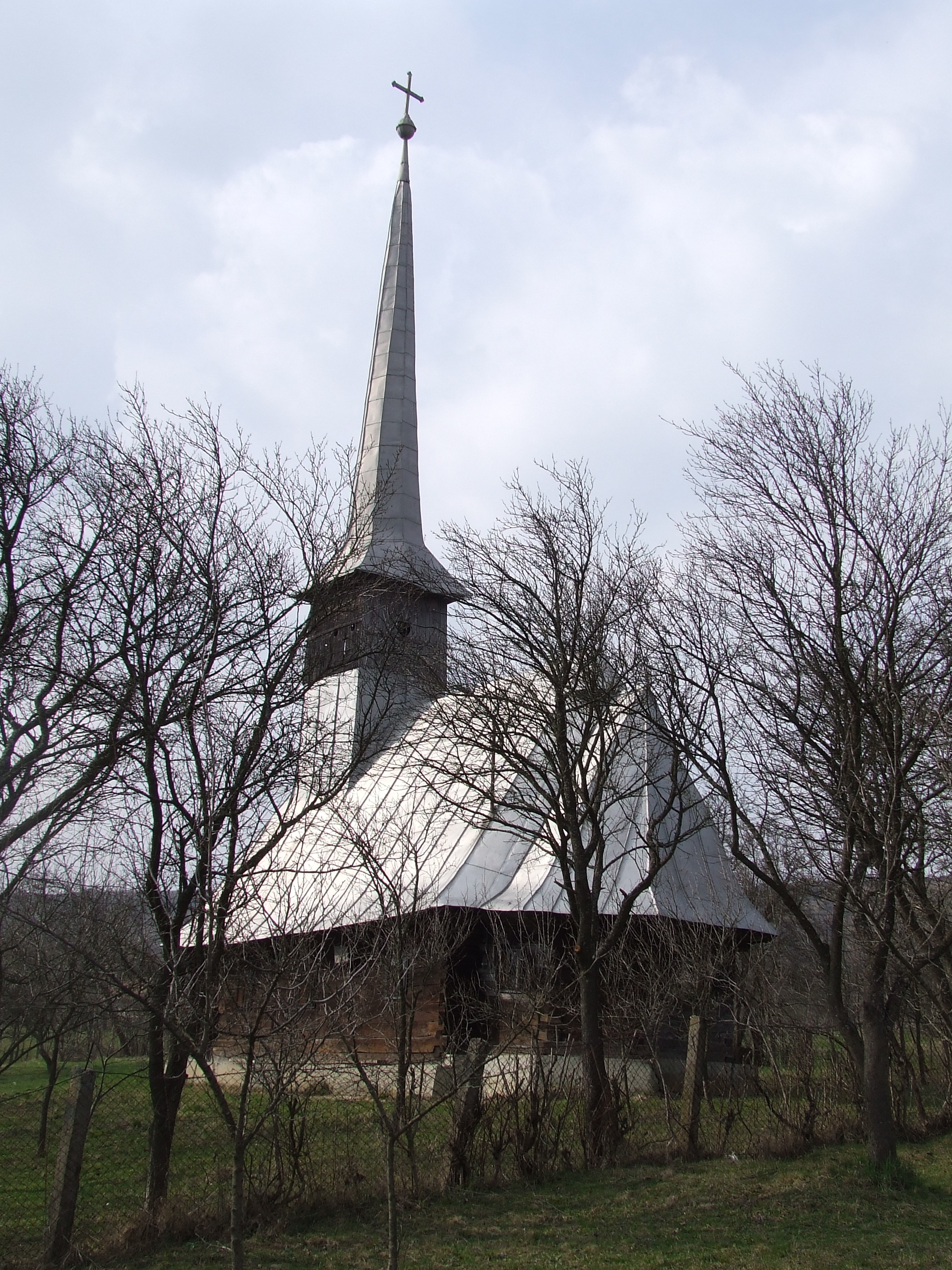
- Wooden church in Poienița

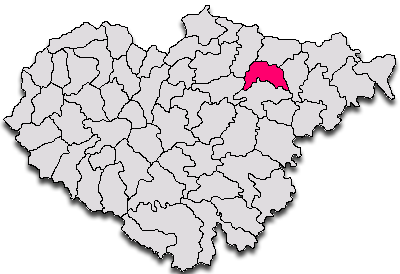
- Location in Sălaj County

- Location in Romania
- Coordinates: 47.3025°N 23.4011°E
- Country: Romania
- County: Sălaj

Government
  - Mayor (2020–2024): Dorel Vancea (PNL)
- Area: 53.89 km^{2} (20.81 sq mi)
- Elevation: 199 m (653 ft)
- Population (2021-12-01): 1,515
  - Density: 28.11/km^{2} (72.81/sq mi)
- Time zone: UTC+02:00 (EET)
  - Summer (DST): UTC+03:00 (EEST)
- Postal code: 457020
- Area code: +(40) 0260
- Vehicle reg.: SJ
- Website: comunababeni.ro

Băbeni (Hungarian: Aranymező) is a commune located in Sălaj County, Transylvania, Romania. It is composed of five villages: Băbeni, Ciocmani (Csokmány), Cliț (Csűrfalva), Piroșa (Pirosd), and Poienița (Kismező).

== Sights ==
- Wooden Church in Piroșa (built in the 19th century), historic monument
- Wooden Church in Poienița (built in the 19th century), historic monument
- Nature reserve Stanii Clițului of Cliț (16 ha (40 acres))
