= Sălaj County =

County of Romania

Sălaj County Județul Sălaj Szilágy megye
- County
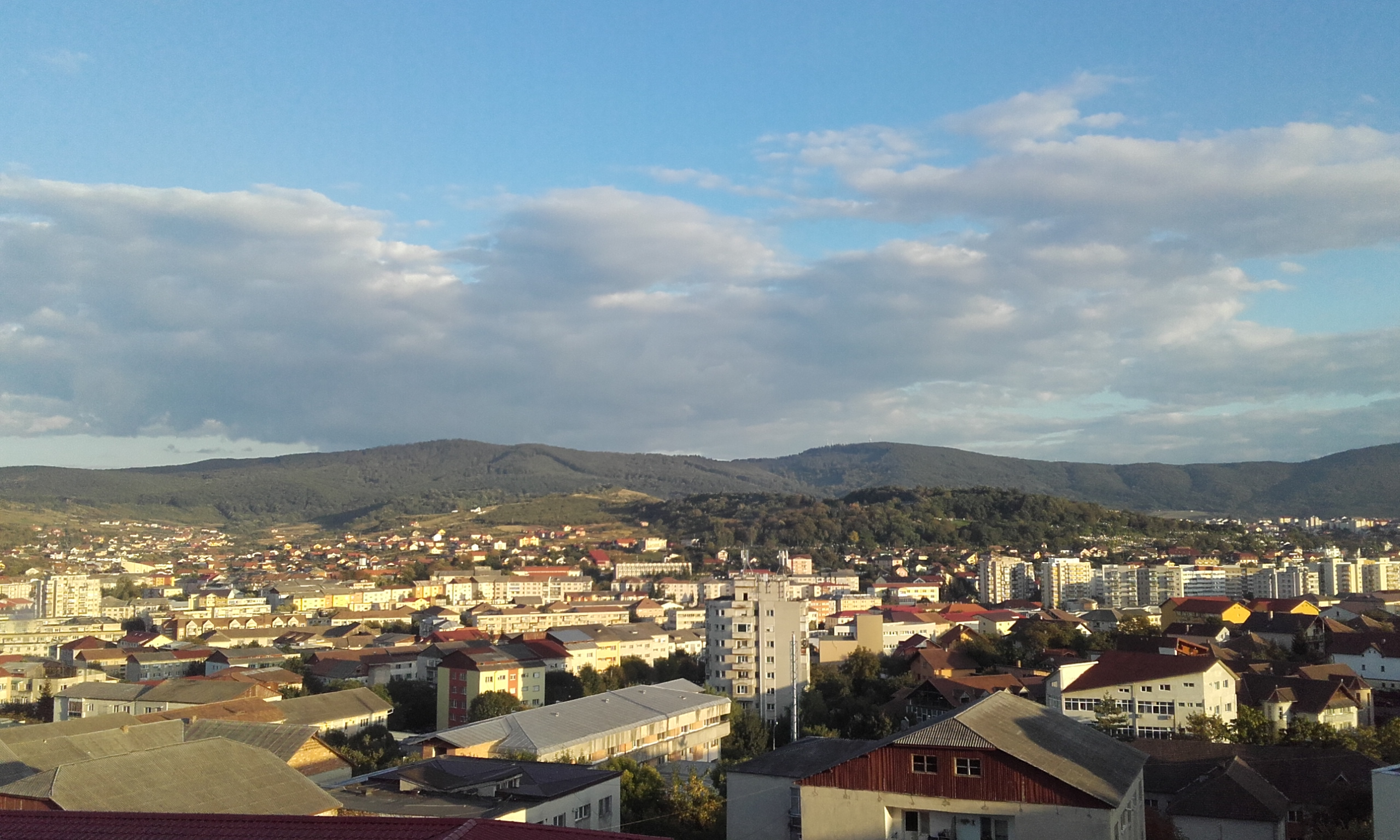
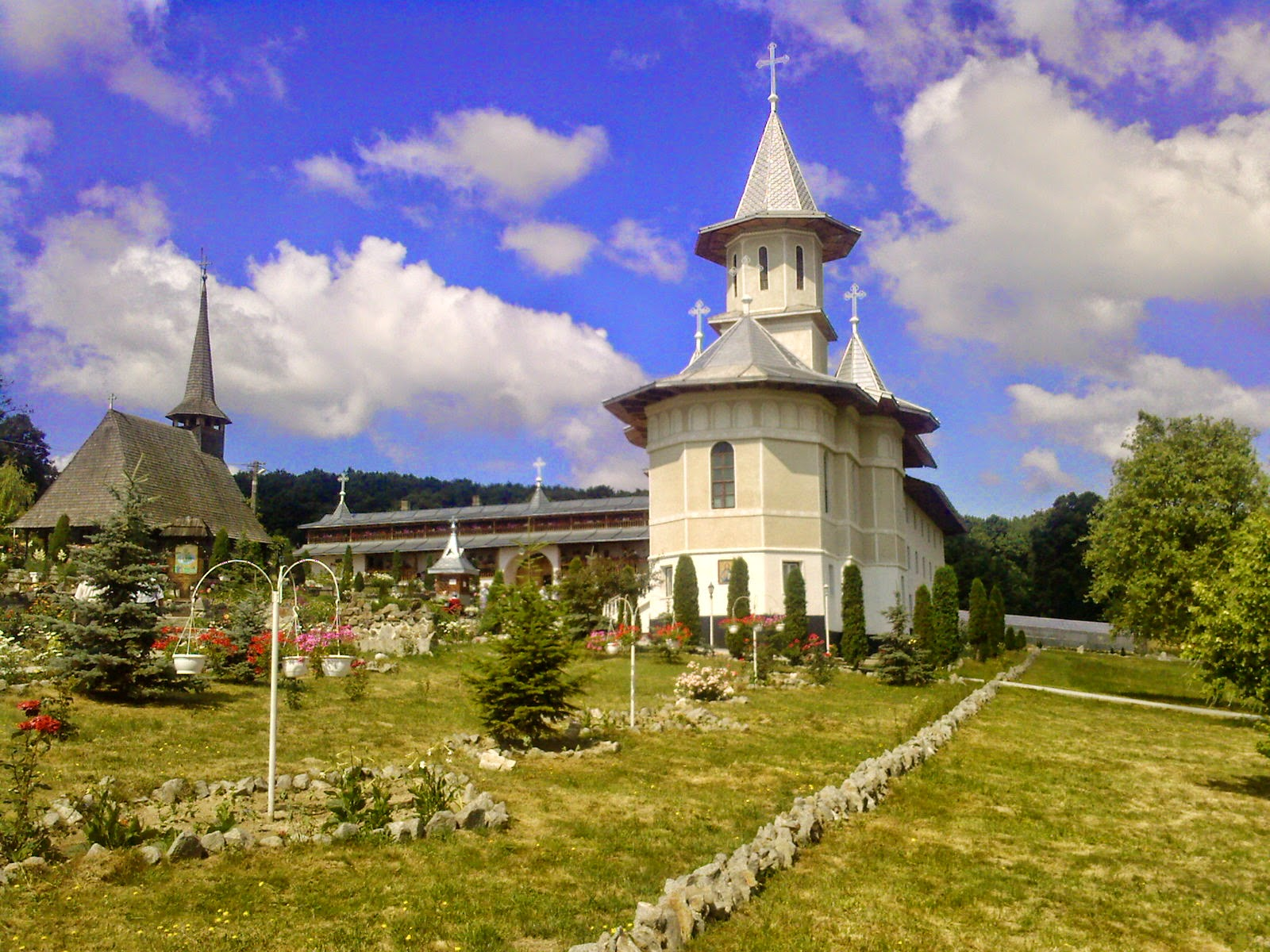
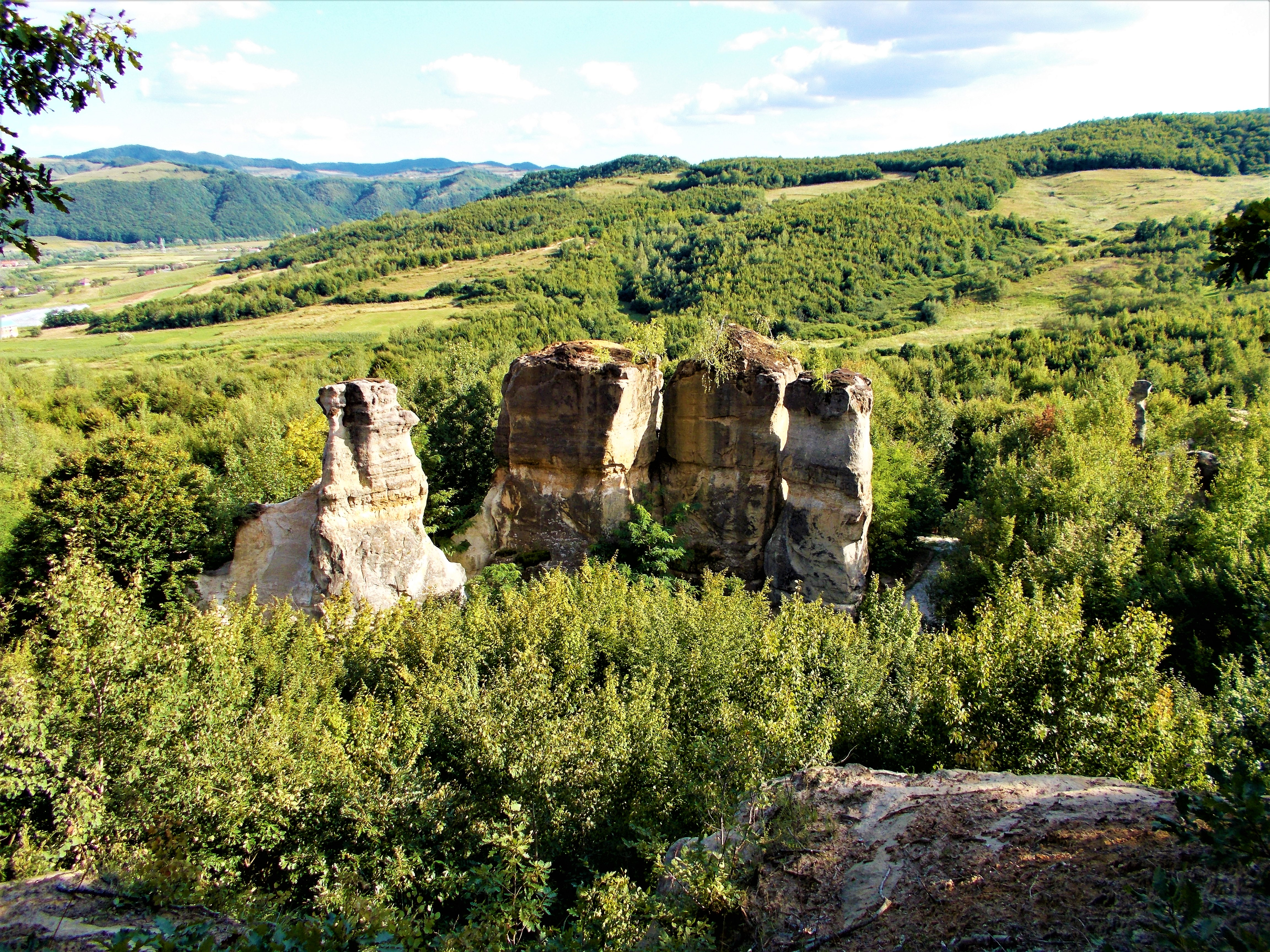
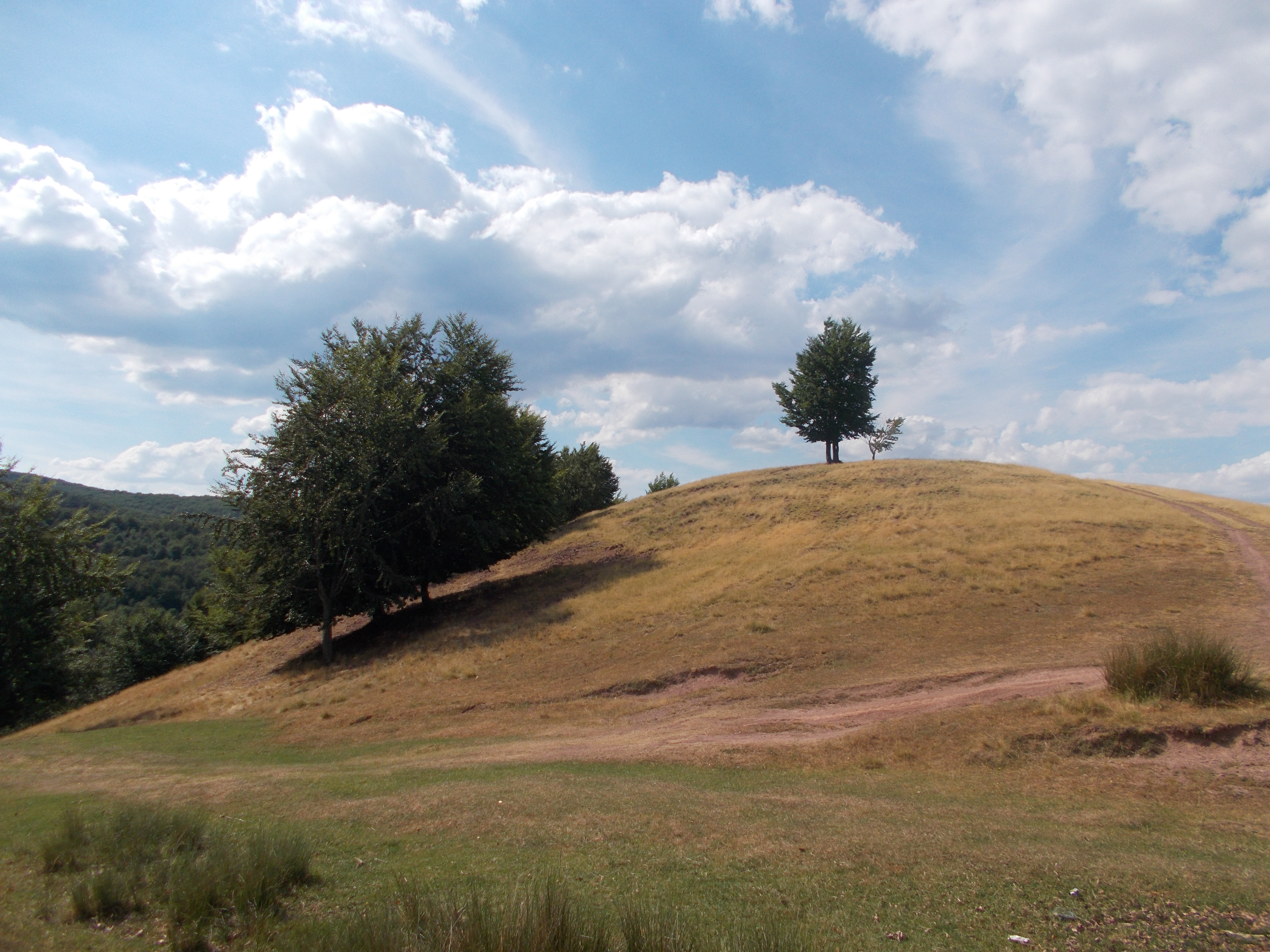
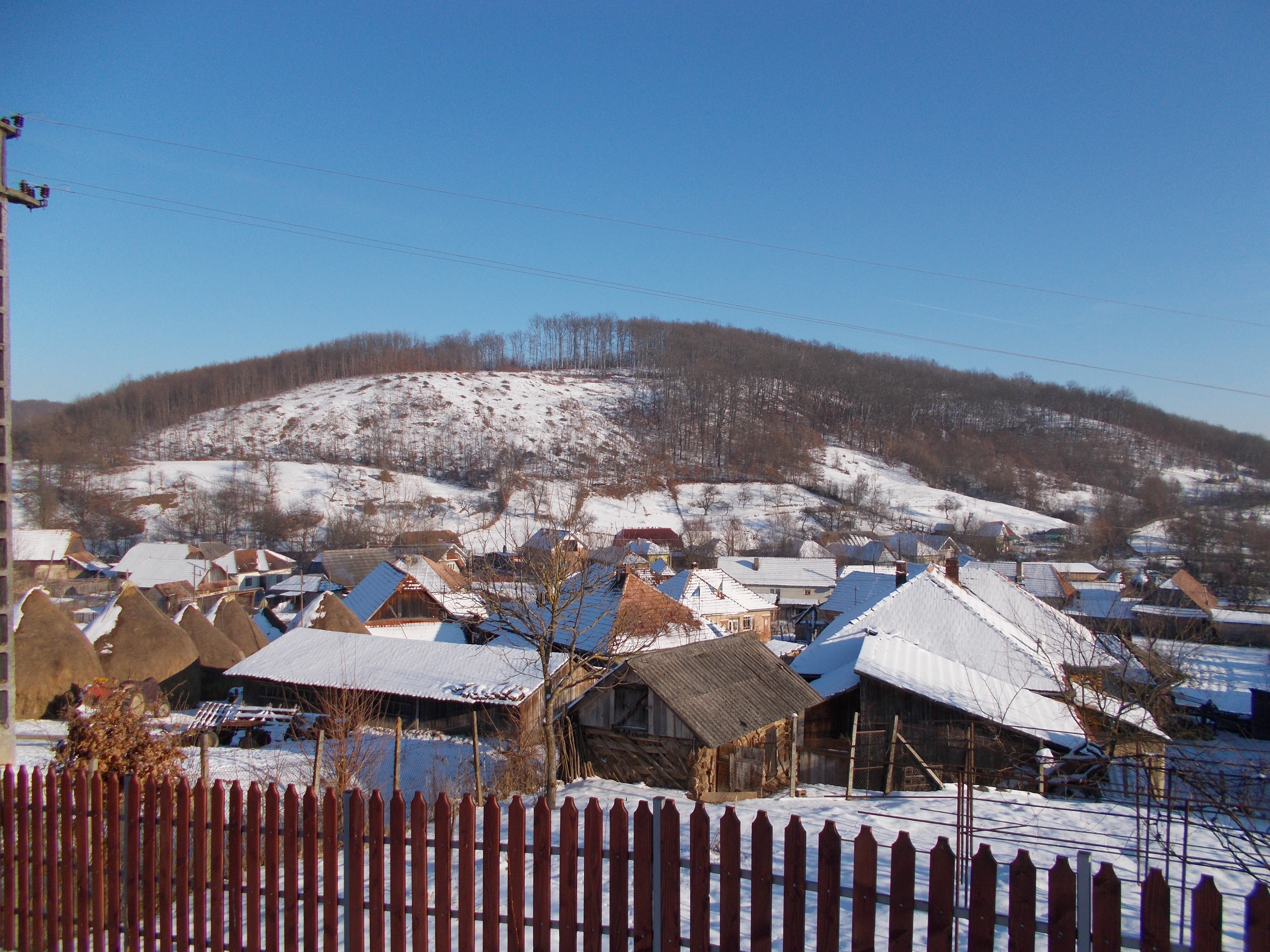
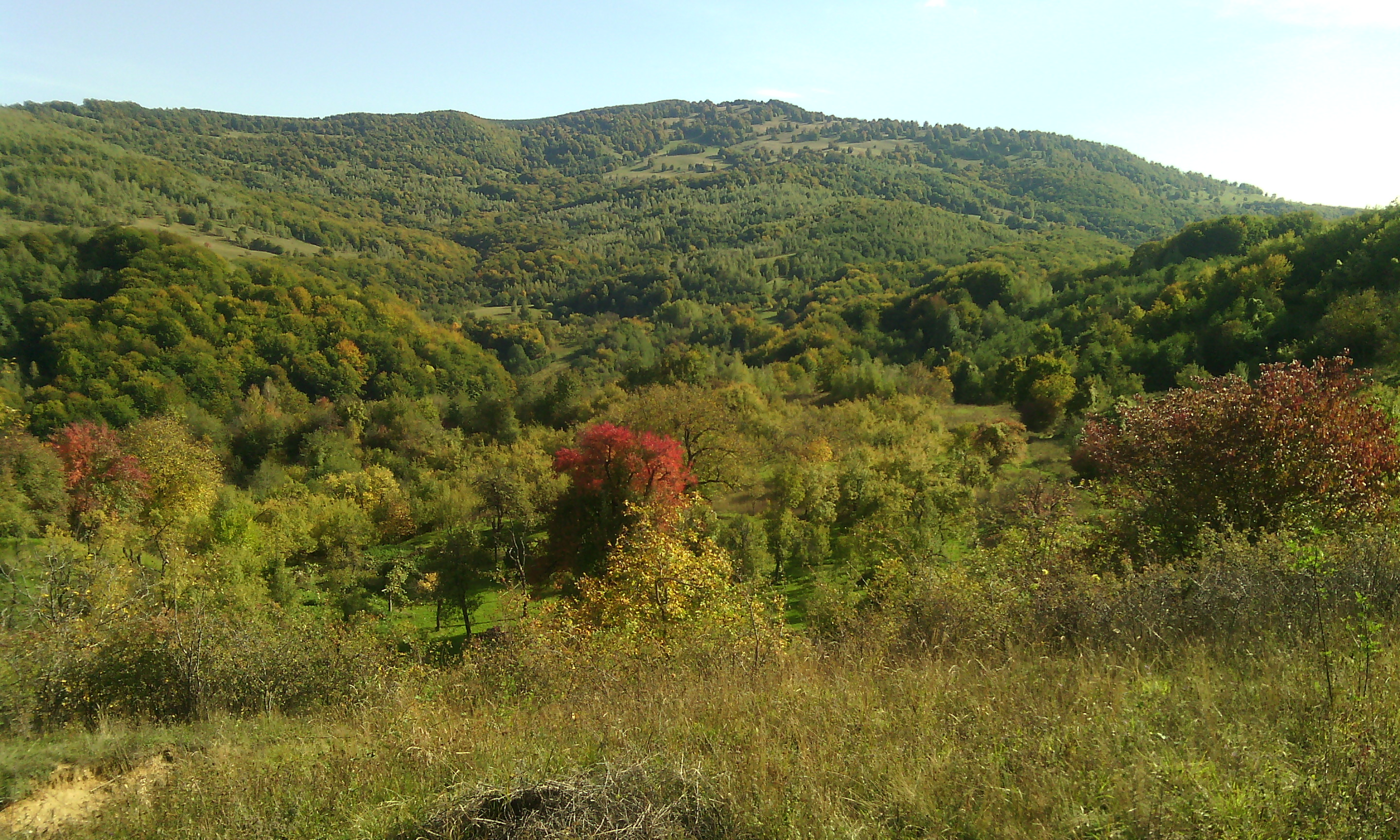
- Zalău Bic Monastery Grădina Zmeilor Tusa-Barcău Reservation Fildu de Sus Măgura Priei

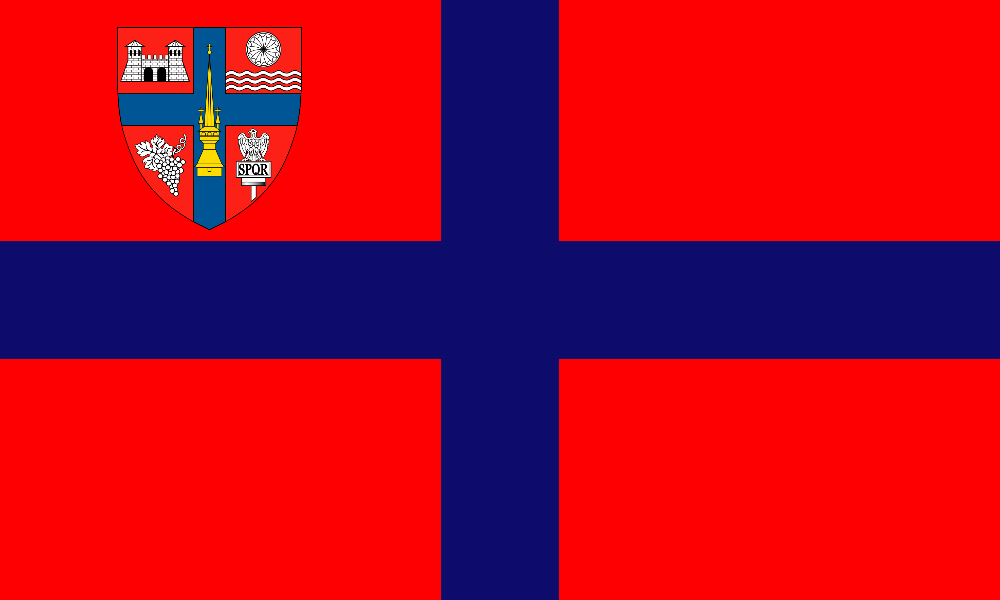
- Flag Coat of arms

- Coordinates: 47°12′N 23°3′E
- Country: Romania
- Development region: Nord-Vest
- Historical region: Crișana, Transylvania
- Capital: Zalău

Government
  - President of the County Board: Dinu Iancu-Sălăjanu (PNL)
  - Prefect: Toma Dari

Area
  - Total: 3,864.38 km^{2} (1,492.05 sq mi)
  - Rank: 38th

Population (2021-12-01)
  - Total: 212,224
  - Rank: 39th
  - Density: 54.9180/km^{2} (142.237/sq mi)
- Telephone code: (+40) 260 or (+40) 360
- ISO 3166 code: RO-SJ
- GDP (nominal): US$3.600 billion (2025)
- GDP per capita: US$16,963 (2025)
- Website: County Council; Prefecture

Sălaj County (Romanian pronunciation: [səˈlaʒ]; Hungarian: Szilágy megye) (also known as Land of Silvania, silva, -ae meaning "forest") is a county (județ) of Romania, located in the north-west of the country, in the historical regions of Crișana and Transylvania. It is bordered to the north by Satu Mare and Maramureș counties, to the west and south-west by Bihor County, and to the south-east by Cluj County. Zalău is the county seat, as well as its largest city.

== Etymology ==
The most comprehensive analysis of the origin of the county's name was authored by Gheorghe Chende-Roman in his work Toponymy: From the Onomastics of Țara Silvaniei. Referring to the name Sălaj, as well as to Zalău, which, in the author’s opinion, could have a common origin, sharing the same root (zil- or sil-). Gheorghe Chende-Roman suggests that the first origin of this root, and therefore of the name, may come from the word zilai, meaning "red or black wine," from the Dacian language. The second possibility is that it derives from the Latin term silva ("forest"), while the third is related to the Hungarian name Szilágy, which would translate as "elm creek," composed of szil ("elm") and ágy ("riverbed").

== History ==
=== Antiquity ===
On 28 July 1978, a team of speleologists discovered in the cave of Cuciulat Paleolithic paintings about 12,000 years old, unique in Romania. Called the "Romanian Altamira", this cave features several red paintings of animals, including horses and felines. These are the first manifestations of this kind known in Southeastern Europe.

The first villages in the current territory of Sălaj County are 7,500 years old. The first ceramic pots in Sălaj area are about the same age. The first houses with several rooms were built in this county about 6,000 years ago. The only fully studied Bronze Age settlement in the Romanian territory is located in Sălaj County, in Recea.

So far, 63 bronze artifacts have been discovered dating as far back as 17th–9th centuries BC. Bronze items from this period discovered in the Sălaj County are exhibited today in museums in Germany, United States, Hungary, but also Bucharest. Six defense citadels were dated to the first Iron Age, 11th–4th centuries BC.

=== Daco-Roman period and early Middle Ages ===
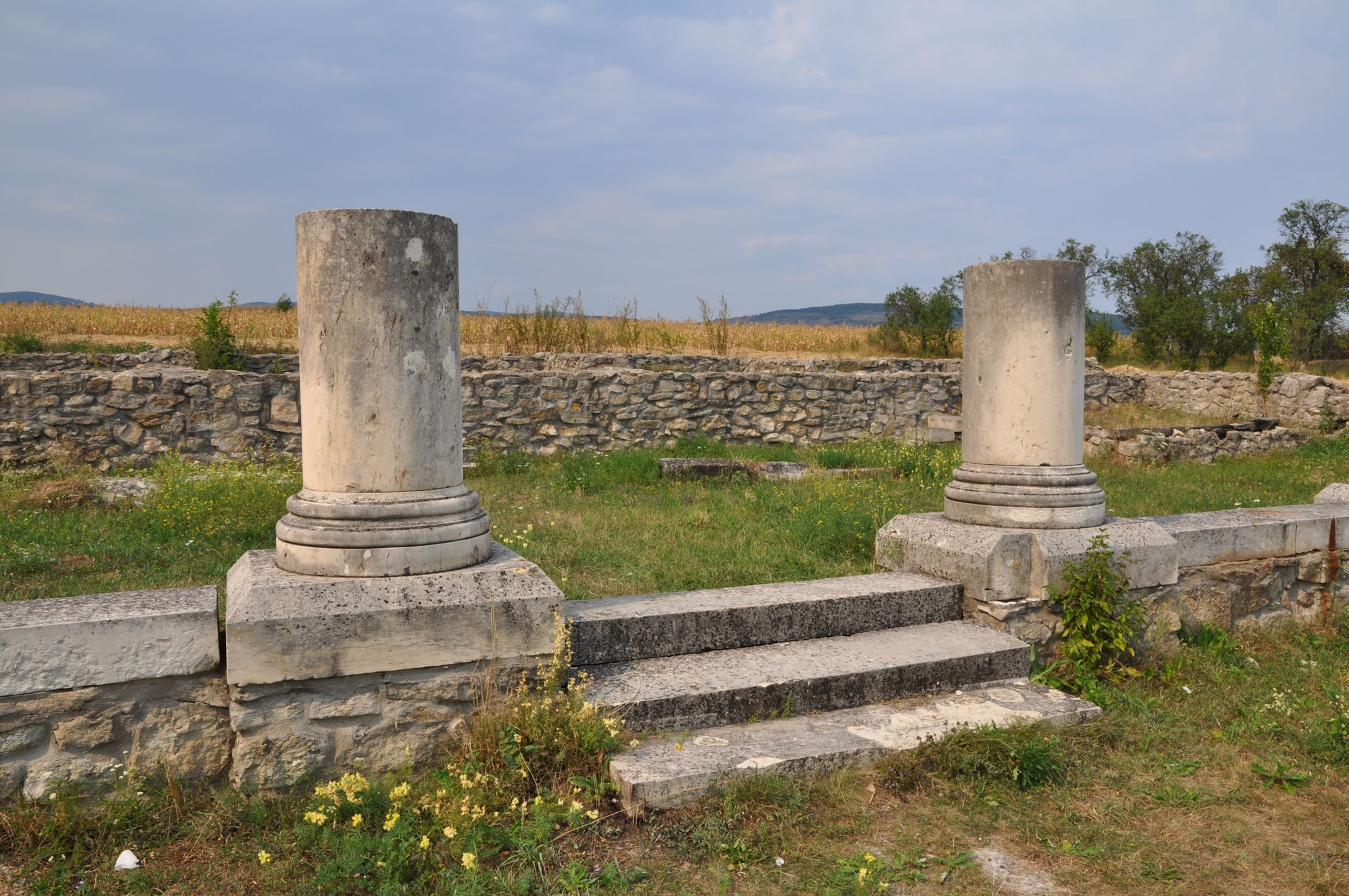
Castra of Buciumi

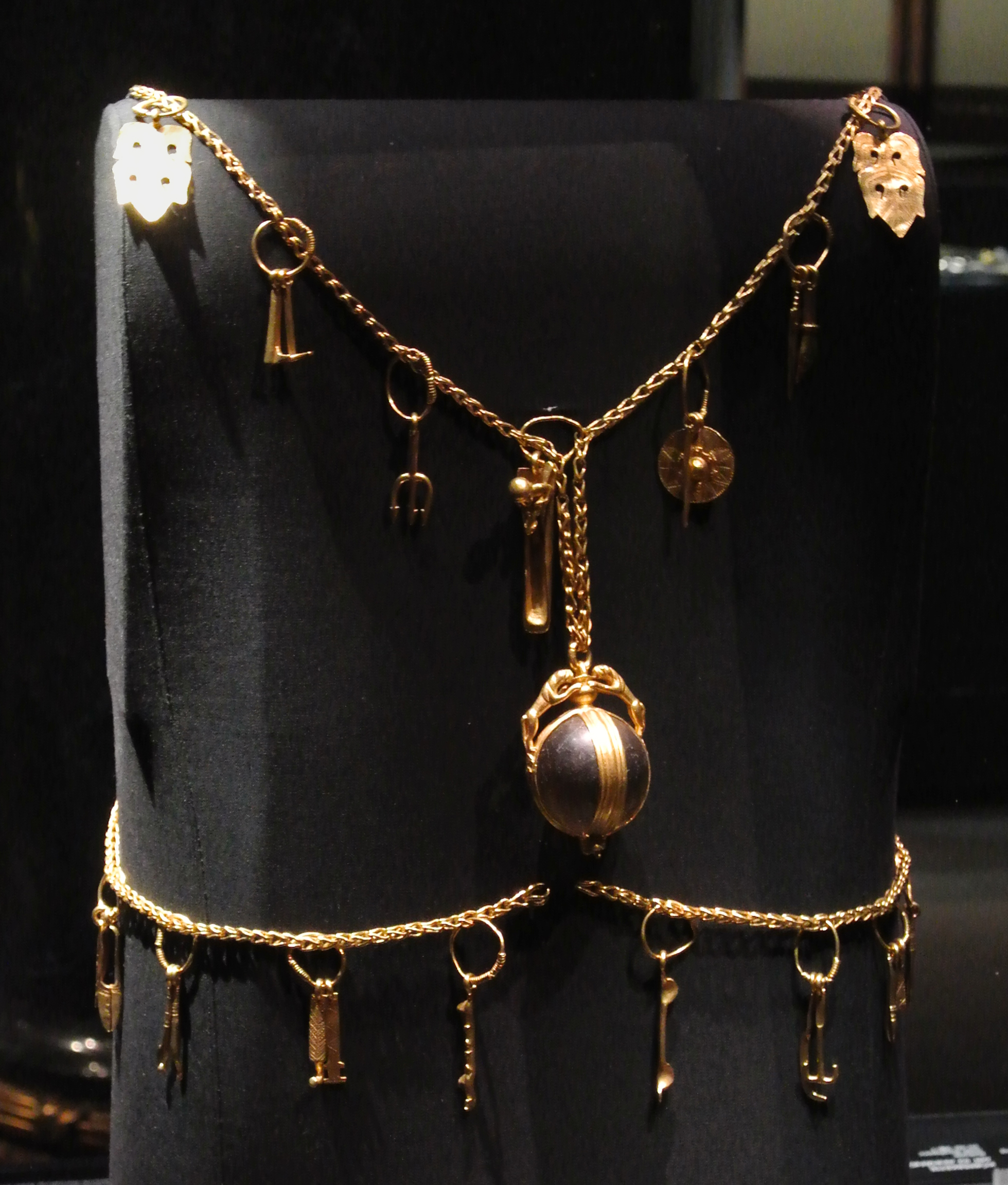
Body chain with 52 pendants, part of the treasure of Șimleu Silvaniei, is now exhibited at Kunsthistorisches Museum in Vienna.

Between the 2nd century BC and the 1st century AD, the current territory of Sălaj was occupied by Dacians. There was a Dacian tribal union between Crasna and Barcău rivers that controlled the access roads to the north-west, to and from Transylvania, as well as the commerce, especially the salt trade. From the Dacian period come no less than 23 Dacian thesauri, made of silver coins and ornaments. The 3,000 coins and 70 silver ornaments weigh in total about 13 kg (29 lb). The largest fortified Dacian settlement in Romania was discovered in Sălaj County, dating from the 1st century AD. In total, in Sălaj County were discovered sites of 30 Dacian villages and 15 Dacian citadels defending the tribal union in the west of the current county. These citadels were located on hills and were fortified with ditches and earth walls, on which were erected wooden palisades. The center of the tribal union was on Măgura Șimleului, in a complex of settlements and fortifications.

In the western half of the county, under Roman military control, subsequently settled the Vandals, which entered into an alliance with Dacians, supported by the Romans to fight other barbarians. The Vandals arrived in the area during the 1st century AD, coming from the current territory of Denmark.

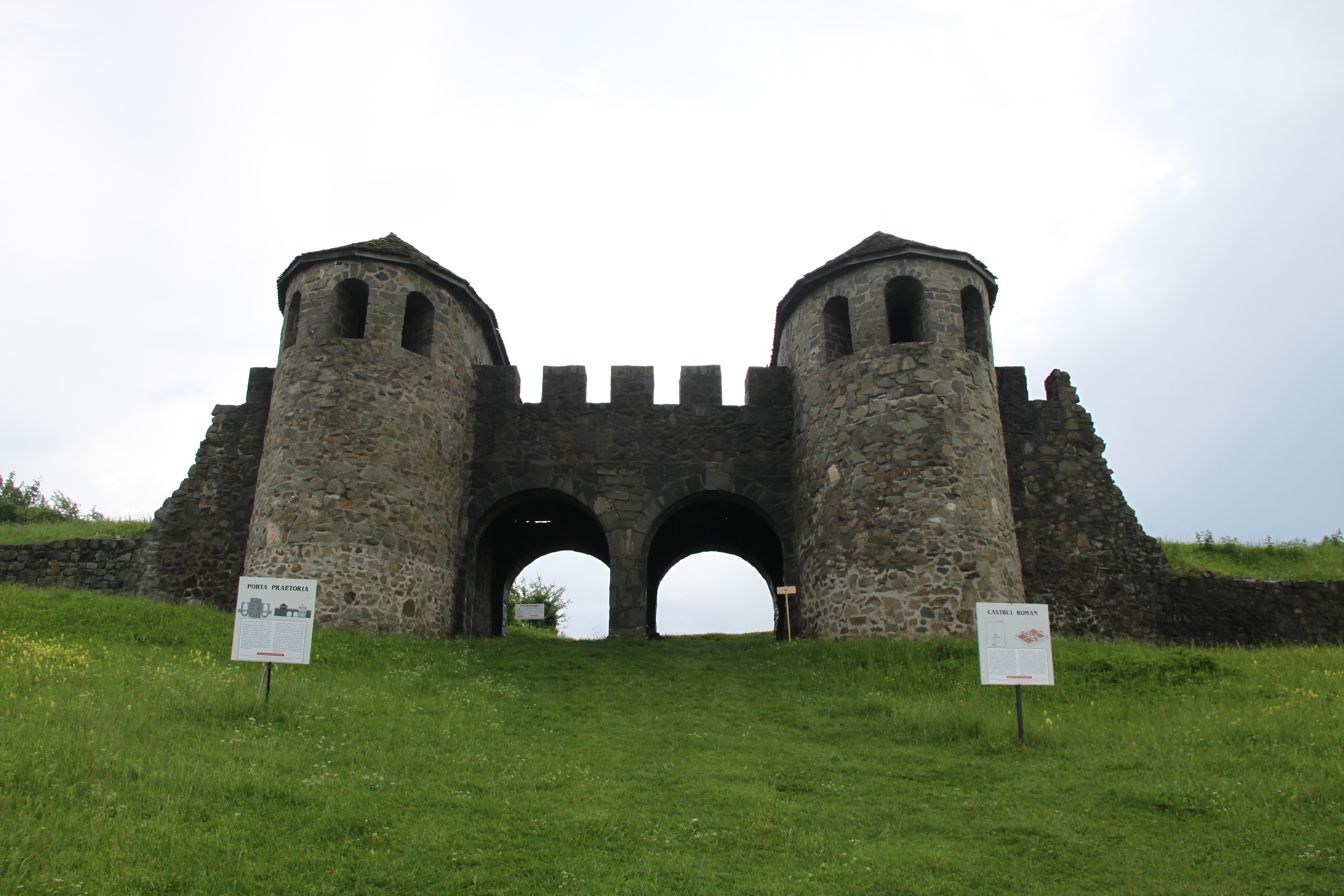
Porta Praetoria at Porolissum

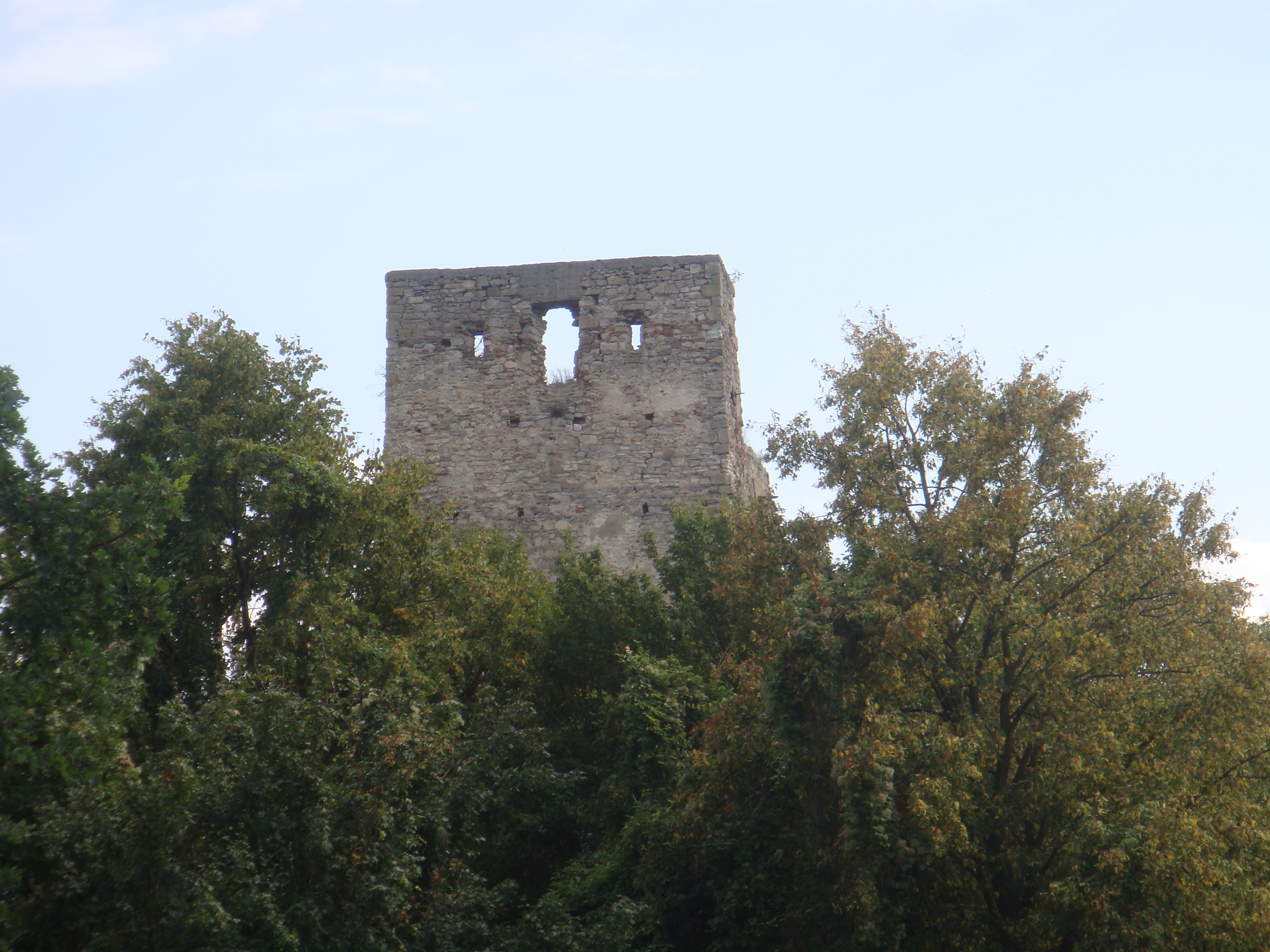
Dezső Citadel in Almașu.

After conquering Dacia, the Romans built on the place of a Dacian settlement the capital of Dacia Porolissensis, at Porolissum (current Moigrad). The capital Porolissum had about 20,000 inhabitants, defended by the militaries in the local castra. As a work of art should be mentioned the amphitheater, a scale replica of the one in Rome, with a capacity of 6,000 seats. In 214 AD, Roman Emperor Marcus Aurelius Antoninus visited Porolissum. At Porolissum was quartered for a period Cohors III Dacorum, made of ethnic Dacians, who fought as infantry.

In the Sălaj County area there were identified nine Roman castra (Certinae, Largiana, Optatiana, Porolissum, Brusturi, Buciumi, Jac, Tihău, and Zalău) and the limes (fortified border) of the province. In 275 AD, Roman authorities left the province, but indigenous people continued to live in the same territories. Their presence is attested archaeologically after the Roman imperial authorities left the region.

There followed the Gepids, which just passed through the area. Two Gepid gold thesauri discovered in Șimleu Silvaniei, weighing in total about 10 kg (22 lb) of gold and dating from the 5th century AD, are now exhibited in museums in Vienna and Budapest. In the 6th–7th centuries AD arrive in the area Slavic tribes, who find here the native population.

In the early Middle Ages, in the 10th century AD, the boundary between the voivodeship of Menumorut and that of Gelu was on Meseș Mountains. From the early medieval period come more than 100 settlements identified in the Sălaj County (7th–13th centuries). Among the first counties organized in Transylvania was Crasna County, in 1090, part of the current Sălaj County.

Byzantine chronicles and Anonymus' Gesta Hungarorum make the first mentions about Romanians in these places, about their forms of organization, as well as the first documentary attestation of Zalău (1220 as villa Ziloc).

=== Under Kingdom of Hungary ===
Starting with the second half of the 11th century, Hungarians conquer systematically Transylvania, which organizes as an autonomous Voivodate within the Kingdom of Hungary. During the Middle Ages, Transylvanian politics was monopolized by Unio Trium Nationum (a political alliance of nobles, Saxon and Székely rulers formed during the Bobâlna revolt of 1437–1438). From 1526, Transylvania is included in the Eastern Hungarian Kingdom that will become under Ottoman suzerainty, and in 1570 it transforms to the Principality of Transylvania. After 1691, the Principality is subjected to the direct rule of the Habsburgs governors. In 1765, it transformed into the Grand Principality of Transylvania. After the formation of the Austro-Hungarian Empire (1867), Transylvania disappears as a state, being incorporated again into the Kingdom of Hungary. A county with an identical name (Szilágy County, Romanian: Comitatul Sălaj) was created in 1876, covering a similar area.

In Salaj County are medieval citadels and castles which belonged to noble families (Dragu, Jibou, Gârbou, Șimleu Silvaniei, etc.). Among them is Almașu Citadel (Romanian: Cetatea Almașului) (nowadays, in ruins), built in the 13th century, a property of Transylvanian voivodes, then of Petru Rareș, Prince of Moldavia.

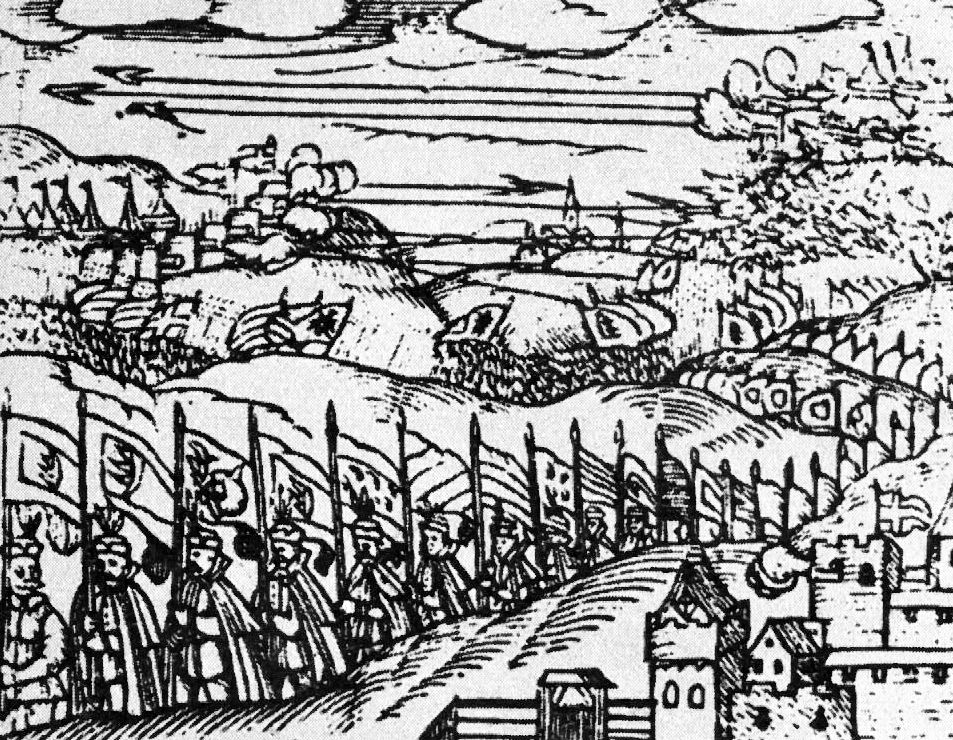
Michael the Brave defeating the Hungarians in Guruslău, 1601

The history of Salaj County includes an important episode related to historical facts of the maker of the first political union of Wallachia, Transylvania, and Moldavia under Michael the Brave. On 3 August 1601, armies led by Michael the Brave and Austrian general Giorgio Basta defeated the Hungarian noble army led by Prince Sigismund Báthory at Guruslău (Goroszló), near Zalău (Zilah) (where a memorial was erected).

At the forefront of the struggle for national rights of Romanians the often have been personalities from Sălaj County. Among the Romanian revolutionaries of 1848 can be mentioned Alexandru Papiu Ilarian and Simion Bărnuțiu, who became the ideologist of the Romanian revolution in Transylvania.

Following the establishment of the Romanian National Party in Transylvania (1869) and the adoption of "passivist" tactics (non-participation in the political life of Hungary), Sălaj leaders of the party participated in the largest protest during the political passivism period, the "Memorandist Movement" (1892–1894). Was noticed the contribution of Gheorghe Pop de Băsești. The failure of political passivism determined the PNR leaders to pass to "political activism", starting in 1905. At the stage of political activism, the Transylvanian Romanians achieved representation in the Parliament in Budapest, advocating there for national rights. In that context, there stood out the activity of Iuliu Maniu, the greatest politician in the history of Sălaj.

In the national and international favorable conditions of 1918, leaders of Romanians in Transylvania organized the Great National Assembly of Alba Iulia (1 December 1918), with plebiscitary character, which proclaimed the Union of Transylvania with Romania. Political elites in Sălaj had a leading role in the events. Gheorghe Pop de Băsești was elected president of the Great National Council (legislative body), Iuliu Maniu became president of the Governing Council (executive body), and Victor Deleu was the leader of the Interior within the Governing Council (the two institutions have led Transilvania during its provisional autonomy until April 1920).

=== After World War I ===
The territory of the county was transferred to Romania from Hungary as the successor state to Austria-Hungary in 1920 under the Treaty of Trianon. It was organized by Romanian officials as a county in 1925.

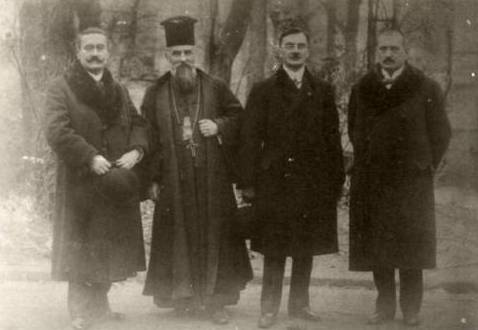
Leaders of the Romanian National Party (from left): Alexandru Vaida-Voevod, Miron Cristea and Iuliu Maniu

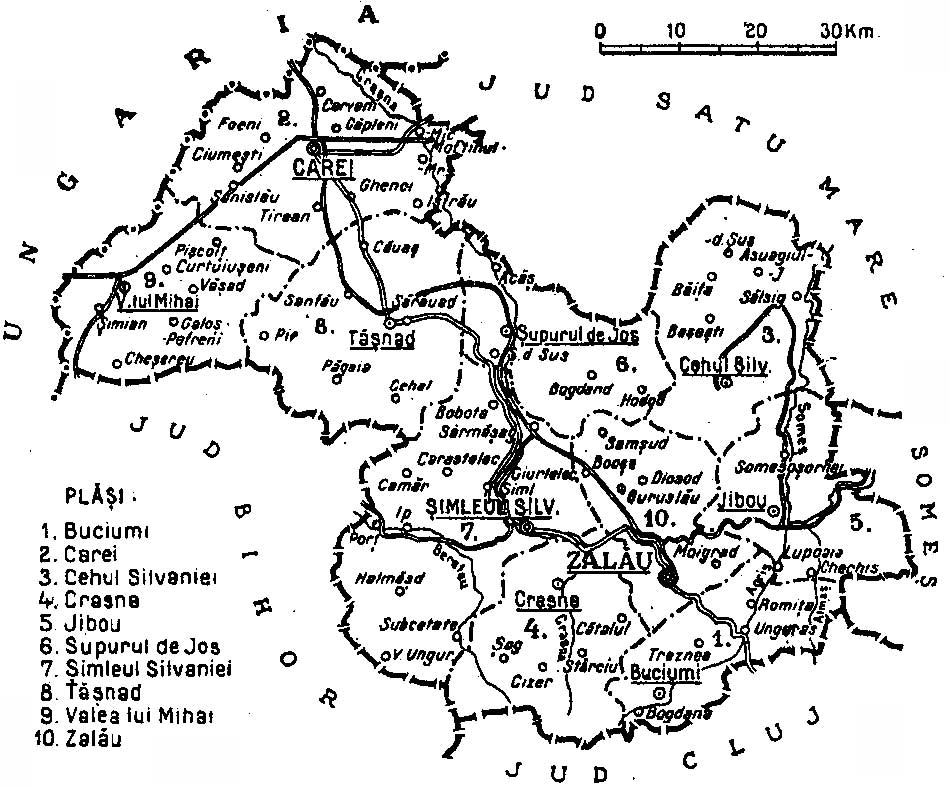
Administrative map of interwar Sălaj County

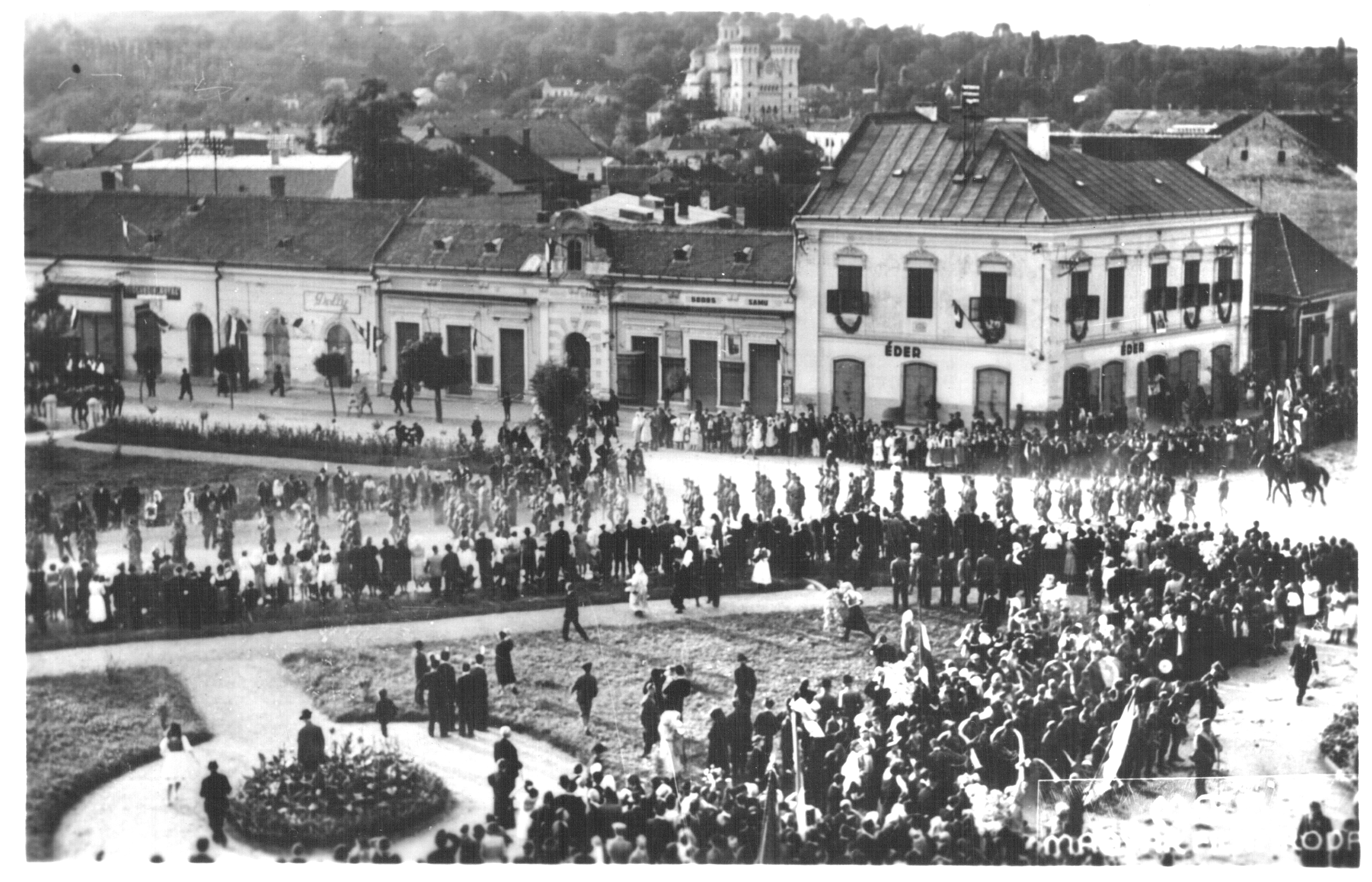
Hungarian Army troops entering in Zalău, 8 September 1940

In the interwar period, Sălaj evolved within the history of Greater Romania. Was remarked Iuliu Maniu's political activity, president of PNR, then president of PNȚ and prime minister of Romania. At the beginning of Greater Romania, Sălaj County had 3,815 km^{2} and 226,716 inhabitants, of which: 139,878 Romanians, 70,405 Hungarians, 9,322 Slovaks, 831 Jews, 6,282 other nationalities. Legislation of Greater Romania offered the possibility of functioning of schools or departments in native languages. According to documents from the State Archives, Sălaj County, in 1933 had 342,642 inhabitants, of which: 202,176 Romanians, 90,800 Hungarians, 30,840 Germans, 17,138 Jews, 1,715 other nationalities. The number of students was: 44,921 Romanians, 20,192 Hungarians, 3,287 Germans, 2,111 Jews, 396 other nationalities.

In 1938, King Carol II promulgated a new Constitution, and subsequently, he had the administrative division of the Romanian territory changed. 10 ținuturi (approximate translation: "lands") were created (by merging the counties) to be ruled by rezidenți regali (approximate translation: "Royal Residents") - appointed directly by the King - instead of the prefects. Sălaj County became part of Ținutul Crișuri.

By Second Vienna Award, concluded on 30 August 1940, arbitrated by Nazi Germany and Fascist Italy, Romania had to cede to Hungary Northern Transylvania. Until March 1945, when the ceded part will return to Romania (during Petru Groza government), Sălaj was part of Hungary again. Between 1940 and 1944, in Szilágy County notable incidents happened, claiming the lives of 495 people, most of them culminating in the Ip and Treznea massacres. Beginning in 1944, Romanian forces with Soviet assistance recaptured the ceded territory and reintegrated it into Romania, re-establishing the county. Starting with 14 October 1944, Romanian armies carried military operations in the territory, however, the Romanian administration was expelled from these territories in October due to the activities of the Romanian paramilitary groups created in the area to avenge the atrocities committed by the Hungarians against the Romanians during the Hungarian rule in Northern Transylvania. Romanian jurisdiction over the county per the Treaty of Trianon was reaffirmed in the Paris Peace Treaties, 1947.

After 1947, Sălaj inhabitants have experienced the realities of the Communist totalitarian regime. Among Sălaj personalities, can be mentioned artist Ioan Sima who, in 1980, donated to the County Museum of History and Art in Zalău paintings and graphics, personal archive and his library of art.

The county was disestablished by the communist government of Romania in 1950 and re-established in 1968 when Romania restored the county administrative system.

After December 1989, in the conditions of return to a democratic political regime and Euro-Atlantic integration, Sălaj has become a model of interethnic cohabitation, also manifested in education. Politically, was remarked the activity of Corneliu Coposu, the former personal secretary of Iuliu Maniu. His name links to the clotting of the Romanian Democratic Convention that succeeded the first democratic alternation in power in post-revolutionary Romania.

== Geography ==

Sălaj County unfolds on 3,864.38 km^{2} (1.6% of the country area), of which 239,613 ha are agricultural land, 105,833 ha forests and 41,000 ha inhabited area. It is located in the north-west of the country, overlapping mostly in the area of connection between the Eastern Carpathians and Apuseni Mountains, known as "Someș Plateau".

=== Relief ===
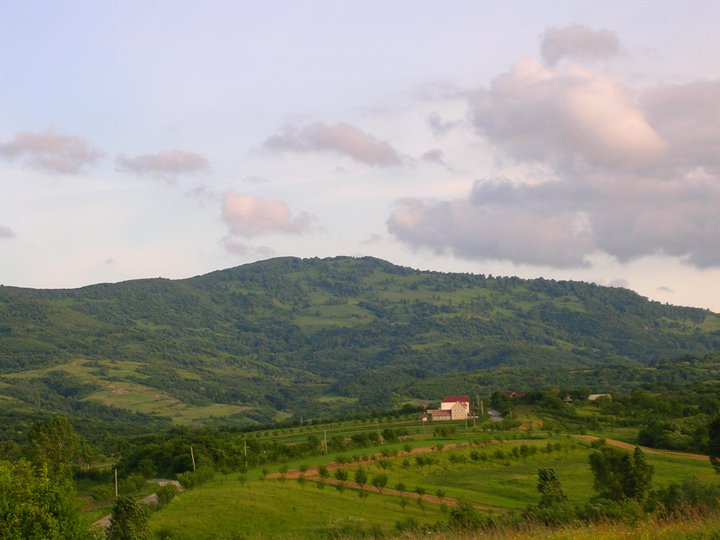
Măgura Priei, the highest point of the county

The relief is predominantly hilly, mountains occupying a small portion in the south-west. The hilly area is composed of the Someș Plateau and piedmont hills of Silvania. The mountainous area is represented by two northern branches of the Apuseni Mountains: Meseș with Măgura Priei Peak (996 m) and Plopiș. Depressions are widely distributed throughout the county and represent important agricultural areas of concentration of settlements.

=== Climate ===
In terms of climate, Sălaj County, by its geographical position, falls in moderate temperate continental climate, west and north-west circulation predominating.

The thermal regime of the air is conditioned by altitude, fragmentation and orientation of relief, plus local factors, the average temperature being around 8 °C. Average temperature at Zalău (calculated for the period 1961–1990) is 9.5 °C, remarking a growing trend of it. The maximum temperature recorded at the Zalău meteorological station was 38 °C on 16 August 1952, and the minimum temperature recorded is -23.5 °C, on 25 January 1954.

The annual rainfall regime is generated by two factors: general atmospheric circulation, physical and geographical conditions, respectively. Advection of temperate oceanic air from west and north-west direction, especially during the summer, as well as frequent ingress of cold air masses from the north or those temperate continental from north-east and east, during the winter, plus advection of maritime tropical air from the south-west and south, explain all influences of atmospheric action centres which are felt in this area. Taking into account these elements, plus relief influences, atmospheric rainfall are unevenly spread across the county. The average amount of precipitation is 600–700 mm, in Zalău being 634.2 mm (calculated for the period 1961–1990). The most abundant precipitation falls in summer, when besides frontal processes occurs the intense thermal convection, causing showers, rich in terms of quantity. During the winter, rainfall is less quantitatively, although the number of days with precipitation is not smaller. By and large, the pluviometric maximum overlaps the months of May–June, and the pluviometric minimum is registered in January–February.

Climate data for Zalău
| Month | Jan | Feb | Mar | Apr | May | Jun | Jul | Aug | Sep | Oct | Nov | Dec | Year |
|---|---|---|---|---|---|---|---|---|---|---|---|---|---|
| Mean daily maximum °C (°F) | 0.9 (33.6) | 3.8 (38.8) | 9.4 (48.9) | 15.3 (59.5) | 20.5 (68.9) | 23.2 (73.8) | 25.2 (77.4) | 25 (77) | 21.3 (70.3) | 5.8 (42.4) | 8.5 (47.3) | 2.9 (37.2) | 13.5 (56.3) |
| Mean daily minimum °C (°F) | −5.1 (22.8) | −2.8 (27.0) | 1.1 (34.0) | 5.8 (42.4) | 10.2 (50.4) | 12.9 (55.2) | 14.2 (57.6) | 13.9 (57.0) | 10.8 (51.4) | 6.1 (43.0) | 1.9 (35.4) | −2.5 (27.5) | 5.5 (42.0) |
| Average precipitation mm (inches) | 35.4 (1.39) | 28.5 (1.12) | 34.5 (1.36) | 52.4 (2.06) | 77.3 (3.04) | 99.1 (3.90) | 72.2 (2.84) | 74.8 (2.94) | 39.7 (1.56) | 34.6 (1.36) | 42 (1.7) | 43.8 (1.72) | 634.3 (24.99) |
Source 1: Meteo Plus
Source 2:

=== Hydrographic network ===
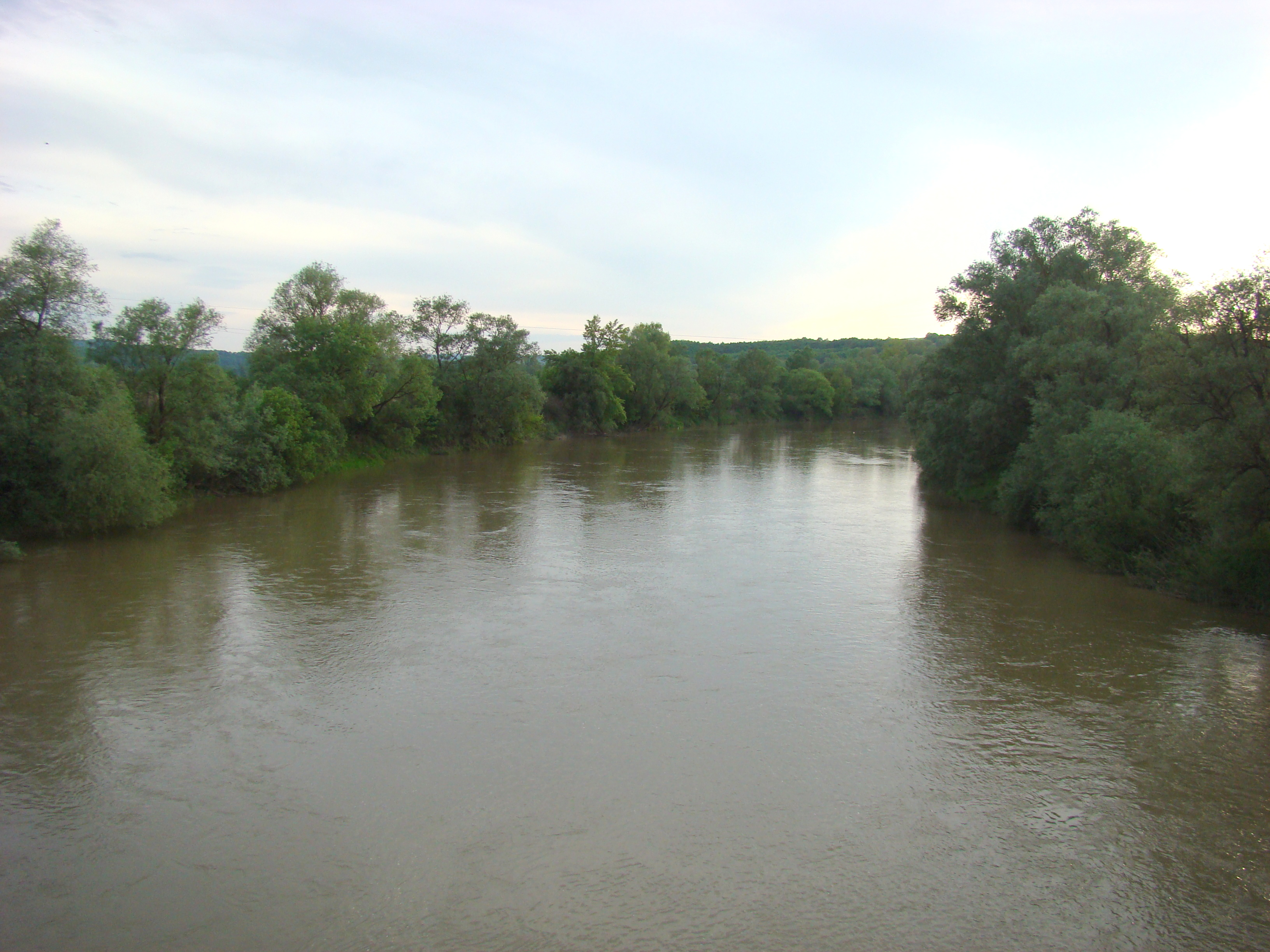
Someș at Letca

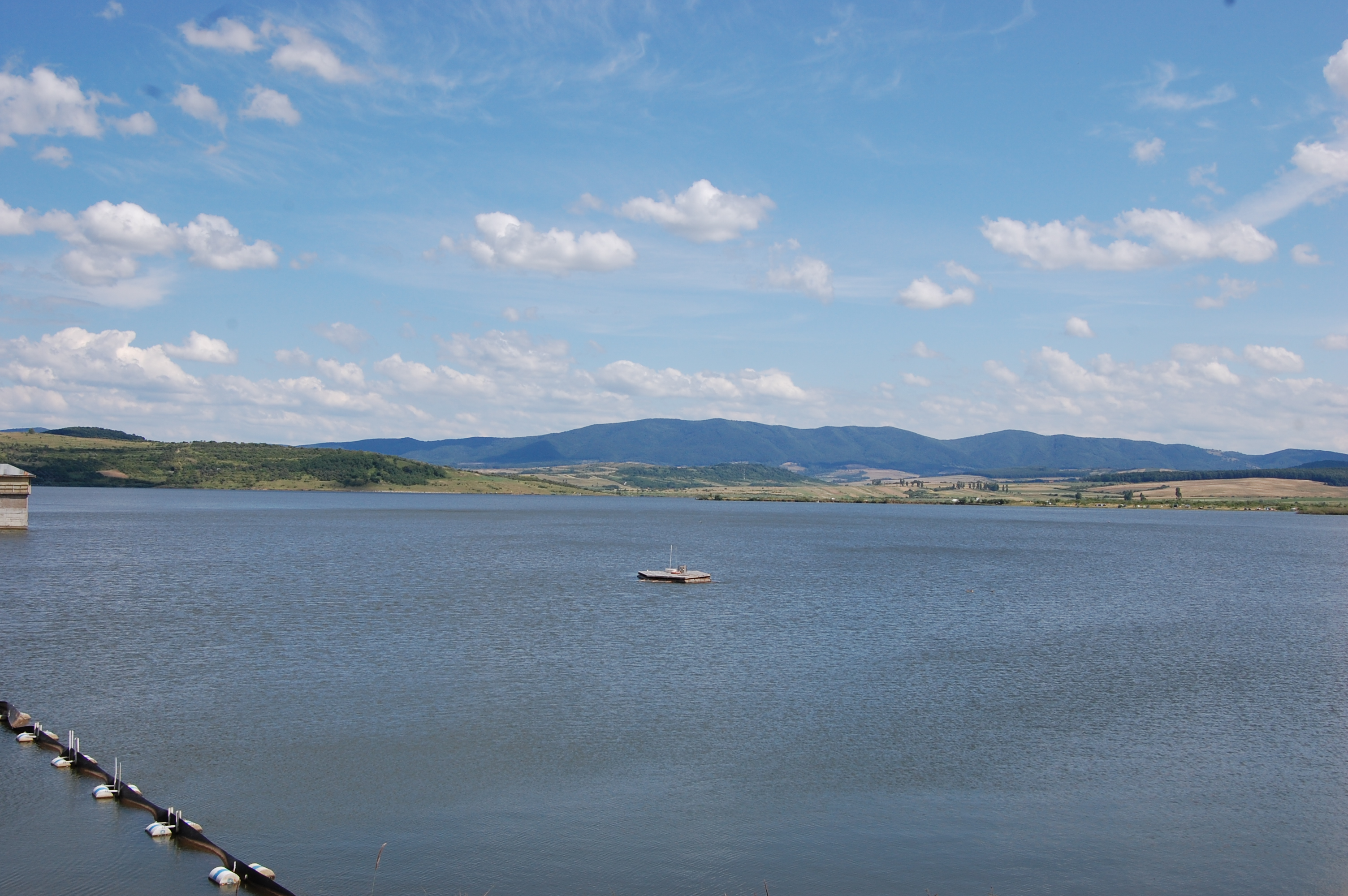
Vârșolț Reservoir

Hydrographic network of the county has a length of 1,263.7 km, of which the Someș is 95 km within the county, Almaș 68 km, Agrij 48 km, Crasna 71 km, Barcău 54 km. Water covers 57.8 km^{2}, representing 1.5% of the county area.

=== Flora ===
Sălaj landscape presents areas with forests of oak, sessile, beech and other deciduous, pastures and agricultural land planted with vines, fruit trees, grain alternating with anthropogenic landscapes.

== Demography ==
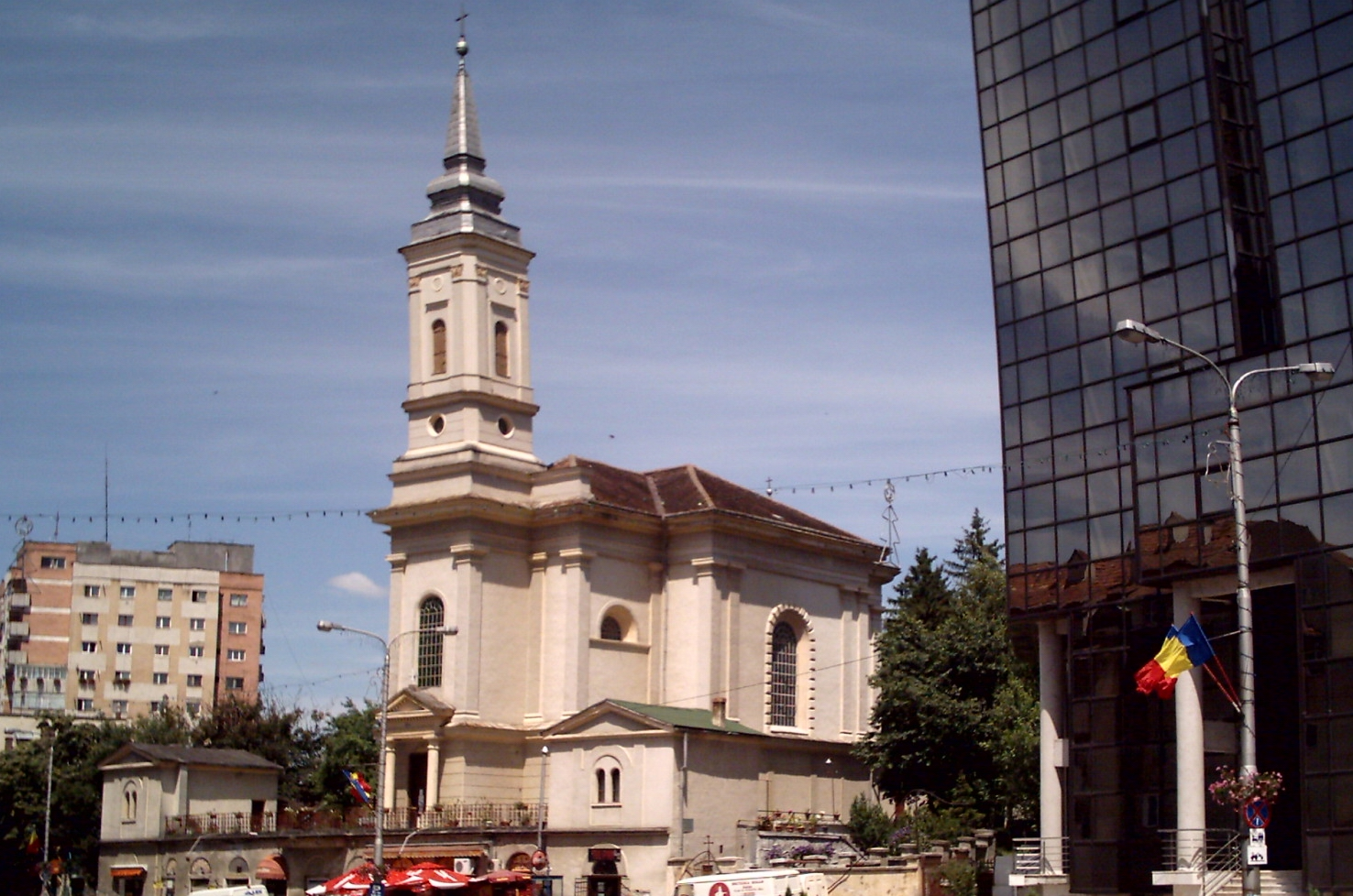
Zalău, the largest city in Sălaj County

Ethnic composition of Sălaj County in 2021
1. Romanians (70.1%)
2. Hungarians (20.8%)
3. Roma (8.58%)
4. Slovaks (0.39%)
5. Others (0.12%)

At the 2021 census, the county had a population of 212,224 inhabitants and a density of 56/km^{2} (150/sq mi). Sălaj County ranks third nationally as one of the counties with the lowest number of inhabitants.

The ethnic structure of the county includes: Romanians (136,552) – 70.09%, Hungarians (40,554) – 20.82%, Romani (16,706) – 8.58%, Slovaks (760) – 0.39%, and other nationalities (236). Additionally, 17,416 have not declared their ethnicity.

| Census | | Ethnicity |
| Year | Population | Romanians | Hungarians | Romani | Germans | Slovaks | Jews | Others | Unspecified |
|---|---|---|---|---|---|---|---|---|---|
| 1930 | 240,778 | 167,936 | 55,611 | 4,446 | 204 | 4,539 | 7,749 | 249 | 44 |
| 1956 | 271,989 +13% | 199,900 +19% | 66,935 +20.4% | 2,092 −52.9% | 40 −80.4% | 2,154 −52.5% | 772 −90% | 83 | 13 |
| 1966 | 263,103 −3.3% | 194,790 −2.6% | 63,850 −4.6% | 1,779 −15% | 72 +80% | 2,357 +9.4% | 88 −88.6% | 130 | 37 |
| 1977 | 264,569 +0.6% | 194,420 −0.2% | 64,017 +0.3% | 3,920 +120.3% | 122 +69.4% | 1,929 −18.2% | 40 −54.5% | 120 | 1 |
| 1992 | 266,797 +0.8% | 192,552 −1% | 63,151 −1.4% | 9,224 +135.3% | 146 +19.7% | 1,608 −16.6% | 24 −40% | 92 | – |
| 2002 | 248,015 −7% | 176,671 −8.2% | 57,167 −9.5% | 12,544 +36% | 102 −30.1% | 1,366 −15% | 12 −50% | 140 | 13 |
| 2011 | 224,384 −9.5% | 148,396 −16% | 50,177 −12.2% | 15,004 +19.6% | 57 −44.1% | 1,118 −18.2% | 5 −58.3% | 160 | 9,467 |

99.8% declared their affiliation to a religion, people who were atheists or without religion representing only 0.2%.

| Religion | People | Percentage |
|---|---|---|
| Orthodox | 138,032 | 64.4% |
| Reformed | 42,128 | 19.6% |
| Pentecostal | 10,358 | 4.8% |
| Baptist | 8,293 | 3.9% |
| Greek Catholic | 5,726 | 2.7% |
| Roman Catholic | 5,340 | 2.5% |

Historical population

| Year | Pop. | ±% p.a. |
|---|---|---|
| 1880 | 159,872 | — |
| 1890 | 180,145 | +1.20% |
| 1900 | 193,996 | +0.74% |
| 1910 | 230,140 | +1.72% |
| 1930 | 343,347 | +2.02% |

| Year | Pop. | ±% p.a. |
|---|---|---|
| 1948 | 262,580 | −1.48% |
| 1956 | 271,989 | +0.44% |
| 1966 | 263,103 | −0.33% |
| 1977 | 264,569 | +0.05% |
| 1989 | 268,776 | +0.13% |

| Year | Pop. | ±% p.a. |
|---|---|---|
| 1992 | 266,308 | −0.31% |
| 2002 | 248,015 | −0.71% |
| 2011 | 224,384 | −1.11% |
| 2021 | 212,224 | −0.56% |

== Economy ==
=== Industry ===
Sălaj County has rich natural resources of raw materials, concentrated in the following areas:

- brown coal – Cristolțel;
- lignite – Ip and Sărmășag;
- carbonaceous slate – Zimbor;
- gypsum – Treznea;
- alabaster – Gălășeni and Stâna;
- diorite – Moigrad;
- mica-schist – Marca;
- chalk – Cuciulat, Glod, Prodănești and Răstoci;
- clay – Crasna, Cuciulat, Nușfalău and Zalău;
- kaolin sand – Jac and Var;
- silica sand – Jac, Creaca, Surduc and Var;
- quartz sand – Var;
- kaolin – Ruginoasa;
- tuff – Mirșid;
- river aggregates – Benesat, Var, Rona, Almașu, Băbeni, Cuciulat, Glod, Gâlgău, Ileanda, Românași, Rus, Someș-Odorhei, Surduc and Tihău.

== Education ==
Of the total resident population of 10 years and over 47.8% had low levels of education (primary, gymnasium or no school graduated), 41.4% intermediate levels (postgraduate and vocational, high school or professional and apprentice) and 10.8% higher levels.

The number of people with higher education increased by 2.3 times in 2011 compared to 2002, and that of people with low levels of education decreased by 24.9%. On 20 October 2011, the share of illiterate persons in the total population of 10 years and over was 1.8%, 1.2% lower than in the 2002 census.

== Politics ==
The Sălaj County Council, renewed at the 2024 local elections, consists of 30 councilors, with the following party composition:

| Party | Seats | Current County Council |
|---|---|---|
| National Liberal Party (PNL) | 11 | |
| Social Democratic Party (PSD) | 9 | |
| Democratic Alliance of Hungarians (UDMR/RMDSZ) | 8 | |
| Alliance for the Union of Romanians (AUR) | 2 | |

== Administrative divisions ==
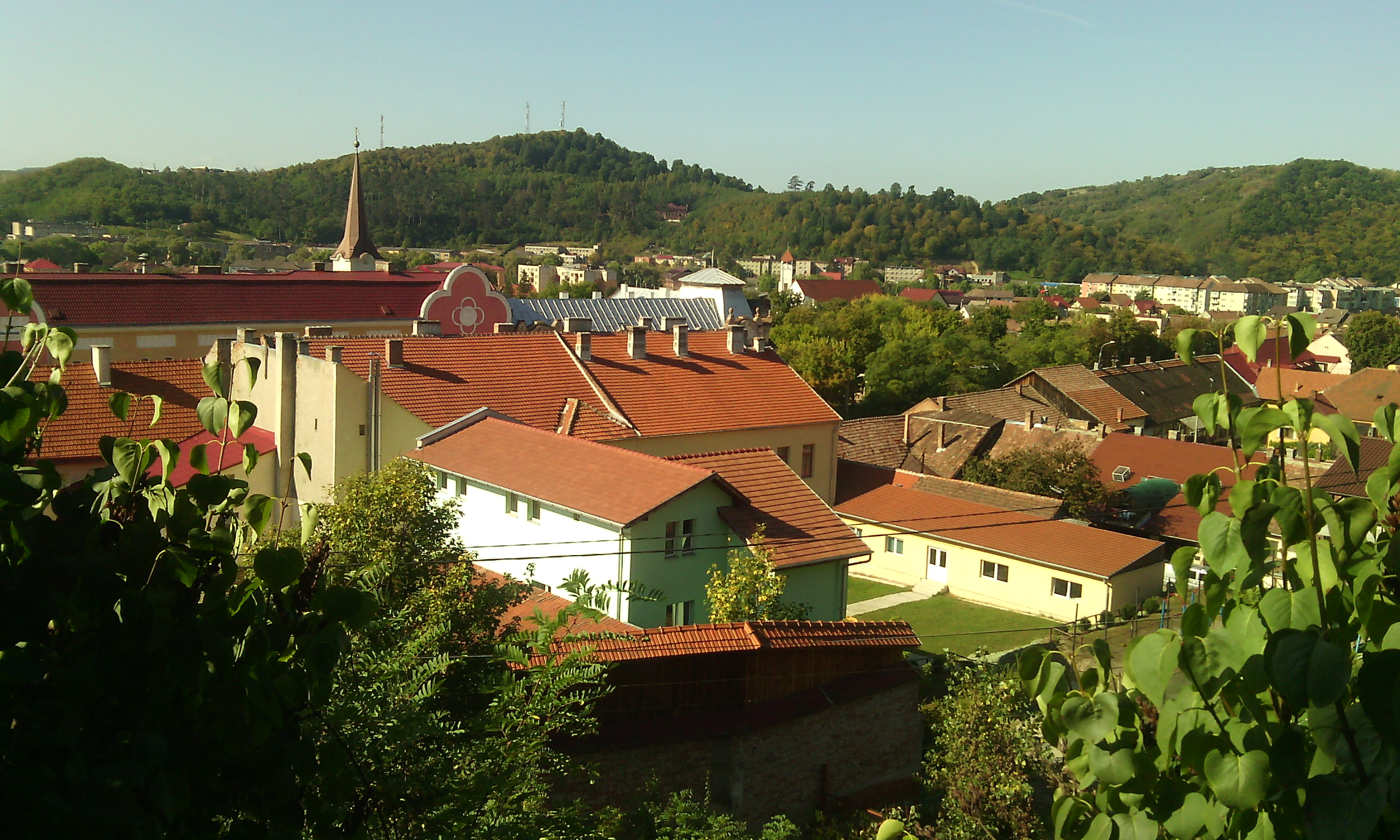
Șimleu Silvaniei

Sălaj County has 1 municipality, 3 towns and 57 communes, subdivided into 281 villages.

Municipalities

- Zalău – capital city; population: 56,202

Towns

- Cehu Silvaniei – population: 7,214
- Jibou – population: 10,407
- Șimleu Silvaniei – population: 14,436

Communes

- Agrij
- Almașu
- Băbeni
- Bălan
- Bănișor
- Benesat
- Bobota
- Bocșa
- Boghiș
- Buciumi
- Camăr
- Carastelec
- Chieșd
- Cizer
- Coșeiu
- Crasna
- Creaca
- Crișeni
- Cristolț
- Cuzăplac
- Dobrin
- Dragu
- Fildu de Jos
- Gâlgău
- Gârbou
- Halmășd
- Hereclean
- Hida
- Horoatu Crasnei
- Ileanda
- Ip
- Letca
- Lozna
- Măeriște
- Marca
- Meseșenii de Jos
- Mirșid
- Năpradea
- Nușfalău
- Pericei
- Plopiș
- Poiana Blenchii
- Românași
- Rus
- Sălățig
- Sâg
- Sânmihaiu Almașului
- Someș-Odorhei
- Surduc
- Șamșud
- Sărmășag
- Șimișna
- Treznea
- Valcău de Jos
- Vârșolț
- Zalha
- Zimbor

== Personalities ==
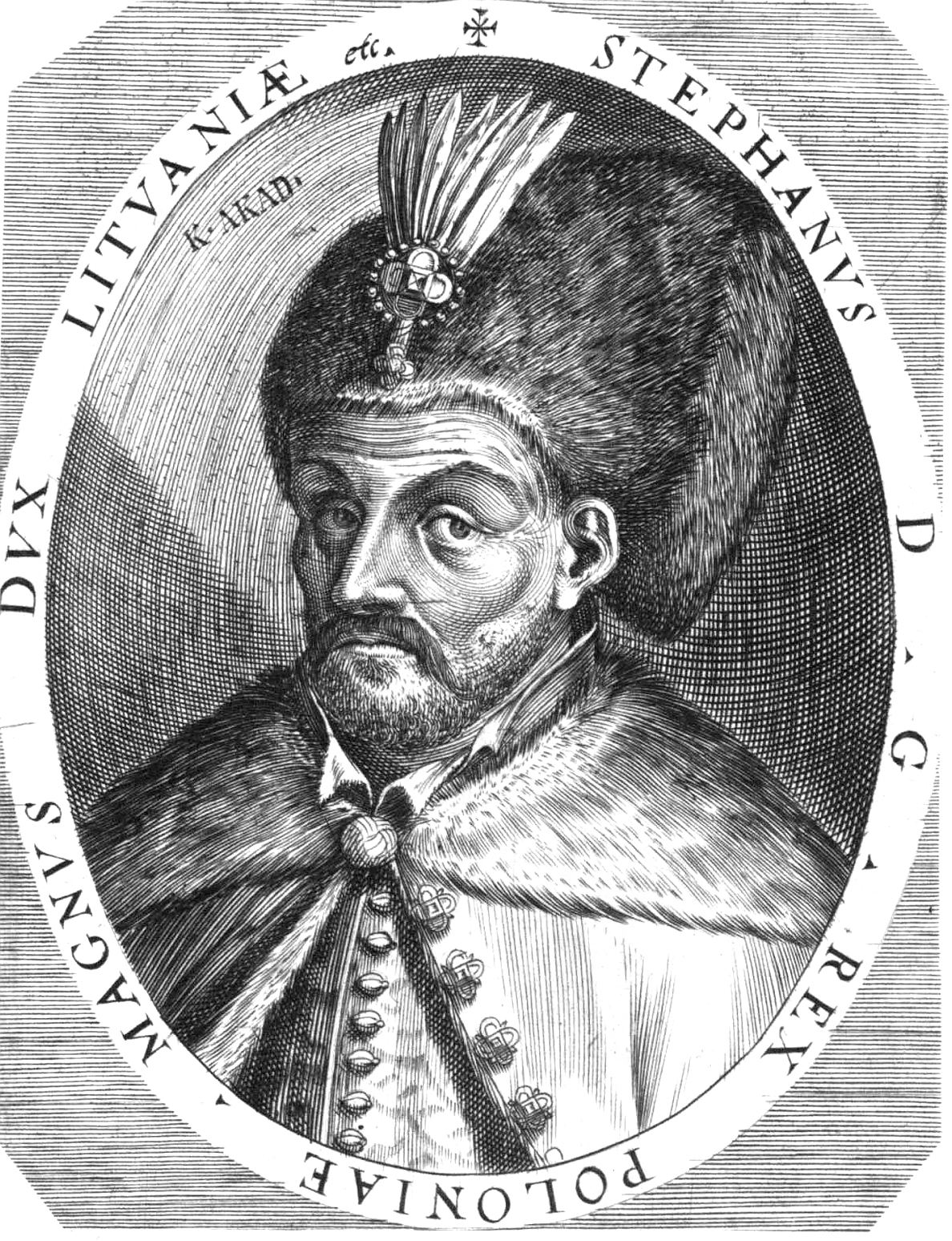
Stephen Báthory

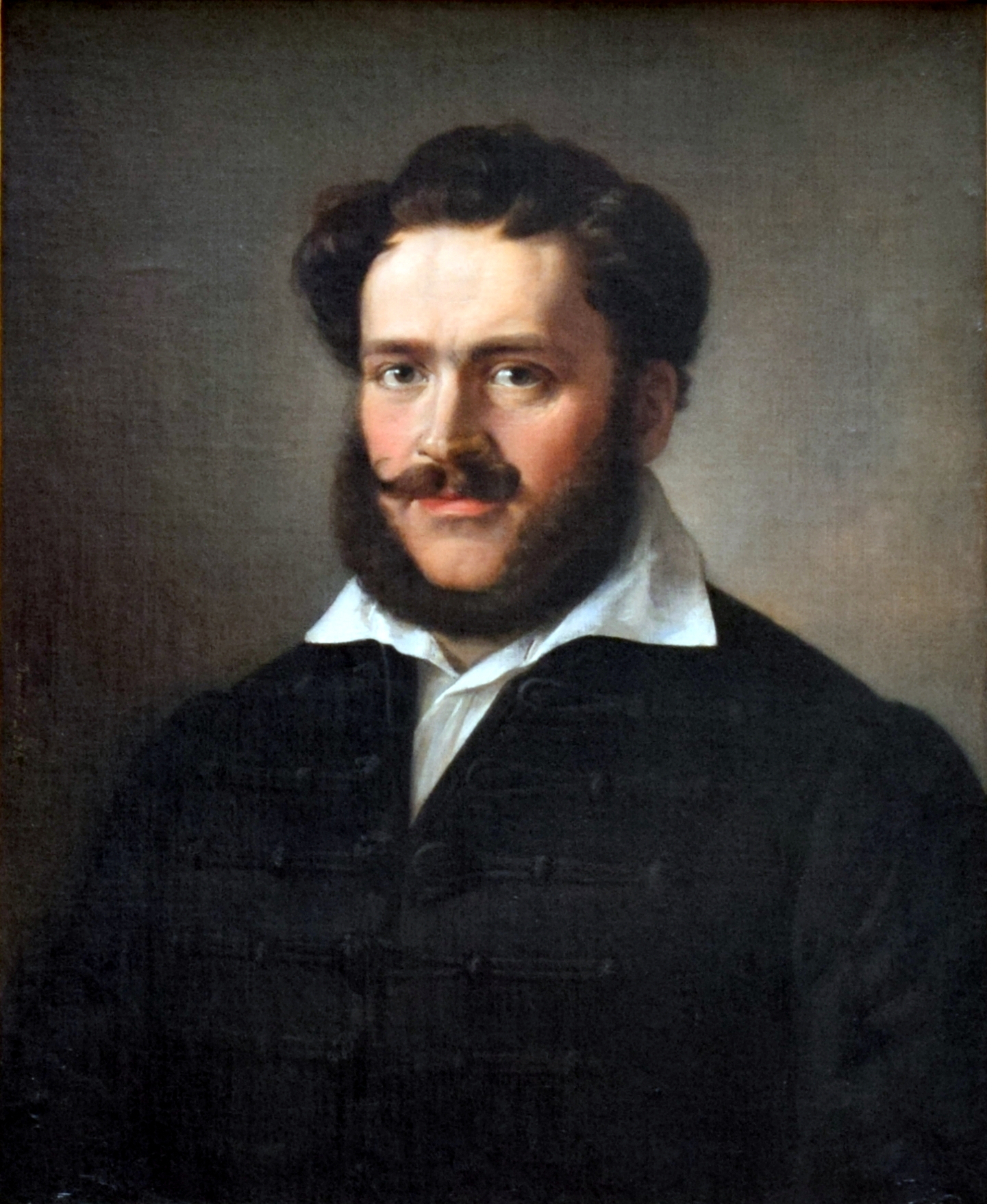
Miklós Wesselényi

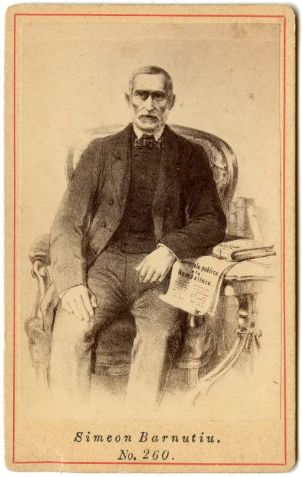
Simion Bărnuțiu

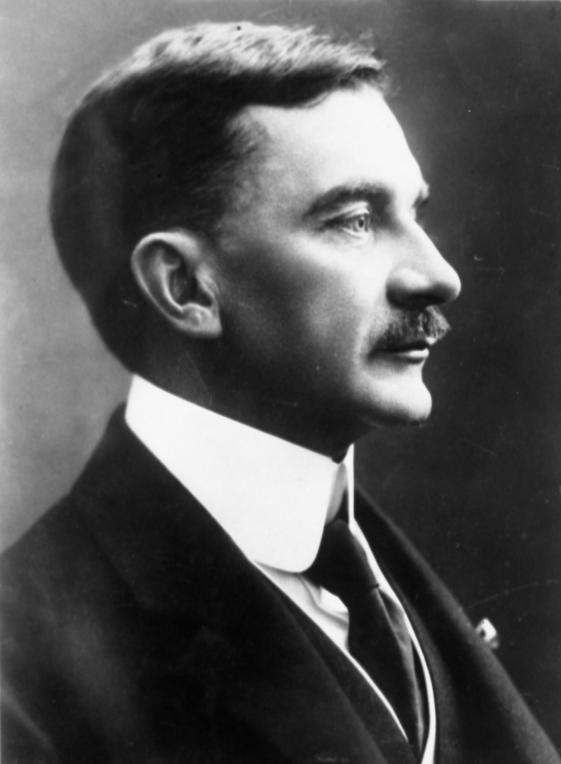
Iuliu Maniu

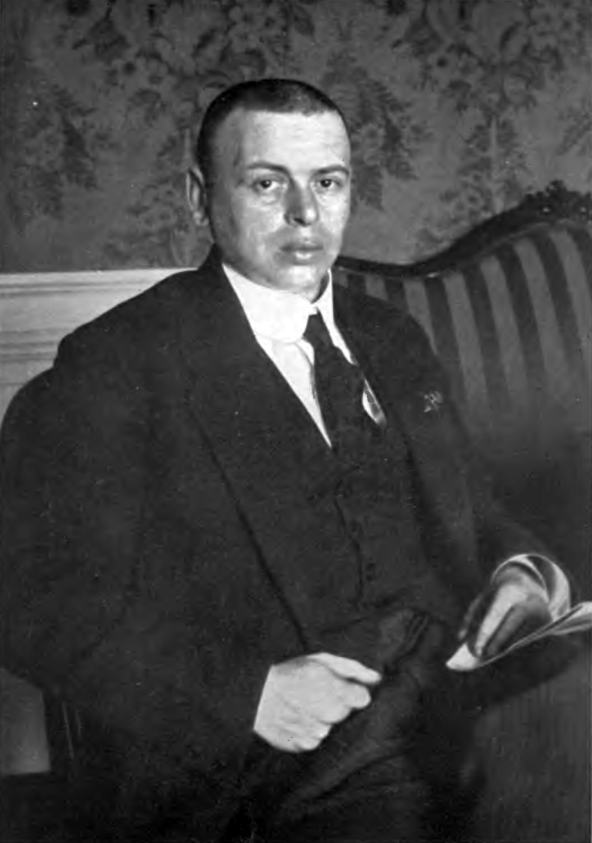
Béla Kun

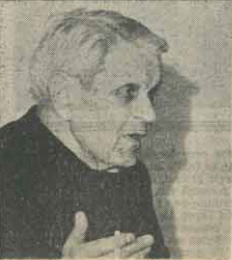
Corneliu Coposu
- Christopher Báthory (1530–1581), Voivode of Transylvania
- Stephen Báthory (1533–1586), Prince of Transylvania and King of Poland
- Miklós Wesselényi (1796–1850), statesman
- Simion Bărnuțiu (1808–1864), politician, historian, philosopher, professor and revolutionary
- Ioan Maniu (1833–1895), journalist and father of Iuliu Maniu
- Alimpiu Barboloviciu (1834–1914), Greek Catholic archpriest, vicar and publicist
- Iuliu Maniu (1873–1953), Prime Minister of Romania
- Béla Kun (1886–1938), revolutionary
- Joe Pasternak (1901–1991), filmmaker
- Miklós Nyiszli (1901–1956), physician and author
- Corneliu Coposu (1914–1995), politician and political prisoner
- Augustin Deac (1928–2004), historian
- Ioan Pușcaș (1932–2015), radiologist
- Florian Pop (b. 1952), mathematician
- Vasile Pușcaș (b. 1952), professor, diplomat and politician
- Codruț Șereș (b. 1969), Economy Minister
- Dacian Cioloș (b. 1969), Prime Minister of Romania
- Eduard Hellvig (b. 1974), MEP, Tourism Minister and Director of the Romanian Intelligence Service
- Cosmin Seleși (b. 1977), actor and TV star
- Ramona Farcău (b. 1979), handball player
- Talida Tolnai (b. 1979), handball player

== Historical county ==
Județul Sălaj
- County (Județ)
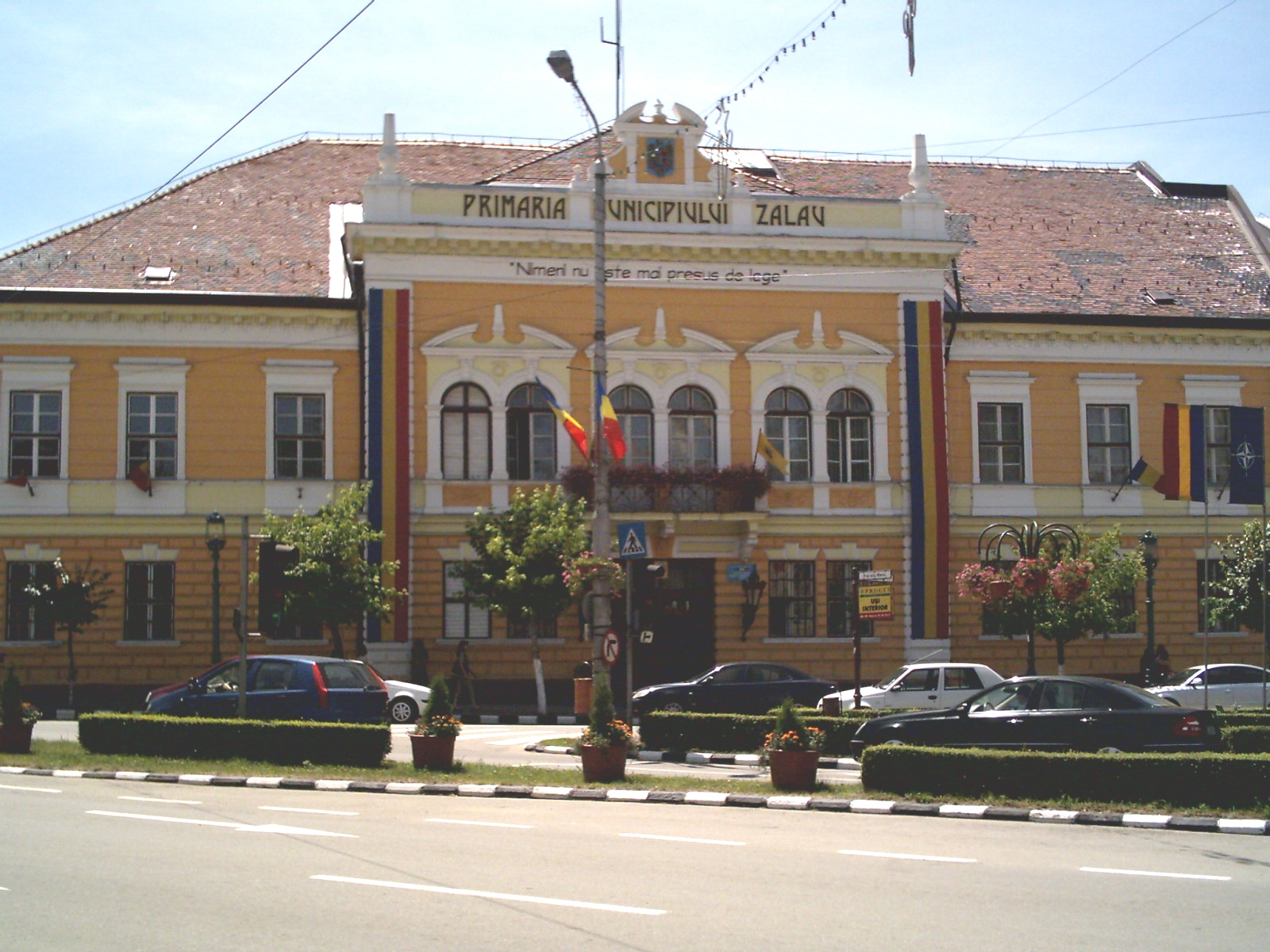
- The Sălaj County Prefecture building of the interwar period, now Zalău city hall.

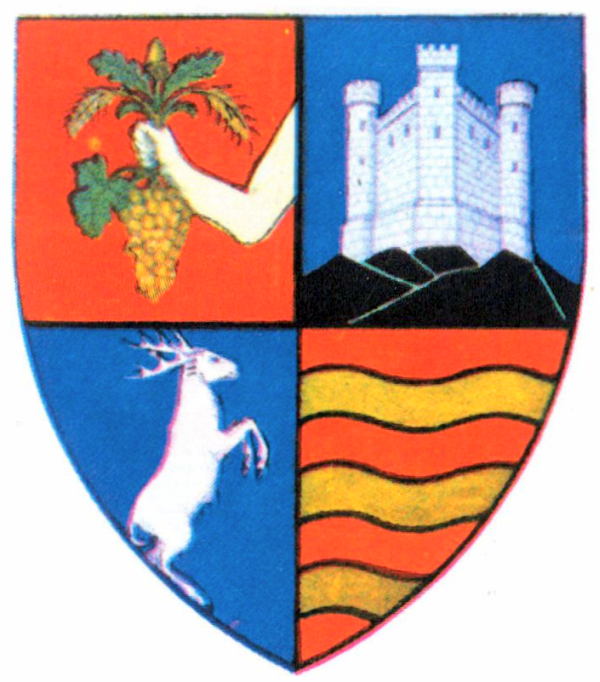
- Coat of arms

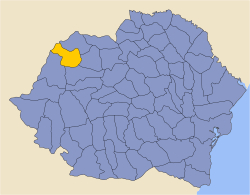
- Country: Romania
- Historic region: Crișana
- Capital city (Reședință de județ): Zalău
- Established: 1925

Area
  - Total: 5,191 km^{2} (2,004 sq mi)

Population (1930)
  - Total: 343,347
  - Density: 66.14/km^{2} (171.3/sq mi)
- Time zone: UTC+2 (EET)
  - Summer (DST): UTC+3 (EEST)

Historically, the county was located in the northwestern part of Greater Romania, on the border with Hungary. The eastern half of its territory was in the historical region of Transylvania, while the western half was located in the Crişana region. After the administrative unification law in 1925, the name of the county remained as it was, but the territory was reorganized. It was bordered on the south with the counties of Bihor and Cluj, to the east by Someș County, to the north by Satu Mare County, and to the west with Hungary. The interwar county's territory included the current Sălaj County, the northern part of the current Bihor County and the southwestern part of the current Satu Mare County.

=== Administration ===
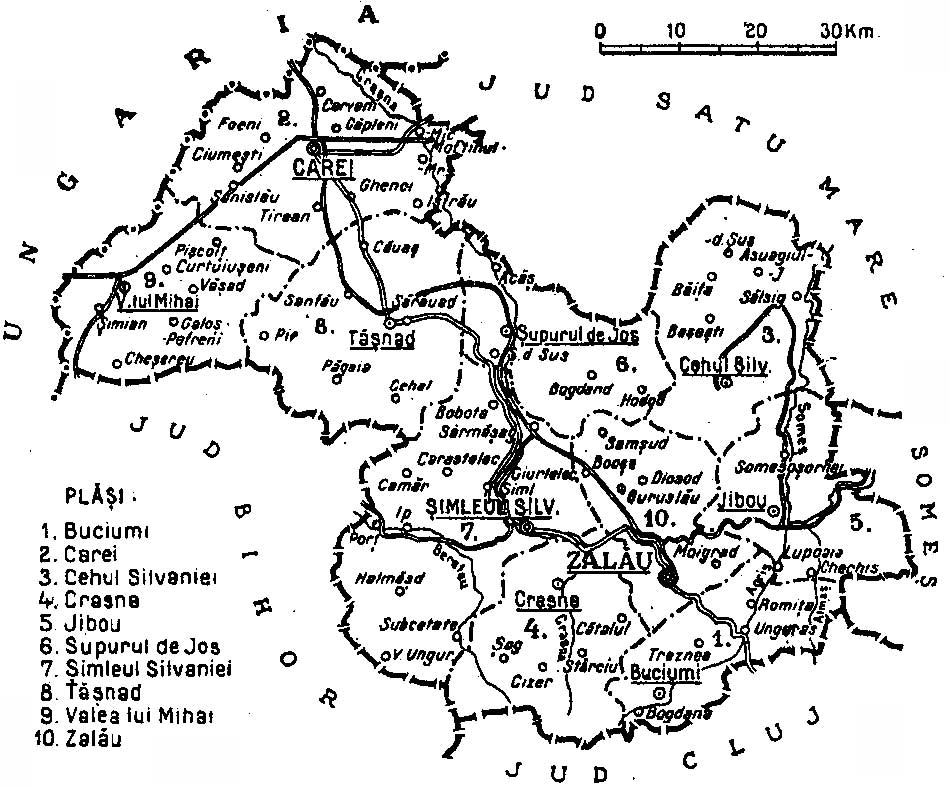
Map of Sălaj County as constituted in 1938.

The county originally consisted of eight districts (plăși):

1. Plasa Carei
2. Plasa Cehu Silvaniei
3. Plasa Crasna
4. Plasa Jibou
5. Plasa Șimleu Silvaniei
6. Plasa Tășnad
7. Plasa Valea lui Mihai
8. Plasa Zalău

A subsequent administrative adjustment added two districts:

1. Plasa Buciumi
2. Plasa Supurul de Jos

The county had three urban communes: Zalău (capital city), Carei, and Șimleu Silvaniei

=== Population ===
According to the census data of 1930, the county's population was 343,347, of which 56.2% were Romanians, 31.4% Hungarians, 4.7% Germans, 3.9% Jews, as well as other minorities. In the religious aspect, the population consisted of 52.6% Greek Catholic, 25.4% Reformed (Calvinist), 12.2% Roman Catholic, 4.0% Jewish, 4.4% Eastern Orthodox, as well as other minorities.

==== Urban population ====
In 1930, the urban population of the county was 31,830, of which 46.1% were Hungarians, 31.6% Romanians, 13.4% Jews, 5.6% Germans, as well as other minorities. As a mother tongue in the urban population, Hungarian was spoken by 62.0% of the population, followed by Romanian (27.5%), Yiddish Yiddish (8.0%), German (1.2%), as well as other minority languages. From the religious point of view, the urban population was made up of 28.6% Reformed, 27.2% Greek Catholic, 24.2% Roman Catholic, 13.8% Jewish, 4.9% Eastern Orthodox, as well as other minorities.
