= Letca =

- Commune
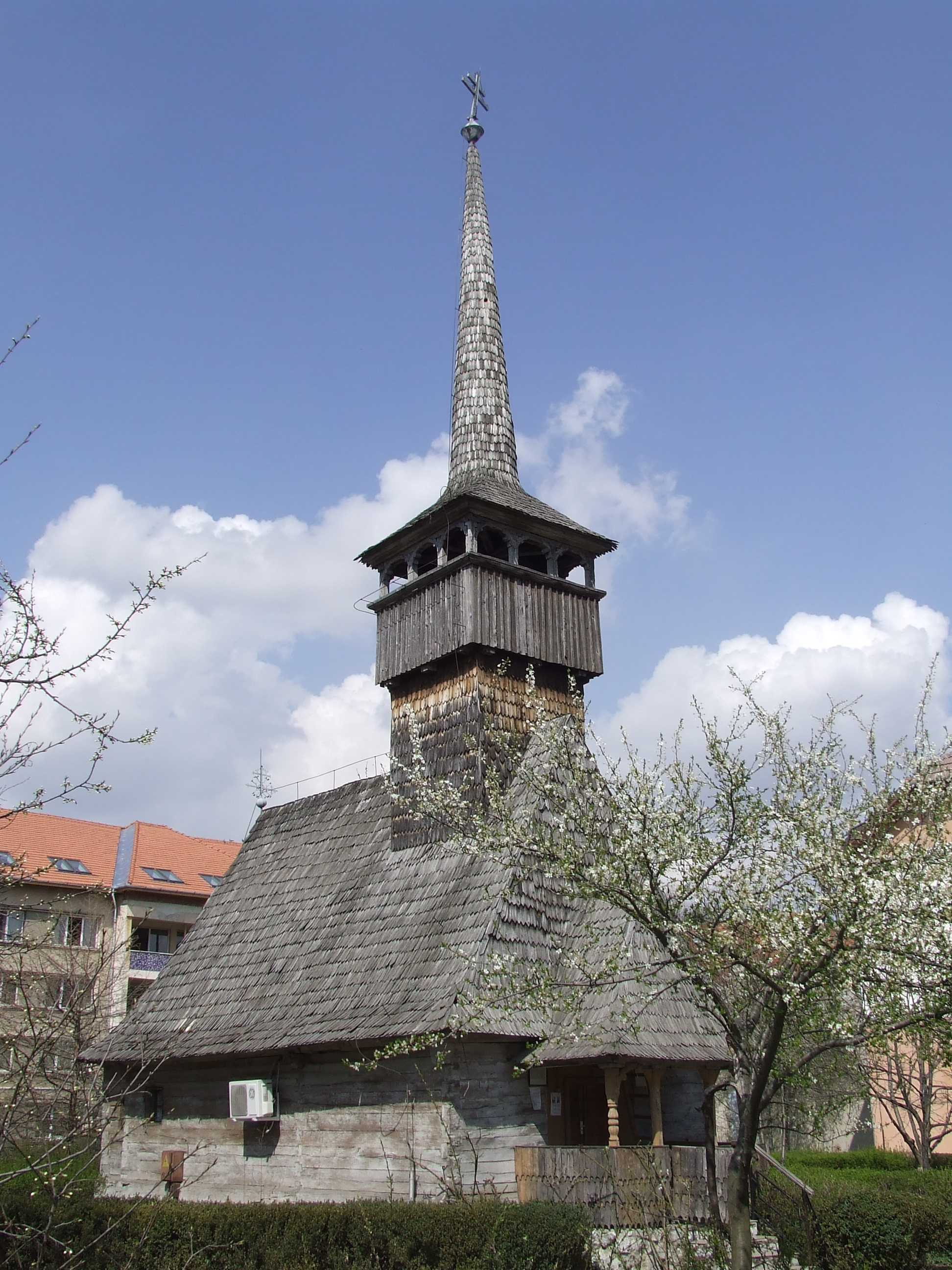
- Wooden Church in Letca

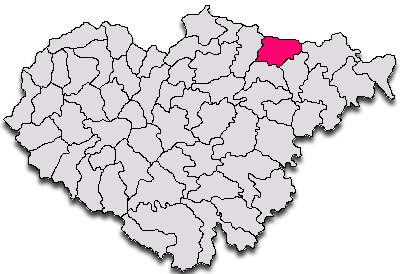
- Location in Sălaj County

- Location in Romania
- Coordinates: 47°20′04″N 23°27′18″E
- Country: Romania
- County: Sălaj

Government
  - Mayor (2020–2024): Dorel Liviu Man (PSD)
- Area: 60.50 km^{2} (23.36 sq mi)
- Elevation: 206 m (676 ft)
- Population (2021-12-01): 1,625
  - Density: 26.86/km^{2} (69.57/sq mi)
- Time zone: UTC+02:00 (EET)
  - Summer (DST): UTC+03:00 (EEST)
- Postal code: 457215
- Area code: +(40) 0260
- Vehicle reg.: SJ
- Website: comunaletca.ro

Letca (Hungarian: Létka) is a commune located in Sălaj County, Transylvania, Romania. It is composed of nine villages: Ciula (Gyulaszeg), Cuciulat (Kocsoládfalva), Cozla (Kecskés), Letca, Lemniu (Lemény), Purcăreț (Pórkerec), Șoimușeni (Kővársolymos), Toplița (Szamoshéviz), and Vălișoara (Dióspatak).

== Villages ==
Purcăreț village had 139 inhabitants at the 2002 census. It is located on the right bank of the Someș River, and borders Maramureș County. It is first attested in a document of 1543, referred to as Porkerecz. Other documents refer to it as Porkoricza (1553), Pwrkerecz, Purkerech (1566), Purkeritz (1733), Porkeresty (1750), Purkeretz (1760-1762), Purkuretz (1830), Purkuretzi (1850), Purkerecz, Purcureți (1854), and finally Purcăreț (1966). The noble family Lazăr of Purcăreț originates from this village. The Wooden Church from Purcăreț is traditionally dated from 1698, although the Culture Ministry cites 1740 and researcher Ioana Cristache-Panait says it is from the first half of the 19th century.

== Sights ==
- Wooden Church “St. Mary” in Letca, built in the 17th century (1665), historic monument
- Wooden Church “St. Archangels” in Letca, built in the 18th century, historic monument
- Wooden Church in Purcăreț, built in the 19th century, historic monument
- Wooden Church in Șoimușeni, built in the 19th century, historic monument
- Wooden Church in Toplița, built in the 19th century (1864), historic monument

== Images gallery ==
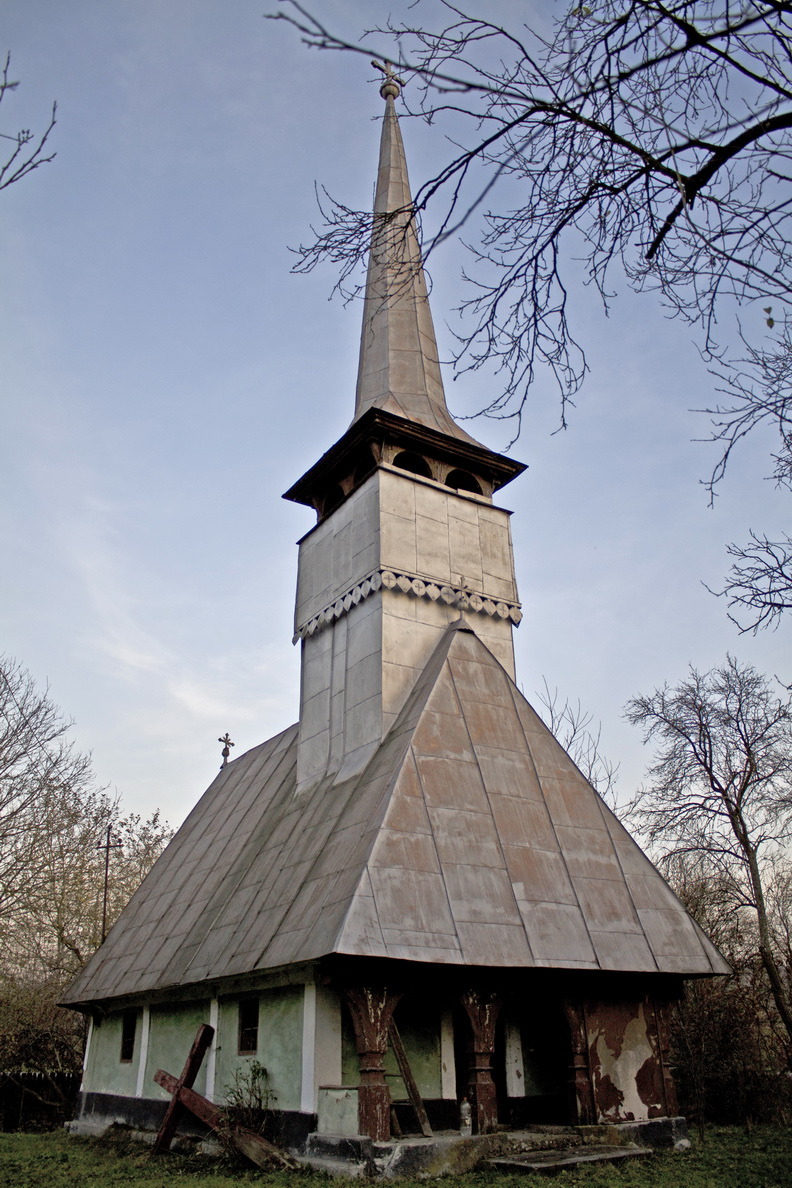
Wooden church in Cuciulat

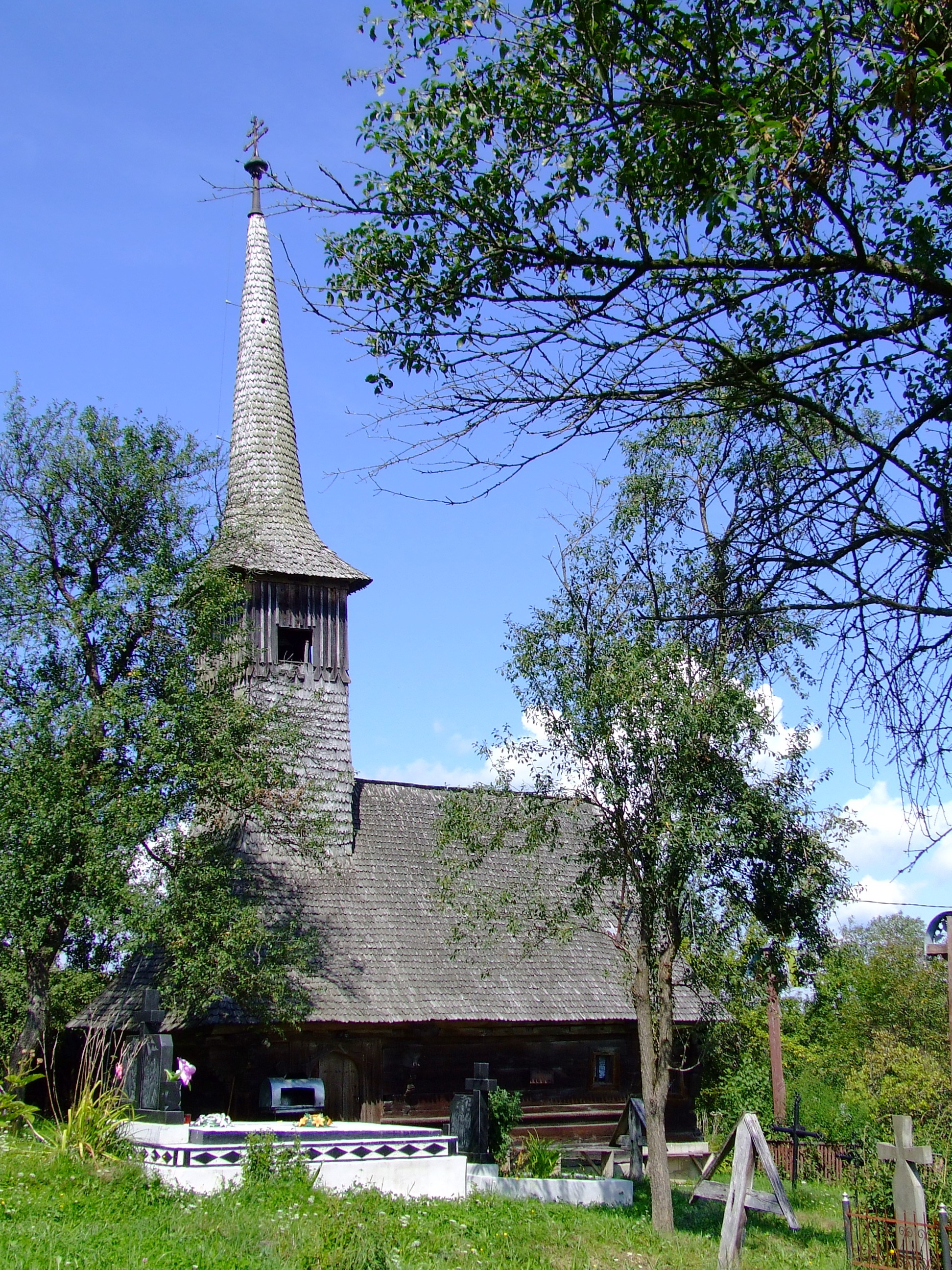
Wooden church in Șoimușeni

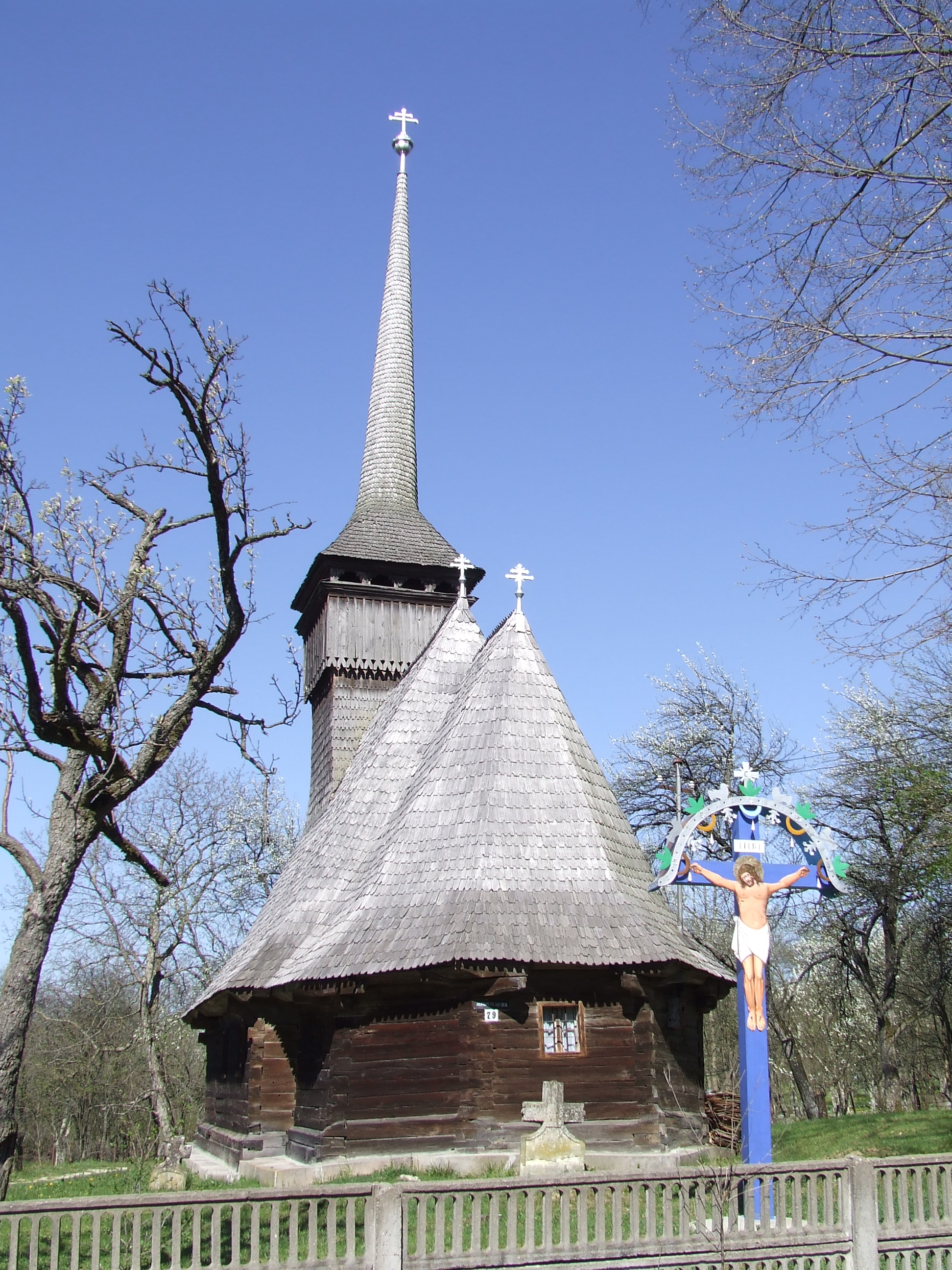
Wooden church in Purcăreț

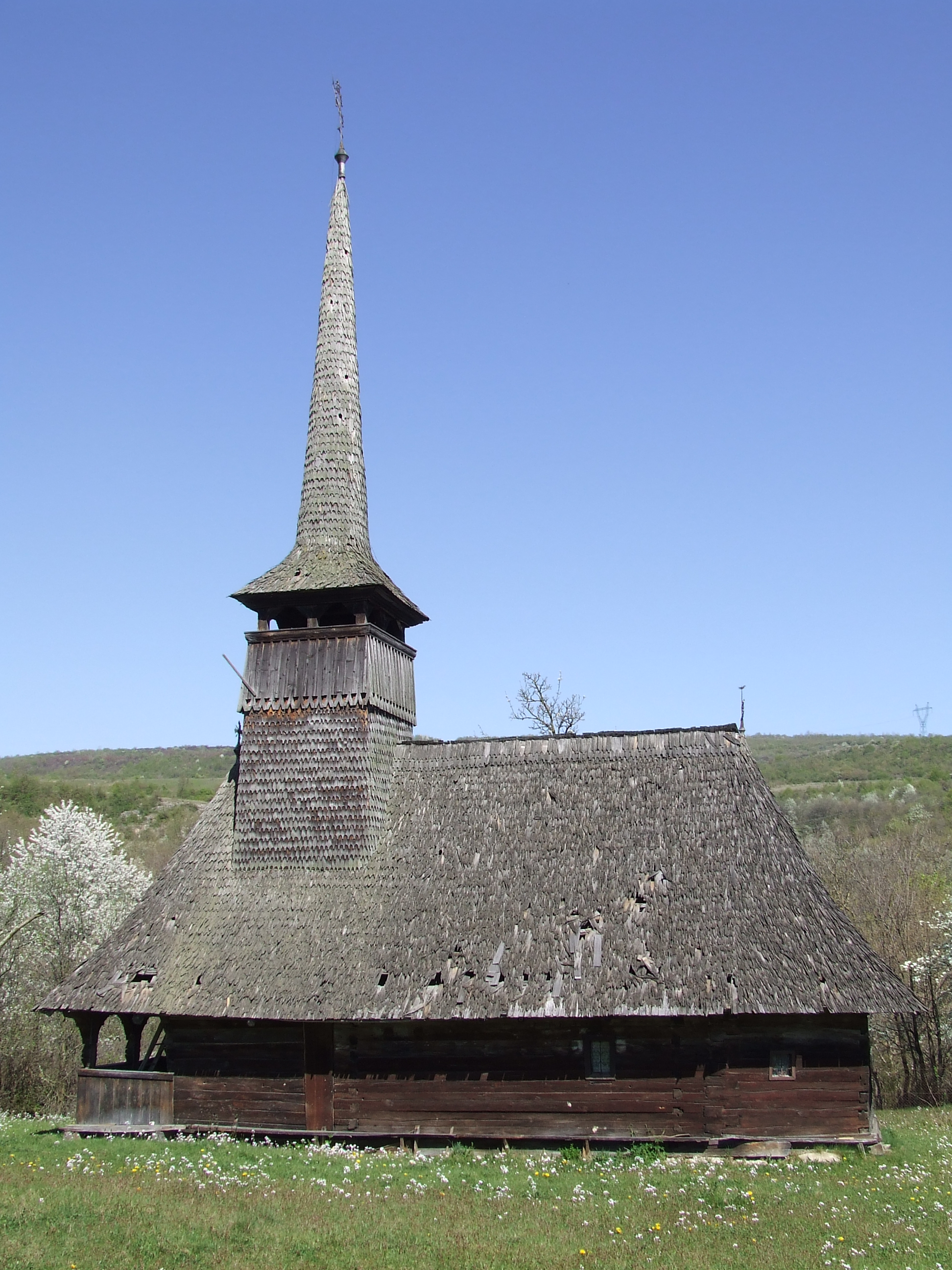
Wooden church in Toplița
