= Ban (river) =

- Location within Romania

Location
- Country: Romania
- Counties: Sălaj
- Villages: Ban, Bănișor, Crasna

Physical characteristics
- Mouth: Crasna
  - coordinates: 47.1537°N 22.8728°E
- Length: 16 km (9.9 mi)
- Basin size: 60 km^{2} (23 sq mi)

Basin features
- Progression: Crasna→ Tisza→ Danube→ Black Sea

The Ban is a left tributary of the river Crasna in Romania. It discharges into the Crasna in the town Crasna. Its length is 16 km (9.9 mi) and its basin size is 60 km^{2} (23 sq mi).
