= Valea Neagră (Crasna) =

- Location within Hungary Location within Romania

Location
- Countries: Romania and Hungary
- Counties: Satu Mare; Szabolcs-Szatmár-Bereg
- Villages: Foieni; Urziceni

Physical characteristics
- Source
  - location: Romania
- Mouth: Crasna
  - location: Hungary
  - coordinates: 47.7783°N 22.4026°E

Basin features
- Progression: Crasna→ Tisza→ Danube→ Black Sea
- Tributaries
  - left: Scărișoara

The Valea Neagră is a left tributary of the Crasna river. It originates in Romania near the village of Foieni, crosses into Hungary north of Urziceni and finally joins the Crasna near Mérk. In Romania, its length is 14 km (8.7 mi) and its basin size is 125 km^{2} (48 sq mi).
