= Meseș Mountains =

Mountain range in Romania

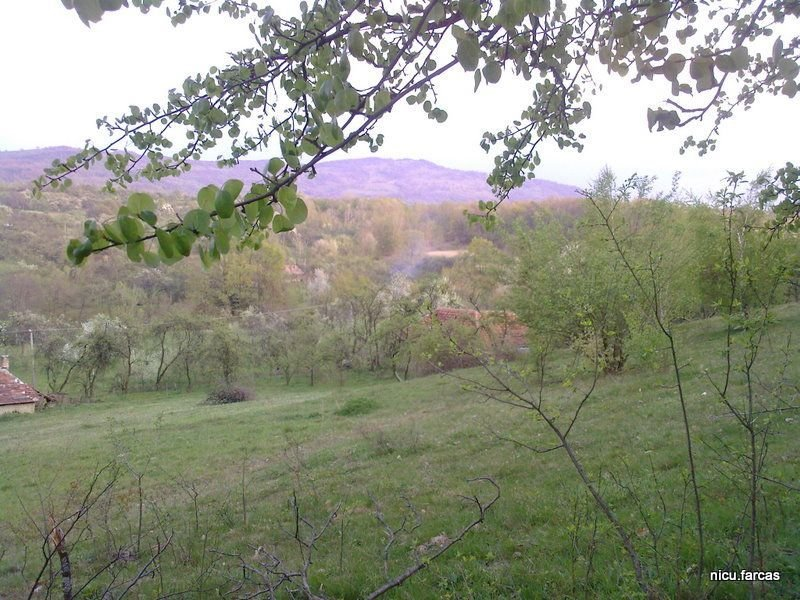
- Măgura Priei

Highest point
- Peak: Măgura Priei Peak
- Elevation: 996 m (3,268 ft)
- Coordinates: 47°07′06″N 23°02′04″E

Naming
- Native name: Munții Meseșului (Romanian)

Geography
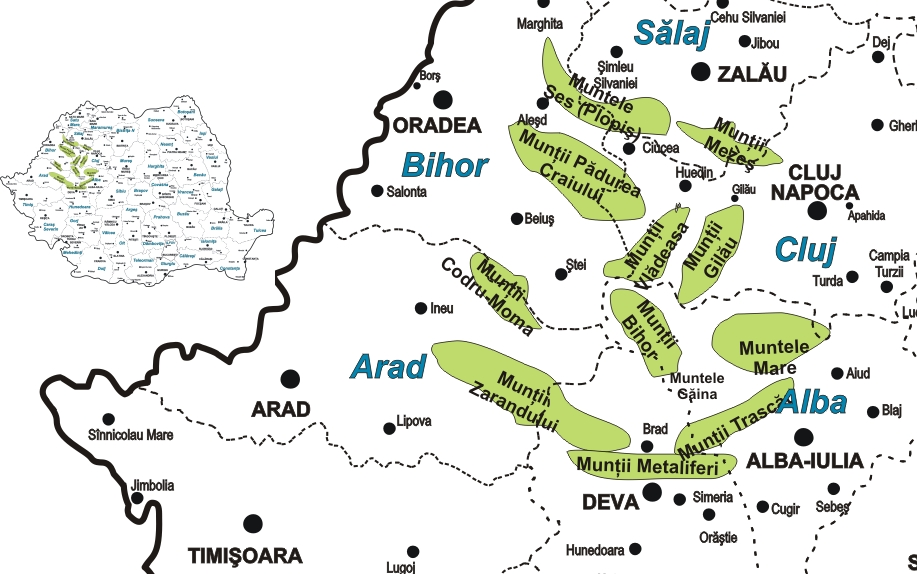
- Meseș Mountains
- Country: Romania
- Region: Transylvania
- Counties: Sălaj and Cluj

The Meseș Mountains (Romanian: Munții Meseșului, Hungarian: Meszes-hegység) are a mountain range in Transylvania, Romania, which belongs to the Apuseni Mountains. The highest peak is Măgura Priei Peak, at 996 m (3,268 ft).

The mountains are located in Sălaj and Cluj counties, south of Zalău and northwest of Cluj-Napoca. The main rivers flowing through the area are the Crasna (with its tributary, the Pria), Almaș, and Agrij.

== Gallery ==
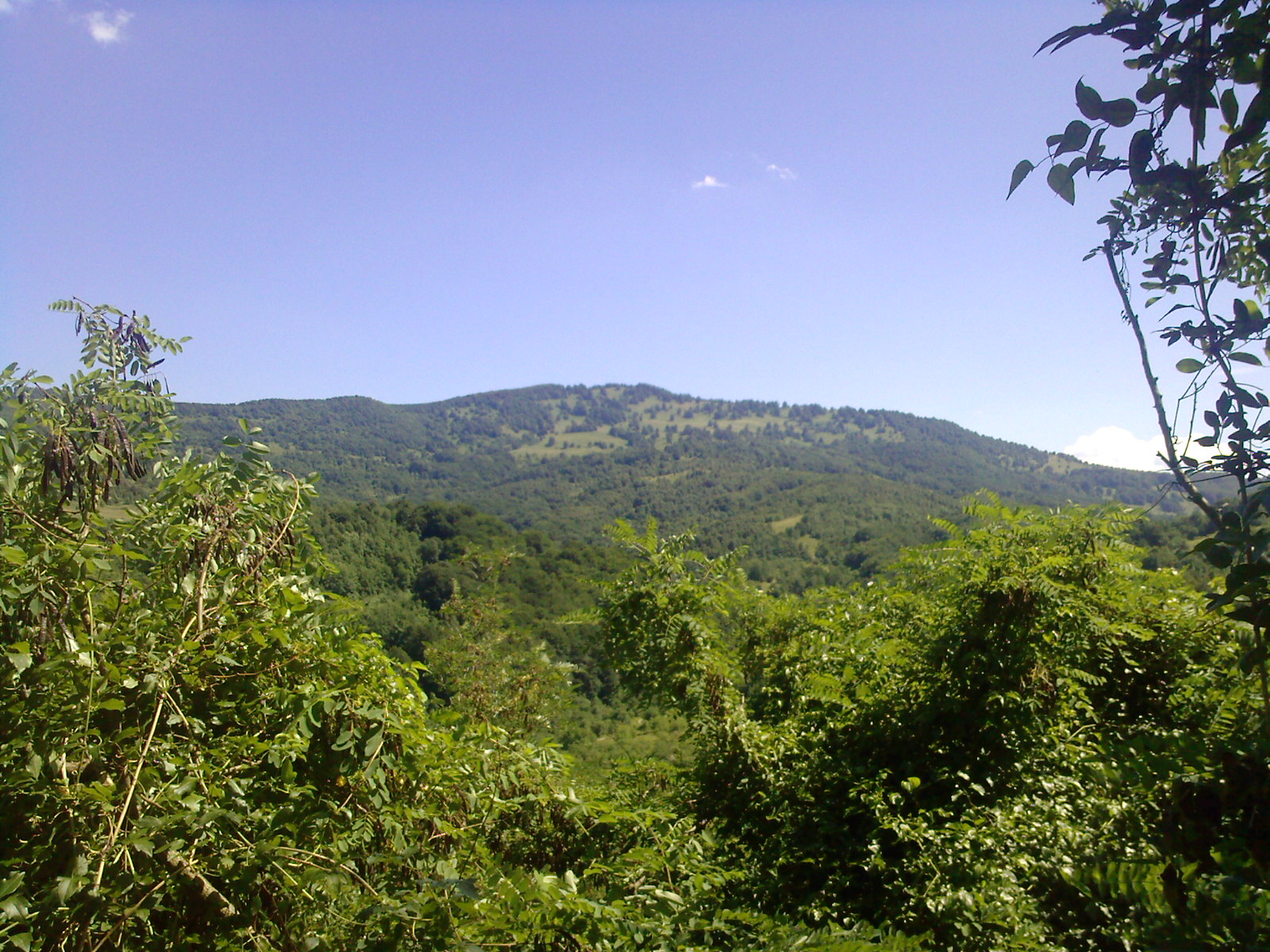
Măgura Priei Peak

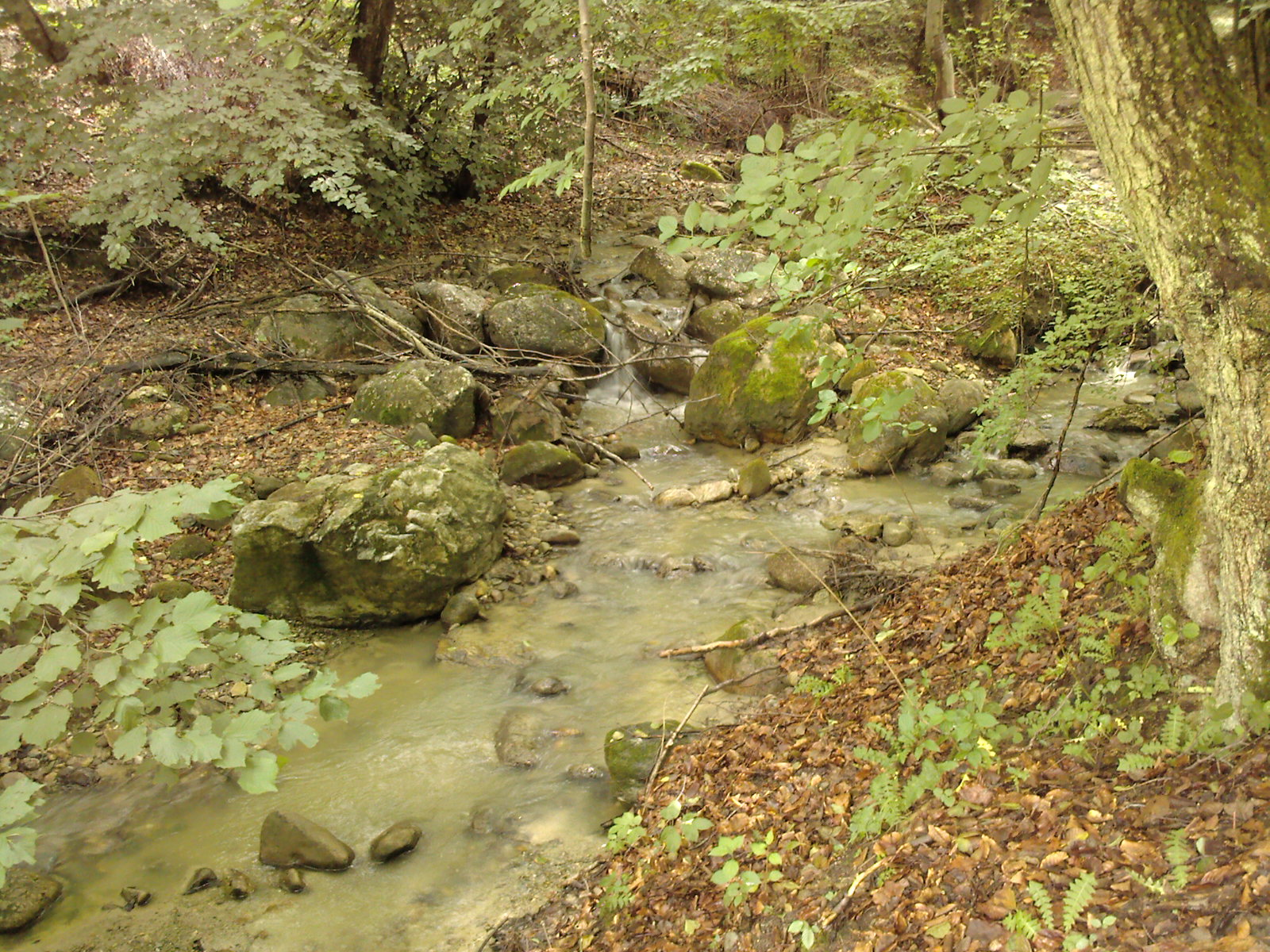

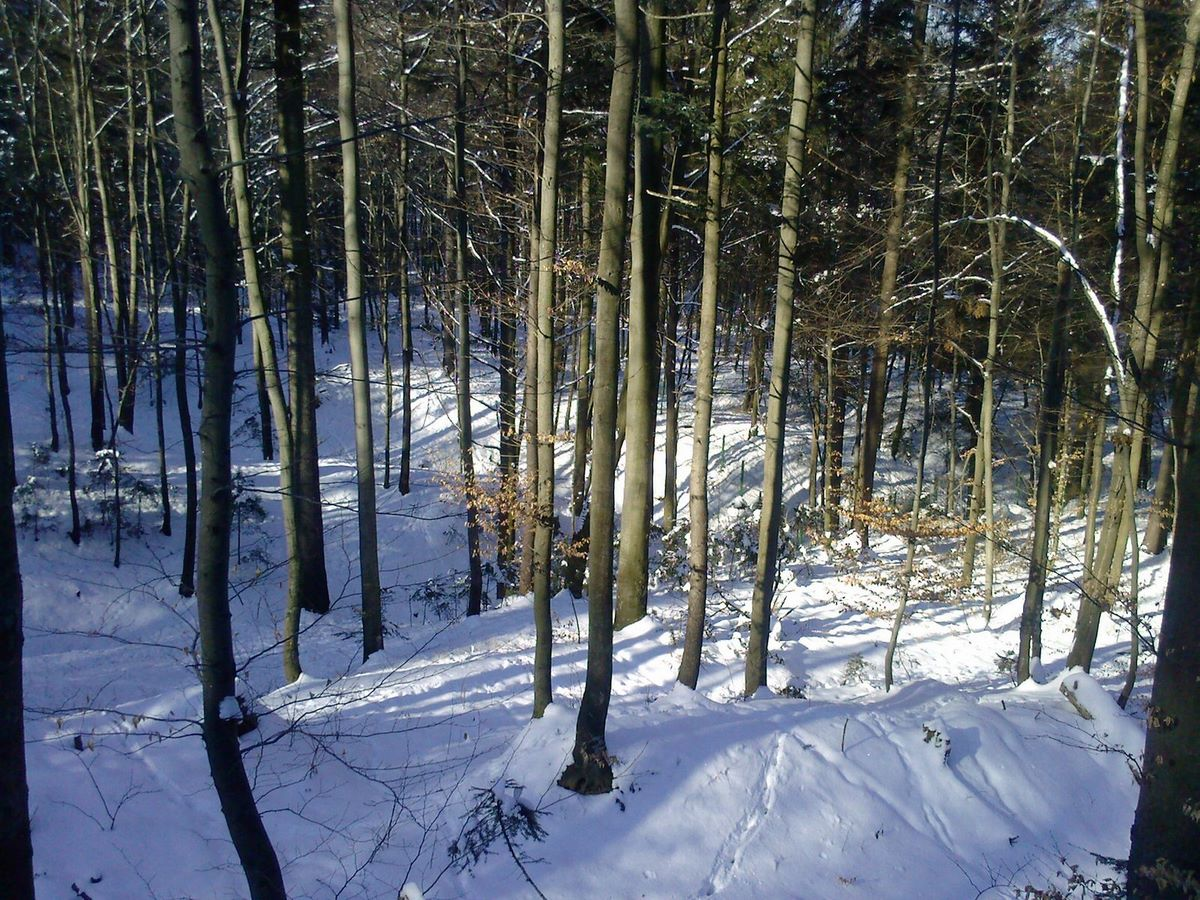

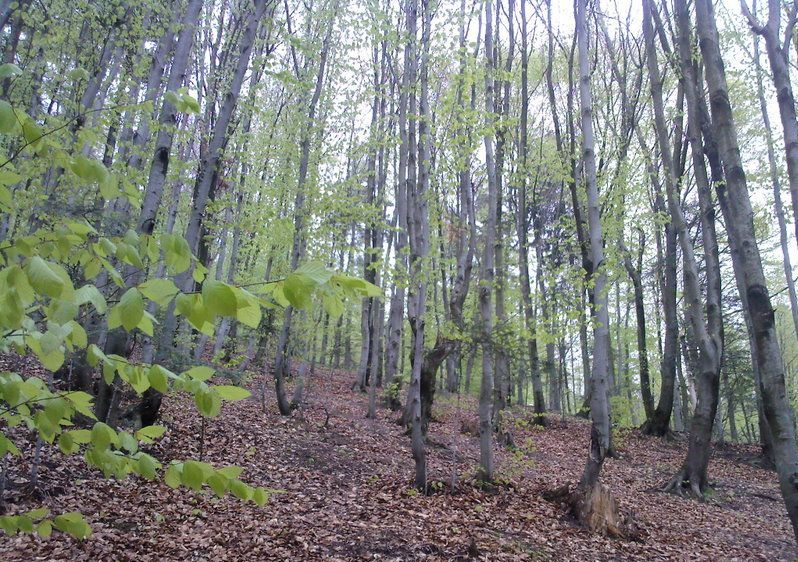

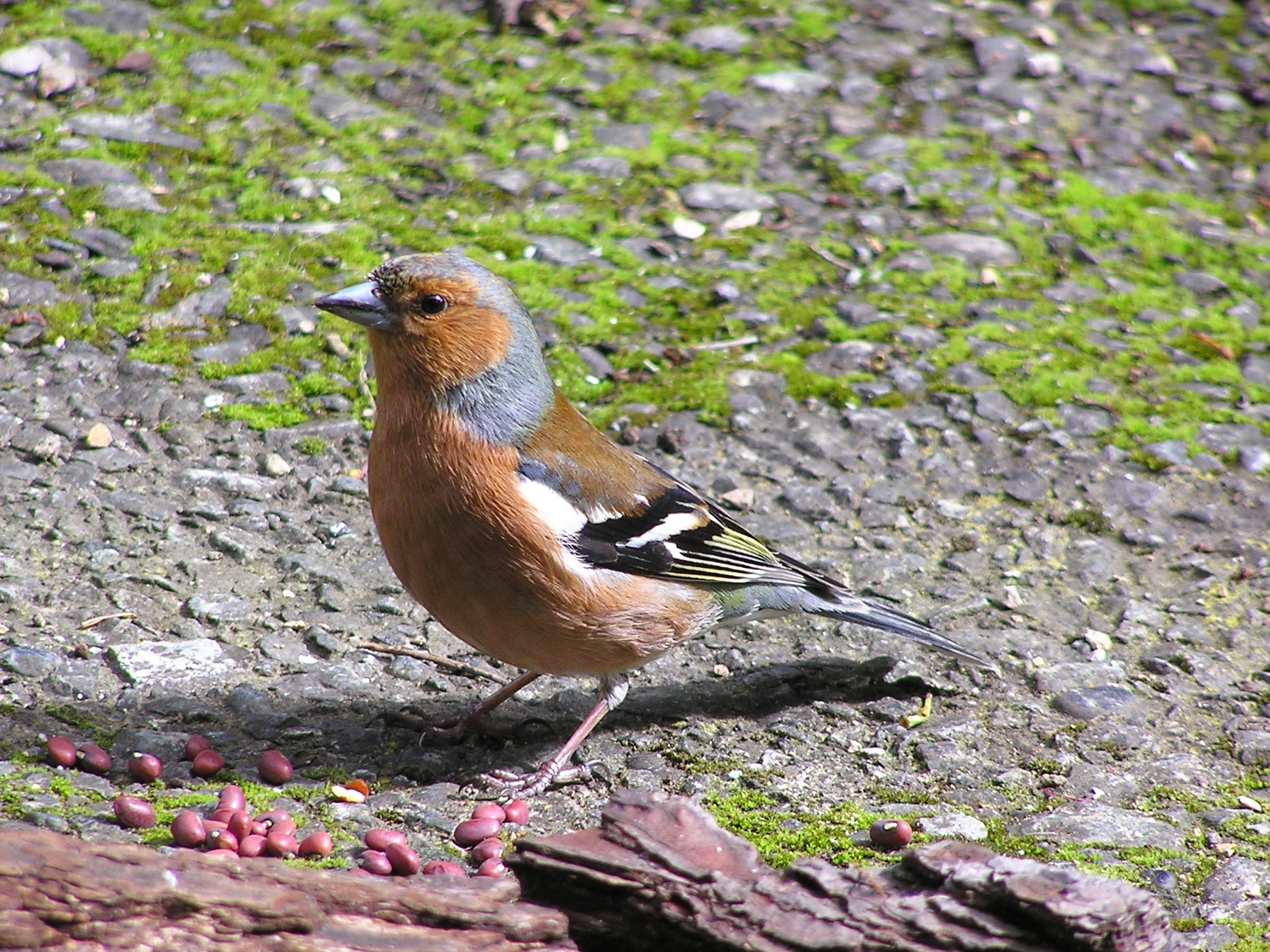

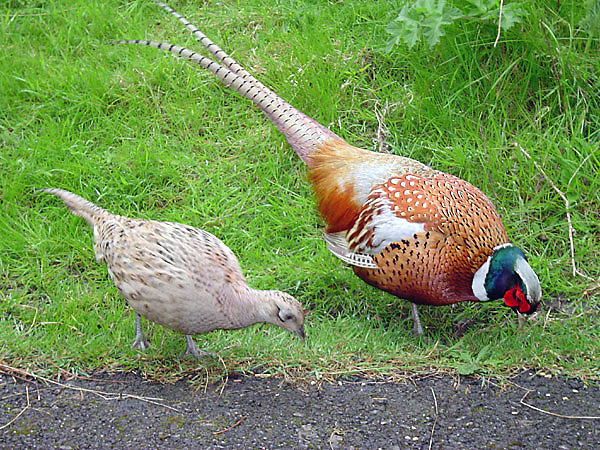

== Bibliography ==
- Sălaj, Monografie, Victor Cormoș, Valentin Borda, Editura Sport Turism, București 1980.
- Zona Etnografică Meseș, Ioan Augustin Goia, Editura Sport-Turism, București 1982.
- Geografia României I. Geografia fizică, M. Ielenicz, Editura Universitară 2005
