= Cizer =

- Commune
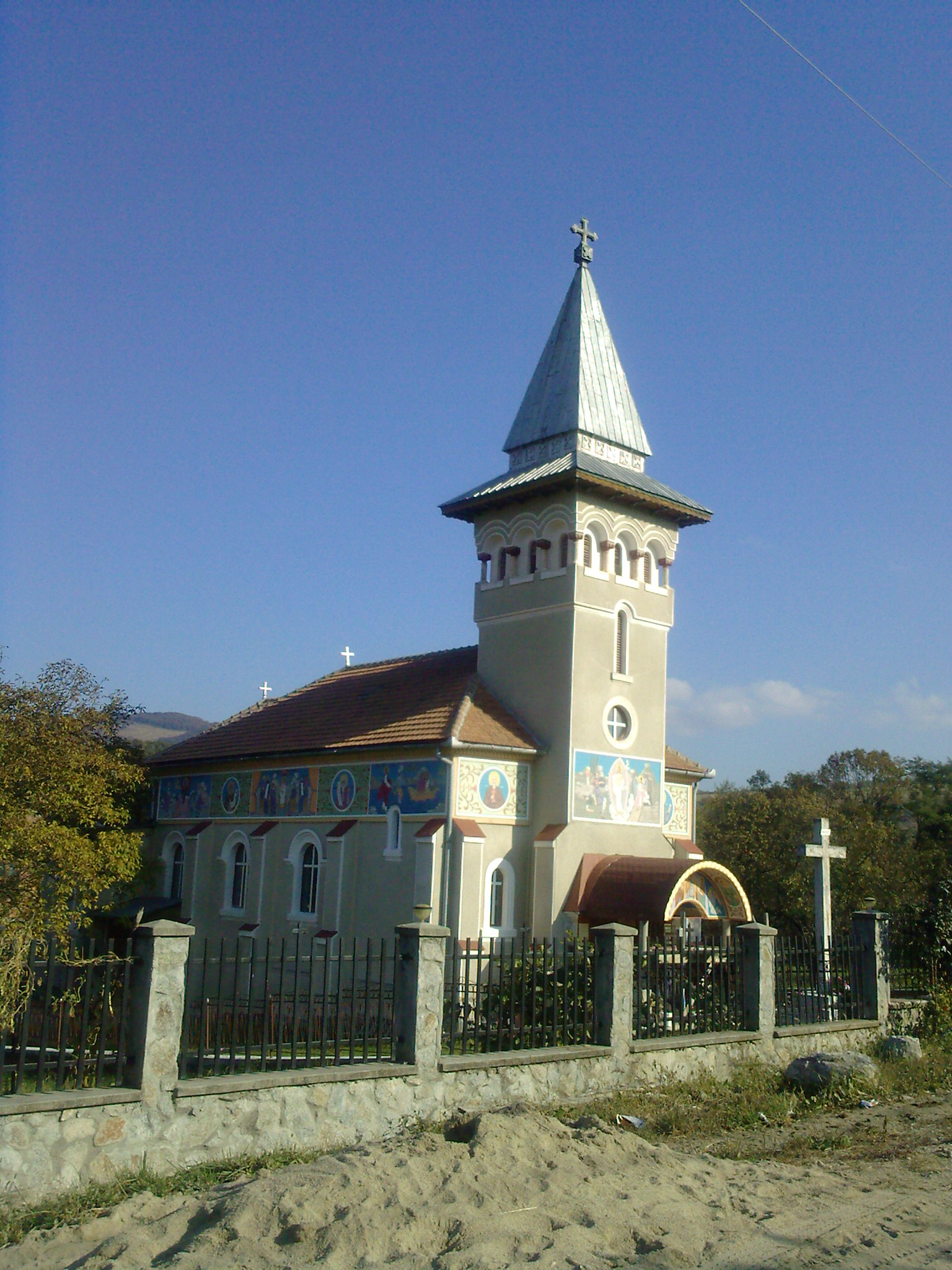
- Saints Peter and Paul Church in Pria

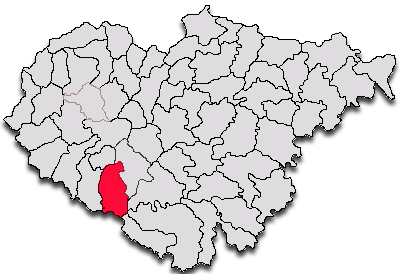
- Location in Sălaj County

- Location in Romania
- Coordinates: 47°4′2″N 22°51′43″E
- Country: Romania
- County: Sălaj

Government
  - Mayor (2020–2024): Nicolae Pavel (PNL)
- Area: 71.23 km^{2} (27.50 sq mi)
- Highest elevation: 996 m (3,268 ft)
- Population (2021-12-01): 2,116
  - Density: 29.71/km^{2} (76.94/sq mi)
- Time zone: UTC+02:00 (EET)
  - Summer (DST): UTC+03:00 (EEST)
- Postal code: 457075
- Area code: +(40) 0260
- Vehicle reg.: SJ
- Website: www.primariacizer.ro

Cizer (Hungarian: Csizér) is a commune located in Sălaj County, Crișana, Romania. It is composed of three villages: Cizer, Plesca (Palicka), and Pria (Perje).

== Geography ==
The commune is located in the southwestern part of the county, 33 km (21 mi) away from the county seat, Zalău, on the border with Cluj County.

Cizer is nestled within the Meseș Mountains (a mountain range within the Apuseni Mountains). The highest peak in the Meseș Mountains, Măgura Priei Peak, with an elevation of 996 m (3,268 ft), is located on the territory of the commune.

The commune lies on the banks of the river Crasna; its affluent, the Pria, discharges into the Crasna in the village of Plesca.

== Sights ==
- Museum in Cizer (rustic old house), built in the 18th century, historic monument.
- Orthodox Church in Pria, built in the 20th century (1930–1936).
