= Colițca =

- Location within Romania

Location
- Country: Romania
- Counties: Sălaj County
- Villages: Meseșenii de Sus, Meseșenii de Jos

Physical characteristics
- Mouth: Crasna
  - location: into Lake Vârșolț
  - coordinates: 47.1772°N 22.9284°E
- Length: 11 km (6.8 mi)
- Basin size: 43 km^{2} (17 sq mi)

Basin features
- Progression: Crasna→ Tisza→ Danube→ Black Sea

The Colițca is a right tributary of the river Crasna in Romania. It discharges into the Vârșolț Reservoir, which is drained by the Crasna. Its length is 11 km (6.8 mi) and its basin size is 43 km^{2} (17 sq mi).
