= Silaghi =

Silaghi is a Romanian surname, derived from the Hungarian Szilágyi. Notable people with the surname include:

- Florica Silaghi (born 1957), Romanian rower
- Ovidiu Ioan Silaghi (born 1962), Romanian politician
- Valentin Silaghi (born 1957), Romanian boxer
