= László Szilágyi =

László Szilágyi may refer to the following Hungarian people:

- Ladislaus Szilágyi, 15th century nobleman and general
- László Szilágyi (judoka)
- László Szilágyi (politician)
- László Szilágyi (writer)
