= Horoatu Crasnei =

- Commune
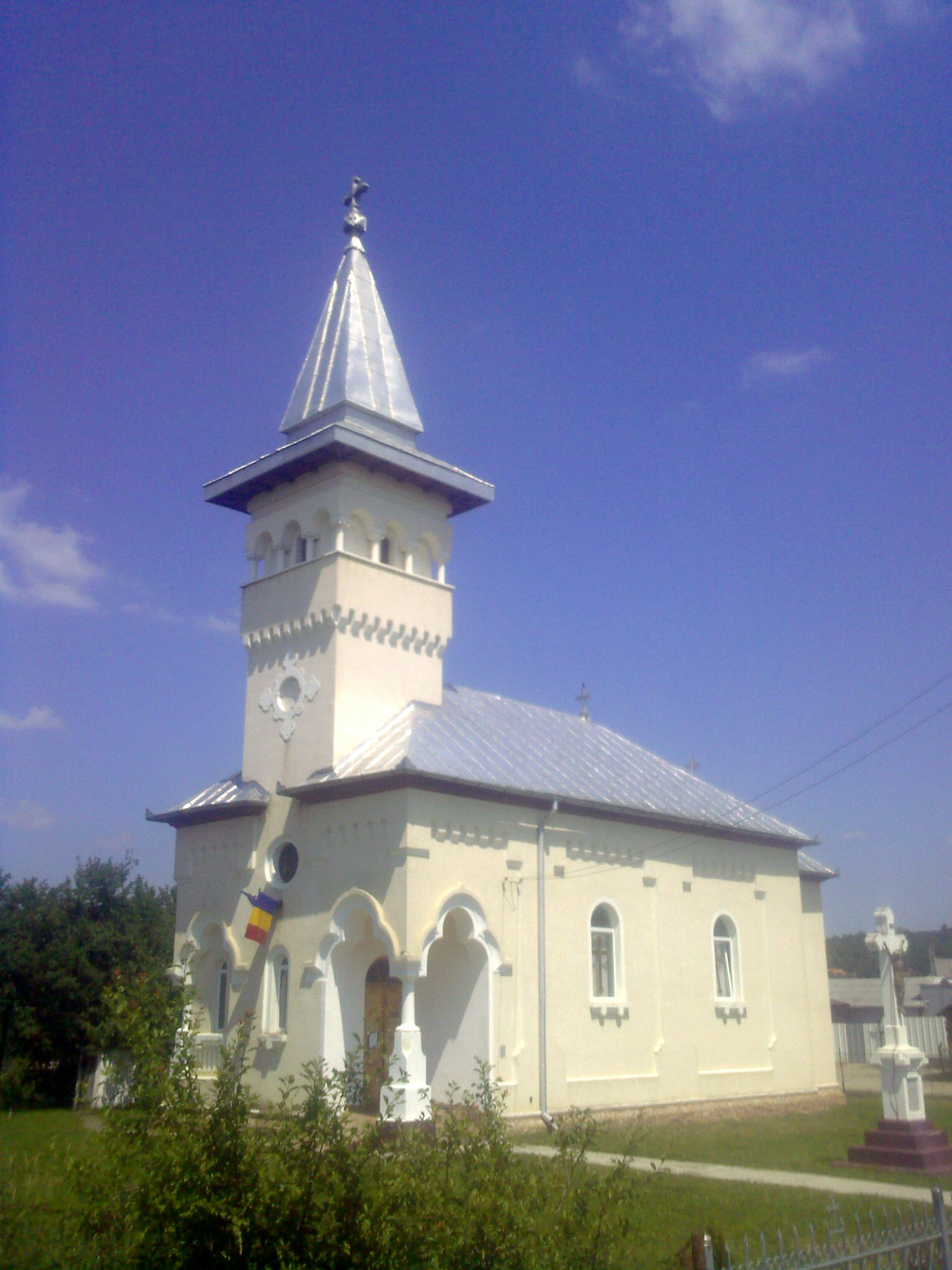
- Orthodox church in Horoatu Crasnei

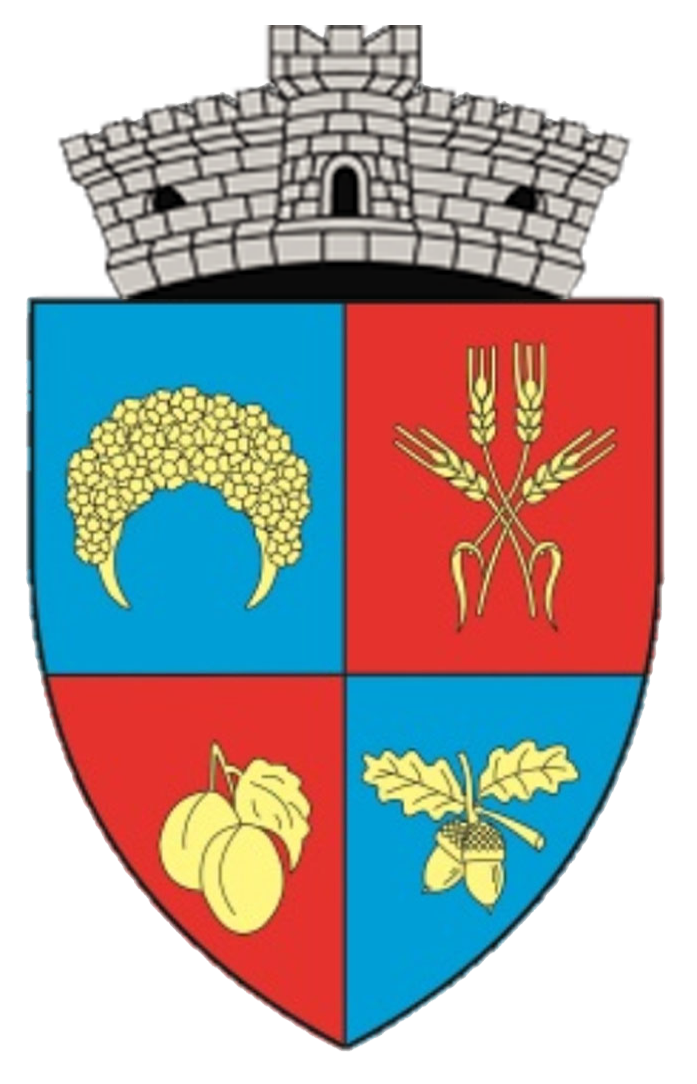
- Coat of arms

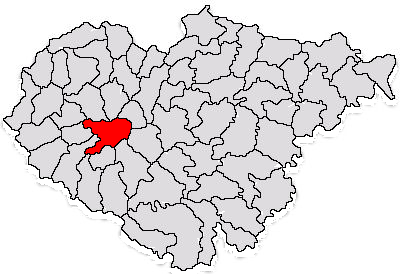
- Location in Sălaj County

- Location in Romania
- Coordinates: 47°07′32″N 22°53′55″E
- Country: Romania
- County: Sălaj

Government
  - Mayor (2020–2024): Marian Mirișan (PNL)
- Area: 84.39 km^{2} (32.58 sq mi)
- Elevation: 269 m (883 ft)
- Population (2021-12-01): 2,522
  - Density: 29.89/km^{2} (77.40/sq mi)
- Time zone: UTC+02:00 (EET)
  - Summer (DST): UTC+03:00 (EEST)
- Postal code: 457185
- Area code: +40 x60
- Vehicle reg.: SJ
- Website: www.comunahoroatucrasnei.ro

Horoatu Crasnei (Hungarian: Krasznahorvát) is a commune located in Sălaj County, Crișana, Romania. The commune is composed of four villages: Horoatu Crasnei, Hurez (Bagolyfalu), Stârciu (Bogdánháza), and Șeredeiu (Sereden).

The commune is located in the west-central part of Sălaj County, 25 km (16 mi) southwest of the county seat, Zalău. It lies on the banks of the river Crasna and its right tributary, the river Ponița.

== History ==
The first historical accounts of the Stârciu village was in 1341. Until 1919, the commune was part of the Kingdom of Hungary's Szilágy County. After the collapse of Austria-Hungary at the end of World War I and the declaration of the Union of Transylvania with Romania, the Romanian Army took control of the locality in April 1919, during the Hungarian–Romanian War. The town officially became part of the territory ceded to the Kingdom of Romania in June 1920 under the terms of the Treaty of Trianon. During the interwar period, it became part of plasa Crasna, in Sălaj County. In August 1940, under the auspices of Nazi Germany, which imposed the Second Vienna Award, Hungary retook the territory of Northern Transylvania (which included Horoatu Crasnei) from Romania. Towards the end of World War II, however, the commune was taken back from Hungarian and German troops by Romanian and Soviet forces in October 1944. In 1950, it fell within the Cluj Region; in 1968, a new administrative law was adopted, and Horoatu Crasnei became once again part of Zalău County.

== Demographics ==
In 1910, Stârciu village had 1,505 inhabitants: 1,453 Romanians and 25 Hungarians. At the 2021 census, the commune had a population of 2,522, of which 75,85% were Romanians, 11.54% Hungarians, and 7.41% Roma.

== Sights ==
- Reformed Church in Horoatu Crasnei, built in the 15th century, historic monument
- Orthodox Church in Horoatu Crasnei, built in the 18th century
