= Mortăuța =

- Location within Romania

Location
- Country: Romania
- Counties: Sălaj County
- Villages: Huseni, Ratin

Physical characteristics
- Mouth: Crasna
  - location: Crasna
  - coordinates: 47.1804°N 22.8876°E
- Length: 12 km (7.5 mi)
- Basin size: 48 km^{2} (19 sq mi)

Basin features
- Progression: Crasna→ Tisza→ Danube→ Black Sea
- Tributaries
  - right: Carhani, Ratova

The Mortăuța is a left tributary of the river Crasna in Romania. It discharges into the Crasna near the town Crasna. Its length is 12 km (7.5 mi) and its basin size is 48 km^{2} (19 sq mi).
