= Kraszna County =

County of the Kingdom of Hungary

Coordinates: 47°13′N 22°48′E

Kraszna County Kraszna vármegye (Hungarian)
- County of the Kingdom of Hungary, Eastern Hungarian Kingdom and Transylvanian Partium
- c. 1100 (first mentioned in 1164)–1876
- Map of Transylvania 1606–1660. Kraszna County can be seen in the upper-middle.
- Capital: Krasznavár; Valkóvár; Szilágysomlyó
- History
  - Established: c. 1100 (first mentioned in 1164)
  - Eastern Hungarian Kingdom established: 11 November 1526
  - Treaty of Speyer – Principality of Transylvania: 16 August 1570
  - Treaty of Karlowitz – Transylvania ceded to Habsburg Monarchy: 26 January 1699
  - Status of the Partium resolved; Kraszna formally attached to Transylvania: 31 December 1732
  - Counties of Transylvania abolished: 12 May 1851
  - Counties restored: 1860
  - Ausgleich – Transylvania abolished; counties pass to Hungary: 29 May 1867
  - Counties of Hungary reorganised: 1876
Succeeded by
Szilágy County
- Today part of: Romania

Kraszna county (Hungarian: Kraszna vármegye) is a former administrative county (comitatus) of the Kingdom of Hungary along the river Kraszna; its territory is now in north-western Romania. Its capital cities were Krasznavár (today in German: Krassmarkt, Romanian: Crasna), Valkóvár (Romanian: Cetatea Valcău) and Szilágysomlyó (German: Schomlenmarkt, Romanian: Șimleu Silvaniei).

The county was established in the 12th century within the Árpád Kingdom of Hungary.

In the 16th century Hungary was divided: from 11 November 1526 Kraszna was part of the Eastern Hungarian Kingdom, which became an Ottoman vassal in 1529; the western part of Hungary became part of the Habsburg Monarchy. On 16 August 1570, by the Treaty of Speyer, the Eastern Hungarian Kingdom became the Principality of Transylvania. Kraszna was one of the counties of the Partium which were ruled by Transylvania but legally considered part of Hungary.

Kraszna remained under Transylvanian rule until the Treaty of Karlowitz in 26 January 1699, whereby Transylvania, the Partium and most of Ottoman-controlled Hungary passed to the Habsburg Monarchy. Transylvania formally became a crown land in the 1711 Treaty of Szatmár which ended Rákóczi's War of Independence, but the status of the Partium remained ambiguous until 1732, when Kraszna definitively became part of Transylvania, along with Közép-Szolnok County, Kővár District and the rump Zaránd County.

Between 1851 and 1860 the counties of Transylvania were abolished and replaced with Kreise; the territory of Kraszna County became part of the Klausenburger Kreis until 1854, then Kreis Szilágy-Somlyó. The counties were restored in 1860.

On 29 May 1867 the Austro-Hungarian Compromise, which transformed the Austrian Empire into Austria-Hungary, saw the abolishment of Transylvania; its counties fell directly under Hungarian rule, becoming part of "Transleithania".

In 1876 the Hungarian counties were restructured and the territory of Kraszna County passed to the new Szilágy County.

== Sources ==
- Benkő, Elek (1994). "Kraszna 2.". In Kristó, Gyula; Engel, Pál; Makk, Ferenc (eds.). Korai magyar történeti lexikon (9-14. század) [Encyclopedia of the Early Hungarian History (9th-14th centuries)] (in Hungarian). Akadémiai Kiadó. p. 380-381. ISBN 963-05-6722-9.
