= Carastelec (river) =

- Location within Romania

Location
- Country: Romania
- Counties: Sălaj County
- Villages: Carastelec

Physical characteristics
- Mouth: Crasna
  - location: Măeriște
  - coordinates: 47.3104°N 22.7896°E
- Length: 11 km (6.8 mi)
- Basin size: 23 km^{2} (8.9 sq mi)

Basin features
- Progression: Crasna→ Tisza→ Danube→ Black Sea

The Carastelec is a left tributary of the river Crasna in Romania. It discharges into the Crasna in Măeriște. Its length is 11 km (6.8 mi) and its basin size is 23 km^{2} (8.9 sq mi).
