= Reformed Church, Recea =

Church building in Vârșolț, Romania

Reformed Church in Recea _{Református templom}
- Romania

Religion
- Affiliation: Reformed Church in Romania
- Region: Sălaj County
- Ecclesiastical or organizational status: parish church
- Year consecrated: 15th century

Location
- Location: Recea, Sălaj
- Municipality: Recea, Sălaj
- State: Romania
- Interactive map of Reformed Church in Recea _{Református templom}
- Coordinates: 47.19486°N 22.95031°E

The Reformed Church (Romanian: Biserica Reformată; Hungarian: Református templom) is a church in Recea, Sălaj, Romania, completed in the 15th century.

The church belfry is listed as a historic monument.
