= Foieni =

Foieni Mezőfény, Fienen
- Commune
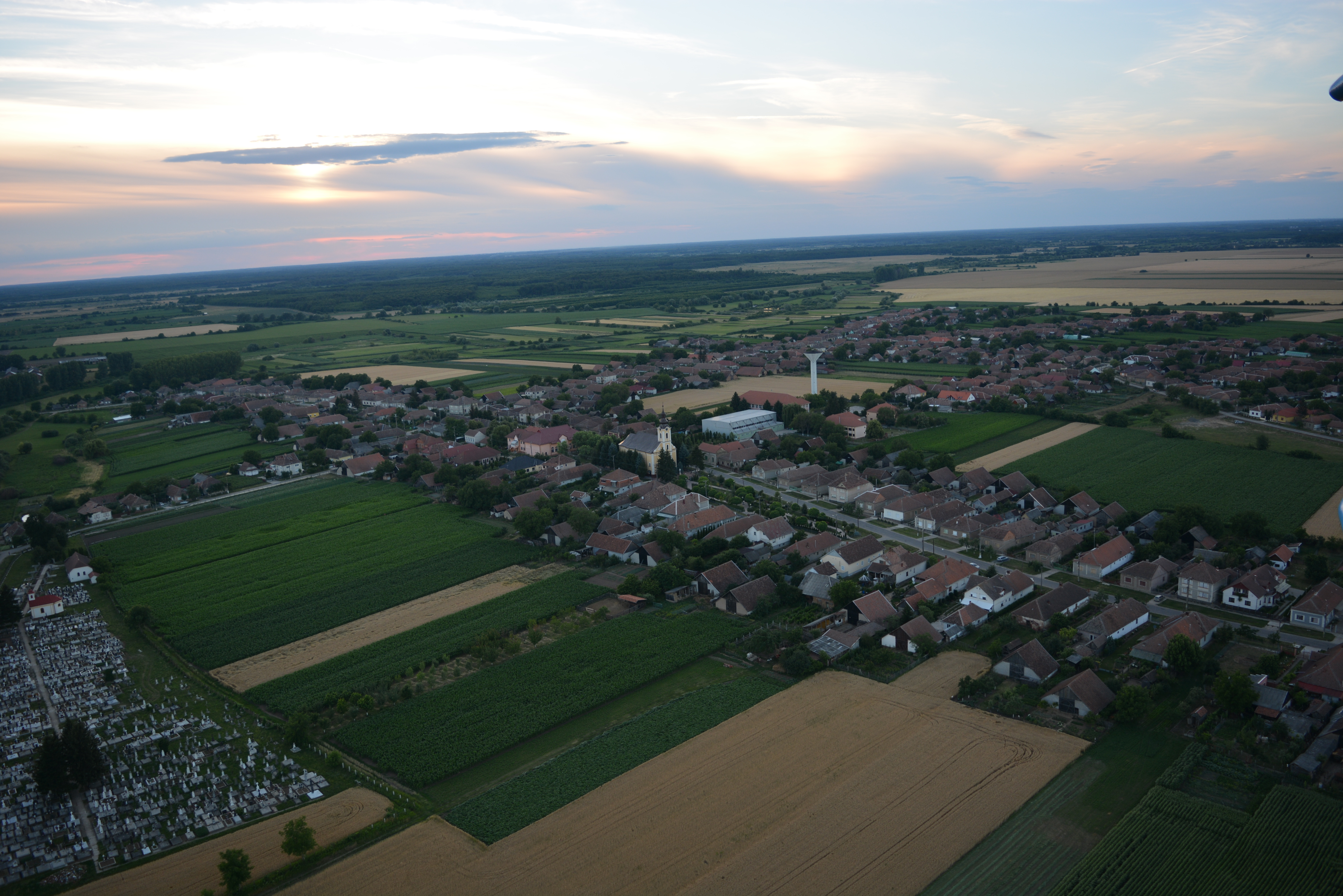
- Panoramic view of Foieni

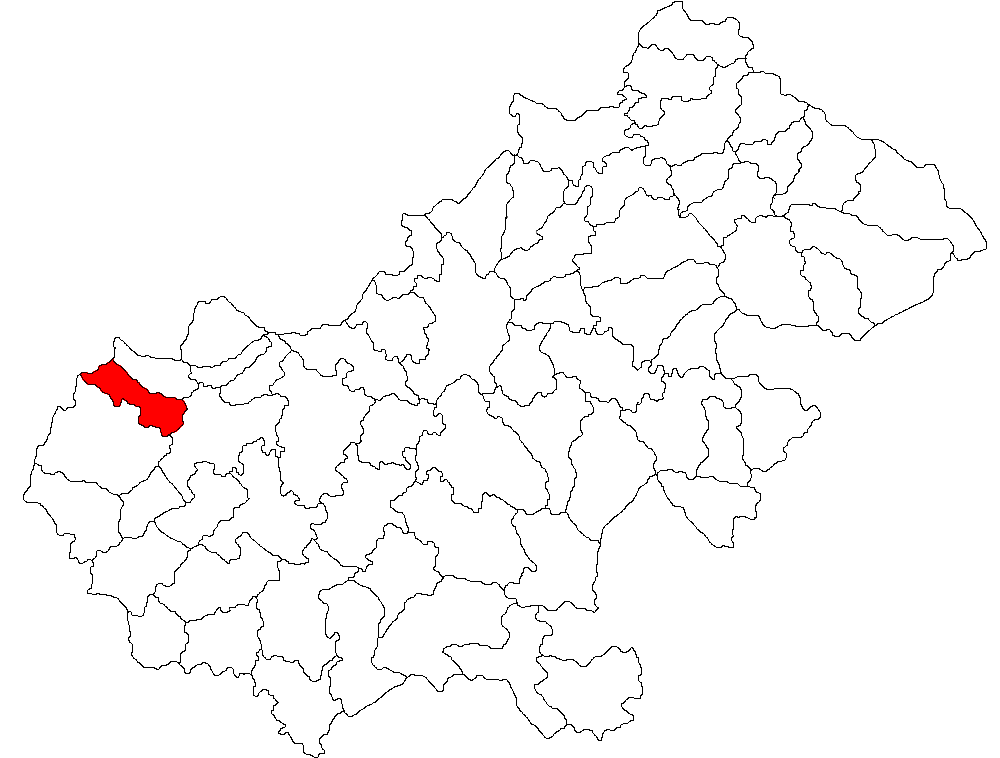
- Location in Satu Mare County

- Location in Romania
- Coordinates: 47°42′N 22°23′E
- Country: Romania
- County: Satu Mare

Government
  - Mayor (2024–2028): László Brém (UDMR)
- Area: 40.45 km^{2} (15.62 sq mi)
- Elevation: 124 m (407 ft)
- Population (2021-12-01): 1,725
  - Density: 42.65/km^{2} (110.5/sq mi)
- Time zone: UTC+02:00 (EET)
  - Summer (DST): UTC+03:00 (EEST)
- Postal code: 447135
- Vehicle reg.: SM
- Website: www.consiliullocalfoieni.ro

Foieni (Hungarian: Mezőfény, Hungarian pronunciation: [mɛzøːfeːni]; German: Fienen) is a commune of 1,836 inhabitants situated in Satu Mare County, Romania. It is composed of a single village, Foieni.

The commune is located in the western part of the county, at a distance of 6 km (3.7 mi) from Carei and 40 km (25 mi) from the county seat, Satu Mare. It borders Hungary to the west, the city of Carei to the east, Ciumești commune to the south, and Urziceni commune to the north.

The Foieni sand dunes is a 10 ha (25 acres) protected area located on the territory of the commune.

== Administration ==
The current local council has the following political composition, based on the results of the votes cast at the 2024 Romanian local elections.

Party	Seats	Current Council
Democratic Alliance of Hungarians in Romania (UDMR/RMDSZ)	9	
Democratic Forum of Germans in Romania (FDGR/DFDR)	2	

== Demographics ==
Ethnic groups (2011 census):

- Hungarians: 69% (55.52% in 2002)
- Germans: 21.1% (41.60% in 2002)
- Romanis: 5.6% (0.00% in 2002)
- Romanians: 3.7% (2.81% in 2002)

According to mother tongue, 96.38% of the population speak Hungarian as their first language.

== Rețele sociale ==
- Mezőfényiek csoportja (Facebook)
