= Szilágy County =

County of the Kingdom of Hungary

Szilágy County Comitatus Silagiensis (Latin) Szilágy vármegye (Hungarian) Komitat Szilagy (German) Comitatul Sălaj (Romanian)
- County of the Kingdom of Hungary (1876-1920, 1940-1945)
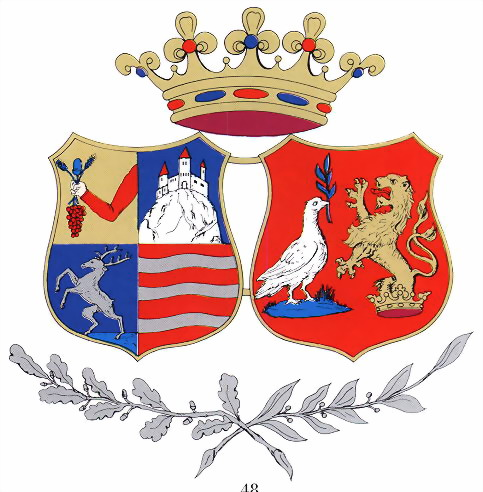
- Coat of arms

- Capital: Zilah
- Area
  - Coordinates: 47°11′N 23°3′E
  - 1910: 3,815 km^{2} (1,473 sq mi)
- Population
  - 1910: 230,100
- History
  - Established: 1876
  - Treaty of Trianon: 4 June 1920
  - County recreated (Second Vienna Award): 30 August 1940
  - Disestablished: 1945
- Today part of: Romania
- Zalău is the current name of the capital.

Szilágy (Romanian: Sălaj) was an administrative county (comitatus) of the Kingdom of Hungary. Its territory is now in north-western Romania. The capital of the county was Zilah (present-day Zalău in Romania).

== Geography ==
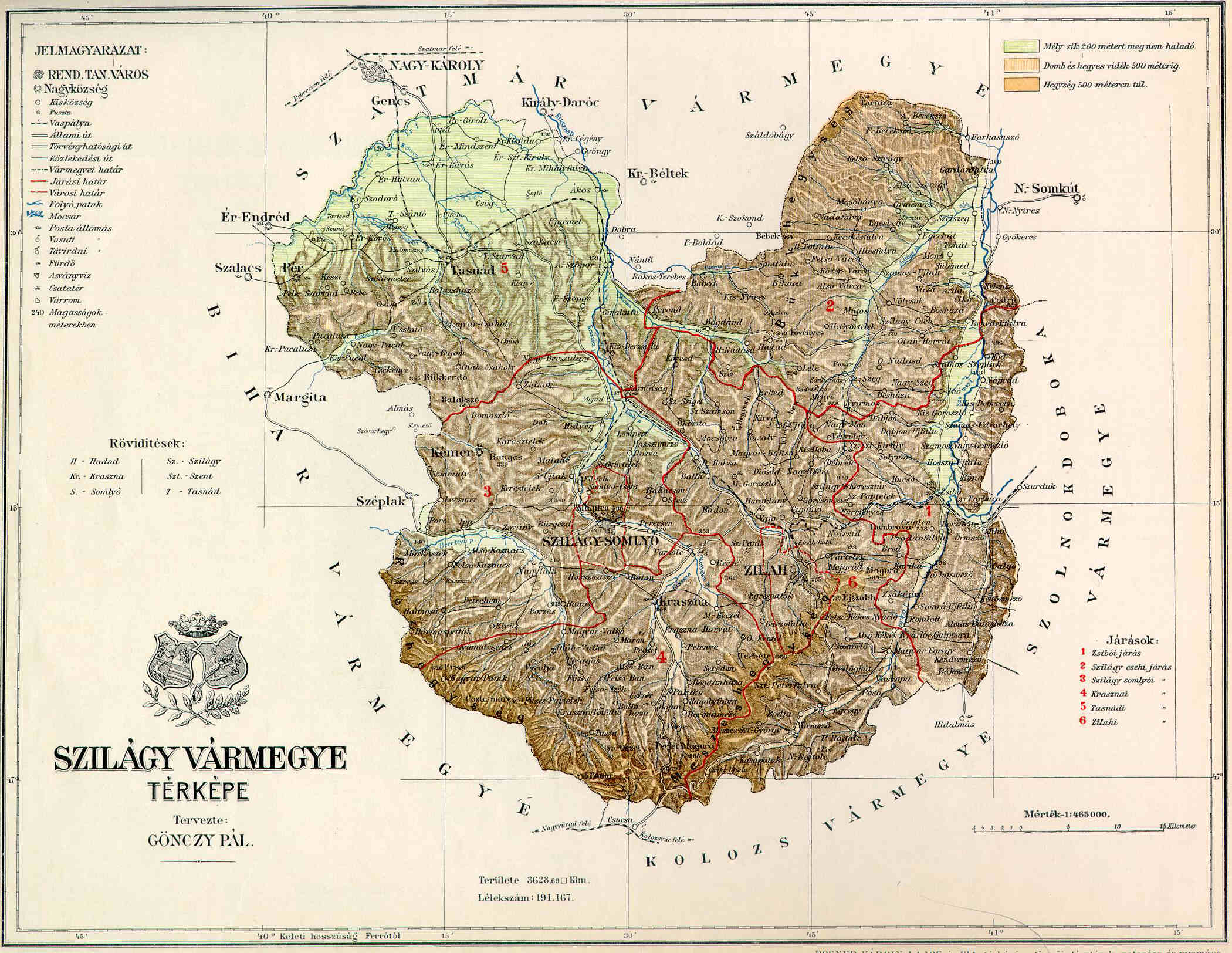
Map of Szilagy, 1891.

Szilágy county shared borders with the Hungarian counties of Bihar, Szatmár, Szolnok-Doboka and Kolozs. The rivers Someş and Crasna flowed through the county. Its territory was largely the same as that of the present Romanian county Sălaj. Its area was 3,815 km^{2} around 1910.

== History ==
Szilágy county was formed in 1876, when the counties of Kraszna (its center was Kraszna/Crasna at first, then Valkóváralja/Sub Cetate, later Szilágysomlyó/Șimleu Silvaniei), Közép-Szolnok (its center was Zilah/Zalău) and the Egregy/Agrij district of Doboka County were united.

The county consisted of two regions, Szilágy and Kővár-vidék. Kővár-vidék was a special administrative region in the Medieval and Early Modern Era Hungary administered by a Captain general.

In 1920, by the Treaty of Trianon, the county became part of Romania. It was returned to Hungary by the Second Vienna Award in 1940, with a slightly modified territory. After World War II, it became again part of Romania. Most of it is now part of the Romanian county Sălaj, except for some areas in the north-west (now in Satu Mare county) and north-east (now in Maramureş county).

== Demographics ==
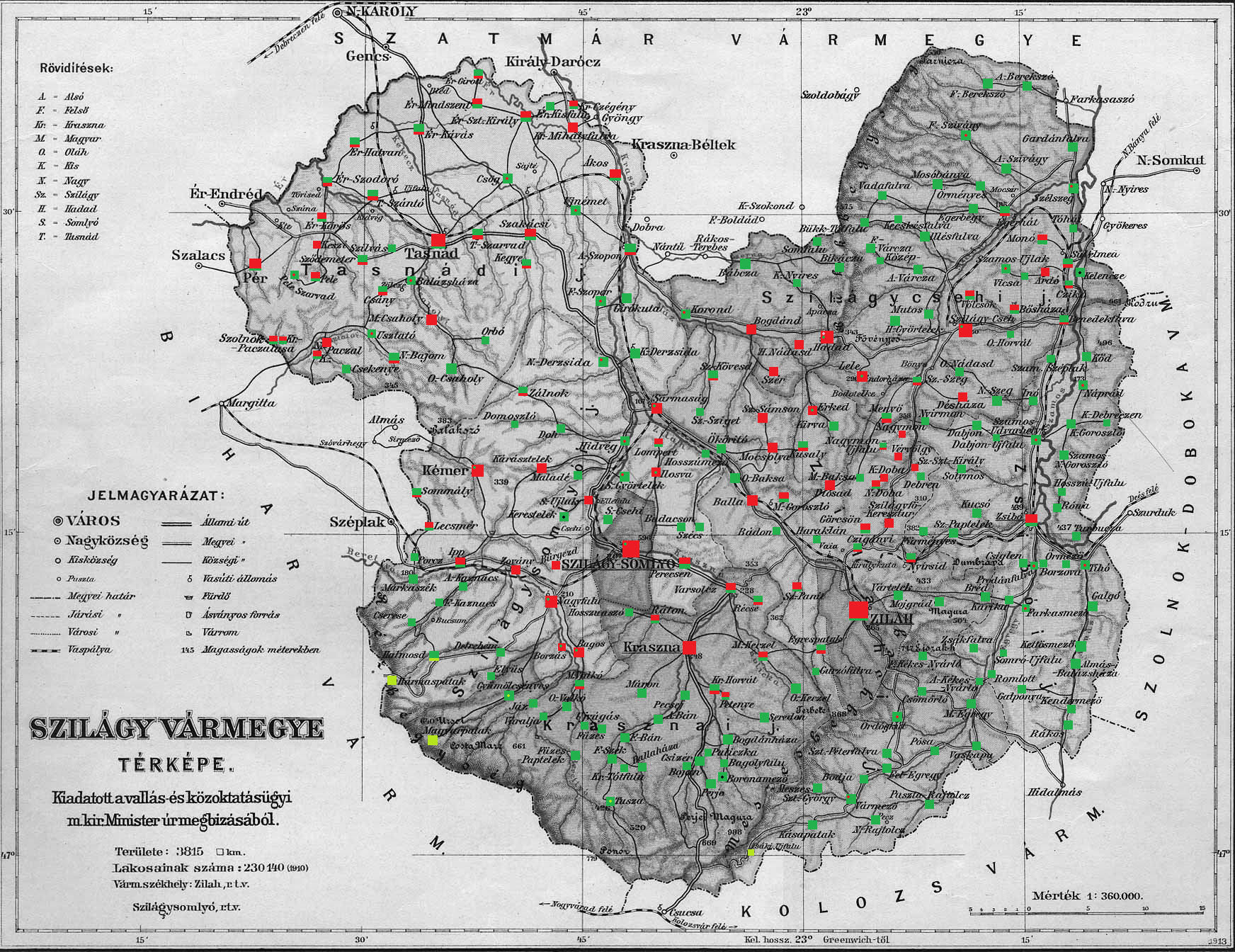
Ethnic map of the county with data of the 1910 census (see the key in the description)

Population by mother tongue (Note: Only linguistic communities > 1% are displayed.)
Census	Total	Romanian	Hungarian	Slovak	Other or unknown
1880	171,079	103,307 (61.97%)	58,224 (34.93%)	2,133 (1.28%)	3,028 (1.82%)
1890	191,167	117,711 (61.57%)	67,275 (35.19%)	2,330 (1.22%)	3,851 (2.01%)
1900	207,293	125,451 (60.52%)	76,482 (36.90%)	2,873 (1.39%)	2,487 (1.20%)
1910	230,140	136,087 (59.13%)	87,312 (37.94%)	3,727 (1.62%)	3,014 (1.31%)

Population by religion (Note: Only religious communities > 1% are displayed.)
Census	Total	Greek Catholic	Calvinist	Roman Catholic	Jewish	Eastern Orthodox	Other or unknown
1880	171,079	100,749 (58,89%)	46,199 (27.00%)	9,289 (5.43%)	6,964 (4.07%)	7,129 (4.17%)	749 (0.44%)
1890	191,167	111,211 (58,17%)	51,512 (26.95%)	10,955 (5.73%)	8,435 (4.41%)	8,337 (4.36%)	717 (0.38%)
1900	207,293	120,544 (58.15%)	55,952 (26.99%)	13,243 (6.39%)	8,887 (4.29%)	7,902 (3.81%)	765 (0.37%)
1910	230,140	132,741 (57.68%)	60,938 (26.48%)	15,569 (6.77%)	9,849 (4.28%)	9,801 (4.26%)	1,242 (0.54%)

== Subdivisions ==
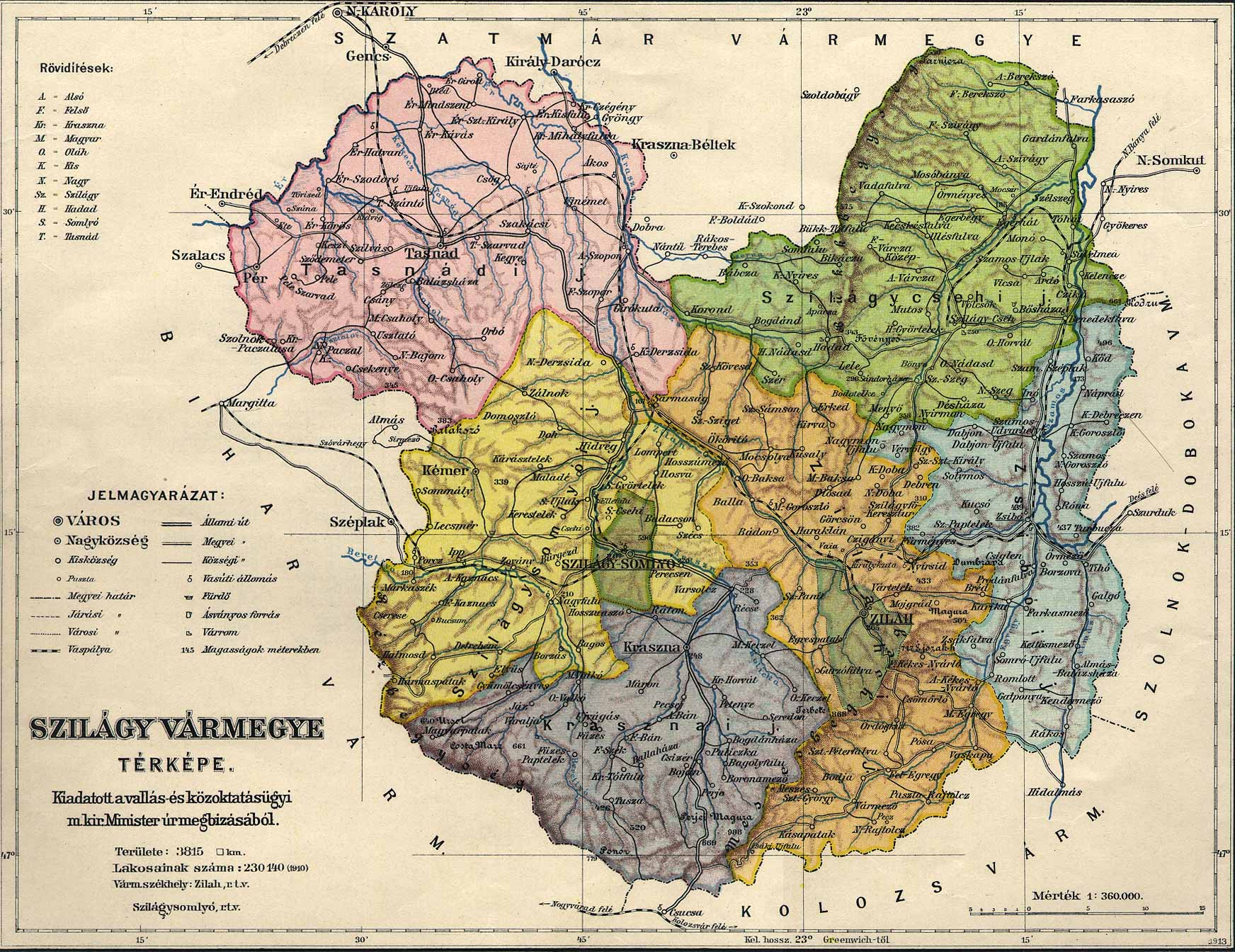

In the early 20th century, the subdivisions of Szilágy county were:

Districts (járás)
District	Capital
Kraszna	Kraszna (now Crasna)
Szilágycseh	Szilágycseh (now Cehu Silvaniei)
Szilágysomlyó	Szilágysomlyó (now Șimleu Silvaniei)
Tasnád	Tasnád (now Tăşnad)
Zilah	Zilah (now Zalău)
Zsibó	Zsibó (now Jibou)
Urban districts (rendezett tanácsú város)
Szilágysomlyó (now Șimleu Silvaniei)
Zilah (now Zalău)

== See also ==
- Szilágyi surname
