= Lake Vârșolț =

Vârșolț Reservoir
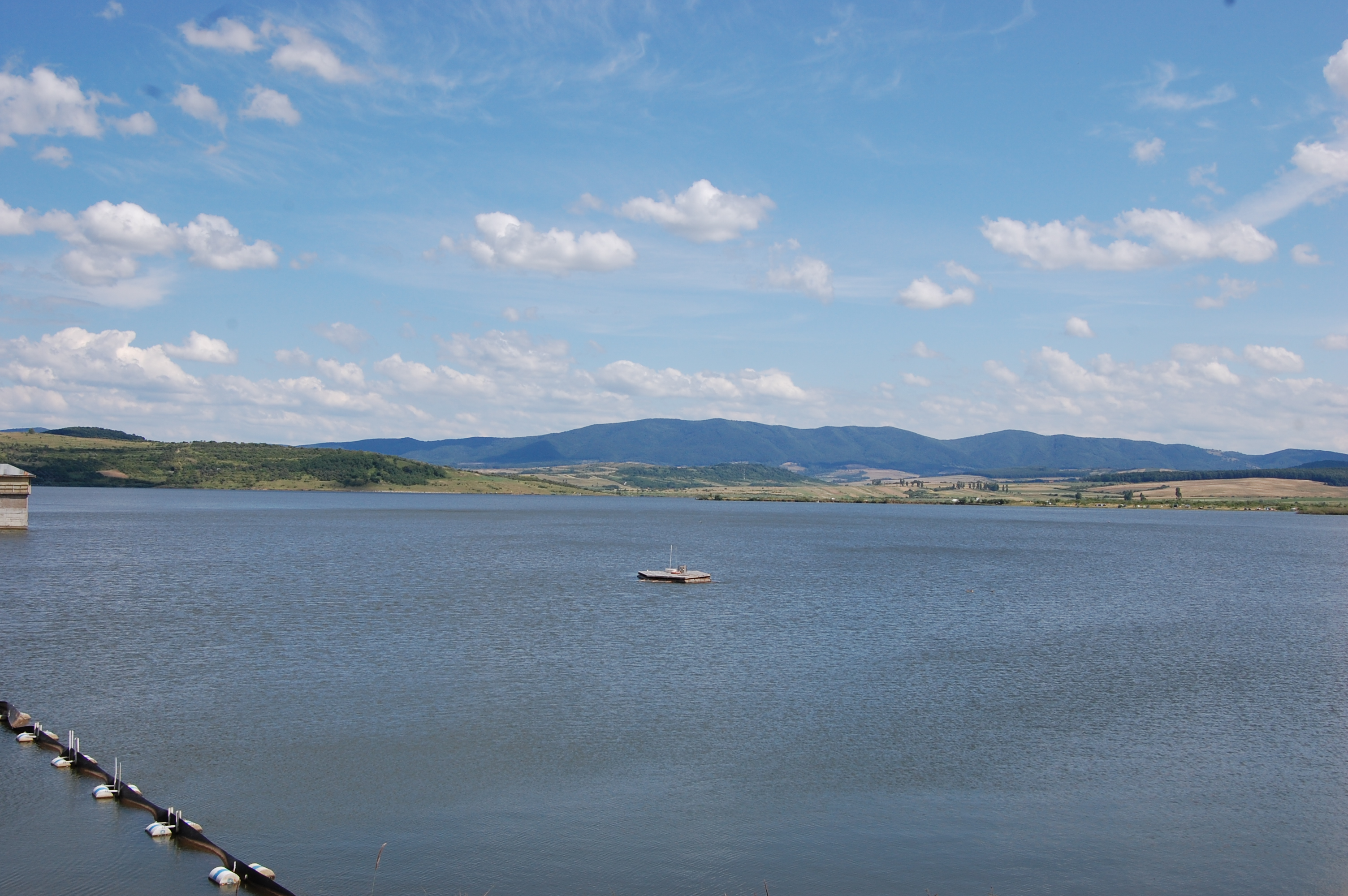

- Location within Romania
- Official name: Lacul de acumulare Vârșolț
- Country: Romania
- Location: Vârșolț, Crasna
- Coordinates: 47°10′49″N 22°54′56″E
- Construction began: 1976
- Opening date: 1979

Dam and spillways
- Height: 17 m (56 ft)
- Length: 2,160 m (7,090 ft)
- Dam volume: 50,200,000 m^{3} (40,700 acre⋅ft)

Reservoir
- Surface area: 6.52 km^{2} (2.52 sq mi)

Vârșolț Reservoir (Romanian: Lacul de acumulare Vârșolț) is the largest lake in Sălaj County, Romania.

It is a reservoir, made in 1976–1979. Vârșolț Lake is situated in the Crasna River basin, between Crasna and Vârșolț. The dam has a height of 17 m (56 ft) and a length of 2,160 m (7,090 ft). The lake has a surface area of 652 ha (1,610 acres) and a volume of 50.2 million m^{3} (1.77 billion cu ft) of water. The lake was created as floods mitigation and protection against floodings. Created after the 1970 floods in Romania, the lake controls the water output of the Crasna River. Vârșolț Lake is a drinking water source for Zalău and Șimleu Silvaniei towns.
