= Szilágyi =

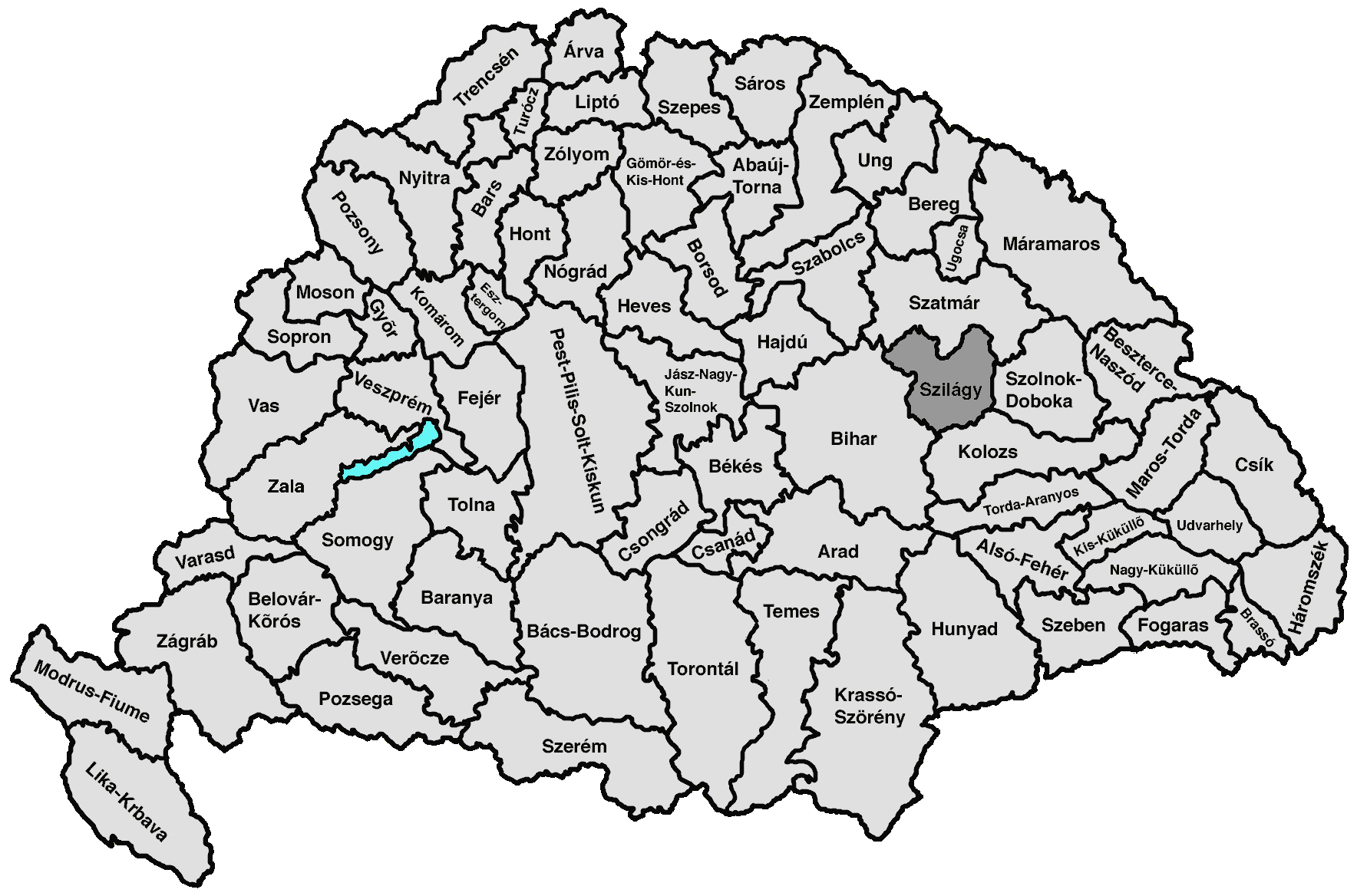
A map of the Kingdom of Hungary showing the location of Szilágyi

Present day location of Sălaj County on the map of Romania

Szilágyi (Romanian: Sălăjean) is a Hungarian surname. It also refers to a county in the Kingdom of Hungary by the name of Szilágy. The region has been part of Romania since 1918.

== Description ==
The actual name means either from the county of Szilágy or of the noble clan of Szilagyi. The original Hungarian spelling of the name is "Szilágyi"; it has been modified to "Silaghi" in its Romanian variation. The Hungarian letters "Sz" and "gy" are replaced by the similarly pronounced "S" and "g" respectively in the Romanian version of the name.

The Szilágyi clan exerted a strong influence over this region of Europe during the late to middle 14th century.

== People with the surname ==
- House of Szilágyi
- Ágnes Szilágyi
- Áron Szilágyi
- Dezső Szilágyi
- Erzsébet Szilágyi
- Gábor Szilágyi
- György Szilágyi
- Ilona Szilágyi
- István Szilágyi
- János György Szilágyi
- Katalin Szilágyi
- László Szilágyi (judoka)
- László Szilágyi (politician)
- Liliána Szilágyi
- Loránd Szilágyi
- Michael Szilágyi
- Péter Szilágyi (footballer)
- Péter Szilágyi (politician, 1954)
- Péter Szilágyi (politician, 1981)
- Zoltán Szilágyi (swimmer)
- Zoltán Szilágyi Varga
- Zsolt Szilágyi (footballer)
- Zsolt Szilágyi (politician)
- Čaba Silađi
