= Zănicel =

- Location within Romania

Location
- Country: Romania
- Counties: Sălaj County
- Villages: Zalnoc, Bobota

Physical characteristics
- Mouth: Crasna
  - location: Bobota
  - coordinates: 47.3838°N 22.7868°E
- Length: 11 km (6.8 mi)
- Basin size: 27 km^{2} (10 sq mi)

Basin features
- Progression: Crasna→ Tisza→ Danube→ Black Sea

The Zănicel is a left tributary of the river Crasna in Romania. It flows into the Crasna in Bobota. Its length is 11 km (6.8 mi) and its basin size is 27 km^{2} (10 sq mi).
