= Ponița =

- Location within Romania

Location
- Country: Romania
- Counties: Sălaj
- Villages: Hurez, Stârciu

Physical characteristics
- Mouth: Crasna
  - coordinates: 47.1115°N 22.9010°E
- Length: 12 km (7.5 mi)
- Basin size: 48 km^{2} (19 sq mi)

Basin features
- Progression: Crasna→ Tisza→ Danube→ Black Sea

The Ponița is a right tributary of the river Crasna in Romania. It discharges into the Crasna near Horoatu Crasnei. Its length is 12 km (7.5 mi) and its basin size is 48 km^{2} (19 sq mi).
