= Bănișor =

- Commune
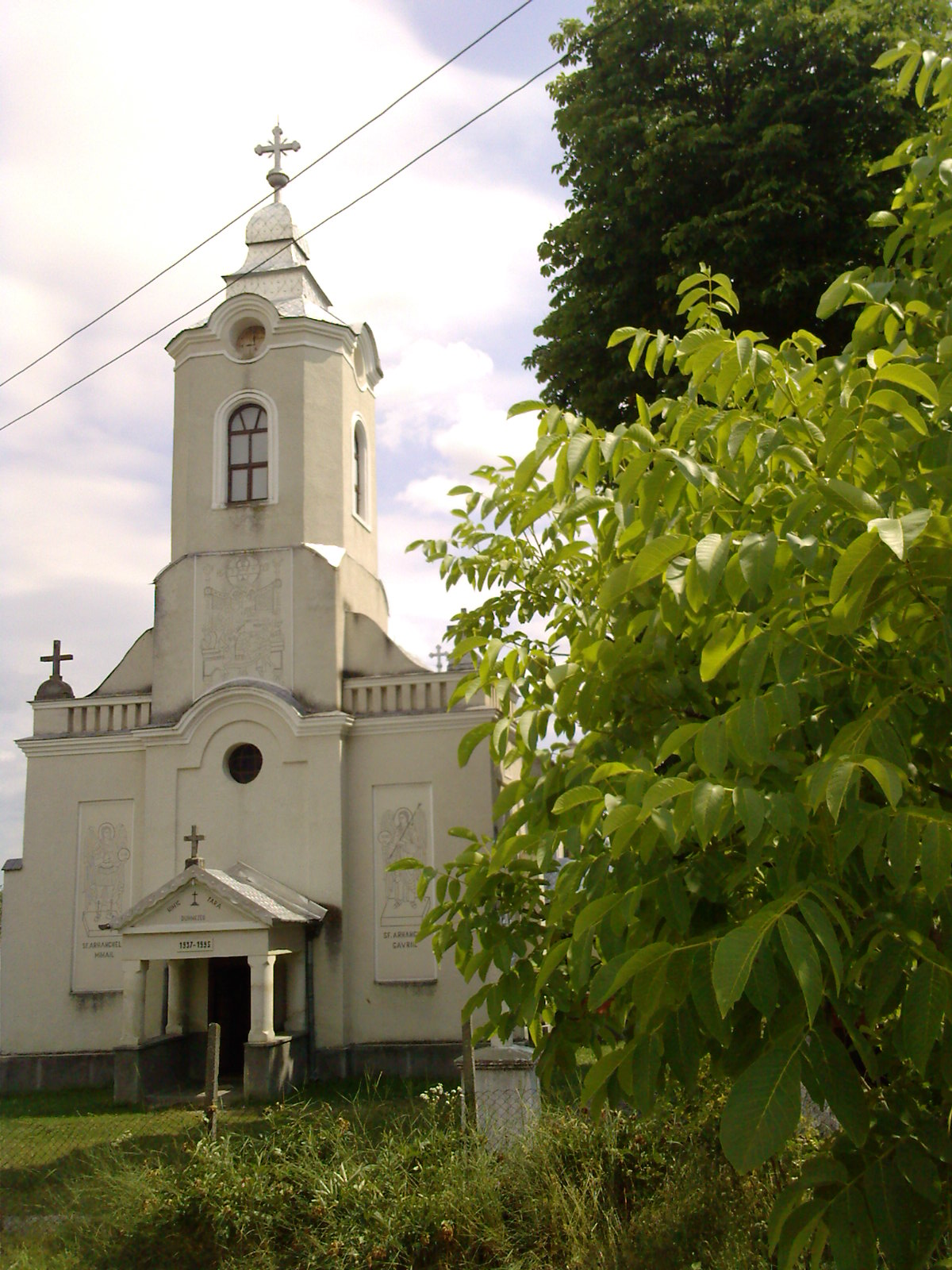
- Orthodox church of Ban

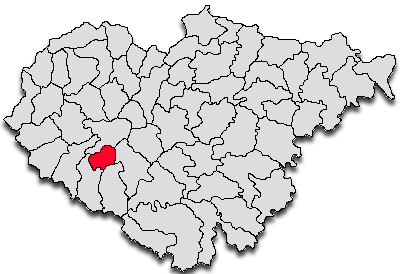
- Location in Sălaj County

- Location in Romania
- Coordinates: 47°6′18″N 22°50′20″E
- Country: Romania
- County: Sălaj

Government
  - Mayor (2020–2024): Eugen-Sorin Maxim (PSD)
- Area: 32.10 km^{2} (12.39 sq mi)
- Elevation: 294 m (965 ft)
- Population (2021-12-01): 1,824
  - Density: 56.82/km^{2} (147.2/sq mi)
- Time zone: UTC+02:00 (EET)
  - Summer (DST): UTC+03:00 (EEST)
- Postal code: 457030
- Area code: +(40) 0260
- Vehicle reg.: SJ
- Website: www.primariabanisor.ro

Bănișor (Hungarian: Alsóbán) is a commune located in Sălaj County, Crișana, Romania. It is composed of three villages: Ban (Felsőbán), Bănișor, and Peceiu (Pecsely).
