= Pria (Crasna) =

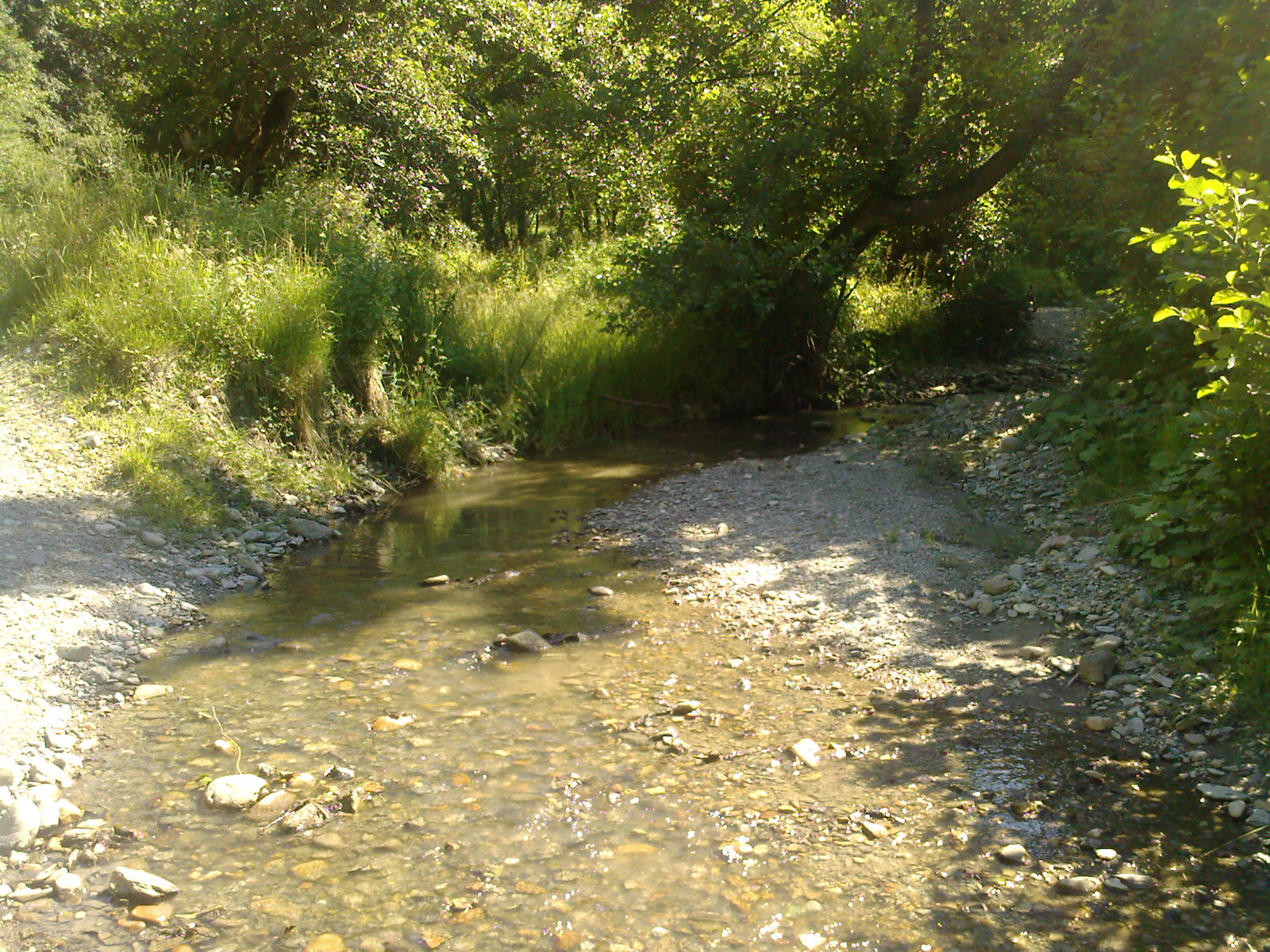

- Location within Romania

Location
- Country: Romania
- Counties: Sălaj County
- Villages: Pria

Physical characteristics
- Mouth: Crasna
  - coordinates: 47.0870°N 22.8912°E
- Length: 9 km (5.6 mi)
- Basin size: 20 km^{2} (7.7 sq mi)

Basin features
- Progression: Crasna→ Tisza→ Danube→ Black Sea

The Pria is a right tributary of the river Crasna in Romania. It discharges into the Crasna in Plesca. Its length is 9 km (5.6 mi) and its basin size is 20 km^{2} (7.7 sq mi).
