= Vârșolț =

Vârșolț Varsolc
- Commune
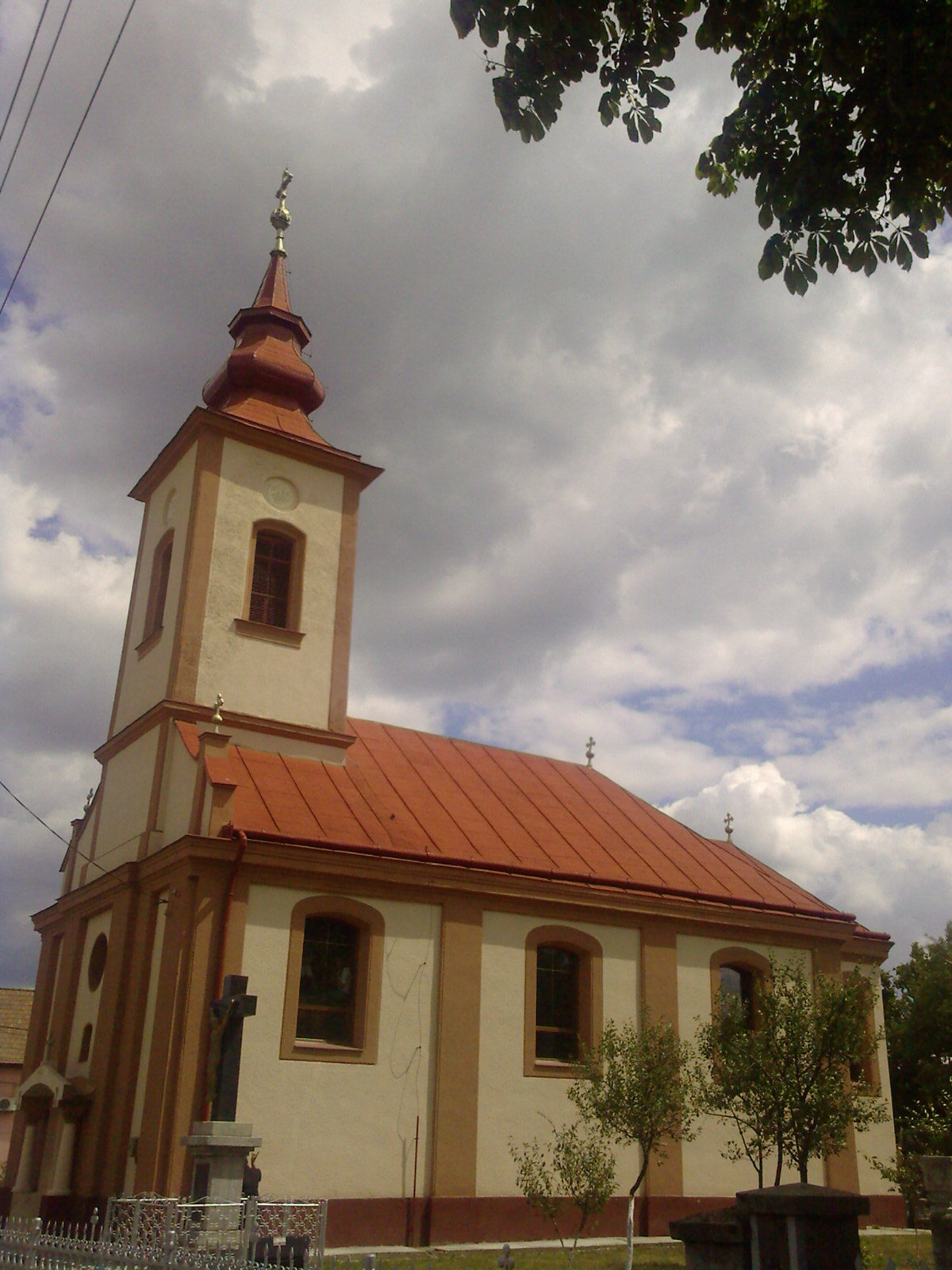
- Romanian Orthodox church in Vârșolț

- Location in Sălaj County

- Location in Romania
- Coordinates: 47°12′N 22°56′E
- Country: Romania
- County: Sălaj

Government
  - Mayor (2024–2028): Lajos Breda (UDMR)
- Area: 31.81 km^{2} (12.28 sq mi)
- Elevation: 224 m (735 ft)
- Population (2021-12-01): 2,069
  - Density: 65.04/km^{2} (168.5/sq mi)
- Time zone: UTC+02:00 (EET)
  - Summer (DST): UTC+03:00 (EEST)
- Postal code: 457355
- Area code: +(40) 0260
- Vehicle reg.: SJ
- Website: primariavarsolt.ro

Vârșolț (Hungarian: Varsolc) is a commune located in Sălaj County, Crișana, Romania. It is composed of three villages: Recea (Krasznarécse), Recea Mică (Kisrécsepuszta), and Vârșolț.

At the 2002 census, the commune had 2,457 inhabitants, of which 64.1% were Hungarians, 32.4% Romanians, and 3.4% Roma; 58.6% were Reformed, 33.5% Romanian Orthodox, 3.5% Baptist, and 1.9% Roman Catholic. At the 2021 census, Vârșolț had a population of 2,069; of those, 64.48% were Hungarians, 27.4% Romanians, and 4.16% Roma.

== History ==
The Reformed Church in Recea was completed in the 15th century.

The Reformed church in Vârșolț was completed in 1774.

Lake Vârșolț was built between 1976 and 1979.
