= Crasna, Sălaj =

Crasna Kraszna
- Commune
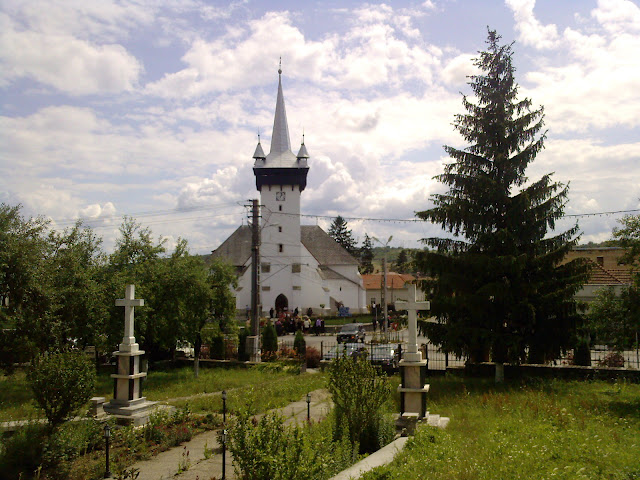
- Reformed Church in Crasna

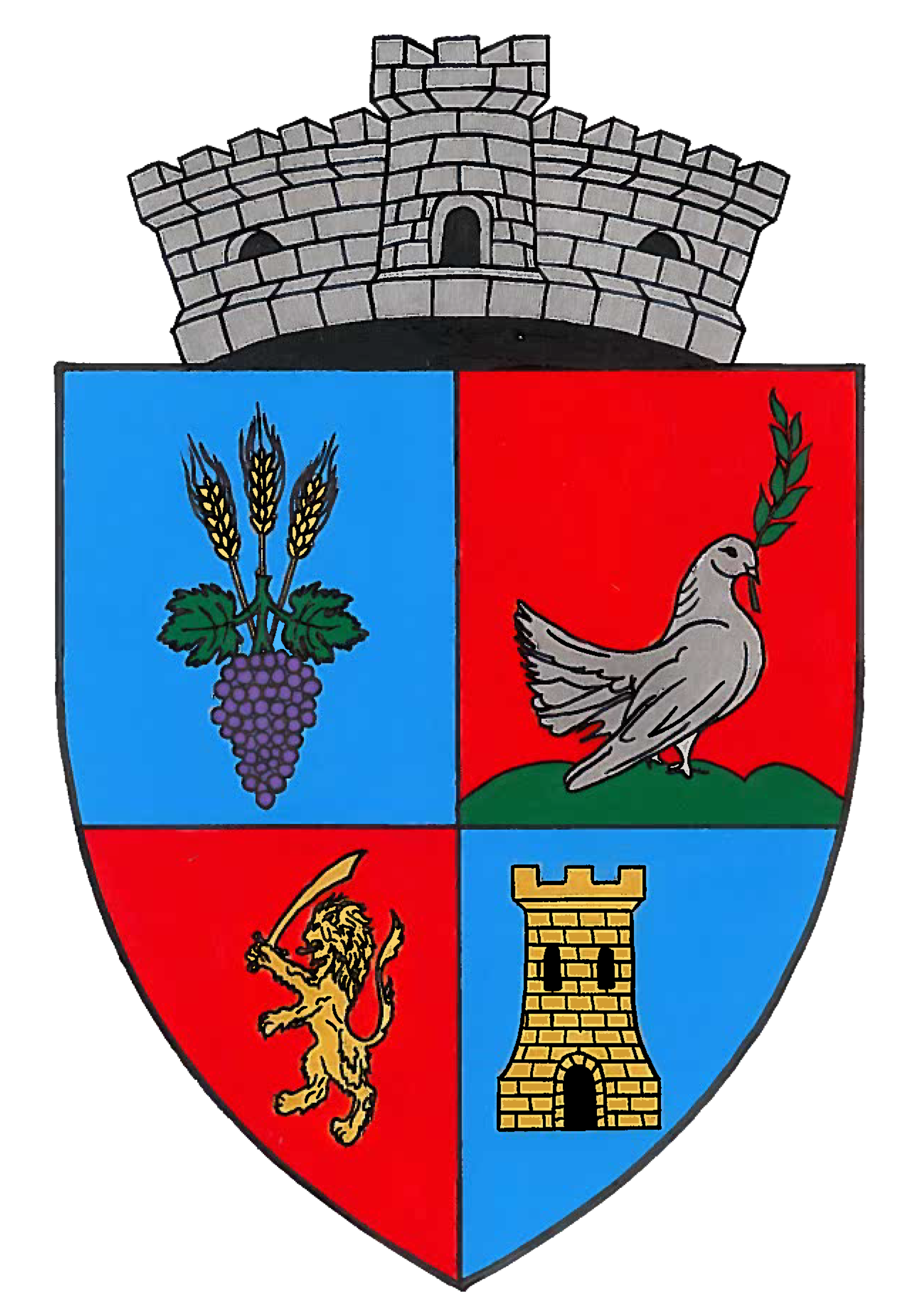
- Coat of arms

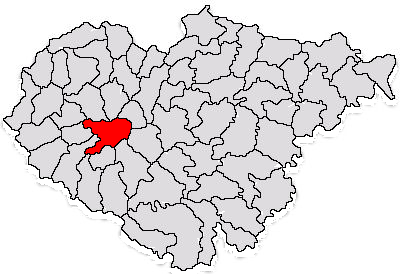
- Location in Sălaj County

- Location in Romania
- Coordinates: 47°9′36″N 22°52′29″E
- Country: Romania
- County: Sălaj

Government
  - Mayor (2020–2024): István Kovács (UDMR)
- Area: 67.12 km^{2} (25.92 sq mi)
- Elevation: 380 m (1,250 ft)
- Population (2021-12-01): 6,024
  - Density: 89.75/km^{2} (232.5/sq mi)
- Time zone: UTC+02:00 (EET)
  - Summer (DST): UTC+03:00 (EEST)
- Postal code: 457085
- Area code: +(40) 0260
- Vehicle reg.: SJ
- Website: primariacrasna.ro

Crasna or Kraszna (Romanian: Crasna; Hungarian: Kraszna) is a commune in Sălaj County, Crișana, Romania. It lies 14 km (8.7 mi) northwest of Zalău and 11 km (6.8 mi) southeast of Șimleu Silvaniei, on the river Crasna. It is composed of four villages: Crasna, Huseni (Krasznahosszúaszó), Marin (Máron), and Ratin (Ráton).

== History ==
Its name originates from the Slavic word krasna, meaning "beautiful". The village was first mentioned in 1213, as Karasna. It had a castle which was still inhabited in the 17th century. It was the county seat of the historical Kraszna county of the Kingdom of Hungary until 1876. Later it belonged to the Kraszna district of Szilágy County. After the collapse of Austria-Hungary at the end of World War I and the declaration of the Union of Transylvania with Romania, the Romanian Army took control of the locality in April 1919, during the Hungarian–Romanian War. The town officially became part of the territory ceded to the Kingdom of Romania in June 1920 under the terms of the Treaty of Trianon. During the interwar period, it became the headquarters of plasa Crasna, in Sălaj County. In August 1940, under the auspices of Nazi Germany, which imposed the Second Vienna Award, Hungary retook the territory of Northern Transylvania (which included Crasna) from Romania. Towards the end of World War II, however, the commune was taken back from Hungarian and German troops by Romanian and Soviet forces in October 1944. In 1950, it fell within the Cluj Region; in 1968, a new administrative law was adopted, and Horoatu Crasnei became once again part of Zalău County.

== Population ==
- In 1910 it had 3,884 residents, with a significant Hungarian majority (3790 people).
- In 2002, the commune had 6,373 inhabitants: 63.8% Hungarians, 28% Romanians, and 8.1% Roma; 53.1% were Reformed, 30% Romanian Orthodox, 9.4% Baptist, 2.1% each Seventh-day Adventist and Greek-Catholic, and 1.7% Roman Catholic.
- At the 2011 census, it had 6,485 residents, with a significant Hungarian majority (4,103 people).
- At the 2021 census, Crasna had a population of 6,024; of those, 61.99% were Hungarians, 20.05% Romanians, and 11.42% Roma.

== Sights to see ==
- Reformed church, built in the late 14th century; with 4 spires and a painted sunken panel ceiling which was made in the 17th century.
- Reformed Church in Ratin
- Orthodox Church in Crasna
- Greek Catholic Church in Marin
- Lake Vârșolț

== Image gallery ==
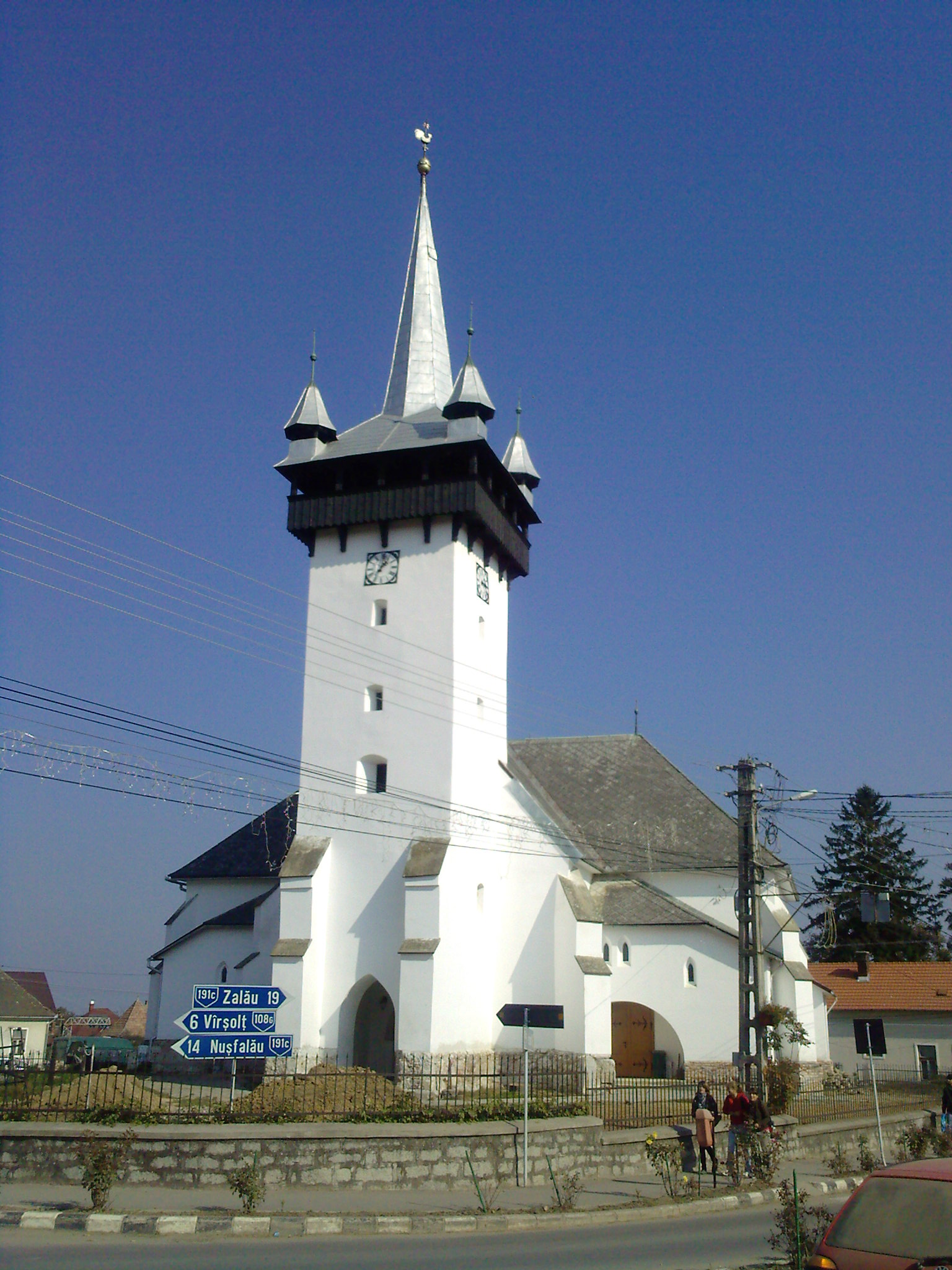
Reformed church (Crasna)

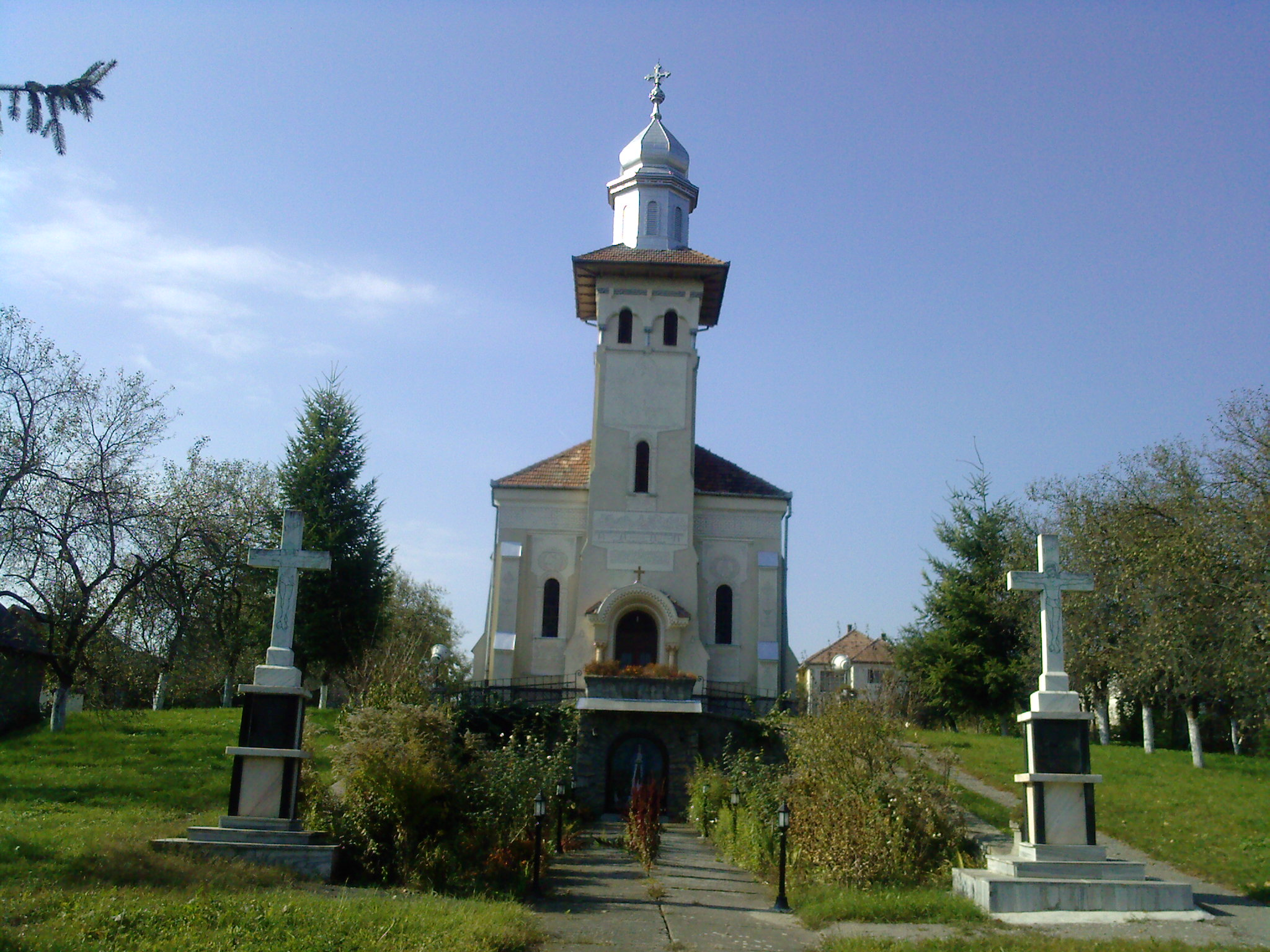
Orthodox church (Crasna)

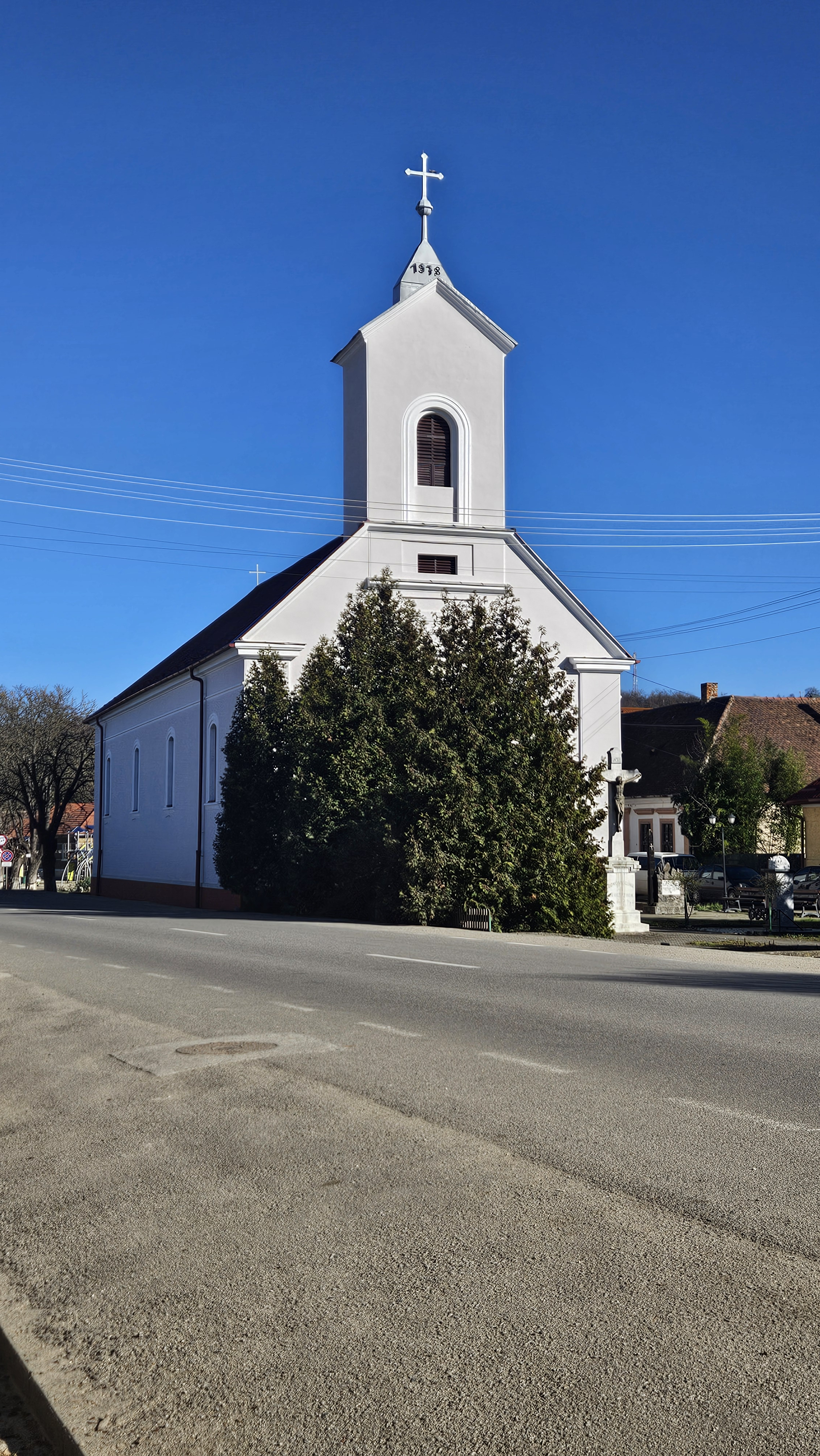
Roman Catholic church

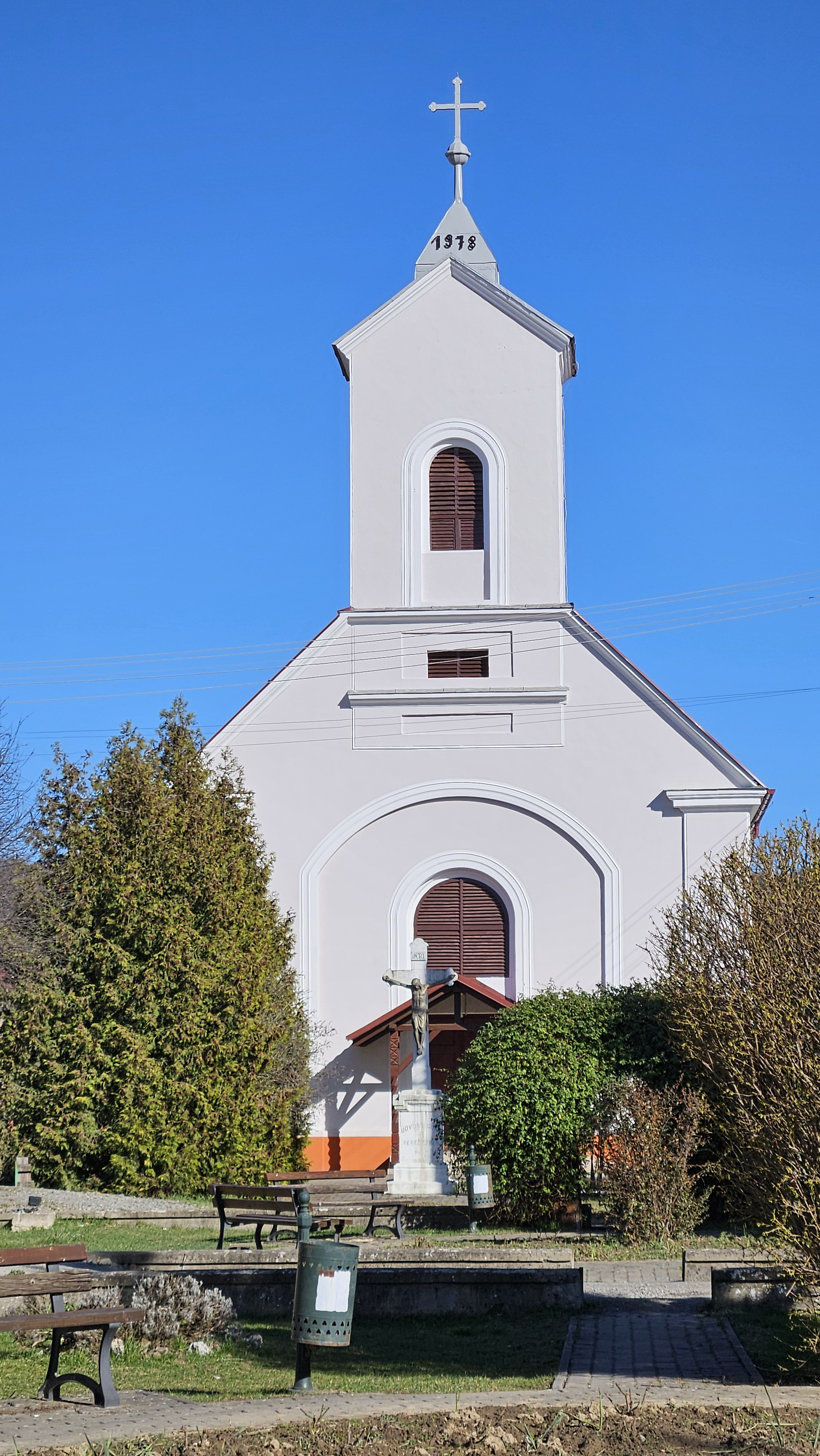
Roman Catholic church

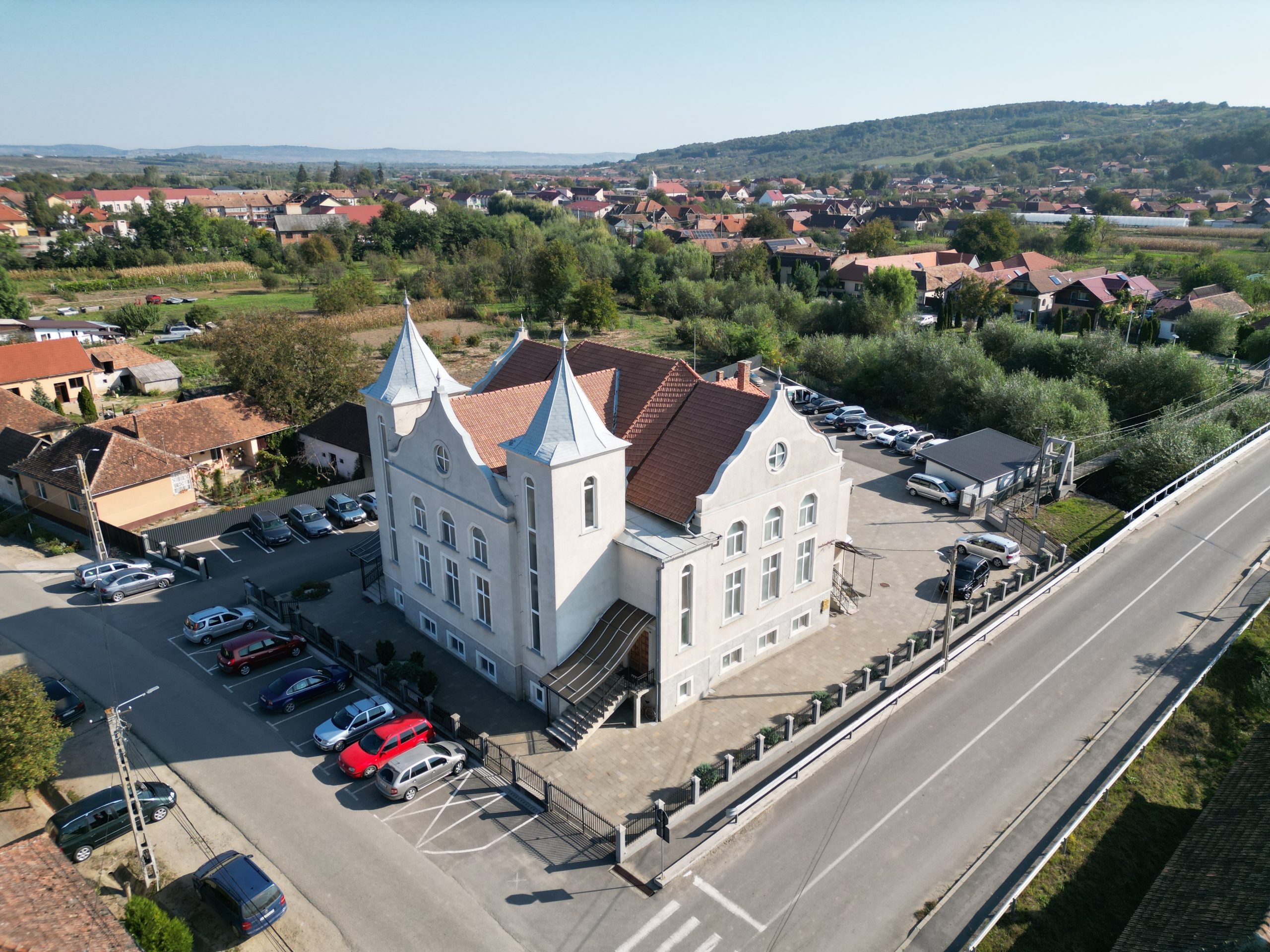
Hungarian Baptist church

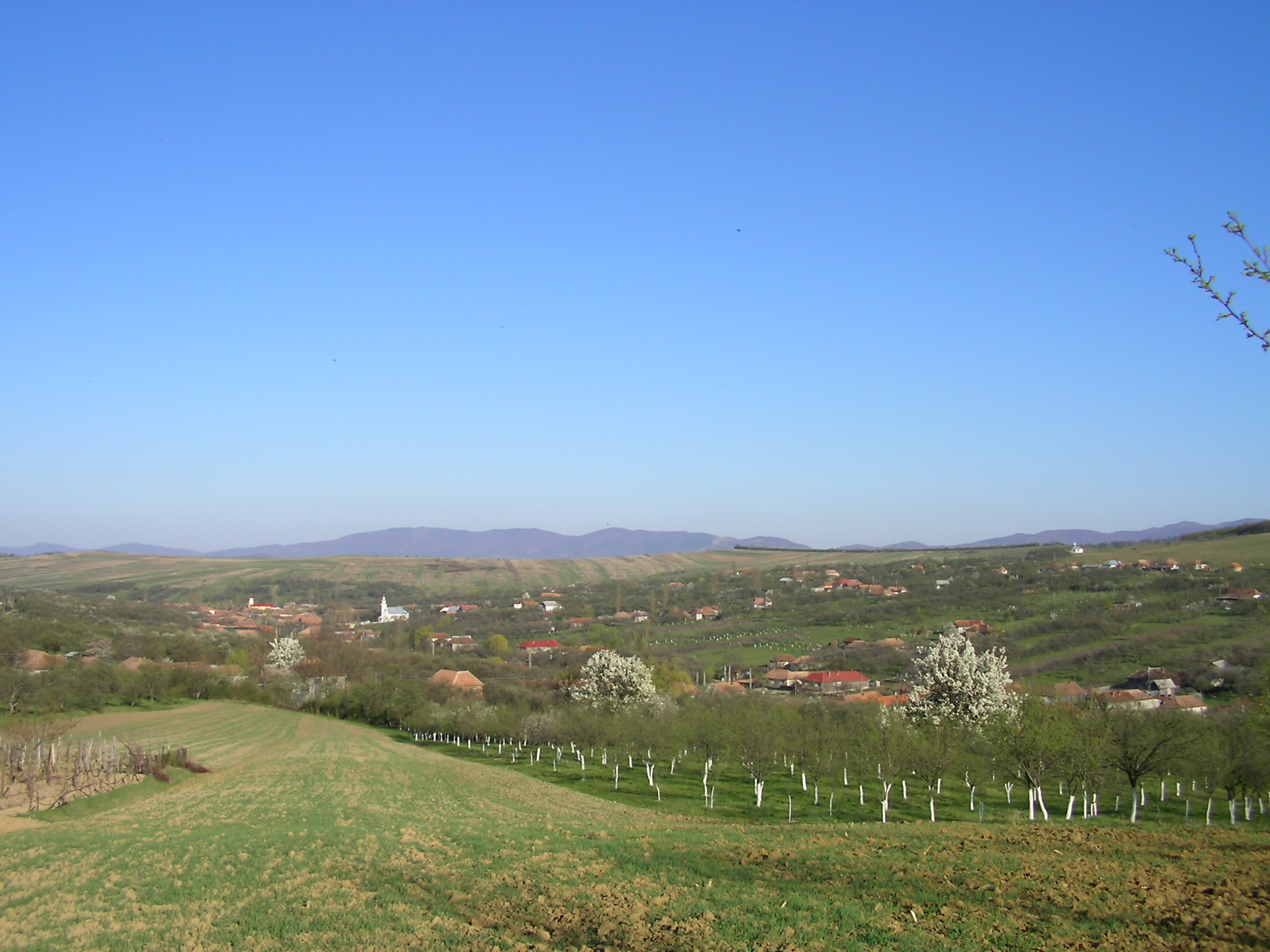
Marin

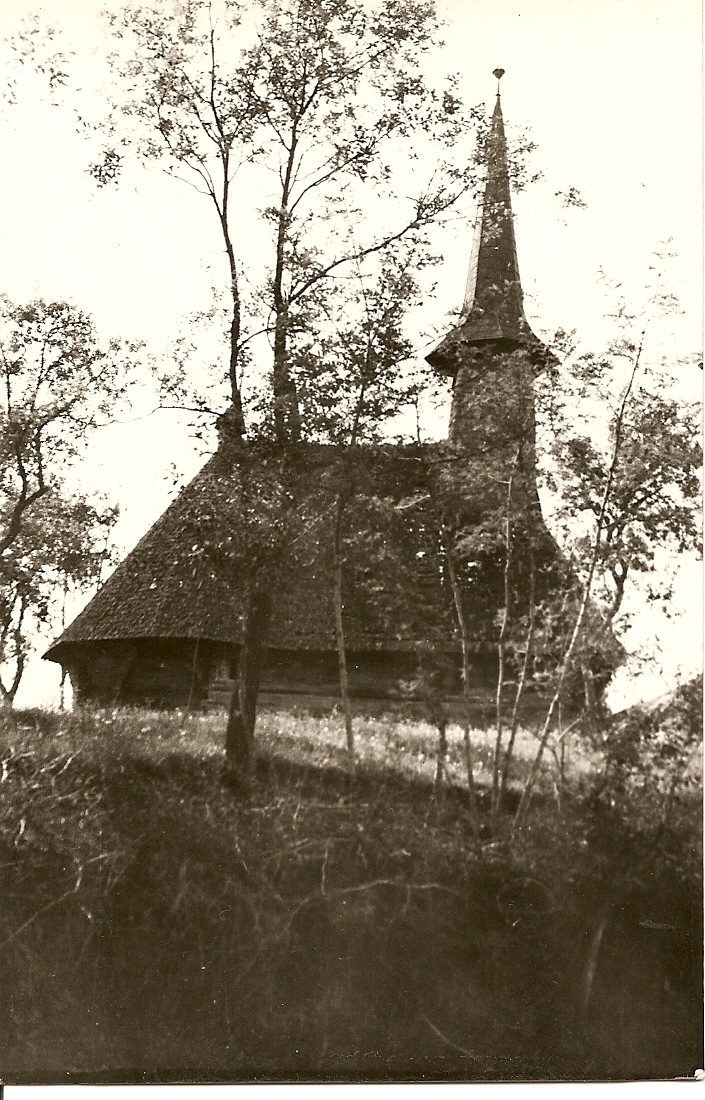
Greek-Catholic church, dedicated 1780, demolished 1967 (Marin)

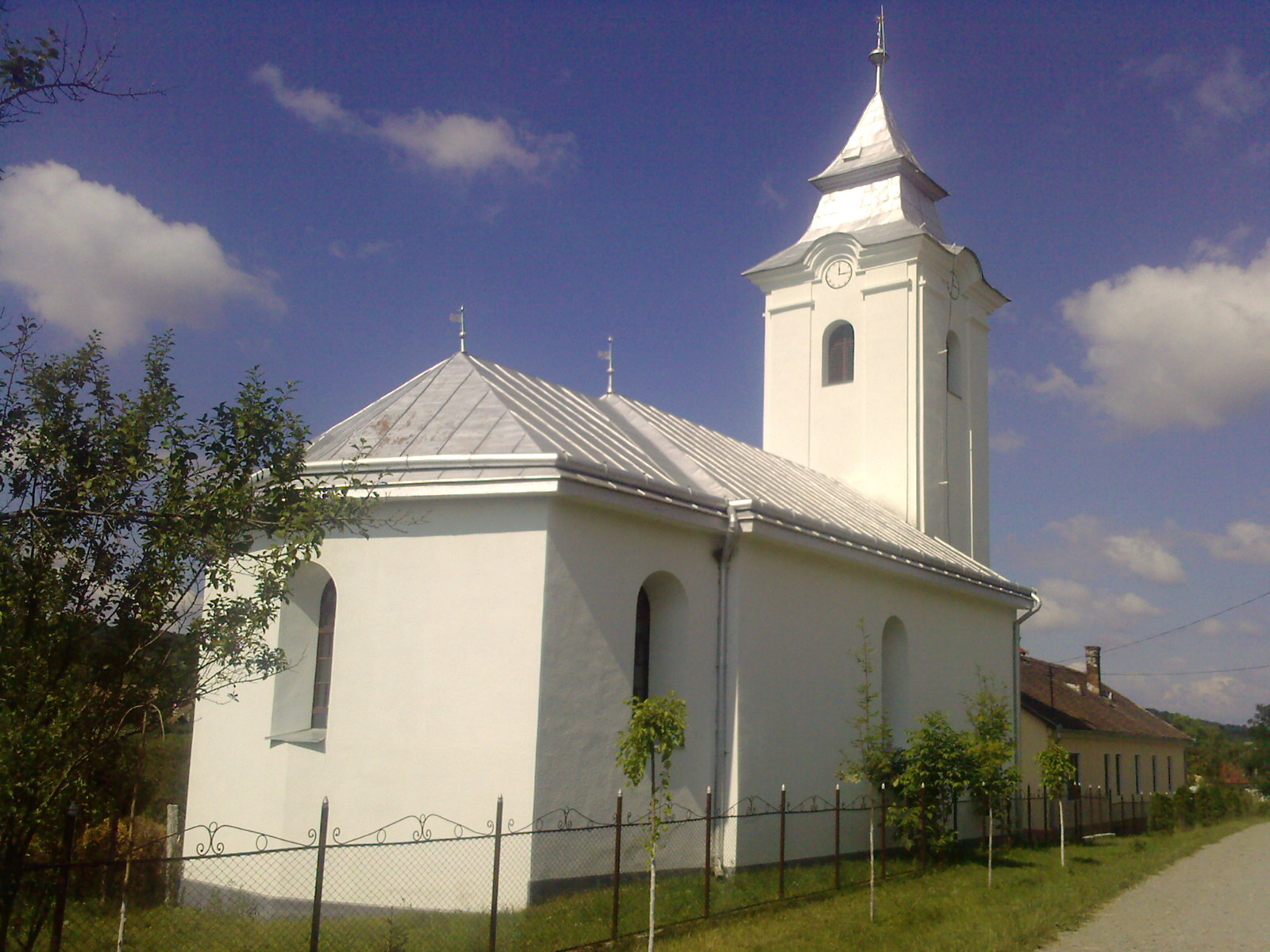
Reformed church (Ratin)
