= Urziceni, Satu Mare =

Urziceni Csanálos, Schinal
- Commune
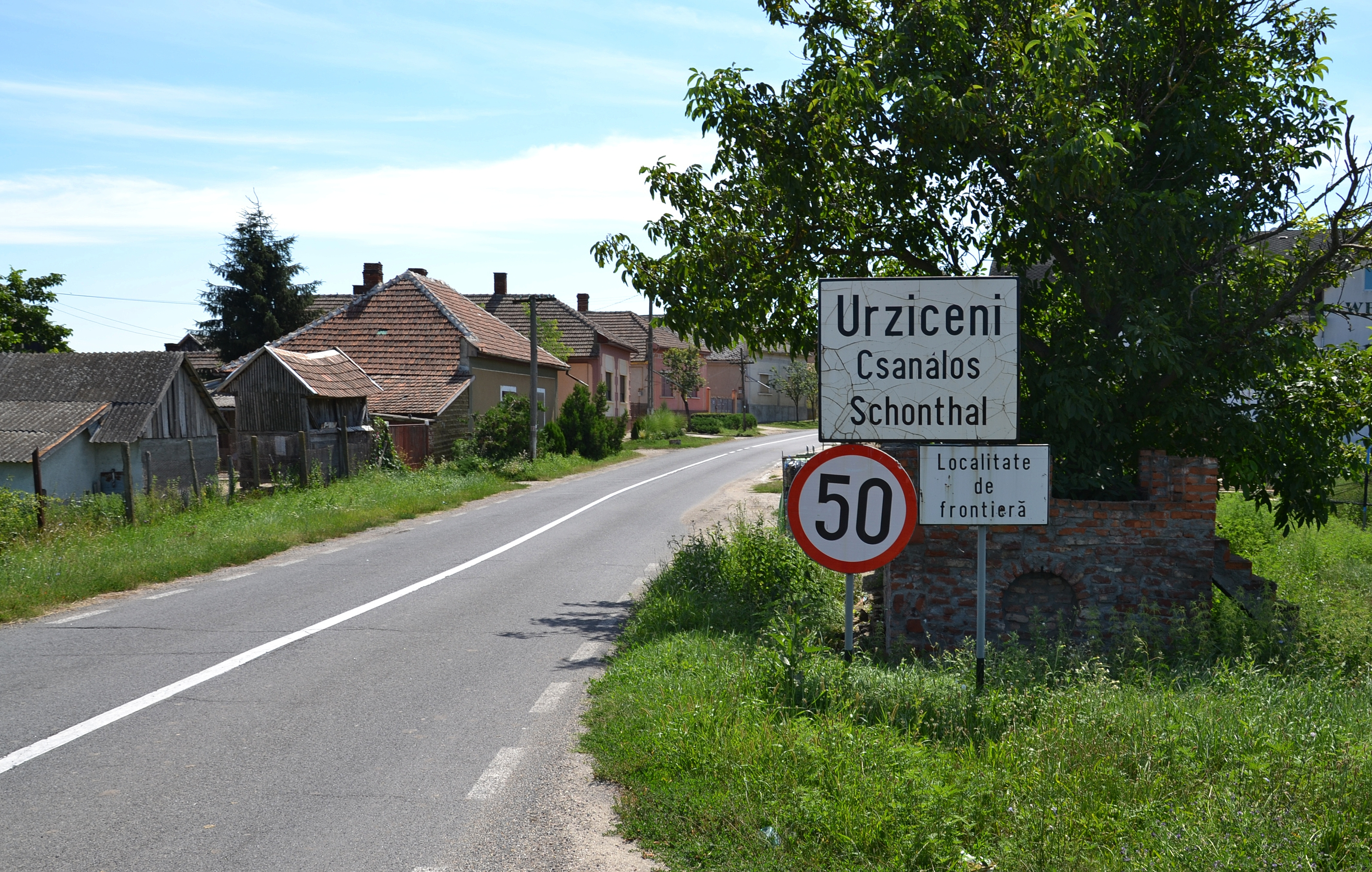
- Commune limit sign

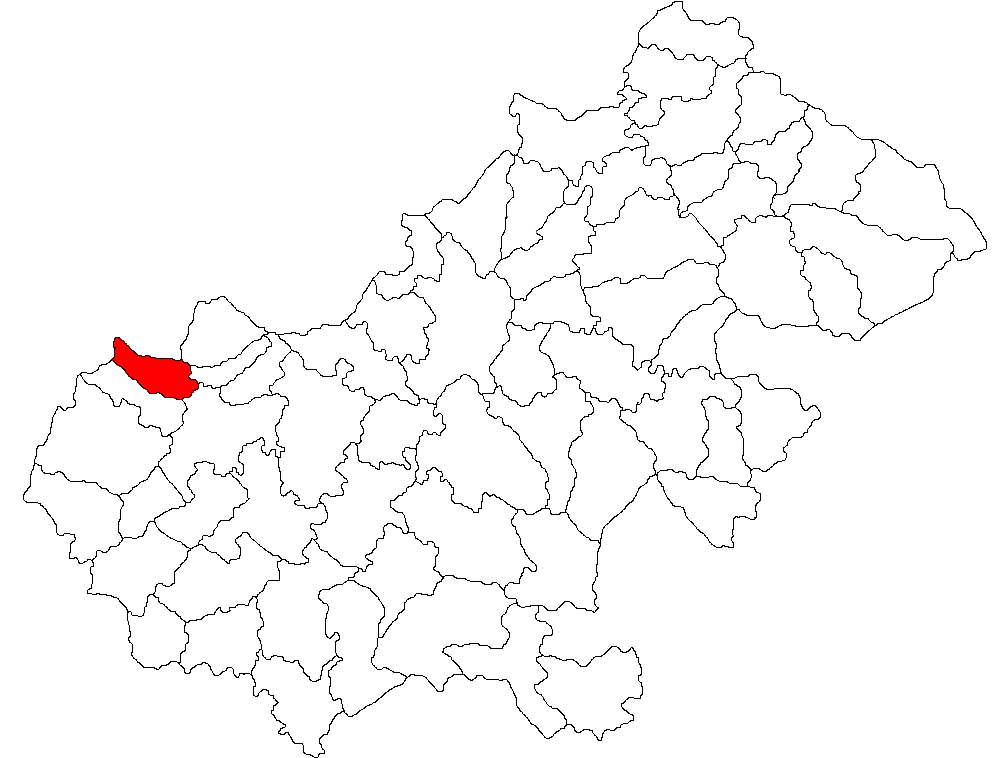
- Location in Satu Mare County

- Location in Romania
- Coordinates: 47°44′N 22°24′E
- Country: Romania
- County: Satu Mare

Government
  - Mayor (2024–2028): Tiberiu Schupler (UDMR)
- Area: 32.3 km^{2} (12.5 sq mi)
- Elevation: 122 m (400 ft)
- Population (2021-12-01): 1,407
  - Density: 43.6/km^{2} (113/sq mi)
- Time zone: UTC+02:00 (EET)
  - Summer (DST): UTC+03:00 (EEST)
- Postal code: 447340
- Area code: (+40) 02 61
- Vehicle reg.: SM
- Website: comunaurziceni.ro

Urziceni (Hungarian: Csanálos, Hungarian pronunciation: [ˈtʃɒnaːloʃ]; German: Schinal or Schönthal) is a commune in Satu Mare County, Romania, right on the Hungarian border. It is composed of two villages, Urziceni and Urziceni-Pădure (Csanáloserdő).

== Administration ==
The current local council has the following political composition, based on the results of the votes cast at the 2024 Romanian local elections.

Party	Seats	Current Council
Democratic Alliance of Hungarians in Romania (UDMR/RMDSZ)	6	
Democratic Forum of Germans in Romania (FDGR/DFDR)	3	

== Geography ==
The commune is located in the western part of the county, at a distance of 8 km (5.0 mi) from Carei and 44 km (27 mi) from the county seat, Satu Mare. The Urziceni Forest (Pădurea Urziceni) is a 40 ha (99 acres) nature reserve located on the territory of the commune.

== Demographics ==
The population was 1,509 in 2002; 68.1% of inhabitants were Hungarians, 22.5% were Germans, and 9.3% were ethnic Romanians. 86.8% were Roman Catholic, 5.6% were Greek-Catholic, 4.2% were Romanian Orthodox, and 3.0% were Reformed. At the 2021 census, the population of Urziceni was 1,407, of which 71.22% were Hungarians, 15.28% were Germans, 8.81% ethnic Romanians, and 1.42% Roma.

Historical population
Year	Pop.	±%
1880	1,162	—
1890	1,201	+3.4%
1900	1,439	+19.8%
1910	1,748	+21.5%
1920	1,790	+2.4%
1930	1,888	+5.5%
1941	1,987	+5.2%
1956	2,076	+4.5%
1966	2,019	−2.7%
1977	1,836	−9.1%
1992	1,607	−12.5%
2002	1,509	−6.1%
2011	1,447	−4.1%
2021	1,407	−2.8%
Source: INS, Census data

== History ==
Historically, the commune was mainly inhabited by Roman Catholic Germans (Danube Swabians) who were brought in by the Hungarian ruler of the land, count Sándor Károlyi, to populate the area that had been deserted as a result of a series of wars and epidemics. The process began in 1711 when the first wave of settlers arrived from present-day Baden-Württemberg, just north of Lake Constance. During the 20th century they gave up the usage of the German language in favour of Hungarian. Since the 1980s, the population has dwindled significantly due to emigration to West Germany, especially before the fall of the communist regime of Nicolae Ceaușescu, but also in the 1990s, mainly for economic reasons.

== Natives ==
- György Nonn (1918 – 2007), Hungarian jurist
- József Tempfli (1931 – 2016), Roman Catholic bishop
