= László Szilágyi (politician) =

Hungarian politician

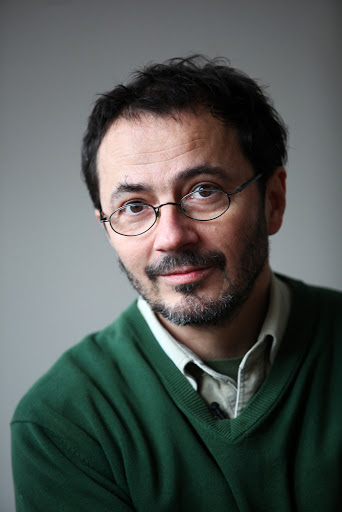

Member of the National Assembly
- In office 14 May 2010 – 5 May 2014

Personal details
- Born: 29 August 1965 (age 60) Nyíregyháza, Hungary
- Party: LMP (2009–2013); PM (2013– )
- Profession: teacher

László Szilágyi (born August 29, 1965) is a Hungarian teacher and politician who served as a member of the National Assembly (MP) from the Politics Can Be Different (LMP) National List from 2010 to 2014.

== Political career ==
Szilágyi was a member of the LMP party between 2009 and 2013. He was elected to the National Assembly from the party's National List during the 2010 Hungarian parliamentary election. He became a member of the Committee on Health May 14, 2010.

In January 2013, the LMP congress rejected the electoral cooperation with other opposition forces, including Together 2014. As a result, members of LMP's “Dialogue for Hungary” platform, including Szilágyi, announced their decision to leave the opposition party and create a new formation, Dialogue for Hungary. LMP member Benedek Jávor stated that the eight MPs leaving the party would keep their parliamentary mandates.
