= Crasna (Tisza) =

Crasna (Kraszna)
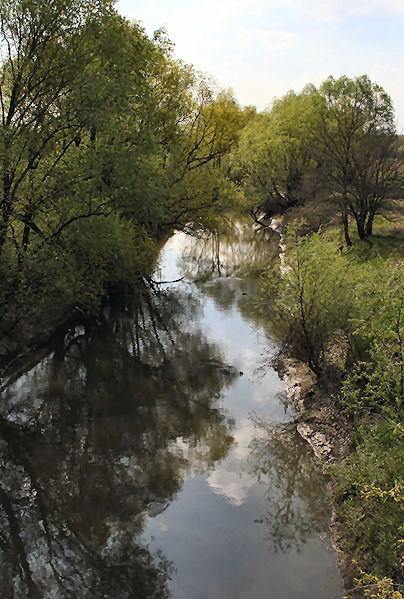
- The Kraszna at Mátészalka in Hungary

- Location within Hungary Location within Romania

Location
- Countries: Romania and Hungary
- Counties: Romania: Sălaj and Satu Mare; Hungary: Szabolcs-Szatmár-Bereg
- Towns: Șimleu Silvaniei; Mátészalka

Physical characteristics
- Mouth: Tisza
  - location: Vásárosnamény
  - coordinates: 48°8′16″N 22°19′8″E
- Length: 193 km (120 mi)
- Basin size: 1,931 km^{2} (746 sq mi)

Basin features
- Progression: Tisza→ Danube→ Black Sea
- Tributaries
  - right: Zalău

The Crasna (Romanian) or Kraszna (Hungarian) is the name of a river in northwestern Romania and northeastern Hungary. The Crasna is a left tributary of the Tisza. Its source is in Transylvania, Romania, near the village of Crasna. It flows through the Romanian counties Sălaj and Satu Mare and the Hungarian county Szabolcs-Szatmár-Bereg. It flows into the Tisza in Vásárosnamény. Cities along the Crasna are Șimleu Silvaniei in Romania, Nagyecsed and Mátészalka in Hungary.

Until the 1890s the Crasna discharged into the river Someș. Since then, the lower course of the Crasna has been regulated and it discharges into the Tisza 3.5 km downstream of the confluence of Tisza and Someș. Its basin size is 1,931 km^{2} (746 sq mi).

== Towns and villages ==
The following towns and villages are situated along the river Crasna, from source to mouth: Cizer, Horoatu Crasnei, Crasna, Vârșolț, Pericei, Șimleu Silvaniei, Măeriște, Sărmășag, Bobota, Supur, Acâș, Craidorolț, Moftin, Berveni (in Romania) and Nagyecsed, Mátészalka and Vásárosnamény (in Hungary).

== Tributaries ==
The following rivers are tributaries to the Crasna:

- Left: Ban, Marin, Mortăuța, Carastelec, Zănicel, Valea Neagră, Horea
- Right: Valea Boului, Pria, Ponița, Colițca, Zalău, Maja, Cerna, Maria, Tăul Terebești
