= Agrij (river) =

River in Sălaj, Romania

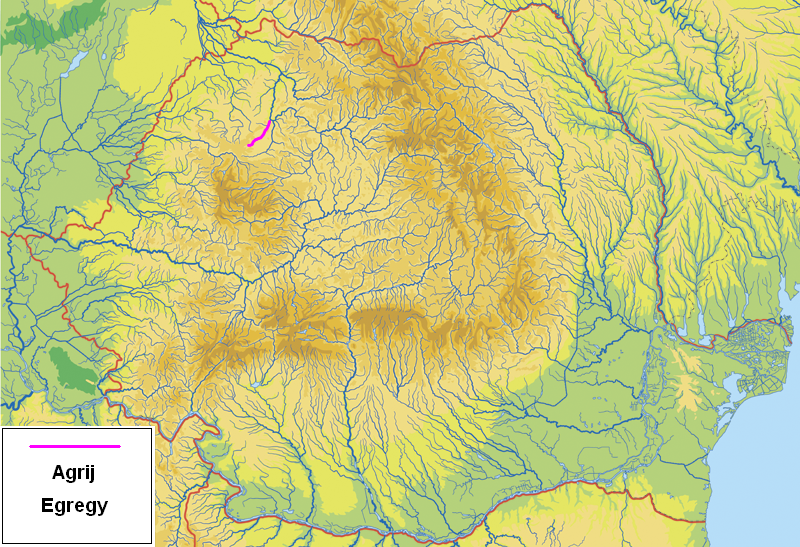

Location
- Country: Romania
- Counties: Sălaj County
- Villages: Bogdana, Agrij, Românași, Creaca

Physical characteristics
- Mouth: Someș
  - location: Jibou
  - coordinates: 47.2567°N 23.2748°E
- Length: 48 km (30 mi)
- Basin size: 382 km^{2} (147 sq mi)

Basin features
- Progression: Someș→ Tisza→ Danube→ Black Sea
- Tributaries
  - left: Treznea, Ortelec
  - right: Răstolț

The Agrij (Hungarian: Egregy-patak) is a left tributary of the river Someș in Romania. It flows through the communes Buciumi, Agrij, Românași, Creaca and Jibou. It discharges into the Someș in Jibou. Its length is 48 km (30 mi) and its basin size is 382 km^{2} (147 sq mi).
