= Battle of Zalău =

Military action in 1919 in the Hungarian–Romanian War

- Part of Hungarian–Romanian War
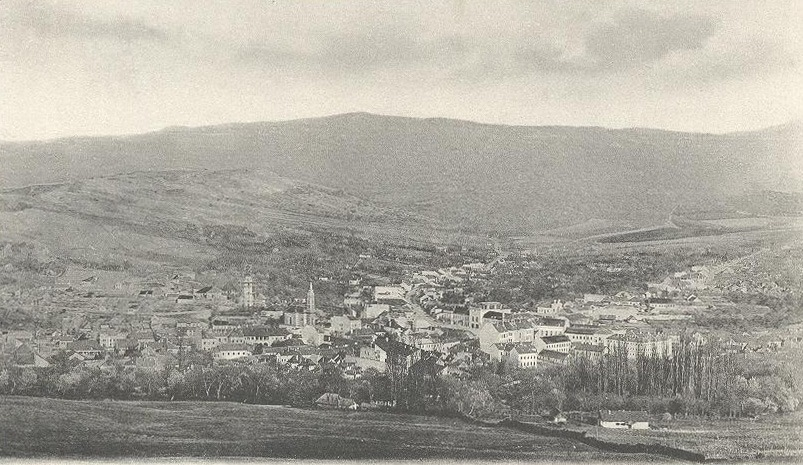
- Zalău in 1903
Date	23–26 February 1919
Location	Zalău, Romania
Result	Inconclusive

Belligerents
Kingdom of Hungary	Romania

Commanders and leaders
Mihály Gyurotsik	Alexandru Calmuschi

Casualties and losses
Unknown	15 killed and wounded

The Battle of Zalău was a tactical-level military engagement that took place from February 23rd to 26th, 1919, in the area of the town of Zalău in Szilágy County (now Sălaj County). The conflict involved Hungarian troops from the Székely Division attacking Romanians from the 13th Infantry Brigade. This battle was part of the broader military operations defending the Great Union during the Romanian Army's efforts to occupy the demarcation line in Transylvania during the Hungarian–Romanian War. The outcome was favorable to the Romanian troops, whom after initially having to leave the town, managed to regain control.

Representing a gateway of real strategic importance for both armies, the city of Zalău was a key Hungarian outpost. It served as a center for armed resistance and a possible base for an offensive aimed at restoring the Hungary's old borders. The Romanian Army's takeover of Zalău was preceded by various incidents, and complicated by the challenging situation of the civilian population. This occurred in the context of the existing revolutionary climate and the transition of Transylvania to a new administration.

The establishment of the balance of power along the new military demarcation line, set in January 1919, led each side to devise plans to gain additional military advantages beyond the existing situation on the ground. The Romanian command aimed to create a 10 km (6.2 mi) neutral zone by forcing Hungarian troops to withdraw further. Meanwhile, the Hungarian command planned to regain the Zalău–Jibou area.

However, several factors, destabilized the plans of both commands. Central to this destabilization was the difficult context faced by the Hungarian ethnicity civilian population in the area, from which a significant percentage of soldiers and officers of the Hungarian military subunits were drawn. Additionally, one of the Hungarian battalions near Zalău was commanded by Major Mihály Gyurotsik, whose family was immobilized in the city under Romanian troops.

Without an order from his superiors in the Székely Division and without considering the need for superiority of the effectives, adequate technical equipment, and sufficient post-attack supplies, Major Gyurotsik initiated an action on February 23rd, 1919. This led to the initial conquest of Zalău by Hungarian troops and the withdrawal of the Romanian forces to the neighboring areas. However, due to the technical, organizational, and numerical superiority of the Romanian troops, the Hungarians could not consolidate their gains, and the city was regained by the Romanians on February 26th. Romanian artillery played a significant role in this, although it caused considerable destruction to the locality, which was later exploited by Hungarian propaganda.

From a military standpoint, the events in Zalău inflicted significant material and reputational damage on the Romanian troops. However, the wide range of problems—caused both immediately and subsequently for the rest of the civilian population of Zalău and the city itself—meant that given the Hungarian troops' inability to maintain their military gains, the overall outcome was negative for the Hungarian Republican Army.

== The geographical, military and political context ==
Military map from 1894 of the Zalău area

Crossing the second alignment of the demarcation line, after securing Cluj, the Romanian armed forces continued to slowly press forward. The French general Louis Franchet d'Espèrey appreciated that, in the context in which the final goal of the Romanians was to occupy territories in accordance with those recorded in the secret treaty from Bucharest, a Romanian-Hungarian war was imminent. Although no open conflict has yet been reached as an effect of the fact that, on January 21, 1919, d'Esperey ordered the Romanian military advance to stop, on January 23, however, the Hungarian Council of Ministers decided, for the first time, that it had no other solution than armed resistance. A new order from January 28 of the French Prime Minister Georges Clemenceau determined the fixation of the Romanian armies on the new alignment, which, in Sălaj county and at the level of its border with nearby counties, passed around the edge of the localities Băsești – Chilioara – Crișeni – Panic – Aghireș – Șeredei – Pria – Ciucea. On the Romanian side, the winter of 1918–1919 was used to lay the foundations for the establishment of the 16th and 18th divisions (made up of former soldiers of the Austro-Hungarian Army) and for the more thorough organization of the other Romanian divisions, as well as for training and equipping the troops. On the Hungarian side, however, no significant progress was made in the field of military organization. The only tangible results were represented by those of the Székely Division which, despite serious financial and disciplinary problems, had nevertheless constituted troops capable of opposing the Romanian advance.

Considered a "gate" of real strategic importance that was to be "defended from adversaries with desperation", the town of Zalău constituted a real challenge regarding the takeover of the city by the Romanian troops and the Romanian administration. The city was considered a Hungarian center that had everything it needed to develop in this spirit, and as such, there was a favorable framework for a center to be established here with the character of an outpost of both the Hungarian armed resistance and the Hungarian republican military formations determined to continue the offensive with the aim of restoring the old borders of Hungary.

== Prelude ==
=== Situation of the civilian population ===
In the week that followed the Țigani clash (in today's Crișeni) of January 14, 1919, five of the notables of the locality and the county were arrested and taken to Dej, the rumors from the local level crediting the idea that they will be referred to a military tribunal.^{[A]}

According to what was stated by the local newspaper Szilágyság, the Romanian population of the villages around Zalău — under the influence of Bolshevik ideas and encouraged by the presence of troops from the Kingdom — began to loot the shops of the town and the contents of the cellars of the local vineyards. There was also an incident in this context resulting in three victims, including the retired headmaster of the town's elementary school. According to Hungarian historian Miklós Szentpály-Juhász, there was threatening behavior from drunken people and rapes. The same historian mentioned that, according to the documents of the Hungarian Military Command from Transylvania, there was also the active participation of some of the Romanian soldiers of the regiments in the city in these acts.

According to the documents of the Romanian troops, the local Romanian Military Command collaborated with the local police and managed through energetic measures to temper the recalcitrant masses. Harsh measures were taken by the Romanian military administration to curb the various disturbances.

...On the other hand the Romanian military command will take the harshest measures against the perpetrators, regardless of nationality...

— Except from an order issued by Major Gheorghe Rozin, commander of the Romanian troops in Zalău

Through three successive ordinances signed by Major Gheorghe Rozin^{[C]} (the local commander in Zalău) the movement of citizens after 11p.m. starting on January 19, 1919, was prohibited, shops were ordered to open and public gatherings in groups were prohibited larger than three people, as well as handing over any weaponry and military material to the Romanian troops within 24 hours. Also, the population was forbidden to leave the villages without the written authorization of the mayor. Failure to comply was to be punished under martial law. Those who were to be caught looting or caught "in other evil deeds" were to be "arrested, threatened, tried, and possibly even punished with death".

Towards the end of January, the situation normalized, although some problems continued to exist, as well as other crimes against public or private property. Also, between January and February, detachments of the "Division 7 Infantry" undertook actions to disarm the localities in their sector of competence.

All the more so as among the Hungarian soldiers of the battalion led by Major Gyurotsik there were some (among whom Gyurotsik himself was) who had family members in the Zalău area and as such they had been subjected to direct threats ,^{[D]} the news about the situation in which the civilian population of Zalău had been put in the period following the occupation of the locality by the Romanian troops contributed to the destabilization of the military situation, testing the psyche of the Hungarian soldiers beyond the line of demarcation.^{[E]} In that context, the deterioration of the situation came with the ultimatum later delivered by the Romanian troops to the Hungarians.

== The ultimatum ==
The middle of February 1919 was relatively calm in the territory bordering the Romanian zone of the demarcation line, although along it, there were constant vigorous skirmishes by patrols which were answered with artillery fire.

On February 20, 1918, from the Romanian command of the 7th Infantry Division came the express request that the Hungarian troops withdraw ten kilometers behind the demarcation line, thus leaving a neutral zone between them and the respective alignment. In the transmitted document, clarifications were also made regarding what could happen if this withdrawal had not been carried out, namely: it would have followed that the Romanian troops moved beyond the demarcation line to protect the Romanian localities, as well as with the aim avoiding possible incidents that could have taken place between the Romanian National Guards and the Hungarian military. In that request, which had a 24-hour response deadline, retaliatory measures were specified against the families of Hungarian officers (including that of Major Gyurotsik). The answer colonel Károly Kratochvil — at the head of the Hungarian Command of the Transylvanian Military District and commander of the Székely Division — was negative, claiming that the only valid demarcation line is the one established by the Armistice of Belgrade. As a result, from his point of view, those who would have followed to withdraw were only the Romanians. He also specified that, if his troops or the civilian population are attacked, the Hungarian soldiers will defend themselves and the responsibility for what happens next will fall to the Romanians. In the same context, Kratochvil informed the Hungarian government about the exchange of notes and ordered the reading of the Romanian ultimatum and the Hungarian response offered to it.

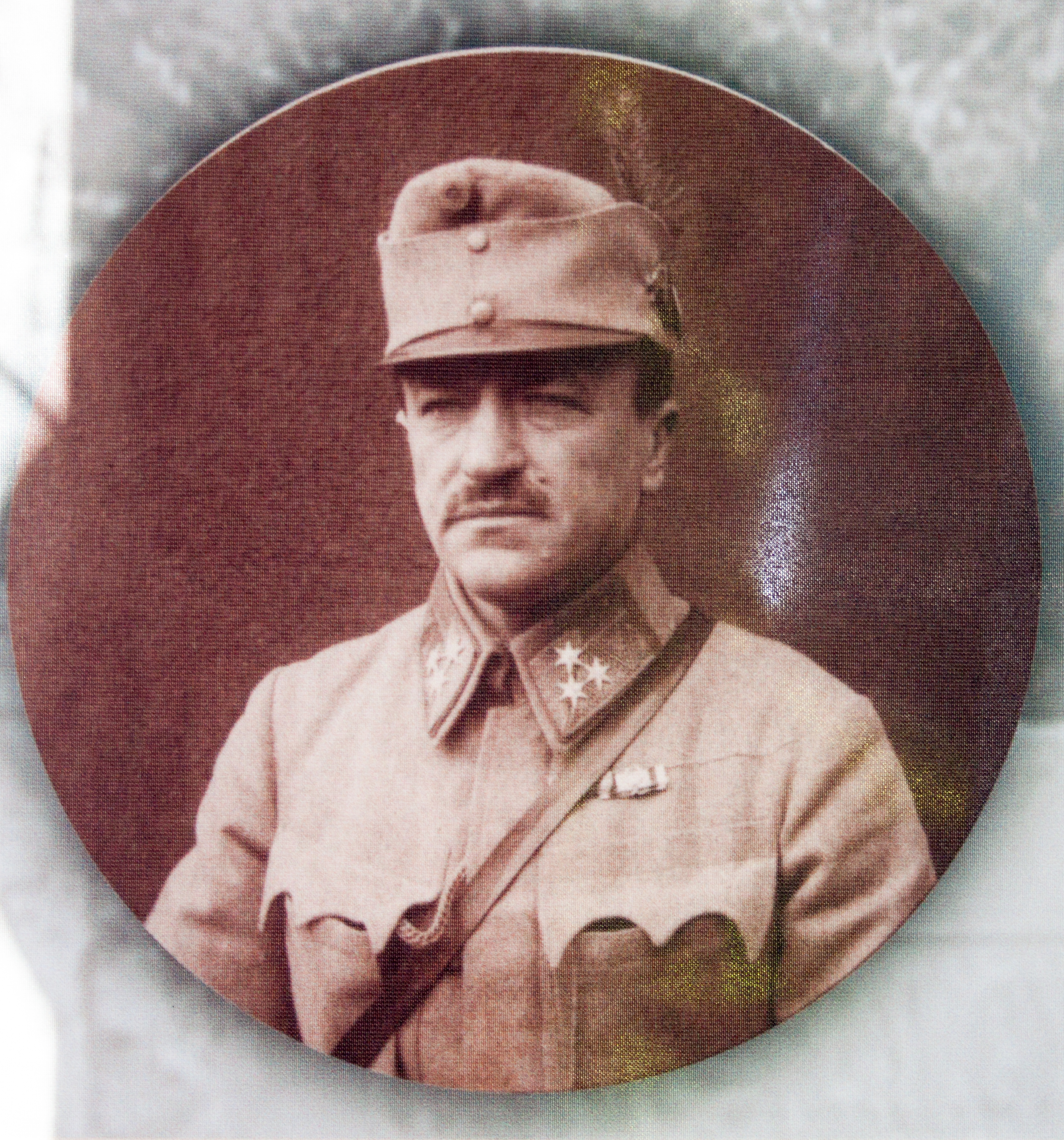
At the command of Colonel Károly Kratochvil, steps were taken for the preventive development of an action plan

At the same time, the Hungarian Command of the Transylvanian Military District ordered the General Staff of the Székely Division, through the prism of the Belgrade Military Convention, to set up a plan to recapture the localities of Zalău and Jibou.

== Initial Action Plan ==
On February 23, a plan was proposed by colonels Nagy Pál and Franz Schuppler, without a precise date of its entry into action. In their opinion, the recapture of the localities was not possible without launching a military action which should have been a surprise attack. The two specified that the battles fought until that moment showed that the resistance that the Romanian troops could oppose was not significant, and the use of strong attack forces could lead to quick results. Also, it was necessary that the occupation of Zalău and Jibou be done at the same time so that the Romanians could not bring reinforcements. The plan estimated the number of Romanian regular troops in the Benesat – Jibou – Zalău area at 2,000 men, to whom were associated many fighters from the "Romanian National Guards", considered opponents more difficult to defeat. The estimate assessed that the Romanians had at their disposal 16 guns, as well as a number of machine guns.

At that time, the 1st Battalion of the 12th Honvéd Infantry Regiment was stationed in the direction of Zalău, supported by an artillery battery, which was to be added to close the access to the city. The 2nd Battalion of the 24th Honvéd Infantry Regiment was commanded by Major Mihály Gyurotsik. The occupation of the villages of Crișeni and Mirșid would have deprived the Romanian troops from Zalău of the railway connection, which would have determined their withdrawal without a fight. According to the two authors of the plan, if the Romanian Army had subsequently wanted to hold the city as a strategic point (according to those established in Belgrade), the Romanians would have been forced to negotiate the power and behavior of the occupying troops in accordance with Hungarian interests.

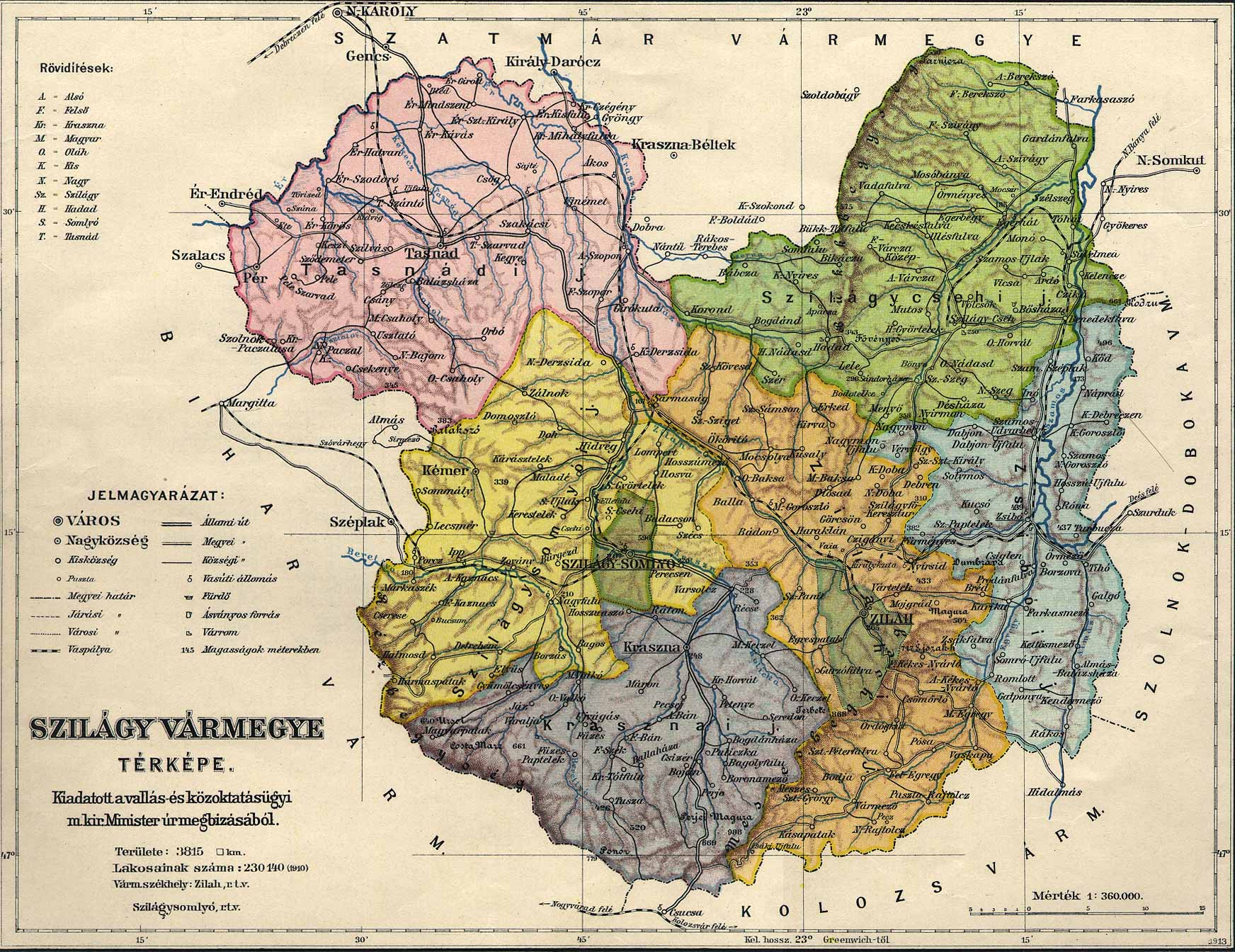
Administrative map from 1910 of Szilágy County, on which directions can be noted of action, as well as communication channels.

The occupation of Jibou was expected to be more difficult. Being a day's march from the city, the troops of the 32 Honvéd Infantry Regiment should have pushed forward secretly on the Sălaj River valley to shorten the time of their entry into action, so that the Romanians cannot bring reinforcements. The attack would have been carried out in two columns, one of which would move along the Sărmășag – Jibou railway and the second in the direction of Nadișu Hododului – Chilioara – Sâncraiu Silvaniei – Șoimuș. This last column would have been covered by a detachment coming in the direction of Cehu Silvaniei – Benesat. In order to ensure the operation from Zalău from Ortelec and Creaca, another detachment had to be deployed. Also, a trailer would have followed to provide the necessary support for the repair of the railway. Three battalions of infantry and two artillery batteries should have participated in the planned action at Jibou, these being supported by another 1-2 battalions. In this sense, the troops had to be part of the 32nd Honvéd Infantry Regiment, as well as the 1st and 2nd Independent Battalions of the 1st Szekler Regiment (Group).

The authors of the project recommended adequate preparation in advance, because Zalău was an important strategic point that the Romanians would not have given up easily and a counterattack by the Romanian troops would probably have been the consequence. However, the technical equipment existing at that time did not allow a war of maneuver. Equipping with equipment, supplying ammunition and ensuring the artillery's collaboration would have been prerequisites for the success of the operation that should not have been launched - especially the one at Jibou, until the supply of means was completed. Also, the attacking troops could not have relied on the horses and the food they would have found in the attacked territory, the resupply was to be done mostly in Zalău and Jibou by rail. As the dependence on a single source of supply was not reliable and the number of troops available was insufficient, the gendarmerie and the "Hungarian National Guards" should have additionally ensured the supply, in addition to protecting the railway and disarming the hostile population. Also, at Tășnad, the weapons intended to be distributed to the Hungarian population that would come to support the attacking troops had already been brought.

The authors of the plan stated at the end that the situation was constantly changing, so that a concrete plan could only be put in place before action. They also specified that the Zalău attack could become redundant in a few days, which put the whole plan in question. They, of course, knew that the members of the Hungarian National Guard and the officers of the 2nd Battalion of the 24th Honvéd Infantry Regiment - who would later participate in the planned action - had, for the most part, members of their families, residents in the Zalău area.

== Disposition of troops ==
=== Romanian troops ===
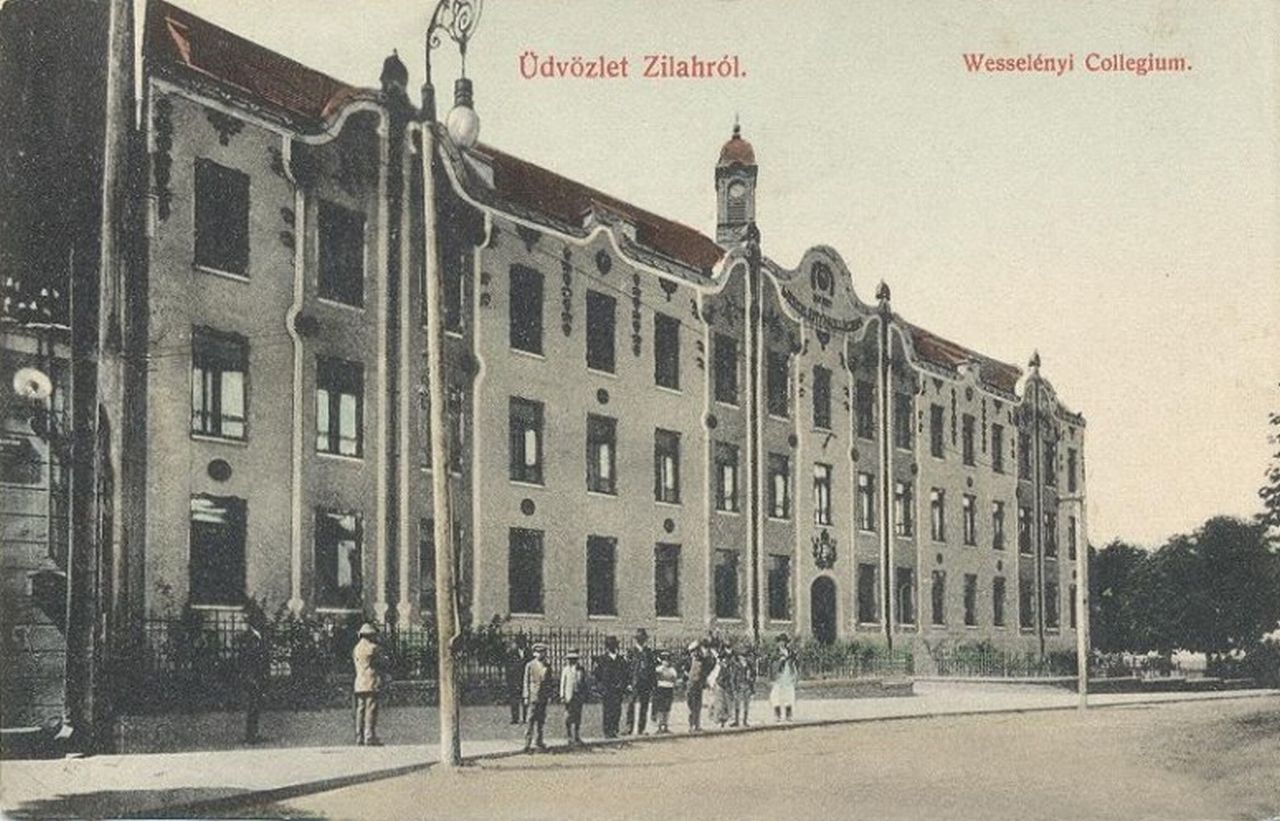
The building of the Wesselényi Reformed College in Zalău in 1910 (currently the Silvania National College), where the Romanian soldiers were quartered.

Following the armed incident at Țigani, on January 2/15, 1919, Romanian soldiers entered Zalău. To avoid another attack, they came from Ortelec on foot and not by rail.

In the last part of February 1919, the 1st and 3rd Battalions of the 15th Infantry Regiment were deployed to the positions of Zalău and Țigani (Crișeni) warriors. A second battalion was in Zalău.(in Hungarian) A zilahi eset ..., Miklós, 2003, Csatában térkép At Mirșid was the ``2nd Battalion of the 15th Infantry Regiment "Warriors" and at Jibou the Battalion 3 from 27th Infantry Regiment "Bacău".(in Hungarian) A zilahi eset ..., Miklós, 2003, Gyurotsik Mihály tászási terve Zilah megszállására 1919. February 22. The infantry subunits were supported by artillery, respectively by 2 batteries from the 1st Division of 2nd Artillery Regiment located in Zalău.

== Hungarian troops ==
After the withdrawal of Hungarian troops from the administrative center of Sălaj, the Hungarian government disbanded the battalion that had garrisoned the town. Along with Major Gyurotsik, a total of 50 soldiers and 9 officers with 2 machine guns chose to retreat with the Hungarian troops, to join the 32 Honvéd Infantry Regiment. This group was joined by other recruits and together, they were directed on the railway to Debrecen. Here, the Chief of Staff of the Szekler Division, Colonel Kálmán Szakall, decided to deploy the group to Nușfalău, with the order to ensure the connection with the Szekler troops of the Regiment 21 Honvéd Infantry located at Ciucea and with those located towards Baia Mare. Gyurotsik was also ordered to recruit soldiers so that his subunit would reach the strength of a battalion, as well as to supervise the activity of the Romanians in Șimleu Silvaniei through a detachment of riflemen.

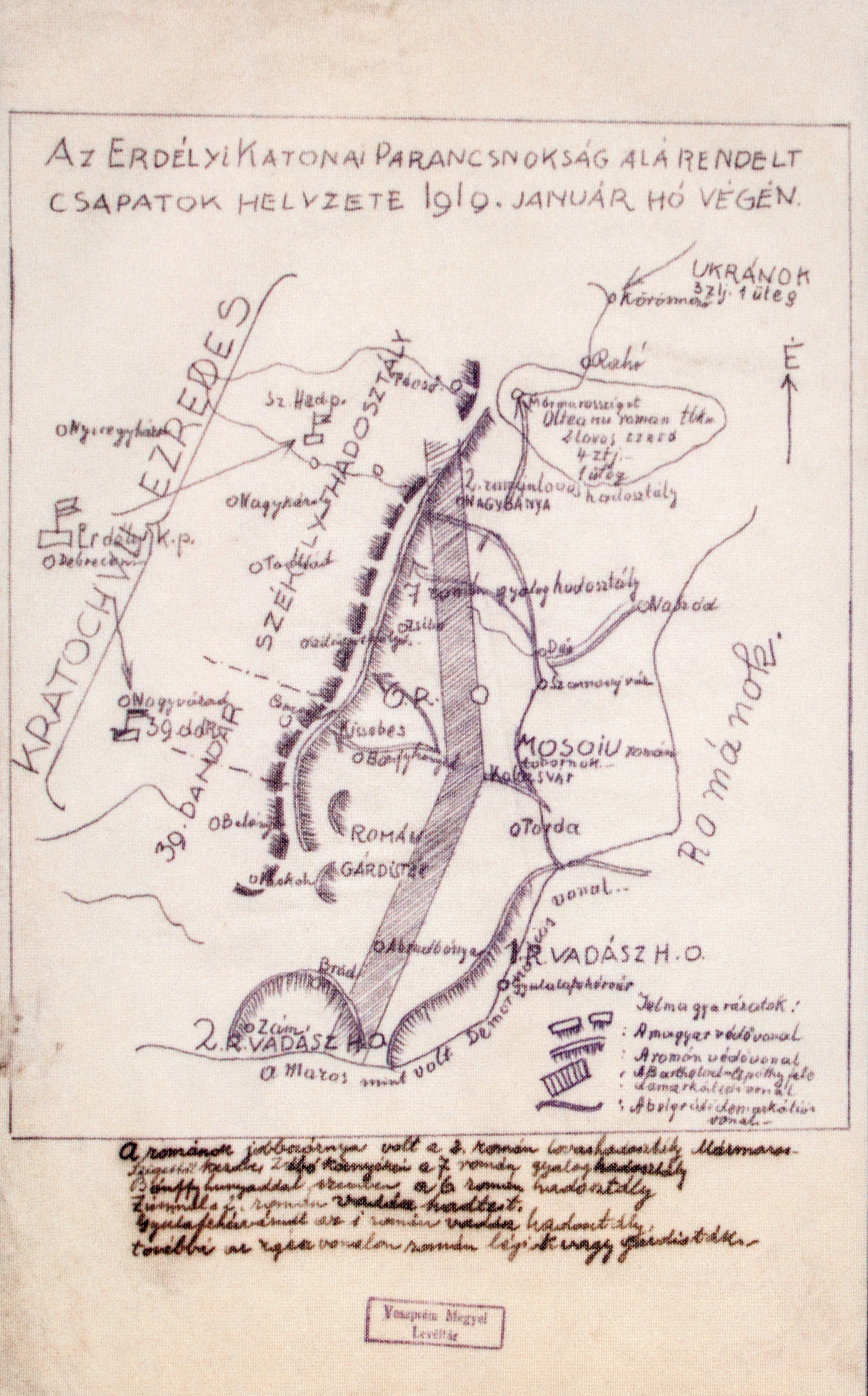
The military situation at the level of the demarcation line.

Arriving on January 18 in Nușfalău, the "Gyurotsik Detachment" was joined by returned former Hungarian prisoners from Russia and members of the Hungarian National Guards from Crasna, initially forming three companies. A machine gun group (initially with four machine guns) and a cavalry unit of twenty fighters were also established. The detachment's weak point was discipline, and its members wanted to go into battle with the Romanians, although they lacked proper training and adequate equipment.

The subunit later established its headquarters at Vârșolț, having outposts at Hereclean (1 rifle company with 1 machine gun section), Panic (1 rifle company with 1 machine gun section) and at Recea (1 rifle company with 1 machine gun section). On average, there were 100 riflemen with 2 machine guns in the respective centers. A new company was formed from recruits from Vârșolț and Crasna, in Vârșolț forming the battalion's reserve (1 rifle company with 1 machine gun section and a cavalry detachment with a force of 20 horsemen). The "Gyurotsik Detachment" received the designation 2nd Battalion and was operationally subordinated to the 24th Honvéd Infantry Regiment from Șimleu Silvaniei, a unit under the command of Lieutenant-Colonel Ferenc Schuppler.

The 1st Battalion of the 12th Honvéd Infantry Regiment was at Crasna at the time of the attack launched by Gyurotsik. The artillery, represented by 2 batteries, was in Vârșolț.

=== The actual plan of attack ===
The balance of forces was clearly unfavorable to the attackers. They had a force of 400 men equipped with 8 machine guns, divided into four groups of 100 men and 2 machine guns each and supported by two artillery batteries of 4 howitzers of 100 mm. On the other side, there were initially 4 Romanian infantry battalions supported by 3 artillery batteries. However, Gyurotsik relied on the effect of surprise, on the desperation of his men, as well as on their fighting spirit. According to his plan, the column that was supposed to start from Hereclean on the left wing was to move towards Crișeni, to occupy the northern foothills of the Meseș Mountains, which the city of Zalău dominates. The group from Panic was supposed to attack towards Zalău, after conquering it, taking a position at the foot of the Meseș mountains. On the right wing, the column from Recea was to reach Zalău via Aghireș, with the same mission as the one from Panic. The reserve group was to wait at Hereclean for the order to move via Gârceiu and Mirșid towards Jibou, with the order to bear the counterattack of the Romanian troops as well as to secure Zalău. The main battles were to take place in the Mirșid-Jibou direction and as such to be near the critical area, Gyurotsik was to command the battle from Hereclean. The officer estimated that the Romanian troops in Zalău could be outclassed if his battalion concentrated on the first attack. Consequently, he asked the 1st Battalion from the 12th Honvéd Regiment, located in Crasna, to enter the battle by moving through Mirsid towards Jibou, in case Zalău was conquered.

Comparing both plans, that of Gyurotsik and the one made by the command of the Székely Division, it stands out that the invasion of Jibo would have been allowed only by a particularly fortunate circumstance and that there was no real chance to this city would be preserved. In addition Gyurotsik was going to rely on a band in full reorganization and with discipline problems, which belonged to a subunit that was initially disbanded and then re-established.

== The Battle ==
After, at 6 p.m. on February 22, 1919, the attack groups occupied their starting positions in Hereclean, Panic, and Recea, and the reserve troops were positioned at Hereclean, at 6:30 p.m. the attack was started on the entire line and Gyurotsik announced the launch of the Székely Division command. But, due to the large distances and poorly organized reporting services, the major could no longer exert a significant influence on the ongoing events (the troops that advanced did not report their situation, and the messengers sent after the respective detachments simply did not they came back again).

At 19:00, in Țigani (Crișeni), the Hungarian soldiers came into contact with the soldiers of the 3rd Battalion from the 15th Infantry Regiment, who retreated hastily and disorderly, together with their own artillery from the Regiment 4 Artillery, towards Gârceiu. Although victorious, the Hungarian soldiers (who should have occupied the northern foothills of the Meseș Mountains) gradually trickled towards Zalău.

At 19:30 the commander of the subunit that was supposed to advance towards Mirsid, being seriously injured in the hand by a grenade, returned to Hereclean, where he died. Left without him, most of the soldiers of the subunit stopped. Later, since they did not encounter any enemy troops until the dawn of February 23, they also returned to Hereclean, where Major Gyurotsik was organizing the reserves for the defense of the main position, which was essential for the maintenance of Zalău. Being, however, on the way to Mirșid, a small detachment of Hungarian soldiers got lost and fell into the captivity of the Romanian troops.

The column that started from Panic crossed the Romanian lines fragmented in the dark and only part of its soldiers reached Zalău at dawn. In the south, the column starting from Recea fragmented in three directions: the left wing ^{[F]} advanced towards Zalău and then towards the ridge of the mountain; the ^{[G]} center passed through Aghireș, putting the Romanian soldiers from here to flight after a short battle. From Aghireș a detachment ^{[H]} went to clean Meseșenii de Sus. After that, the detachment continued its movement towards the south of the city of Zalău, at one point attacking with bayonets a group of Romanian soldiers.

The hall was found almost empty by the Romanian troops ^{[I]} of the "1st Battalion" of the "15th Infantry Regiment" and the "1st Division" from the "2nd Artillery Regiment", (retired in the meantime to Ortelec, without trying to resist and without taking countermeasures), with only a few detachments remaining in the city delayed. The troops from Recea found a small Romanian detachment in the town's train station that tried to save the war material, but after a short fight the train station was occupied. The commander of the Hungarian detachment sent part of the troop to the slopes of Meseș and raised the Hungarian flag on the tower of the Reformed Church. As a result of the attack, 7 Romanian officers, a military priest and 40 soldiers were taken prisoners, who were taken to Vârșolț. Later Ioan Partenie, the military priest of the 15th Infantry Regiment, would recount his experience as a prisoner. The losses of the Hungarian troops were 27 dead (including 5 officers) and 41 wounded.

According to Partenie, amid the inter-ethnic tension in the area, the prisoners were subjected to humiliation, the officers being beaten and threatened with death by the refugee Hungarian civilian population and members of the Hungarian irregular troops.

All this time, Major Gyurotsik was in limbo, only on February 23 at 9 o'clock in the morning after the fog had lifted, could he see the flag raised in the tower of the place of worship. Since, after the death of the officer in charge of the detachment that was supposed to reach Mirsid, there was no one to replace him, Gyurotsik had to stay to organize the reserve troops from Hereclean in the defense of that point, crucial to be able to be preserved the locality of Zalău.

During the days when the Hungarian troops were in the city, proclamations were displayed calling on the civilian population to resist the Romanian authorities and arms were distributed to the ethnic Hungarian population, whose members actively supported the attack.

Although Zalău had been occupied, still as a result of the failure of the detachment that was supposed to reach Mirșid and the lack of troops occupying the spine of the Meseș Mountains (out of the three detachments intended for this purpose only the one under the command of Lieutenant Árpád Kovácsy had successfully completed its mission), the result was doubtful, given the lack of achievement of the main objective of the attack. In the city the Hungarian soldiers were not watched by their commanders, being allowed to see their families and to be welcomed with joy and casks of wine by their countrymen. No one organized them to complete the action.

=== Counterattack ===
On February 24, the Romanian military sent parliamentarians to Zalău, at the same time taking note of the weakness of the Hungarian forces, as well as of the existing conditions in the locality. Also, on the same day, they managed to restore the front line interrupted at Gârceiu and on the slopes of the Meseș Mountains, near Ortelec. Thus, the wings of the 2nd Battalion from the 15th Infantry Regiment, located in Mirșid and the 3rd Battalion from the 27th Infantry Regiment, located in Jibou - were extended. The Romanian parliamentarians requested the immediate evacuation of the city and the unconditional release of the prisoners taken by the Hungarians, the commander of the 15th Infantry Regiment also setting a deadline for this. Lieutenant Árpád Kovácsy replied that he agreed with the cessation of hostilities, but he set unacceptable conditions from the point of view of the Romanians (requesting a stop to the bombing of the city, otherwise going to executed the Romanian notables and the Romanian soldiers taken prisoner) and refused to leave the town.

After the deadline expired, several weak attacks by the Romanians were repelled by the Hungarians in the station area, they resisted around noon at Țigani (Crișeni), and around 4 p.m. at Hereclean, where the afternoon arrived to reinforce the Hungarian troops a company sent by the 32 Honvéd Infantry Regiment, under the leadership of Captain János Csíky.

Once the situation had stabilized during the night, Gyurotsik handed over command at Hereclean to Csíky and concentrated on his own battalion. He received confirmation from Vârșolț that the message he sent to the division command regarding the attack had reached the right place, but also the news that the command of the action from Zalău had been taken from him, so that it would be entrusted to the commander of the 1st Battalion from 12th Honvéd Infantry Regiment. Gyurotsik's new mission was to protect Hereclean.

The addition of the new subunit to the action did not improve the situation much, because from Meseș the Romanian artillery began to hit the city, to force the withdrawal of the Hungarian troops. In the locality panic set in and along with many of the inhabitants of Zalău, some of the soldiers fled. The only organized force that remained was Lieutenant Kovácsy's subunit. Still not feeling strong enough to attack, the Romanian troops continued the artillery fire, during which they received as reinforcements the 1st Battalion from the 16th Infantry Regiment (brought from Baia Mare), 2 from the 27 Infantry Regiment (brought from Jibou)

On February 24, the command of the Székely Division deployed the 1st Battalion of the 24th Honvéd Infantry Regiment to Zalău, under the command of Major Barabas Gero. On February 25, at 8 o'clock, Lieutenant Kovácsy's company was attacked in the area of the station by clearly superior Romanian forces, estimated by him at several battalions, which is why the subunit gradually retreated and in the afternoon returned to its departure position. The troops of the 1st Battalion from the 24th Honvéd Regiment maintained their position during the day, being withdrawn to the hills in the western vicinity of the city only on February 26, as a result of the intense bombardment and their attack by superior forces. The difficulty of conquering the locality by the Romanian Army was increased, however, by the fact that part of its ethnic Hungarian population made an active contribution to the defense.

== Consequences ==
Regarding the balance sheet of the action initiated by Gyurotsik, we must put, on the one hand, the material and image damage caused to the Romanian troops, along with the fact that, finally, the families of the Hungarian officers threatened by the Romanian command with retaliatory measures - involved in the appearance of the motivation of the action - they escaped, and, on the other hand, the entire level of problems generated at the moment, or as a later effect, for the rest of the civilian population of Zalău and the city itself. However, the military result of the action of the Hungarian troops was provisional and could not be maintained, which, according to the statements of Colonel Kratochvil, made the final balance of the action a negative one.

== On civilian population and buildings ==
The fighting for Zalău caused suffering for the population. A large number of refugees appeared among the Hungarians in the city, withdrawn for fear of reprisals and point towards the area under the control of the Székely Division, beyond the demarcation line. These refugees returned in a few months. The former central administrative headquarters of Sălaj County, current headquarters of the Zalău City Hall. The prefect notes that almost all the windows of the building are broken and the building is bombarded by projectiles, so only six rooms are habitable... April 25, 1919 drawn up by Gheorghe Pop de Oarța, on the occasion of taking over as prefect, the headquarters of the county administration. According to Constantin Kirițescu, Zalău suffered a lot from Romanian artillery fire. This firing caused damage to the civilian population, according to the Hungarian historian Miklós Szentpály-Juhász, this damage being "very large". Both direct fighting and artillery fire caused damage to buildings. In the opinion of the Romanian historian Cornel Grad, the respective shootings were imposed by the Hungarian troops' refusal to leave the city, being "demonstrational". They were speculated by the Hungarian propaganda organs, which claimed (according to the opinion of Alexandru-Bogdan Kürti, distorting the truth) that their result would have been the filling streets of dead and wounded, and the town would have been savagely destroyed.

As a result of some acts of extreme violence against the soldiers of the Romanian army for which the civilian population was guilty, ^{[K]} the city of Zalău was condemned by a court decision of the XVI Armed Court from Debrecen, upon payment of a compensation "for the Romanian soldiers who were killed by the Szeklers"^{[L]} of 400,000 crowns and to a fine of approximately the same value. The mayor of the city, Adalbert Halmaghi, initiated a campaign to collect the said sum through donations from the population, and the town hall issued an order, which established the level of sums that the city's residents had to pay as compensation. The payment of these amounts with imputation character produced dissatisfaction, against the background of the differences in the economic possibilities of the inhabitants. Finally, on February 3, 1920, the sentence of the Military Court of Debrecen was annulled by the Supreme Court of Justice of Bucharest and the sums of money that the townspeople of Zalău contributed were able to be returned.

== Sources ==
- (in Romanian) Kirițescu, Constantin; Istoria războiului pentru întregirea României- Ediția a III-a, vol. II; Editura Științifică și Enciclopedică; București; 1989; ISBN 973-29-0048-2
- Torrey, Glenn E. (2011). The Romanian Battlefront in World War I. University Press of Kansas. ISBN 9780700620173.
- Treptow, Kurt W. (2003). A History of Romania (fourth ed.). Iași: Center for Romanian Studies. ISBN 9789739432351. OCLC 171567048.
- Eby, Cecil D. (2007). Hungary at War: Civilians and Soldiers in World War II. University Park: Penn State University Press. ISBN 9780271040882.
- Grad, Cornel (December 2010). "Contribuția armatei române la preluarea puterii politico-administrative în Transilvania. Primele măsuri (noiembrie 1918–aprilie 1919)" (PDF). Revista de Administrație Publică și Politici Sociale (in Romanian). II (4(5)): 51–79.
- Otu, Petre (1996). Regimentul 15 Războieni - File dintr-o istorie eroică (in Romanian). Iași: Editura A92.
- (in Romanian) Știrban, Marcel; Iancu, Gheorghe; Țepelea, Ioan; Racovițan, Mihai; Cap. IV Unirea și desăvârșirea statului național unitar în Istoria României. Transilvania, Vol. II; Ed. Gheorghe Barițiu; Cluj-Napoca; 1997; pp. 617–840
- (in Romanian) Szentpály-Juhász, Miklós; A zilahi eset (1919. február 22–27) [Cazul Zalău (22–27 februarie 1919)]; Ad Acta – A Hadtörténelmi Levéltár évkönyve [Anuarul Arhivelor Militare Istorice] 2002; Petit Real Könyvkiadó; Budapesta; 2003
