= Răstolț =

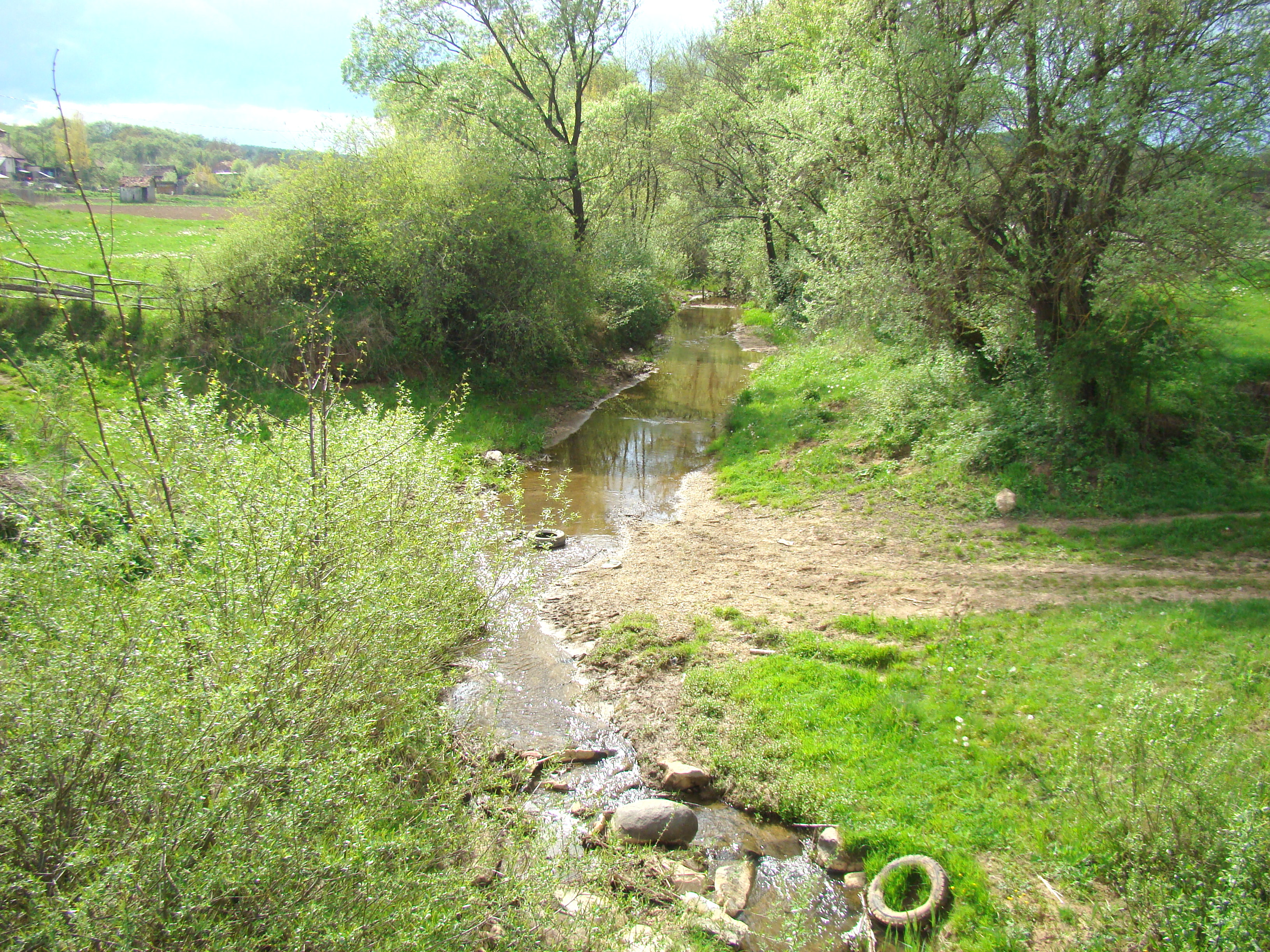

- Location within Romania

Location
- Country: Romania
- Counties: Sălaj County
- Villages: Răstolț, Răstolțu Deșert, Poarta Sălajului

Physical characteristics
- Mouth: Agrij
  - location: Românași
  - coordinates: 47.1002°N 23.1845°E
- Length: 16 km (9.9 mi)
- Basin size: 50 km^{2} (19 sq mi)

Basin features
- Progression: Agrij→ Someș→ Tisza→ Danube→ Black Sea

The Răstolț is a right tributary of the river Agrij in Romania. It flows into the Agrij near Românași. Its length is 16 km (9.9 mi) and its basin size is 50 km^{2} (19 sq mi).
