= Vármező =

Vármező is the Hungarian name for two places in Romania:

- Câmpu Cetăţii village, Eremitu Commune, Mureș County
- Buciumi Commune, Sălaj County
