= Treznea (river) =

- Location within Romania

Location
- Country: Romania
- Counties: Sălaj County
- Villages: Treznea, Românași

Physical characteristics
- Mouth: Agrij
  - location: Românași
  - coordinates: 47.1061°N 23.1842°E
- Length: 12 km (7.5 mi)
- Basin size: 46 km^{2} (18 sq mi)

Basin features
- Progression: Agrij→ Someș→ Tisza→ Danube→ Black Sea
- Tributaries
  - left: Ciumărna

The Treznea is a left tributary of the river Agrij in Romania. It flows into the Agrij in Românași. Its length is 12 km (7.5 mi) and its basin size is 46 km^{2} (18 sq mi).
