= Vaskapu =

Vaskapu can refer to:

- Vaskapu, the former Hungarian name of Poarta Sălajului, a village in Românași, Romania
- Iron Gates, a gorge on the Danube River known as Vaskapu in Hungarian
- Austro-Hungarian steamer blown up in the Burgas Bay in 1903 by IMRO-terrorists
