= Egrespatak =

Egrespatak is the Hungarian name for two places in Romania:

- Valea Agrişului village, Iara Commune, Cluj County
- Meseșenii de Jos Commune, Sălaj County
