= Szentpéterfalva =

Szentpéterfalva is the Hungarian name for several places in Romania:

- Sânpetru, a commune in Brașov County
- Sânpetru, a village in Sântămăria-Orlea Commune, Hunedoara County
- Bozna, a town in Treznea Commune, Sălaj County
