= Docidava (castra) =

Fort in the Roman province of Dacia

- castra of Buciumi
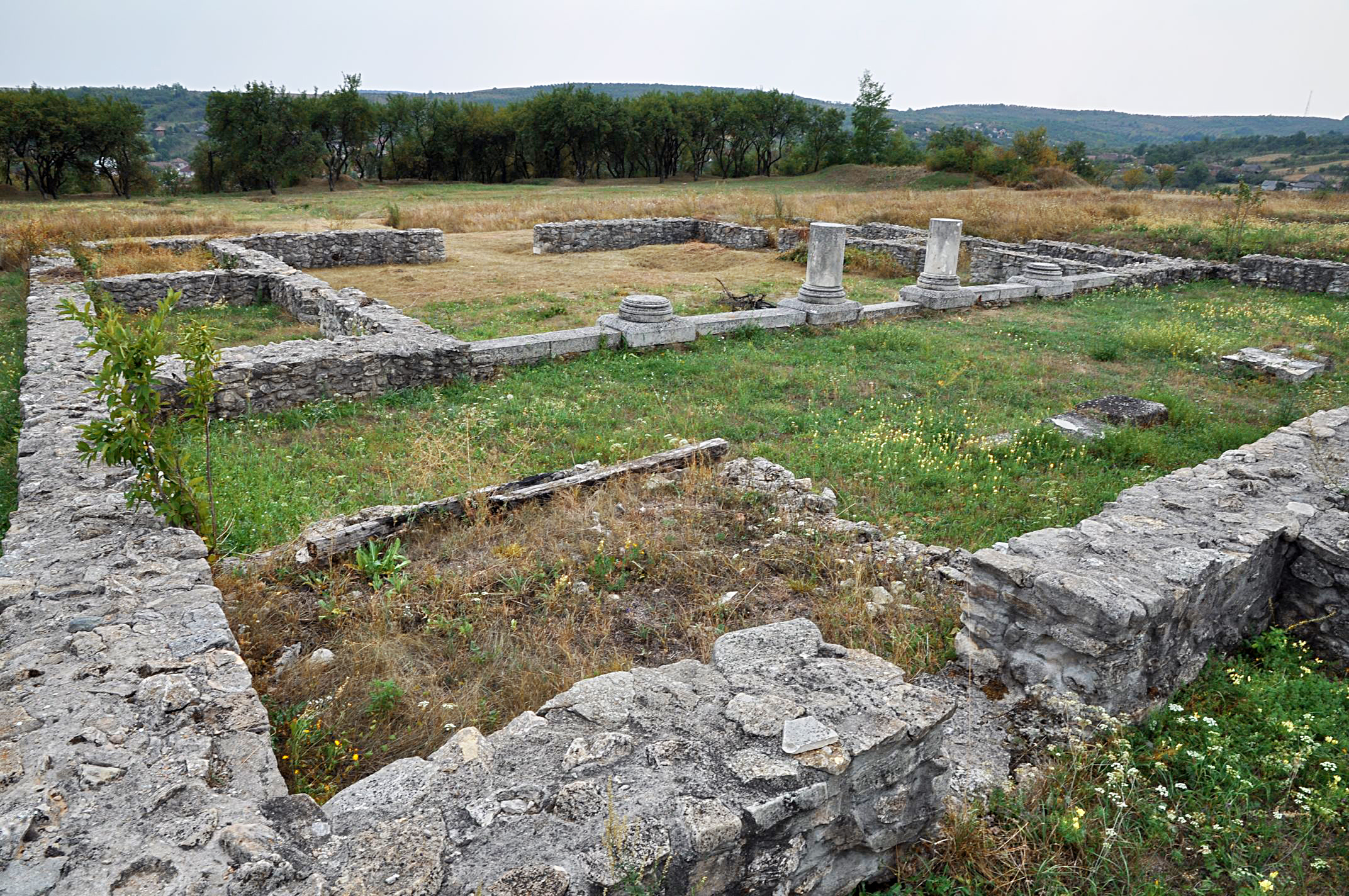
- Principia

- Location within Romania
- 47.048292°N 23.044678°E
- Location: Grădiște, Buciumi, Romania

History
- Founded: 2nd century AD
- Built: Trajan
- Abandoned: 3rd century AD

Site notes
- Elevation: 373 m (1,224 ft)
- Condition: Ruined

Docidava was a fort in the Roman province of Dacia in the 2nd and 3rd centuries AD. Remains of the surrounding vicus were also unearthed. The castra's ruins are located in Buciumi, Romania.

It controlled the road through the Rag pass cutting through Meseș Mountains which was blocked by a stone wall (clausura) directing the traffic to a guarded entrance, and the road from the fort of Bologa towards the central area of the NW segment of Limes Porolissensis. It was supported by two fortlets and approximately 23 towers.

== Gallery ==
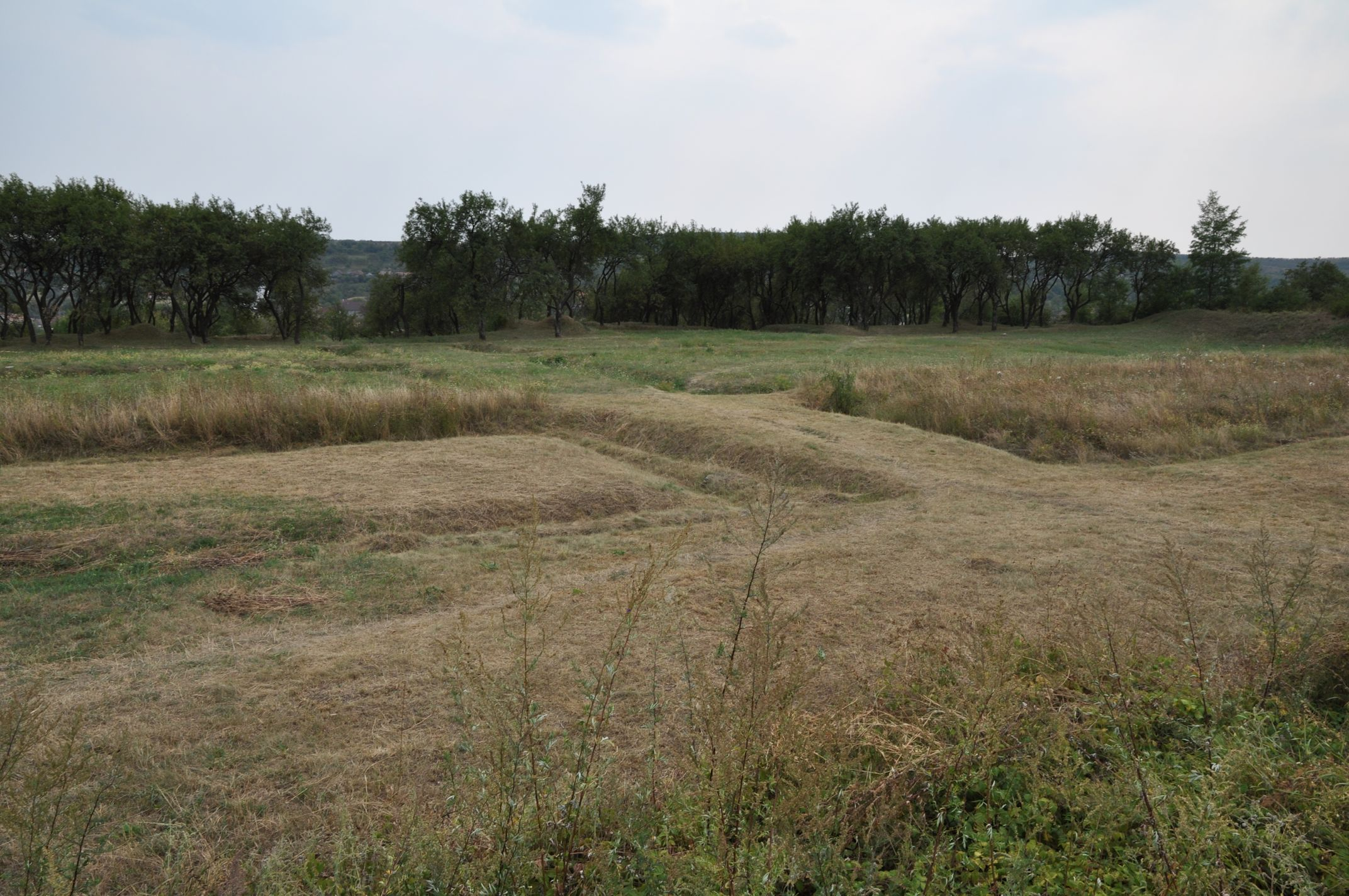
Via Praetoria

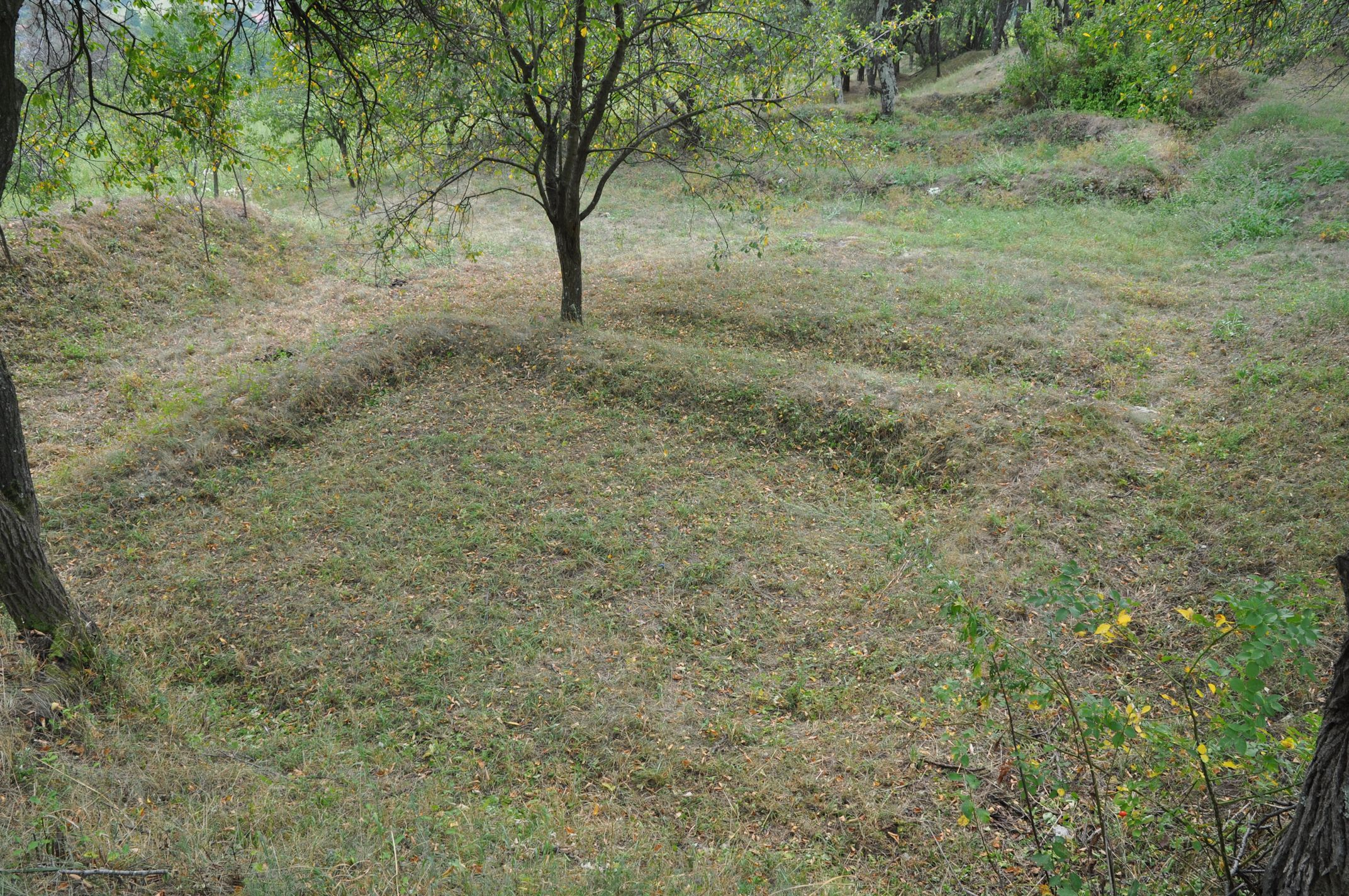
Porta Praetoria

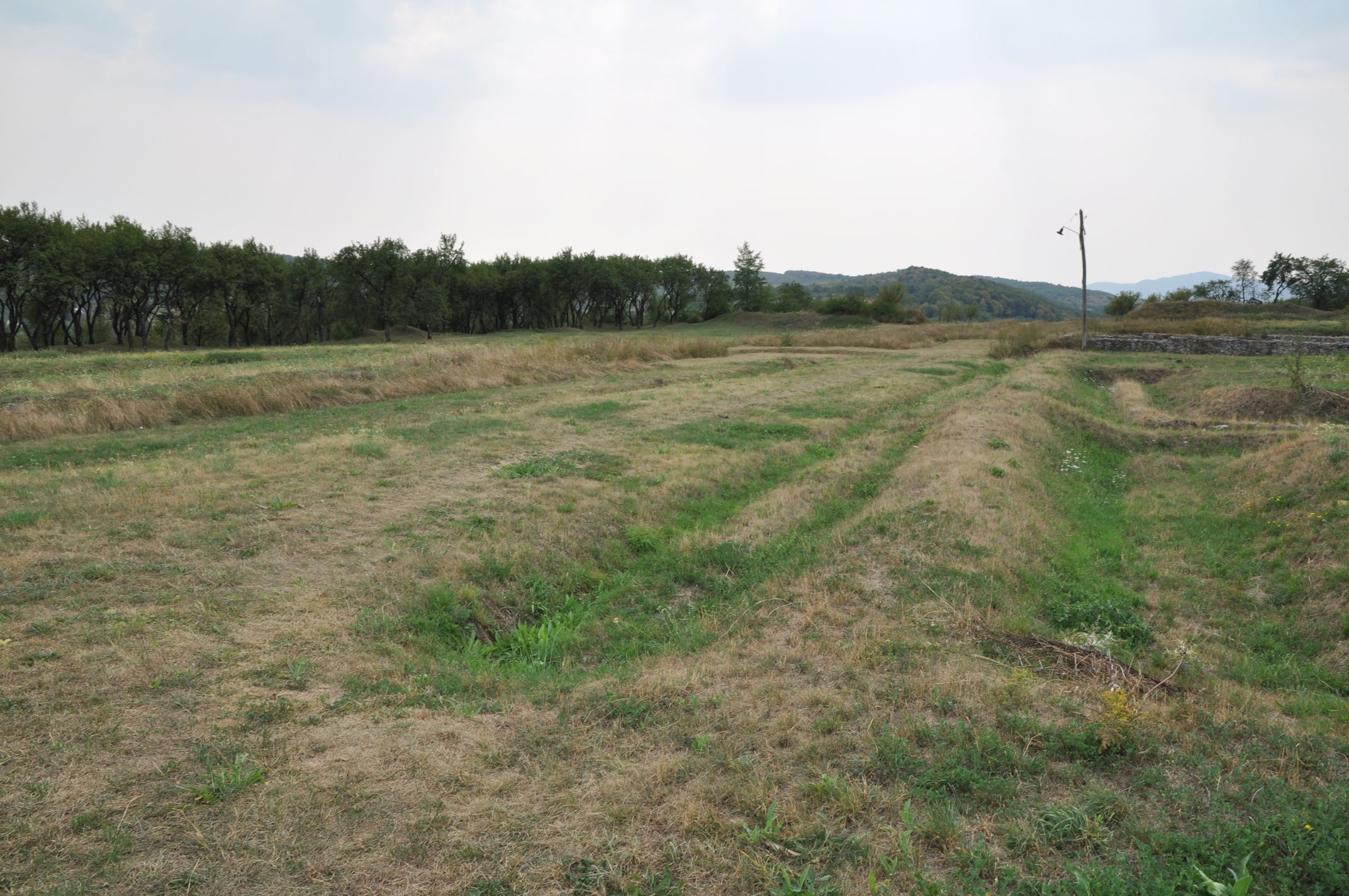
Via Principalis

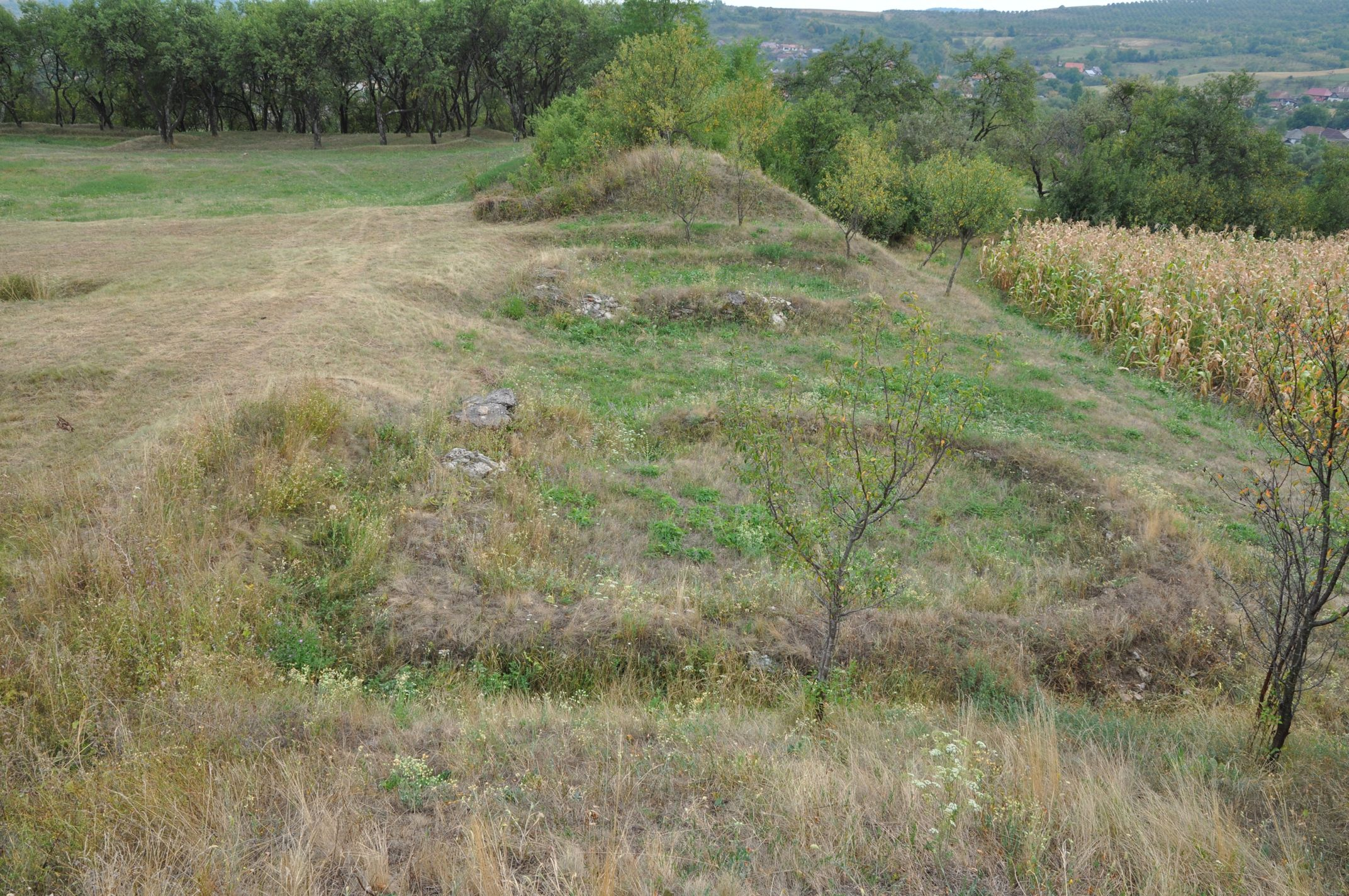
Porta Principalis Dextra

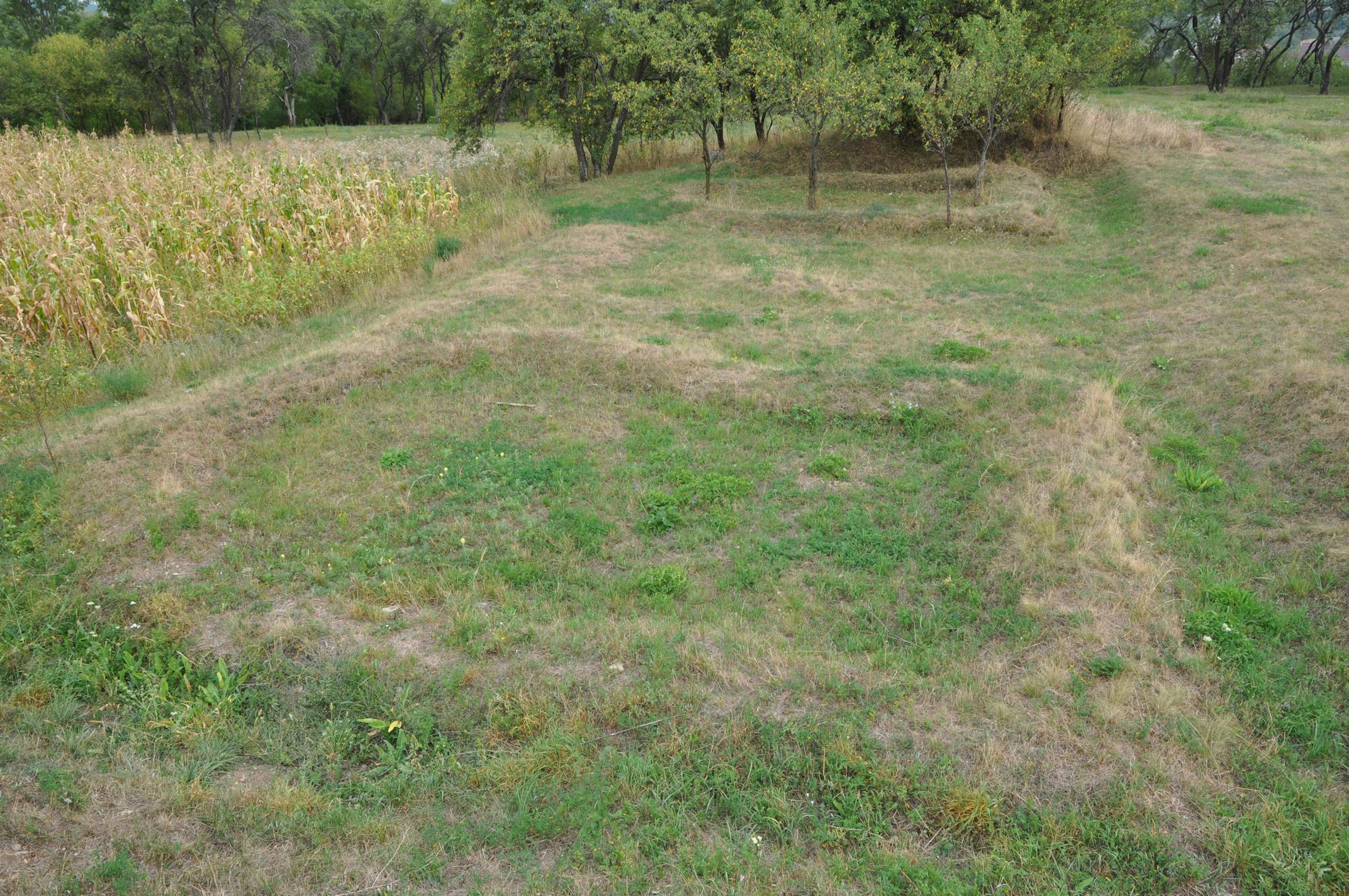
Porta Principalis Sinistra

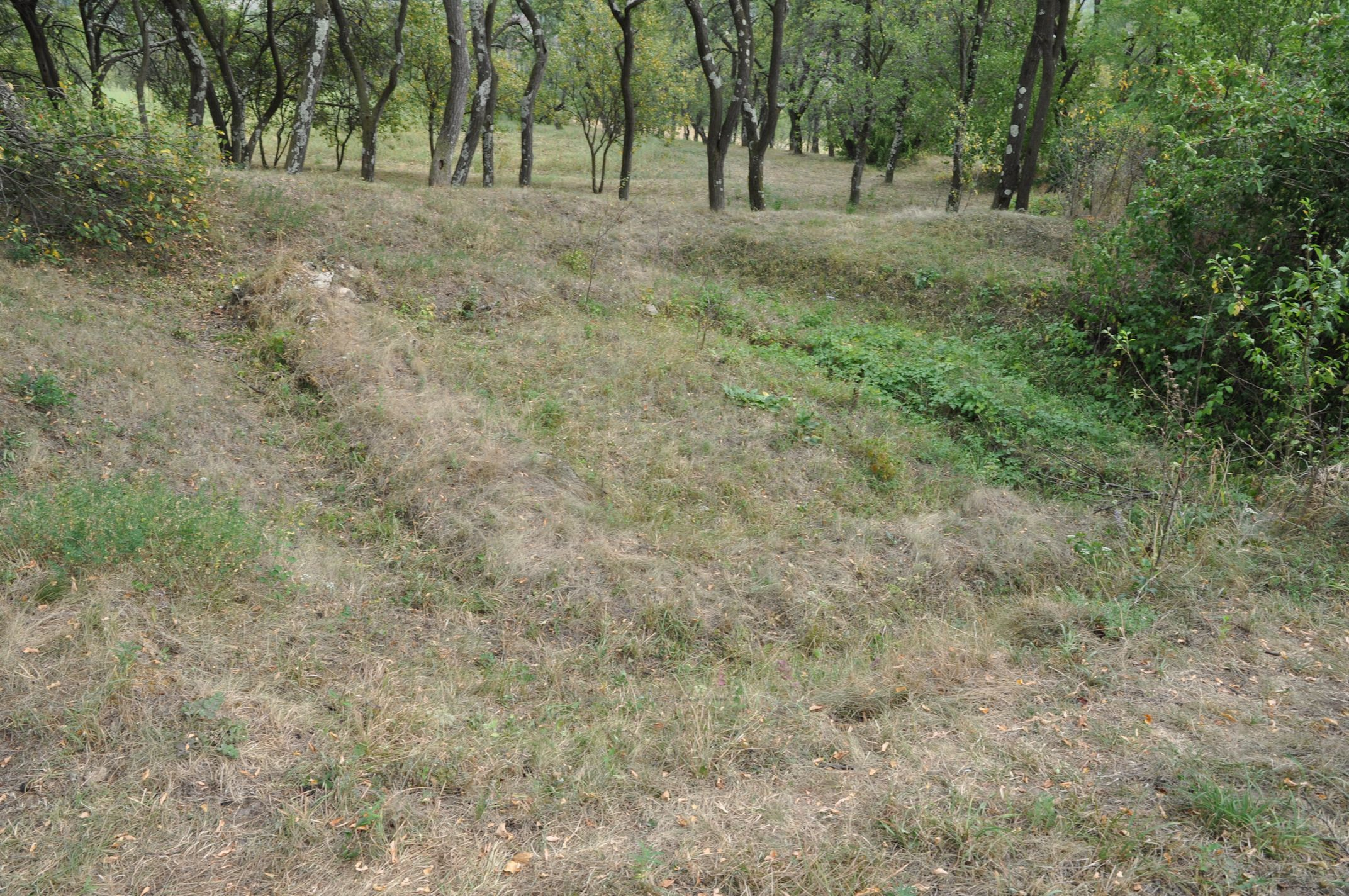
South round tower

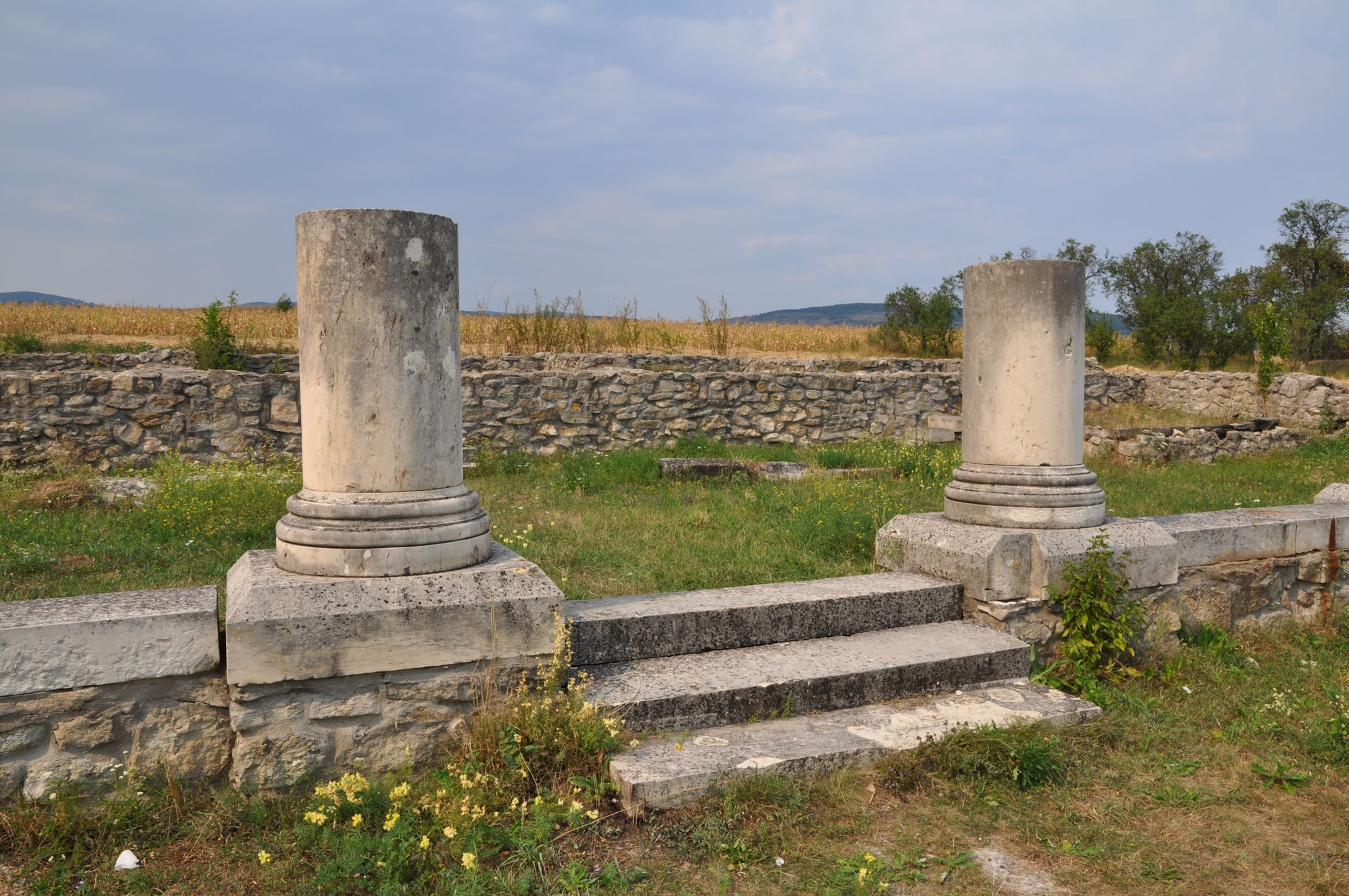
Columns of Principia

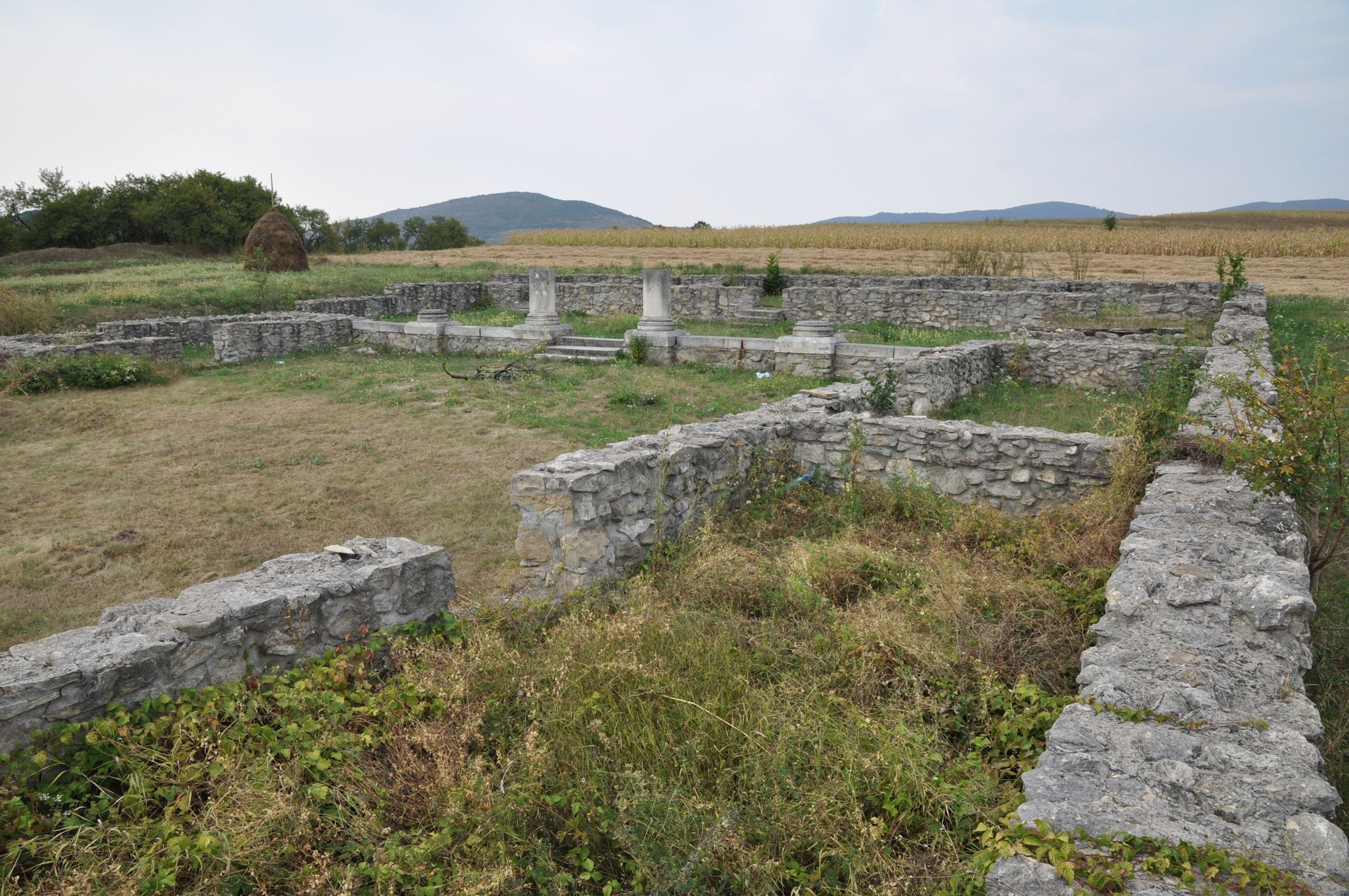
Principia

== See also ==
- List of castra
