= Țigani clash =

1918 skirmish

- Part of Hungarian–Romanian War
Date	14 January 1919 [O.S. 1 January 1919]
Location	modern Crișeni, Romania
Result	The clash lasted until the Hungarian regiment finished evacuating the city

Belligerents
Hungarian Republic	Kingdom of Romania

Commanders and leaders
Mihály Gyurotsik	Gheorghe Rozin

Casualties and losses
- 19 killed and wounded

The Țigani clash was a battle that took place on 14 January 1919 in Crișeni between Romanian and Hungarian troops in the area of Sălaj County, during the occupation of a new line of demarcation in Transylvania during the Hungarian–Romanian War. The incident involved Hungarian troops of the 24th Honvéd Infantry Regiment of the Székely Division and Romanian troops of the 16th Infantry Regiment of the 7th Infantry Division.

The collision in question took place in the area of the town of Țigani in the area of the railway deviation triangle leading to Zalău, and its cause is still unclear. It occurred both in the context of prior final notes exchanged between the local Hungarian and Romanian military commanders concerning the movement of their own troops into the immediate area, and in the context of an apparent prior agreement on the subject in question (negotiated, however, from a position of strength).

The event, which resulted in 6 dead, 13 wounded, and 7 missing on the Romanian side, involved battalion-sized military forces on both sides.

== Context ==
During the operation of the Romanian Army to occupy the line of demarcation in Transylvania between Romanian and Hungarian troops, the 13th and 14th Brigades of the 7th Infantry Division, respectively the 14th Infantry Regiment for Baia Mare and Sighetu Marmației and the 16th Infantry Regiment for Jibou and Zalău were assigned to ensure a new alignment. The occupation of the Baia Mare – Jibou – Zalău region ensured the Romanian Army the control of the middle Someș valley and of the railway in this valley. It also ensured the control of the communications hub represented by Jibou, which provided the link between the Someș valley railway and the one leading to Carei.

Reduced military forces were to be deployed on the new alignment intended to be occupied by the Romanian troops. As such, the hot-headed spirits of the Hungarian troops stationed in Zalău, among whom Major Mihály Gyurotsik (whose family lived in the city itself) stood out, were predisposed to a bellicose attitude.

== Clash ==
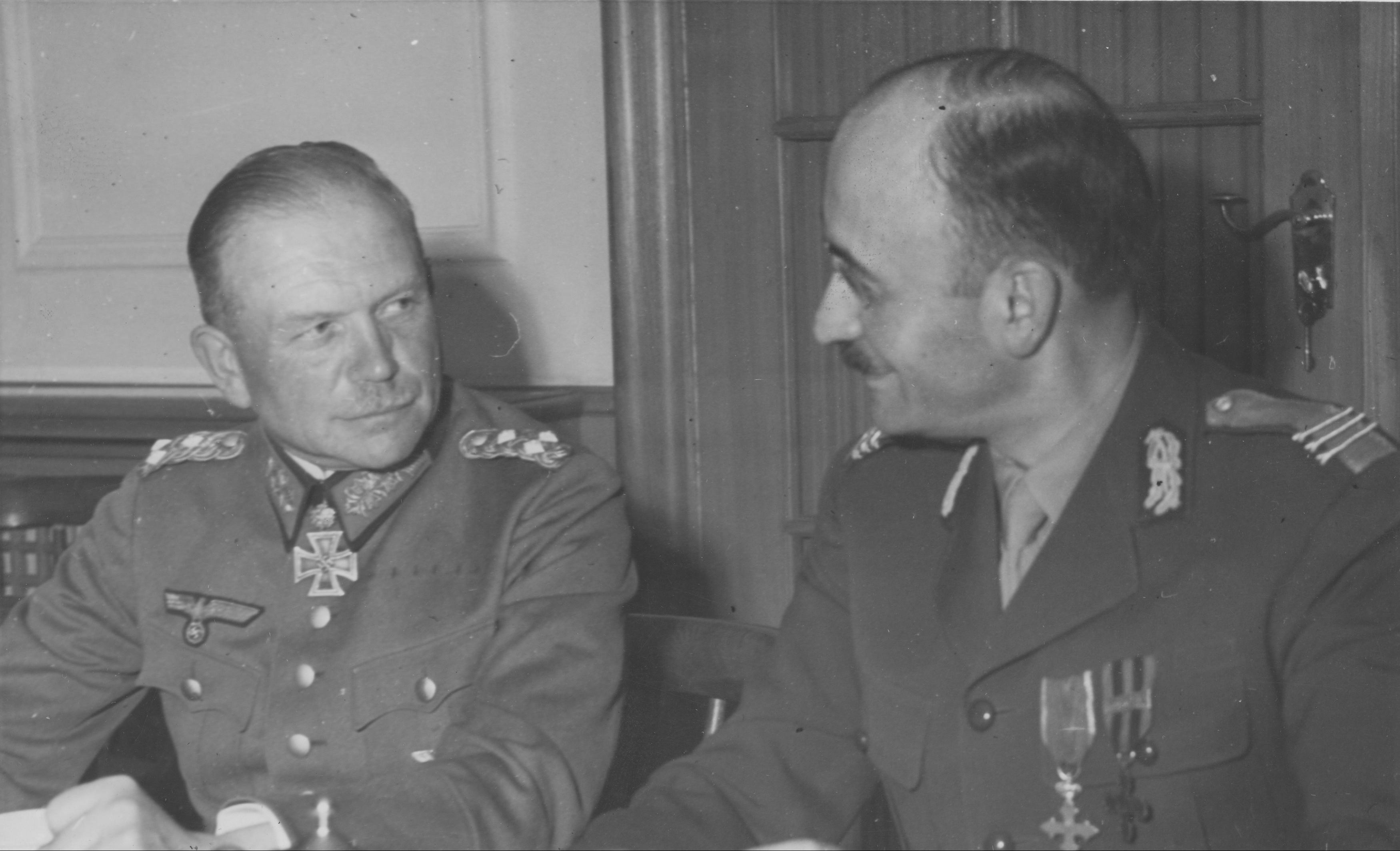
Gheorghe Rozin in 1944 (on the right), with Heinz Guderian

On 14 January 1919 [O.S. 1 January 1919], two companies and two Romanian machine gun sections set out for Zalău to take the city under control. According to the Hungarian historian Gottfried Barna, what happened was an act of force on the part of the Romanian troops. According to Barna, however, the sources are unclear and do not explain why the clash took place despite the agreement. In his opinion, the desire of the Romanians to take possession of the locality before it was evacuated by Hungarian troops was the reason for the conflict. According to the Romanian historian Cornel Grad, the Romanian troops were waiting on board the train at the Gârceiu station for the withdrawal of the last Hungarian troops, after which they moved towards the Țigani station.

In the deviation triangle of the railway leading to Zalău, the line had been mined by the Hungarian troops, who stopped the train with Romanian soldiers near the Țigani station, 5 km (3.1 mi) north of Zalău and stormed it. In return, the rest of the 2nd Battalion of the 16th Infantry Regiment, under the command of major Gheorghe Rozin, regrouped from Jibou on the hills of Ortelec and counter-attacked. The fighting continued until the Hungarian regiment left the city.

The Romanian troops recovered the train on 14 January and occupied the territory up to the demarcation line - beyond which the Hungarian troops retreated. On 15 January, the Romanian soldiers entered Zalău.

== Aftermath ==
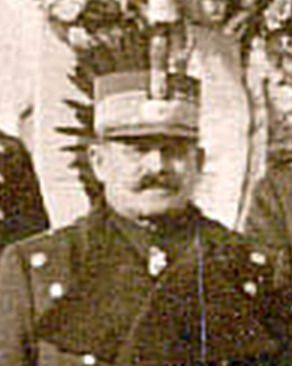
Constantin Neculcea in 1918

The incident resulted in 6 dead, 13 wounded, and 7 missing on the Romanian side. Of the dead, one was killed during the attack and the other 5 who were wagon drivers, after being captured. All were buried with military honors in the city cemetery. The injured were taken to the City Hospital in Zalău for treatment.

An investigation into the incident took place under the leadership of the Romanian general Constantin Neculcea (the commander of the 7th Infantry Division) and the French general Henry Patey. The investigation concluded that the Hungarian authorities were to blame. In Zalău, a telegram was found from the Commissioner General of Eastern Hungary in Cluj, Professor István Apáthy, urging Hungarian troops to resist. General Neculcea ordered Apáthy to be arrested and put on trial, and the municipality of Cluj was obliged to pay 900,000 Austro-Hungarian crowns to the families of those who died in the incident and to financially support the payment of funeral expenses, as well as the raising of a monument dedicated to the victims of the attack. Also, notable people from Zalău and neighboring towns were arrested.^{[E]} In 1920, the monument, whose erection was decided by General Neculcea, was inaugurated in the presence of General Constantin Petala.

After what happened in Țigani, the subunit of Gyurotsik (the officer directly involved in the events) was transferred to Hajdúszoboszló, near Debrecen. He soon returned to Sălaj, being deployed to Nușfalău and Șimleu Silvaniei. Gyurotsik's family, however, remained in Zalău, which would prove important later.

== Sources ==
- Grad, Cornel (December 2010). "Contribuția armatei române la preluarea puterii politico-administrative în Transilvania. Primele măsuri (noiembrie 1918–aprilie 1919)" (PDF). Revista de Administrație Publică și Politici Sociale (in Romanian). II (4(5)): 71–72.
