= Ortelec =

- Location within Romania

Location
- Country: Romania
- Counties: Sălaj County
- Villages: Ortelec, Moigrad-Porolissum, Brebi, Creaca

Physical characteristics
- Mouth: Agrij
  - location: Creaca
  - coordinates: 47.1918°N 23.2426°E
- Length: 15 km (9.3 mi)
- Basin size: 47 km^{2} (18 sq mi)

Basin features
- Progression: Agrij→ Someș→ Tisza→ Danube→ Black Sea

The Ortelec is a left tributary of the river Agrij in Romania. It flows into the Agrij in Creaca. Its length is 15 km (9.3 mi) and its basin size is 47 km^{2} (18 sq mi).
