= Ioan Pușcaș =

Ioan Puşcaş (10 July 1932 – 4 April 2015) was a Romanian gastroenterologist, born in Treznea, Sălaj. In the 1970s, he proposed the use of carbonic anhydrase (CA) inhibitor acetazolamide to heal peptic ulcers.

In 1962, he became a medicine practitioner in Oradea, then transferred, on request, to the Simleu Silvaniei hospital, where he became an active physician of internal medicine.

In 1972 he patented the Ulcosilvanil drug, a drug with a 100% cure rate for gastric ulcers.

In 1976 he did a training course at Bichat Hospital in Paris and in 1977 took specialization course on issues of endoscopy, at the Leiden University Clinic in the Netherlands. Back home, he introduced the digestive endoscopy to the Simleu hospital.

In 1980 he was the first Romanian doctor using optical video-endoscopy and introduces the use of electronic video-endoscopy in 1985. In 1987 he was appointed director of the Simleu-Silvaniei Hospital, which now bears his name, and in 1990 became director of the Center for Healthcare Research and. In parallel, he was a professor with the department of internal medicine and gastroenterology at the Medical Faculty of Oradea and led many doctorates in medicine.

He won two gold medals for medical breakthroughs and has 42 patents. He published over 600 scientific papers in national and international journals. He has published 17 books, many of them being translated into English, Portuguese, Spanish, Japanese. He is a Doctor Honoris Causa and a member of the United States Academy of Sciences. He practiced medicine at the hospital that bears his name in the Romanian town of Șimleu Silvaniei. He died in the hospital in April 2015, aged 82.
