= Crișeni =

Crișeni Cigányi
- Commune
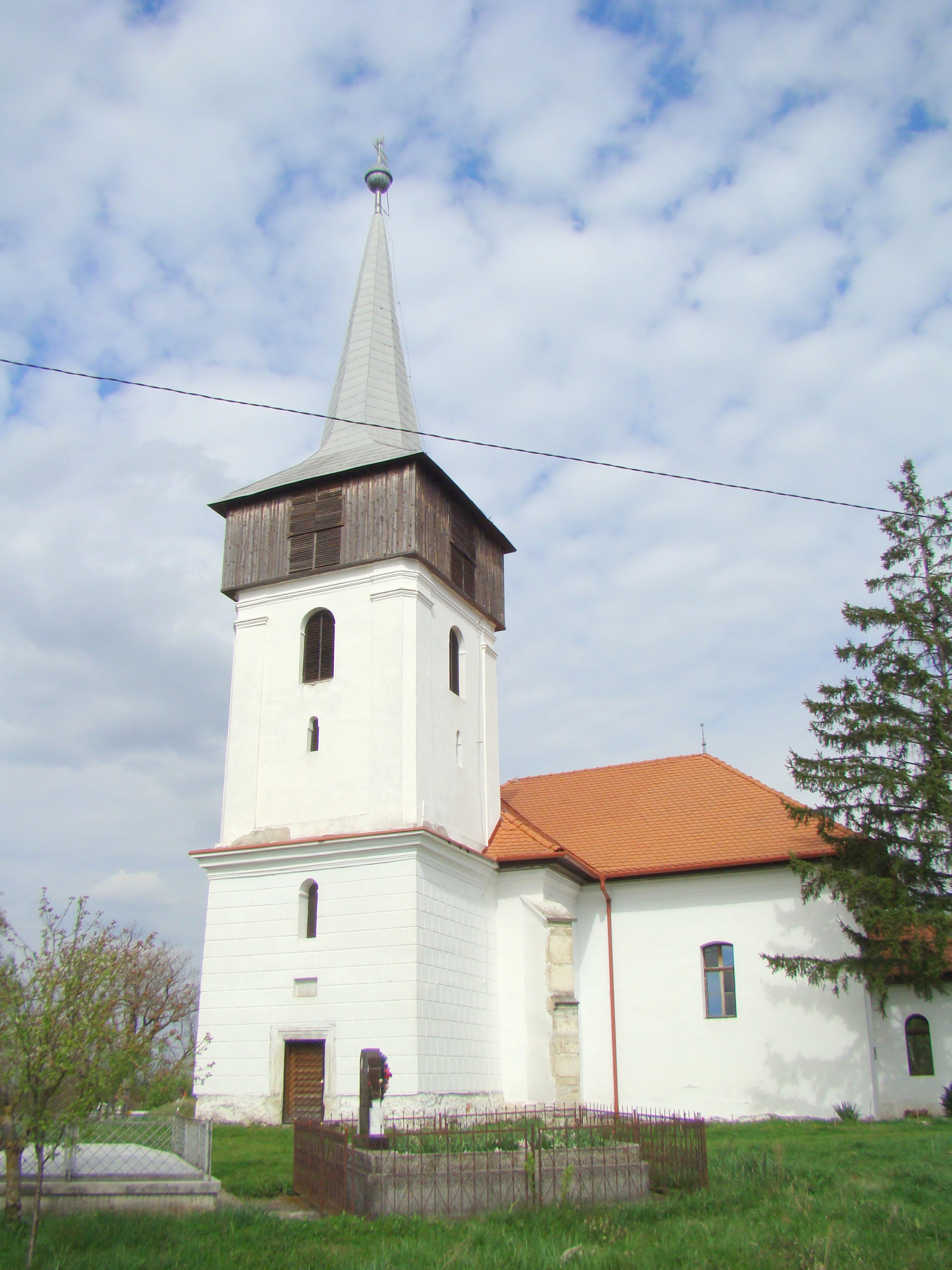
- Reformed church in Cristur-Crișeni

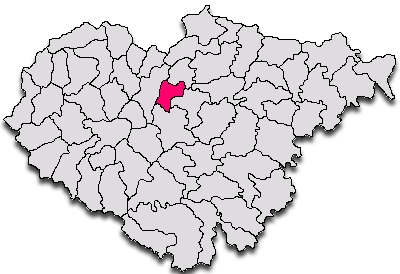
- Location in Sălaj County

- Location in Romania
- Coordinates: 47°14′N 23°03′E
- Country: Romania
- County: Sălaj

Government
  - Mayor (2020–2024): Vasile-Călin Morar (PNL)
- Area: 32.77 km^{2} (12.65 sq mi)
- Elevation: 252 m (827 ft)
- Population (2021-12-01): 3,326
  - Density: 101.5/km^{2} (262.9/sq mi)
- Time zone: UTC+02:00 (EET)
  - Summer (DST): UTC+03:00 (EEST)
- Postal code: 457105
- Area code: +40 x59
- Vehicle reg.: SJ
- Website: primariacriseni.ro

Crișeni (Hungarian: Cigányi) is a commune in Sălaj County, Crișana, Romania. It consists of three villages: Crișeni, Cristur-Crișeni (Szilágyfőkeresztúr), and Gârceiu (Szilágygörcsön). Crișeni village was founded in 1387. The local economy consists of crafts, services, agriculture, trade, and tourism.

The commune is located in the central part of Sălaj County, just north of the county seat, Zalău. It is crossed by national road DN1H and by county road DJ108D; European route E81 links Crișeni to Zalău.

== Population ==
At the 2021 census, Crișeni had a population of 3,326. Of those, 64.9% were Romanians, 20.7% Hungarians, and 6.79% Roma. At the 2011 census, the commune had 2,641 inhabitants.

== Sights ==
- Reformed Church in Cristur-Crișeni, built in the late 16th century, historic monument

== See also ==
- Țigani clash, 1919 military engagement in modern Crișeni
