= Treznea =

- Commune
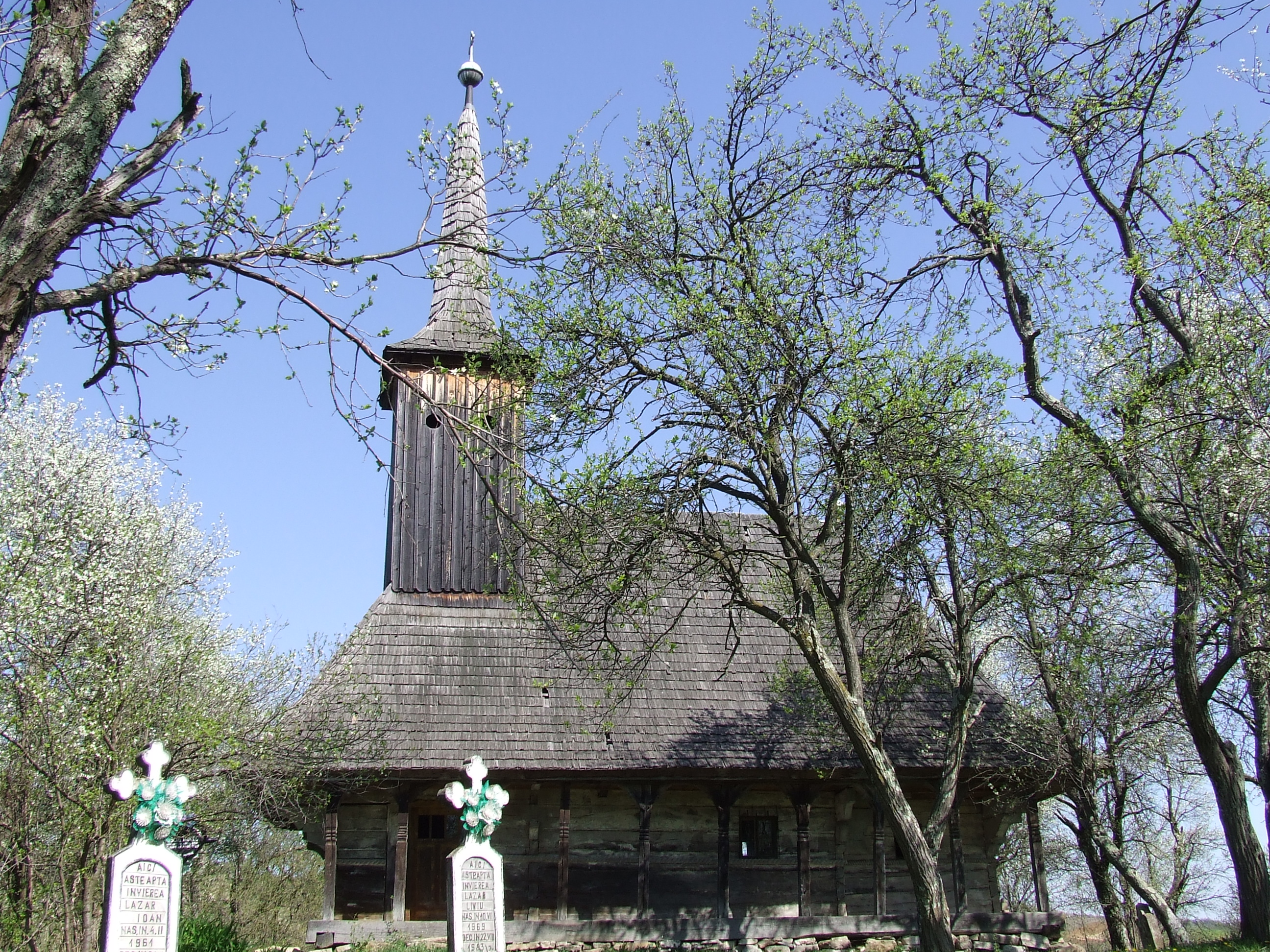
- Wooden Church in Bozna

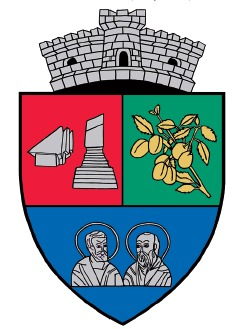
- Coat of arms

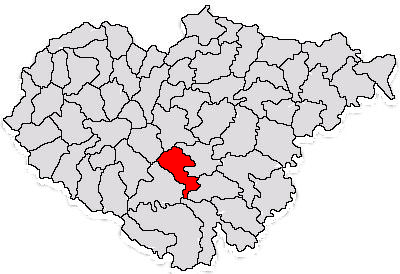
- Location in Sălaj County

- Location in Romania
- Coordinates: 47°06′20″N 23°06′29″E
- Country: Romania
- County: Sălaj

Government
  - Mayor (2020–2024): Cristian Oros (PSD)
- Area: 37.05 km^{2} (14.31 sq mi)
- Elevation: 304 m (997 ft)
- Population (2021-12-01): 1,013
  - Density: 27.34/km^{2} (70.81/sq mi)
- Time zone: UTC+02:00 (EET)
  - Summer (DST): UTC+03:00 (EEST)
- Postal code: 457340
- Area code: +(40) x60
- Vehicle reg.: SJ
- Website: primariatreznea.ro

Treznea (Hungarian: Ördögkút, lit. "The Devil's Fountain"; German: Teufelsbrunnen) is a commune in Sălaj County, Crișana, Romania. It is composed of two villages, Bozna (Szentpéterfalva) and Treznea. These were part of Agrij Commune until 1995, when they were split off to form a separate commune.

== Geography ==
The commune is situated in the foothills of the Meseș Mountains, at an altitude of 304 m (997 ft), on the banks of the river Treznea. It is located in the central-south part of Sălaj County, at a distance of 14 km (8.7 mi) from the county seat, Zalău.

Treznea is crossed by county road DJ108R, which starts in Agrij and ends in a few miles in DN1F (part of European route E81), a road which connects Cluj-Napoca to Zalău, and continues to the Hungarian border near Carei.

== History ==
The commune is the site of the Treznea massacre, which occurred on September 9, 1940, during the handing over of Northern Transylvania from Romania to Hungary, pursuant to the Second Vienna Award. The massacre, in which 87 ethnic Romanians and 6 Jews were killed, was perpetrated by Hungarian Army troops with aid from some locals. A monument in memory of the victims was built in 1984 in the center of the village, and a common grave was set up in the local cemetery.

== Population ==
At the 2002 census, Treznea had a population of 1,033, of which 94.09% were Romanians, 5.72% Roma, and 0.19% Hungarians. At the 2011 census, there were 947 inhabitants; of those, 88.17% were Romanians and 8.45% Roma. At the 2021 census, the population reached 1,013, with 94.18% being Romanians.

== Natives ==
- Ioan Pușcaș (1932 – 2015), gastroenterologist

== Sights ==
- Wooden Church in Bozna, built in the 18th century, historic monument
- Bay Castle in Treznea, built in the 19th century, historic monument
