= Meseșenii de Jos =

Meseșenii de Jos Magyarkecel
- Commune
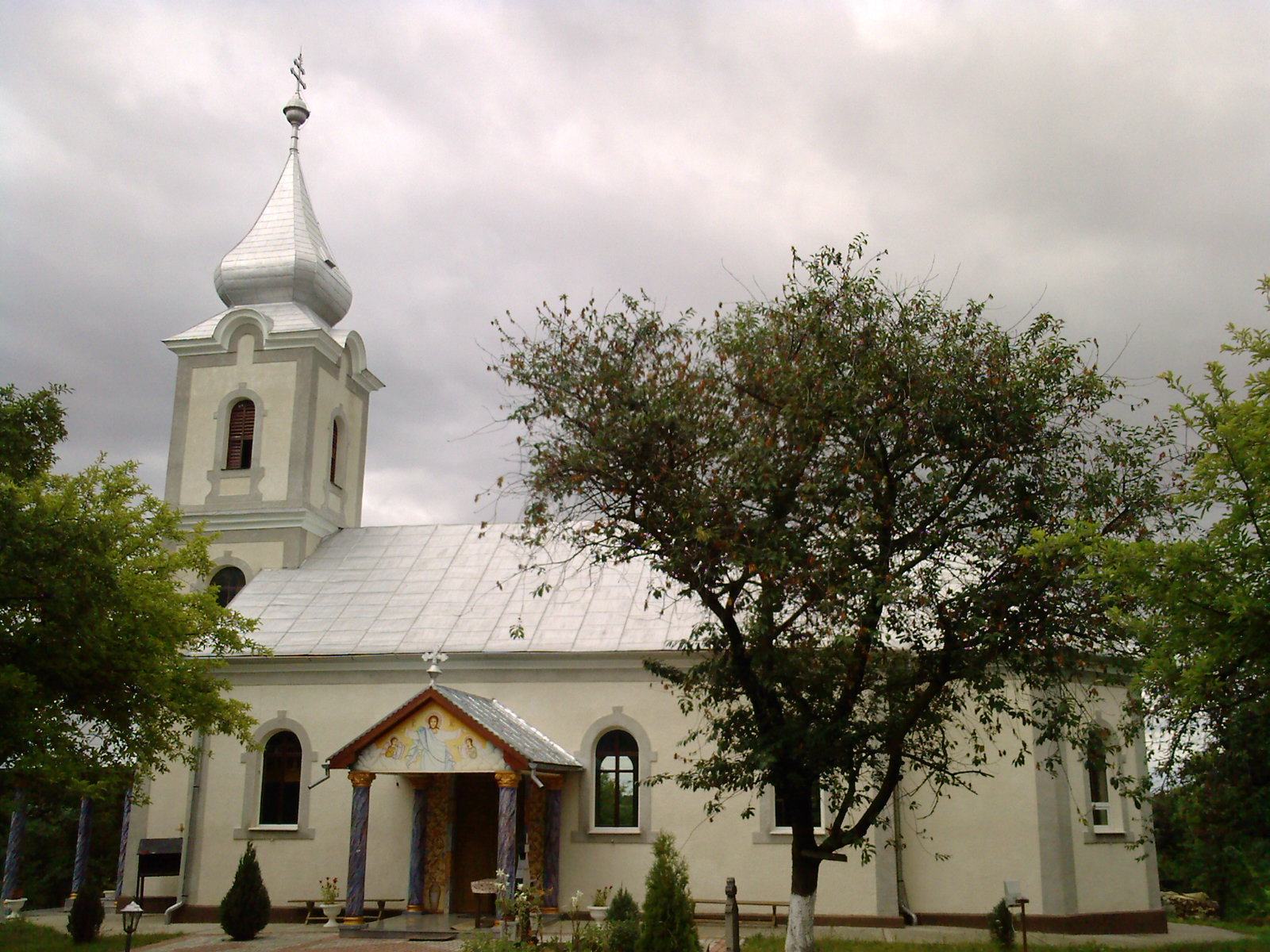
- Orthodox Church in Aghireș

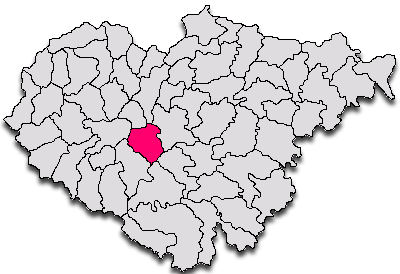
- Location in Sălaj County

- Location in Romania
- Coordinates: 47°9′N 22°59′E
- Country: Romania
- County: Sălaj

Government
  - Mayor (2020–2024): Alexandru Bercean (PSD)
- Area: 62.86 km^{2} (24.27 sq mi)
- Elevation: 254 m (833 ft)
- Population (2021-12-01): 3,317
  - Density: 52.77/km^{2} (136.7/sq mi)
- Time zone: UTC+02:00 (EET)
  - Summer (DST): UTC+03:00 (EEST)
- Postal code: 457245
- Area code: +(40) 0260
- Vehicle reg.: SJ
- Website: www.meseseniidejos.ro

Meseșenii de Jos (Hungarian: Magyarkecel) is a commune located in Sălaj County, Crișana, Romania. It is composed of four villages: Aghireș (Egrespatak), Fetindia (Gurzófalva), Meseșenii de Jos, and Meseșenii de Sus (Oláhkecel).

In Romanian, Meseșenii de Jos was traditionally known as Cățălul-unguresc. A 1925 law gave it the name Cățelul; this became Cățălu in 1956. The current name dates to 1960. Meseșenii de Sus, historically Cățălul-român, was Cățelușu from 1925 and Cățălușa from 1956, before acquiring its current name in 1960.

== Sights ==
- Reformed Church in Meseșenii de Jos (construction in the 15th century), historic monument
- Orthodox Church in Meseșenii de Jos (construction 1875)
- Orthodox Church in Meseșenii de Sus (construction 1785), historic monument
- Orthodox Church in Aghireș
