= Agrij =

- Commune
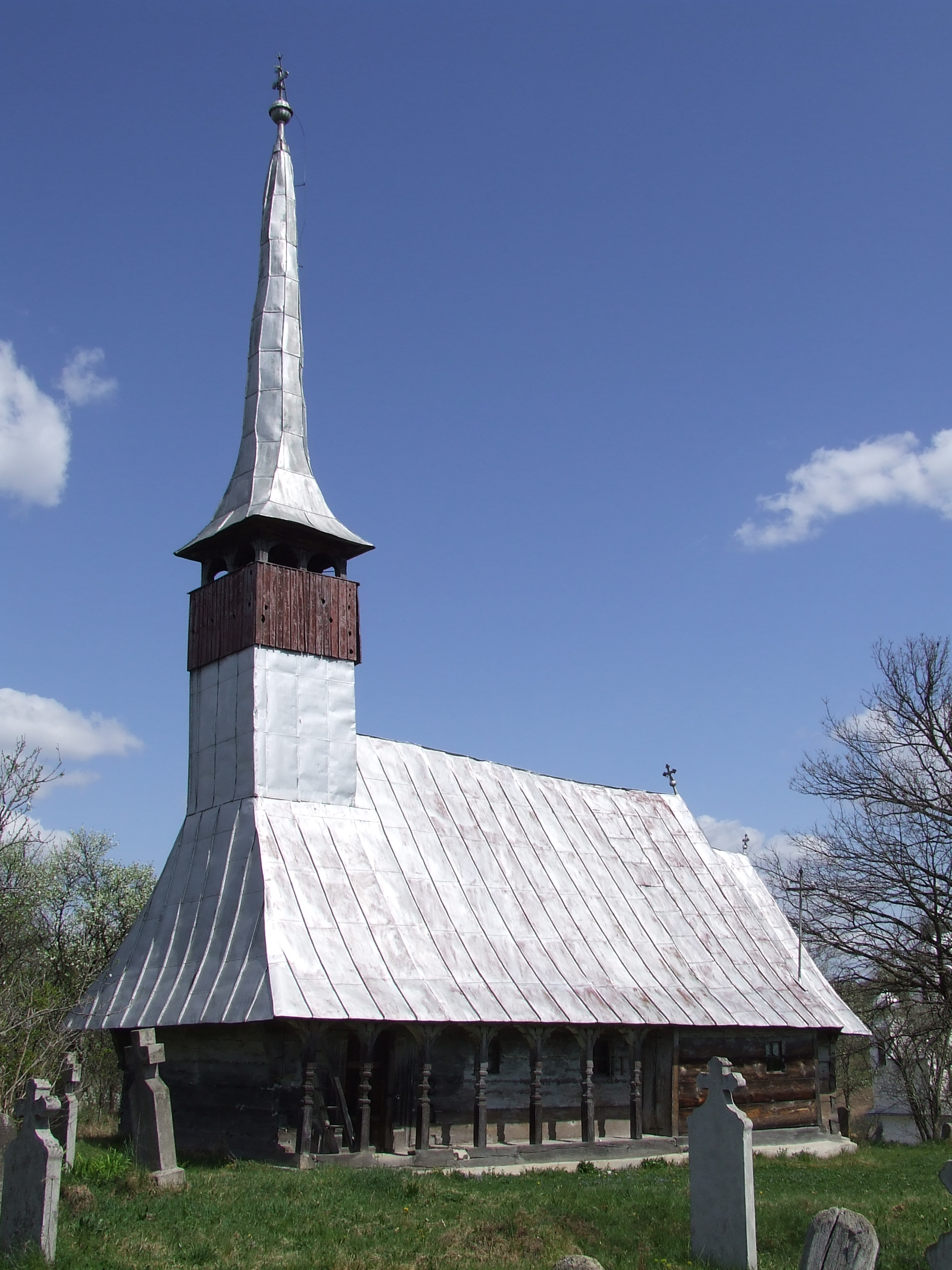
- Wooden church in Răstolțu Deșert

- Location in Sălaj County

- Location in Romania
- Coordinates: 47°4′N 23°6′E
- Country: Romania
- County: Sălaj

Government
  - Mayor (2020–2024): Ștefan Berar (PNL)
- Area: 33.03 km^{2} (12.75 sq mi)
- Elevation: 303 m (994 ft)
- Population (2021-12-01): 1,397
  - Density: 42.29/km^{2} (109.5/sq mi)
- Time zone: UTC+02:00 (EET)
  - Summer (DST): UTC+03:00 (EEST)
- Postal code: 457005
- Area code: +(40) 0260
- Vehicle reg.: SJ
- Website: comuna-agrij.ro

Agrij (Hungarian: Felsőegregy) is a commune located in Sălaj County, Crișana, Romania. It is composed of two villages, Agrij and Răstolțu Deșert (Pusztarajtolc). It was called Treznea-Agrij from 1988 to 1995, when Treznea and Bozna villages were split off to form Treznea Commune.

== Sights ==
- Wooden Church in Răstolțu Deșert (built in the 19th century), historic monument
