= Creaca =

- Commune
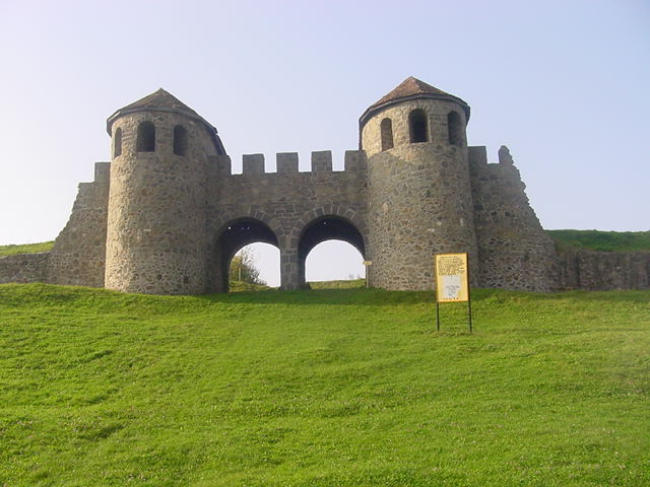
- Porolissum

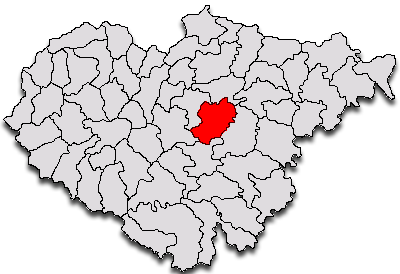
- Location in Sălaj County

- Location in Romania
- Coordinates: 47°11′50″N 23°14′0″E
- Country: Romania
- County: Sălaj

Government
  - Mayor (2020–2024): Ioan-Eugen Terec (PNL)
- Area: 74.16 km^{2} (28.63 sq mi)
- Highest elevation: 650 m (2,130 ft)
- Lowest elevation: 200 m (660 ft)
- Population (2021-12-01): 2,890
  - Density: 39.0/km^{2} (101/sq mi)
- Time zone: UTC+02:00 (EET)
  - Summer (DST): UTC+03:00 (EEST)
- Postal code: 457096
- Area code: +40 260 and +40 360
- Vehicle reg.: SJ
- Website: comunacreaca.ro

Creaca (Hungarian: Karika) is a commune located in Sălaj County, Crișana, Romania.

== Villages ==
The commune is composed of nine villages: Borza (Egregyborzova), Brebi (Beréd), Brusturi (Somróújfalu), Ciglean (Csiglen), Creaca, Jac (Zsákfalva), Lupoaia (Farkasmező), Prodănești (Prodánfalva), and Viile Jacului (Szállásszőlőhegy). The largest village in terms of population and area is Jac, and the smallest is Viile Jacului.

== History ==
In the 1st century AD, Porolissum, an ancient Roman city in Dacia was built on the western part of the commune. The city was the most north-eastern outpost of the Roman Empire, and garrisoned 5,000 auxiliary soldiers transferred from Spain, Gaul, and Britain.

== Demographics ==
At the 2002 census, the commune had 3,046 inhabitants, of which 97.8% were Romanians and 2.1% Roma; 71.1% were Romanian Orthodox, 13.8% Baptist, 12.5% Pentecostal, and 2.1% stated they belonged to another religion. At the 2021 census, Creaca had a population of 2,890; of those, 89.27% were Romanians and 4.43% Roma.

== Politics and administration ==
The commune of Creaca is administered by a mayor and a local council composed of 11 councillors. The mayor, Ioan-Eugen Terec, from the National Liberal Party, has been in office since 2008. As of the 2024 local elections, the local council has the following political party composition:

Party	Seats in 2024	Current Council
National Liberal Party (PNL)	6	
Social Democratic Party (PSD)	3	
Alliance for the Union of Romanians (AUR)	2	

== Education ==
There is a primary school (grades 1 to 8) in Creaca and Jac and only 1-4 grades in the rest of the villages, except Viile Jacului.

== Occupations ==
Although the commune has rich underground resources—coal at Lupoaia, quartz sands at Borza, and limestone currently exploited at Prodănești—agriculture remains the main branch of activity. The main occupations are tied to farming around the villages, but most of the men have left to work in other European Union countries. Those who remain are employed mainly in Zalău, commuting between Zalău and the commune’s villages. During the communist era, people worked mostly in Zalău and on state farms.

== Gallery ==
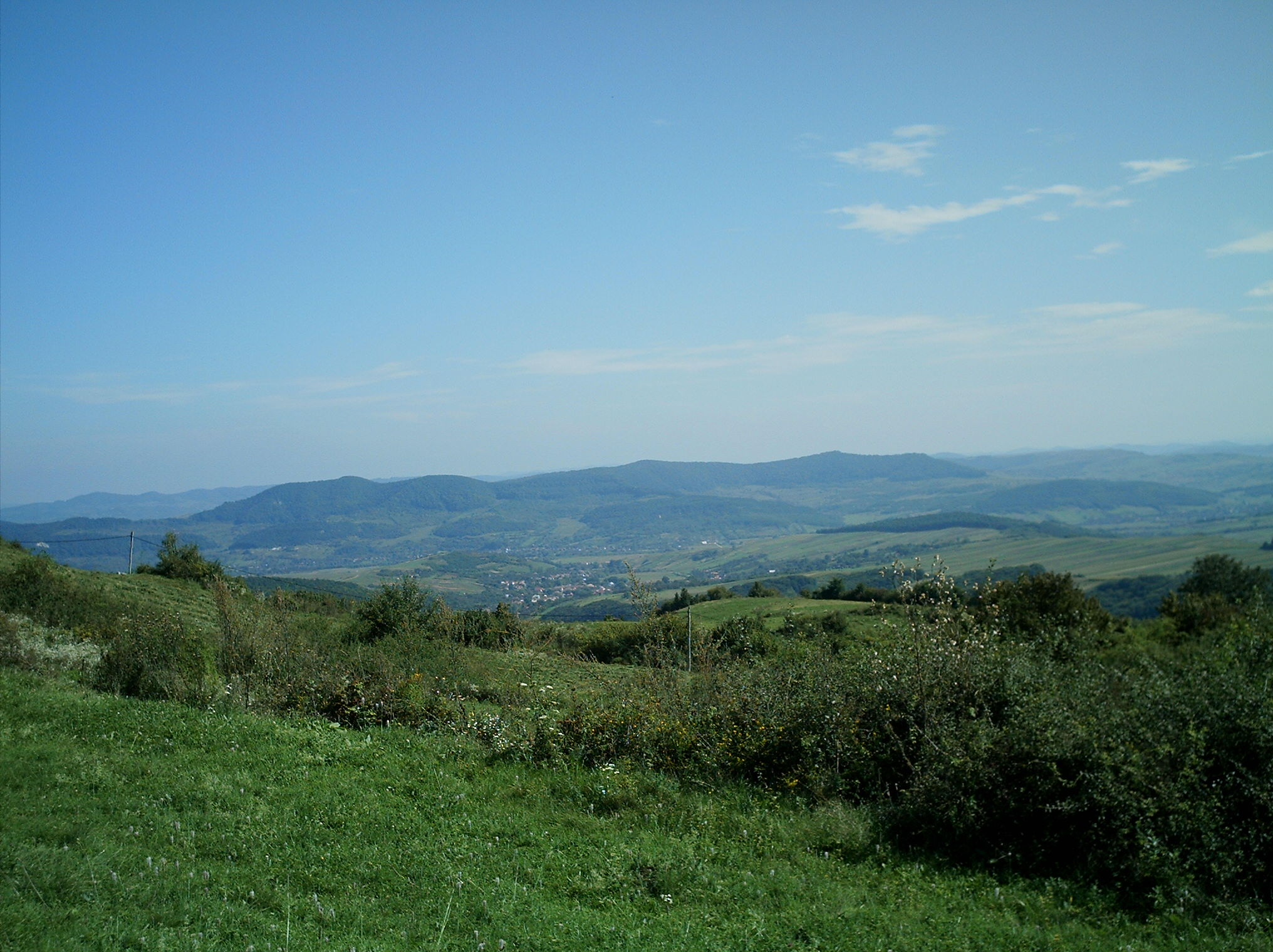
View of Jac village

Bust of Trajan in Jac

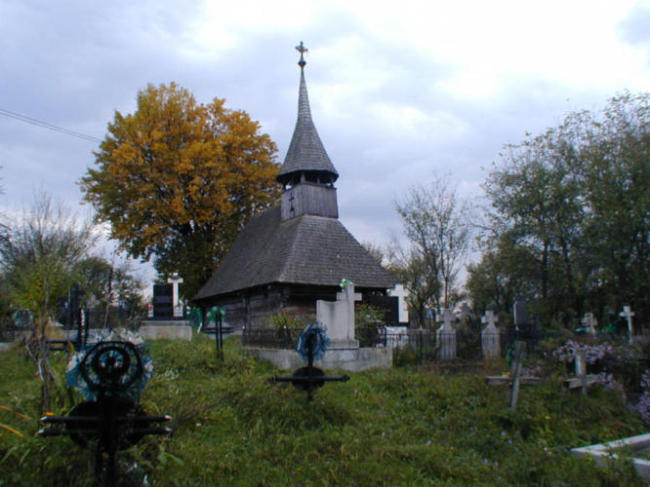
Wooden Orthodox church in Jac

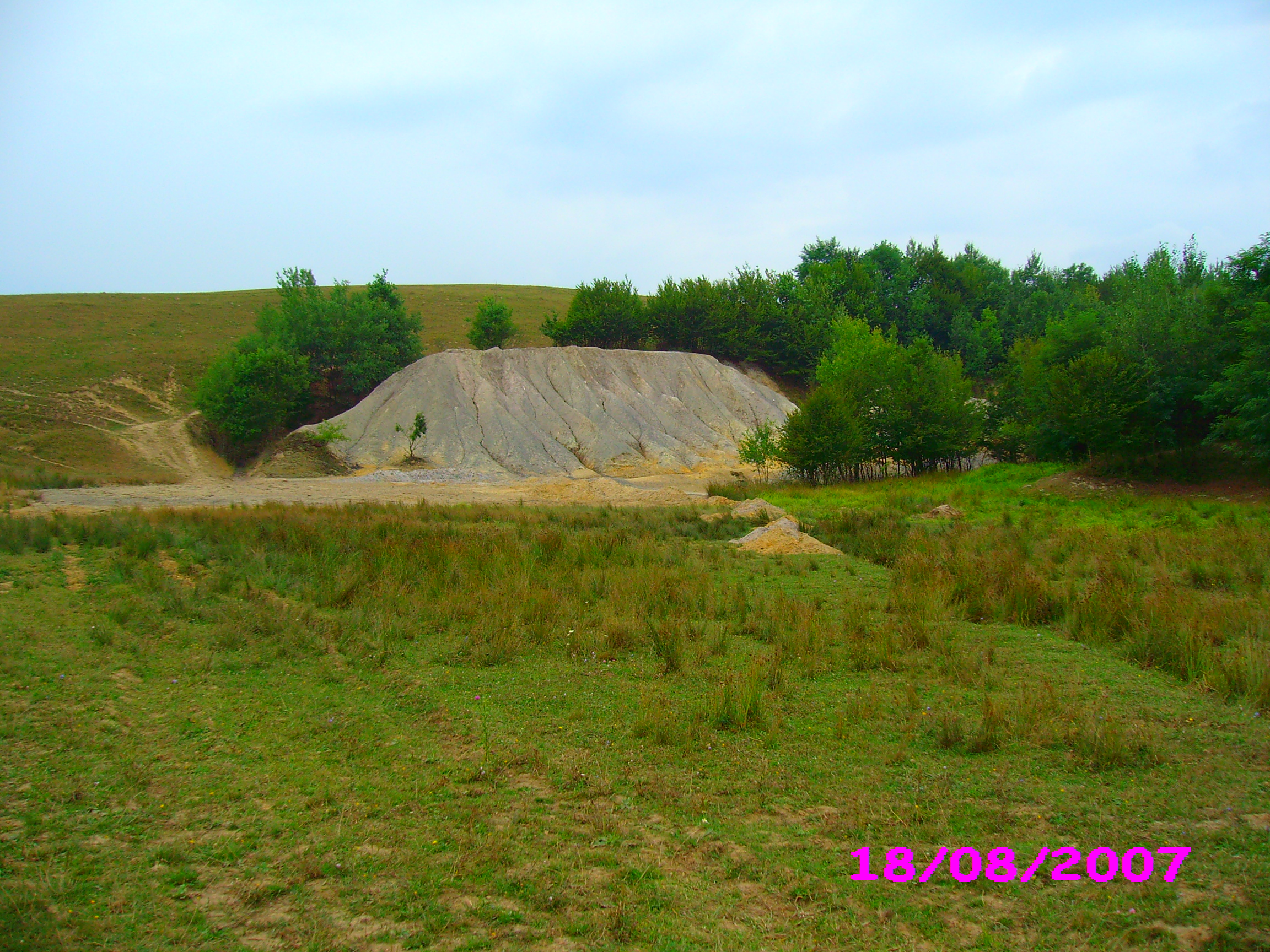
Old mine in Jac
