= Buciumi, Sălaj =

Buciumi
- Commune
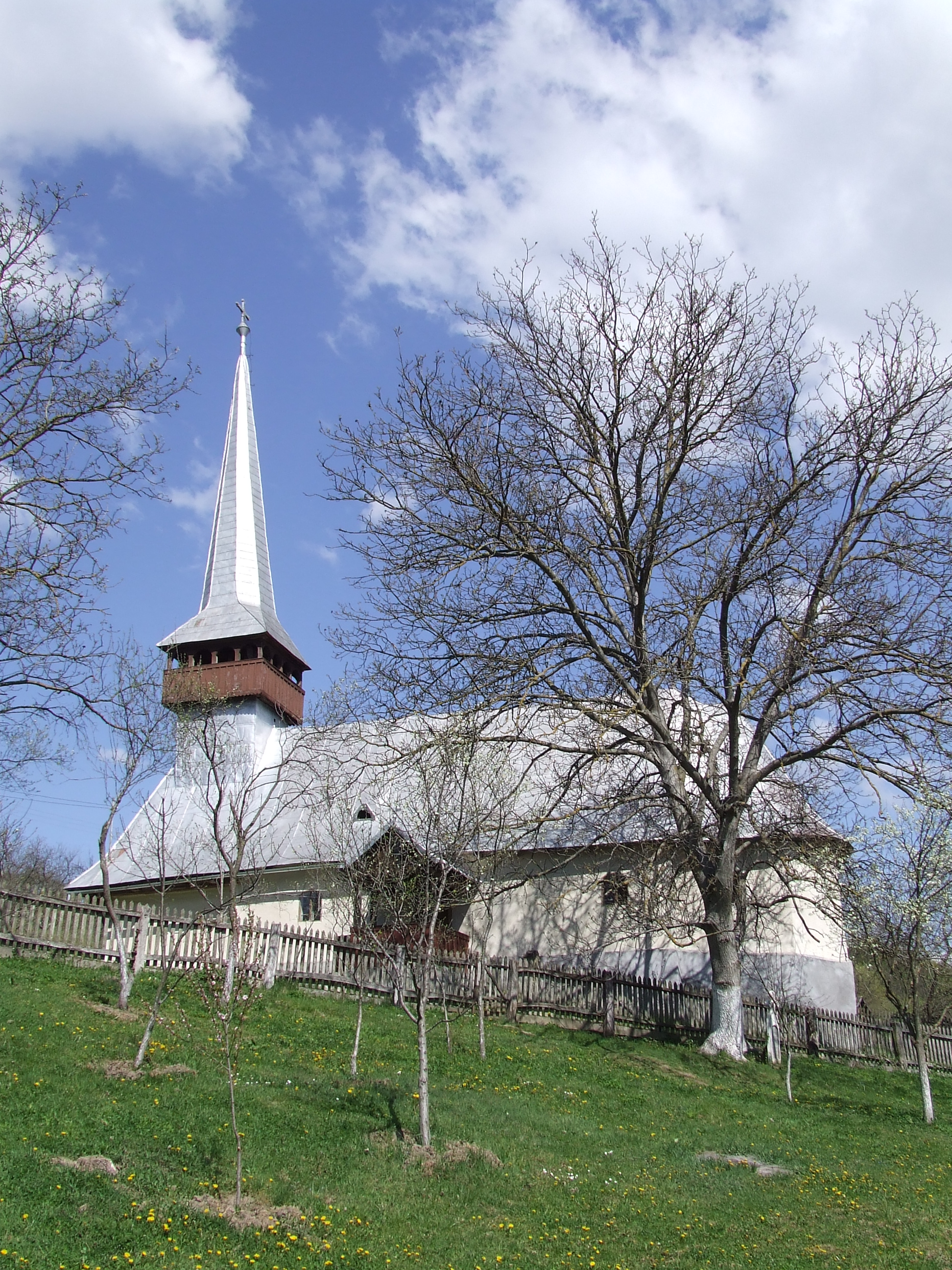
- Wooden church in Răstolț

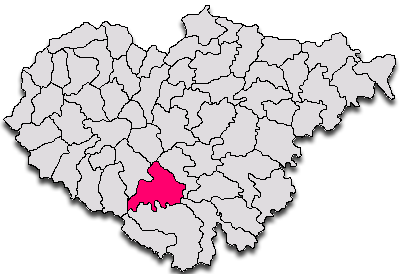
- Location in Sălaj County

- Location in Romania
- Coordinates: 47°02′40″N 23°02′54″E
- Country: Romania
- County: Sălaj

Government
  - Mayor (2020–2024): Ioan-Eugen Lazar (PSD)
- Area: 96.35 km^{2} (37.20 sq mi)
- Elevation: 336 m (1,102 ft)
- Population (2021-12-01): 2,402
  - Density: 24.93/km^{2} (64.57/sq mi)
- Time zone: UTC+02:00 (EET)
  - Summer (DST): UTC+03:00 (EEST)
- Postal code: 457050
- Area code: +(40) x59
- Vehicle reg.: SJ
- Website: comunabuciumi.ro

Buciumi (Hungarian: Vármező) is a commune located in Sălaj County, Crișana, Romania. It is composed of six villages: Bodia (Szilágybogya), Bogdana (Kásapatak), Buciumi, Huta (Csákyújfalu), Răstolț (Nagyrajtolc), and Sângeorgiu de Meseș (Meszesszentgyörgy).

== See also ==
- Castra of Buciumi
