= Românași =

- Commune
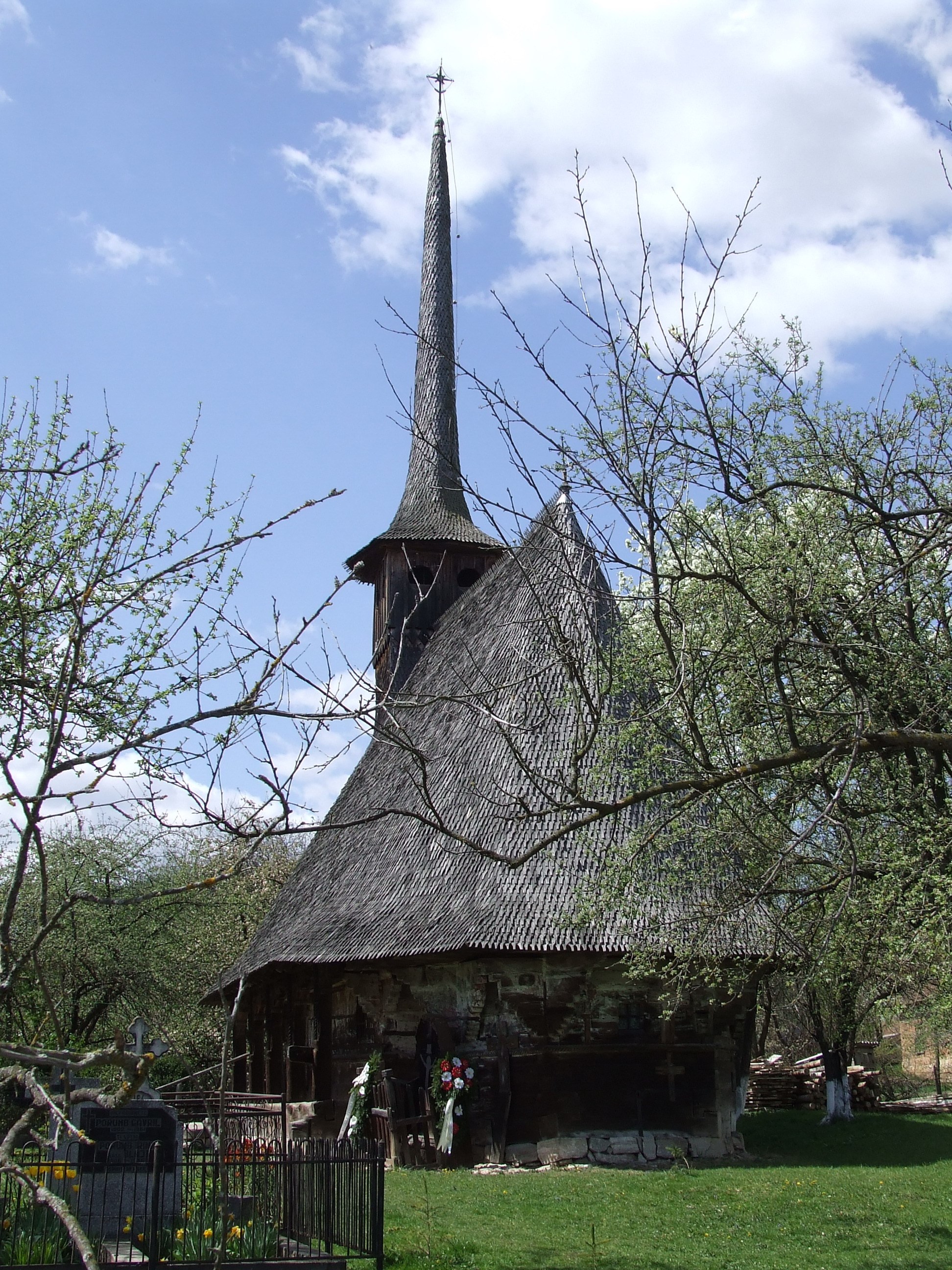
- Wooden church of Păușa

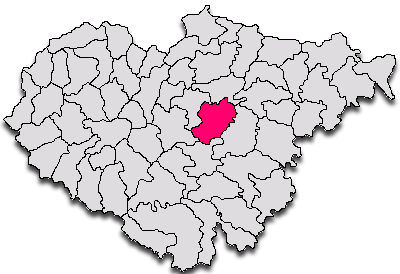
- Location in Sălaj County

- Location in Romania
- Coordinates: 47°06′41″N 23°11′01″E
- Country: Romania
- County: Sălaj

Government
  - Mayor (2020–2024): Ioan Buda (PNL)
- Area: 66.36 km^{2} (25.62 sq mi)
- Elevation: 247 m (810 ft)
- Population (2021-12-01): 3,118
  - Density: 46.99/km^{2} (121.7/sq mi)
- Time zone: UTC+02:00 (EET)
  - Summer (DST): UTC+03:00 (EEST)
- Postal code: 457280
- Area code: +(40) 260
- Vehicle reg.: SJ
- Website: primariaromanasi.ro

Românași (Hungarian: Alsóegregy) is a commune located in Sălaj County, Crișana, Romania. It is composed of six villages: Chichișa (Alsónyárló), Ciumărna (Csömörlő), Păușa (Egregypósa), Poarta Sălajului (Vaskapu), Românași, and Romita (Romlott).

== Sights ==
- Wooden church in Păușa (c.1738), historic monument
- Wooden church in Ciumărna (built in the 18th century), historic monument
- Wooden church in Chichișa (c.1739), historic monument
- Wooden church in Poarta Sălajului (built in the 17th century), historic monument
- Wooden church in Romita (built in the 18th century), historic monument
- Castra Certinae of Romita
- Castra Largina of Românași
