= Cristolțel =

- Location within Romania

Location
- Country: Romania
- Counties: Sălaj County
- Villages: Cristolț, Cristolțel

Physical characteristics
- Mouth: Solona
  - location: near Surduc
  - coordinates: 47.2563°N 23.3674°E
- Length: 11 km (6.8 mi)
- Basin size: 27 km^{2} (10 sq mi)

Basin features
- Progression: Solona→ Someș→ Tisza→ Danube→ Black Sea

The Cristolțel is a left tributary of the river Solona in Romania. It discharges into the Solona near Surduc. Its length is 11 km (6.8 mi) and its basin size is 27 km^{2} (10 sq mi).
