= Solona (Someș) =

- Location within Romania

Location
- Country: Romania
- Counties: Sălaj County
- Villages: Văleni, Teștioara, Solona, Surduc

Physical characteristics
- Mouth: Someș
  - location: Surduc
  - coordinates: 47.2605°N 23.3347°E
- Length: 18 km (11 mi)
- Basin size: 60 km^{2} (23 sq mi)

Basin features
- Progression: Someș→ Tisza→ Danube→ Black Sea
- Tributaries
  - left: Cristolțel

The Solona is a left tributary of the river Someș in Romania. It discharges into the Someș in Surduc. Its length is 18 km (11 mi) and its basin size is 60 km^{2} (23 sq mi).
