= Jósika Castle =

- Castelul Jósika (Romanian); Jósika kastély (Hungarian)
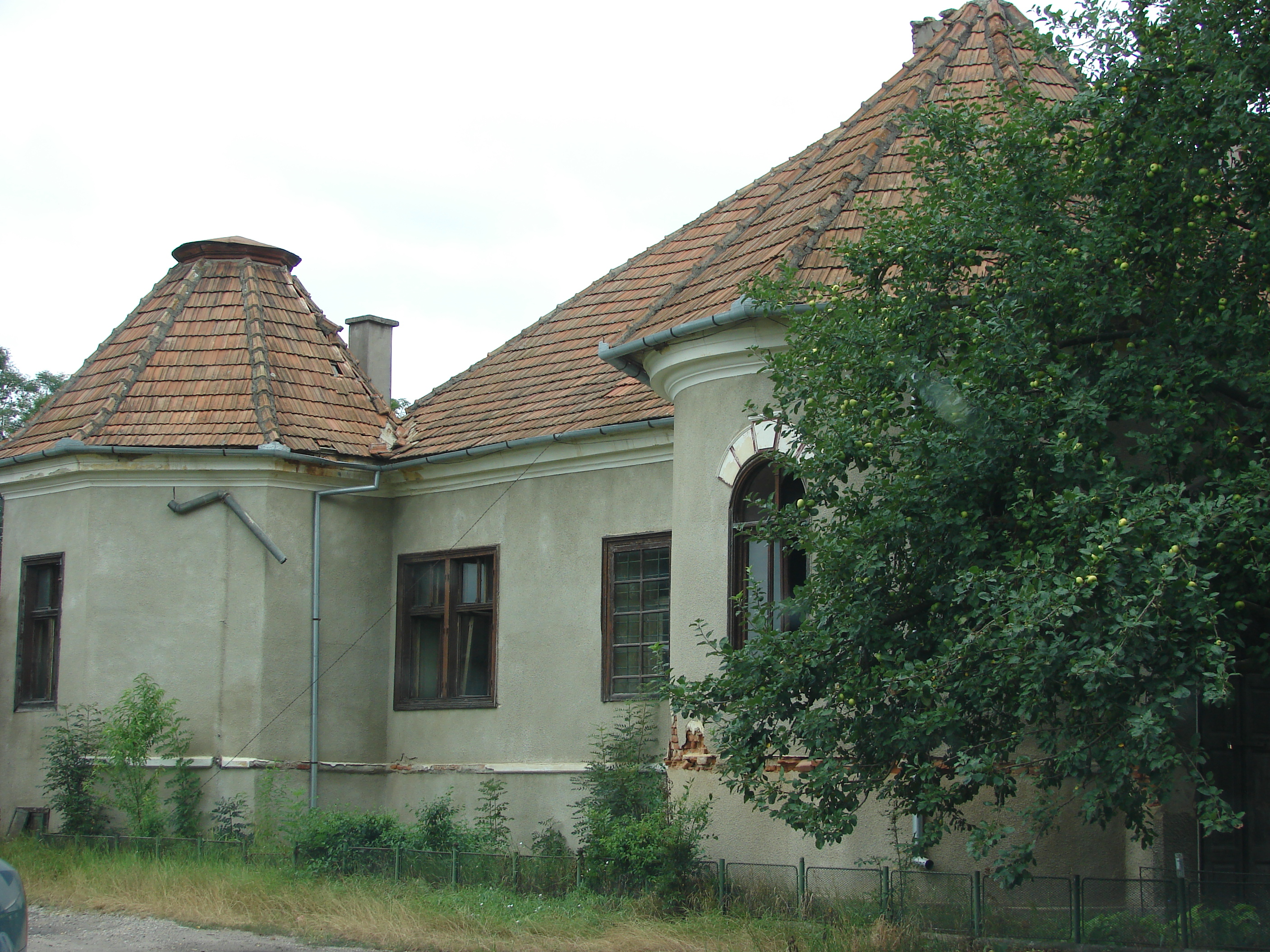
- Interactive map of the Jósika Castle area

General information
- Architectural style: Classical
- Location: Surduc, Sălaj County, Romania
- Coordinates: 47°15′21″N 23°20′28″E
- Owner: Csáky of Körösszeg and Adorján (1641–1810); Jósika of Branyicska (1810–1945); Agromec (1991–present)

Technical details
- Floor area: 3,596 m^{2} (38,710 sq ft)

Design and construction
- Other designers: Josef Schmelzer (sculptor); Antal Holtzman (ceramist)

The Jósika estate in Surduc, a village in Sălaj County, Romania, consists of a low-rise castle on the left bank of Someș River and a tempietto built on a steep cliff at the entrance from Jibou into the village. Here lived and worked between 1834 and 1853 writer Miklós Jósika, founder of the Hungarian romantic novel. Between the walls of the castle, he wrote the historical novel Abafi, his style being likened to Scottish writer Walter Scott. Members of the Jósika family, originating in the north of the current Hunedoara County, contributed significantly to the erection and final appearance of the castle. It is important from a historical perspective, because here Prince of Transylvania Francis II Rákóczi served a last lunch with László Csáky before the battle of Zsibó (present-day Jibou) of 15 November 1705, lost to the Austrian imperial army led by General Ludwig von Herbeville.

The castle is included in the list of historical monuments elaborated by the Ministry of Culture, as a monument of local importance.

== History ==
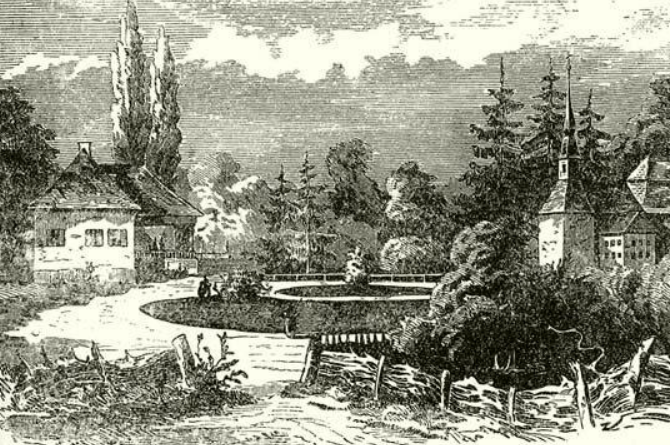
The castle and the park around 1880

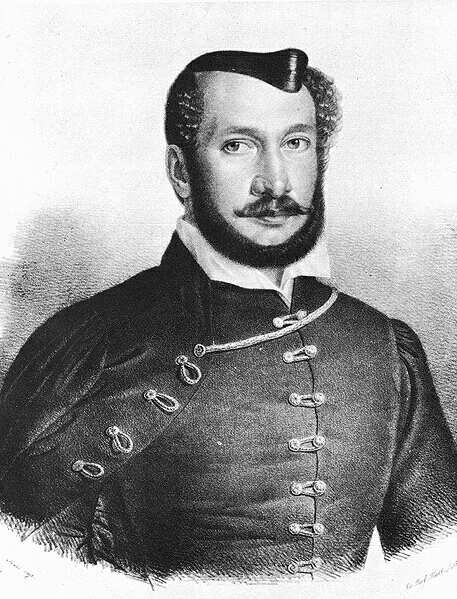
Miklós Jósika (1794–1865) lived in the castle in the 20s and 30s of the 19th century.

In the 17th century, Surduc, and hence the curia, were the property of the Csáky family. From their curia built in the middle of a park has not been preserved but the servants' house. The curia was turned into castle probably in the 18th century, because in the early 19th century the building is already registered as a castle. In 1810 it became the property of the Jósika family. After his first failed marriage to Erzsébet Kállay from Nagykálló (Hungary), writer Miklós Jósika (1794–1865) retreated to this castle. Miklós' maternal grandmother was a descendant of the Csáky family. He built several farm buildings here, including a stud farm, and revitalized the estate. The castle was later inherited by Miklos' son Leó (1827–1887), who left the castle to his daughter, Baroness Irén Jósika (1853–1940).

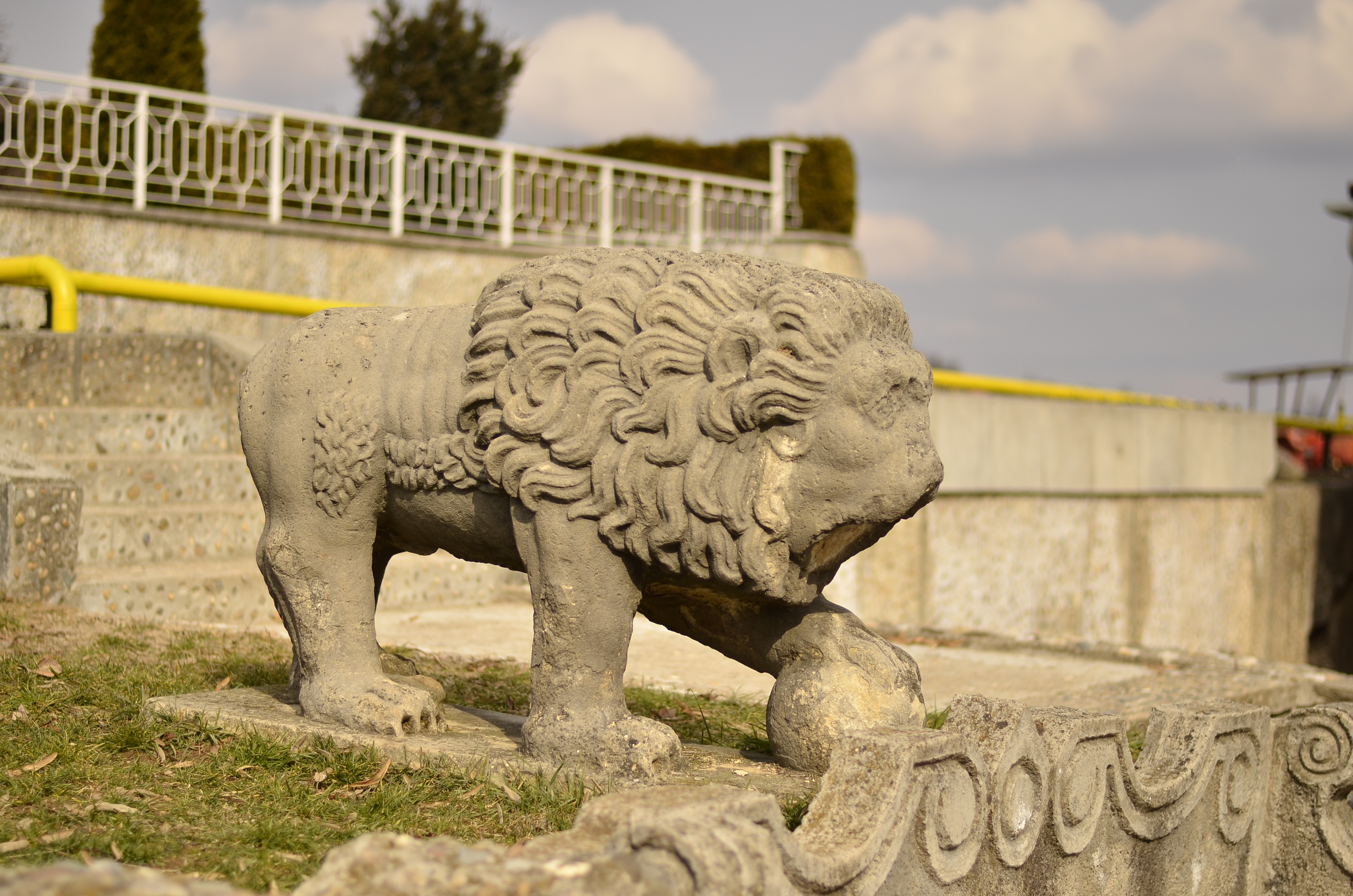
The stone lions of Jósika Castle in the Jibou Botanical Garden

A family property inventory from 1854 records a building consisting of 17 rooms, including the writer's office, and a chapel. Legend has it was built with stone from the nearby Roman castra of Tihău. The castle had a park where subsequently were found several fountains and a statue of Maria Theresa. The entrance to the castle was guarded by two stone lions, moved in the late 1970s to the garden of Wesselényi Castle in Jibou. On the main alley, there is a baroque church, and the main salon of the castle was full of remarkable pictures. The pieces of furniture were hand-carved, and the chandeliers surprised by elegance and refinement. Although Miklós Jósika was the first nobleman in Transylvania to emancipate his serfs (primarily Romanians) "from all lordly debts, labor, and tithes"—even before the Hungarian Diet enacted such a law—Romanian insurgents still joined Captain Binder's Austrian forces in December 1848 and destroyed his castle in Surduc. As a result, further reconstruction was necessary in the 1880s. Similarly, the tomb of his father and other relatives was looted, and their bones were scattered.

The establishment of the communist regime in Romania led to the transformation of the castle into a station for mechanization of agriculture (SMA). Many valuable pieces have disappeared or were destroyed during this period. Its old ornate gate was replaced by a bulky concrete frame, while the former park was transformed into a vegetable garden. At present, the castle, together with the related land, belongs to the Agromec company, founded in 1991. Since the heirs did not seek the return of the castle, it was listed for sale in 2022 by Sotheby's International Realty at a price of 560,000 euros.

=== Jósika family's crypt ===
The crypt, a tempietto-like structure known locally as the "baron's crypt", was built in 1825, in memory of Miklós Jósika's father who died a year before. On the facade can be read Parenti optimo pietas proculium posuit ano. MDCCCXXVII-mo, an inscription executed in 1828 by Friedrich Hirschfeld, a sculptor from Debrecen. Initially, in the now empty and looted crypt, there were three cast iron coffins, two of them with windows.

== Architecture ==
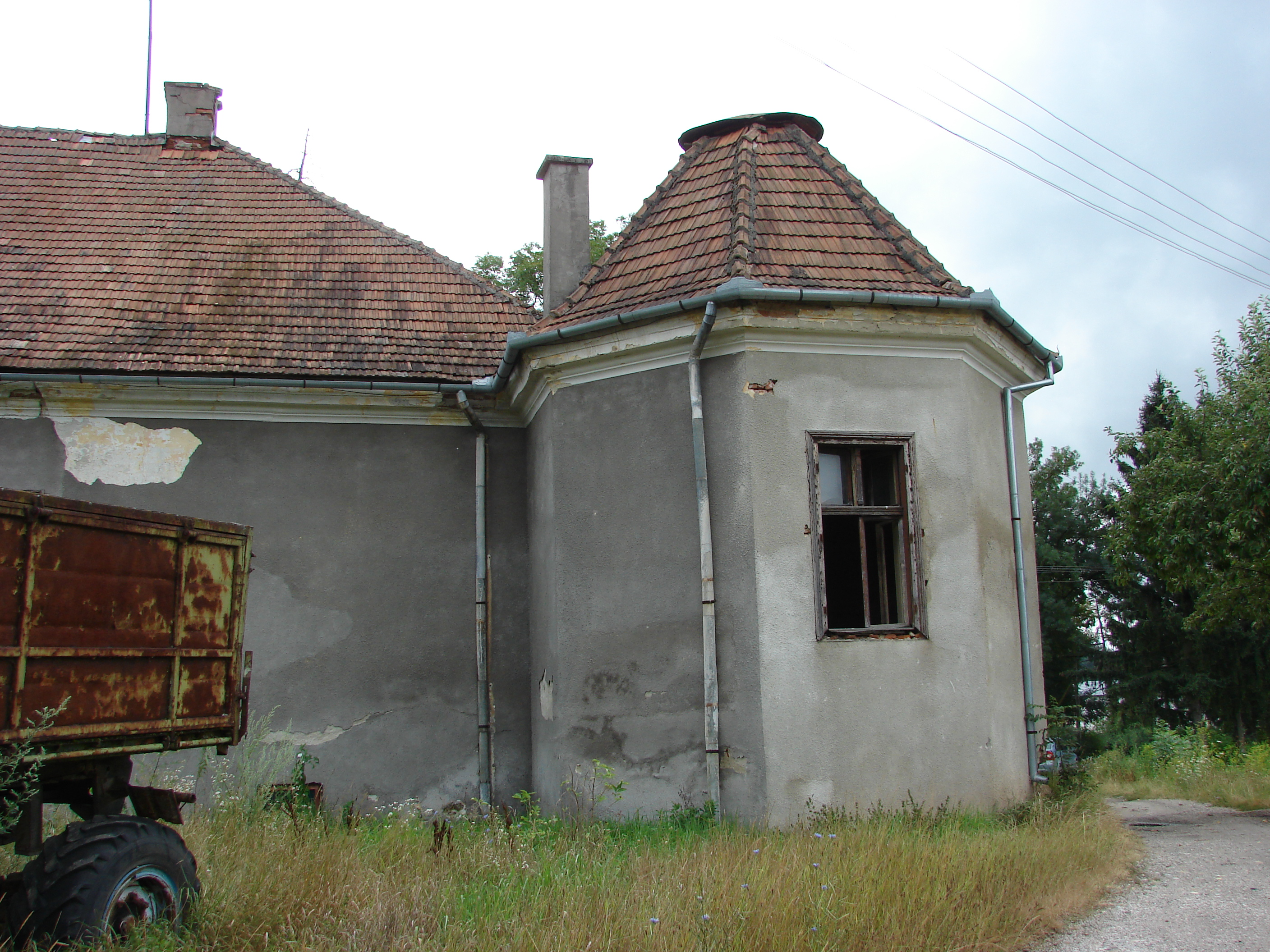
Miklós Jósika's study was located in this octagonal tower.

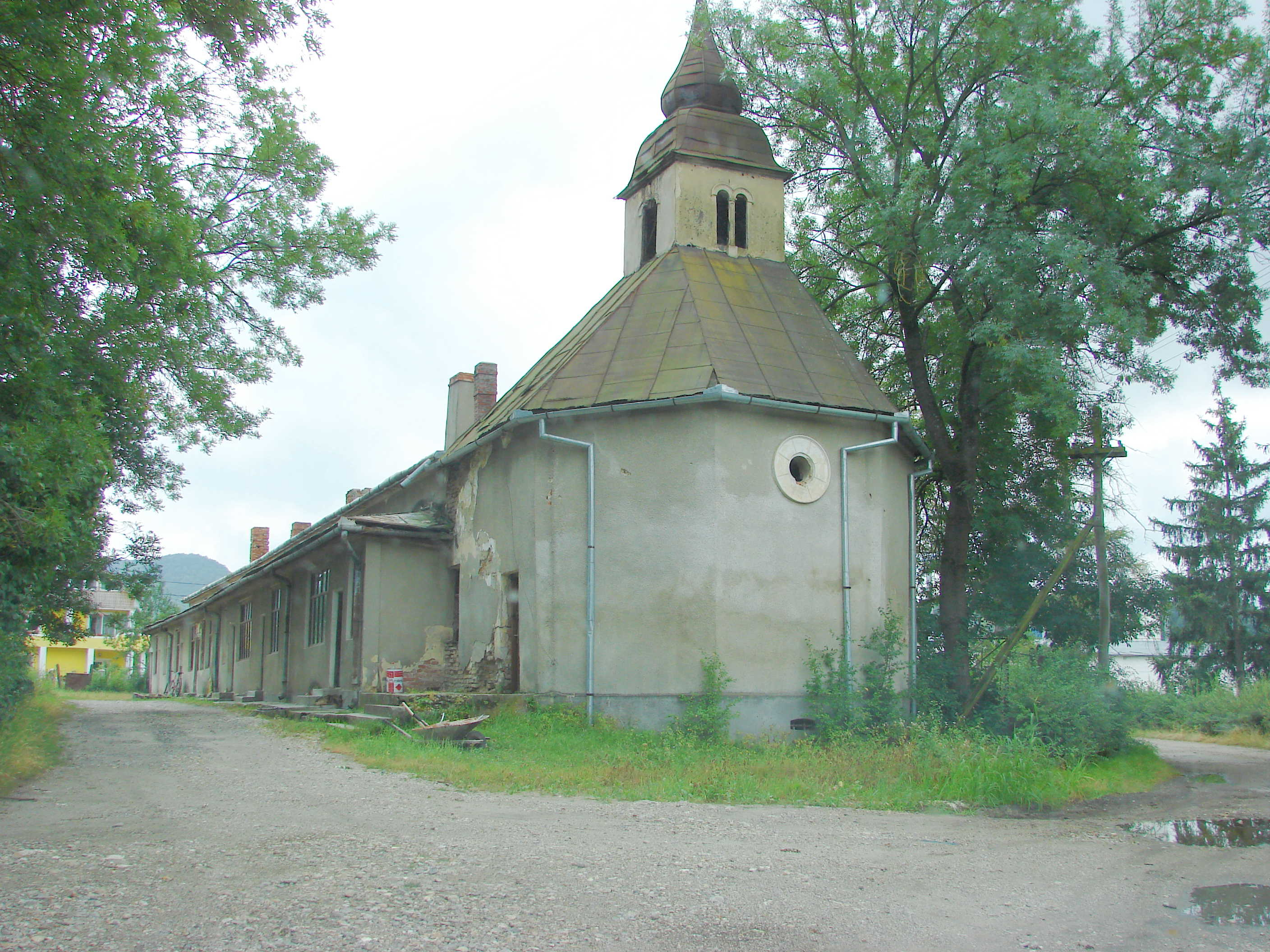
The chapel

The relatively small building, with a Prussian barrel vault and a basement, consists of two blocks connected in a Z shape. At the corners of the western façade stand two towers—one with an octagonal plan and the other circular. The circular tower features an entrance adorned with an ornate wrought-iron canopy, leading to a stone spiral staircase with a wrought-iron railing that ascends to the mezzanine level. The open terrace that once connected the bastions was later removed.

The semicircular door and the two semicircular windows with an opening to the main façade have been preserved. Above them are simple frames. The rear and side faades of the building are simple, without ornaments. The rear façade of the castle forms the letter U, one wing being shorter and narrower than the other. Some parts of the building are the result of later construction.

Within the castle, notable features include the stucco-decorated ceiling of the northwestern corner tower and the ornately framed wooden plaque set into the sitting niche by the entrance door. The locations of the former stoves are now marked only by semicircular niches. The castle's once exceptionally rich library, family portrait gallery, and the memorabilia and albums of Miklós Jósika were destroyed in October 1944.
