= Brâglez =

Brâglez Gârbou
- Location within Romania

Location
- Country: Romania
- Counties: Sălaj County
- Villages: Popteleac, Gârbou, Fabrica, Brâglez

Physical characteristics
- Mouth: Someș
  - location: Surduc
  - coordinates: 47.2474°N 23.3321°E
- Length: 25 km (16 mi)
- Basin size: 113 km^{2} (44 sq mi)

Basin features
- Progression: Someș→ Tisza→ Danube→ Black Sea
- Tributaries
  - left: Titireag
  - right: Cernuc, Bezded

The Brâglez (also: Gârbou) is a left tributary of the river Someș in Romania. It flows through the village Gârbou and discharges into the Someș in Surduc. Its length is 25 km (16 mi) and its basin size is 113 km^{2} (44 sq mi).
