= Vasile Pușcaș =

Romanian politician (born 1952)

Vasile Puşcaş
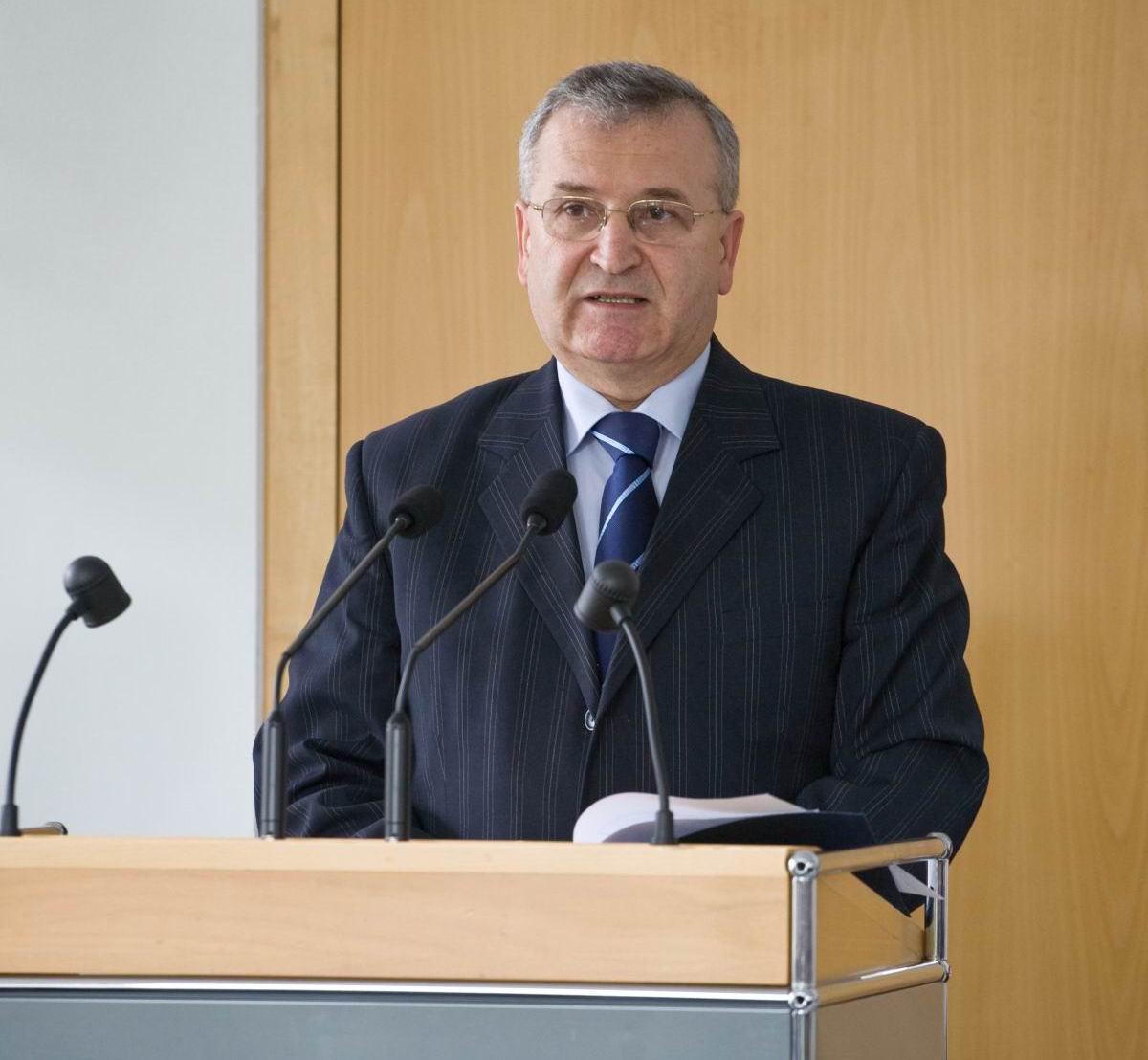
- Vasile Pușcaș in 2009.
- Born: 8 July 1952; Surduc, Sălaj County, Romania
- Citizenship: Romania
- Education: University of Cluj
- Known for: Political activity
- Scientific career
- Fields: Politics, History, Pedagogy
- Workplaces: University of Cluj, European Parliament, Romanian Parliament, University of Bucharest
- Doctoral advisor: yes
- Doctoral students: yes

Vasile Pușcaș (born 8 July 1952) is a Romanian historian, diplomat and professor of international relations. He is a corresponding member of the Romanian Academy and a professor at Babeș-Bolyai University in Cluj-Napoca. He served as Romania's chief negotiator for accession to the European Union from 2000 to 2004 and later served as Minister for European Affairs. He was also a member of the Romanian Chamber of Deputies and briefly served as a Member of the European Parliament in 2007.

== Early life and education ==
Pușcaș was born in Surduc, Sălaj County, Romania, on 8 July 1952. He graduated in history and social sciences from Babeș-Bolyai University in Cluj-Napoca in 1976 and received a doctorate in history from the same university in 1991. He also received a Fulbright grant in 1990.

His academic interests have included contemporary history, international relations, European integration and negotiations, Central and Eastern Europe, and conflict management.

== Academic career ==
Pușcaș began his academic career at Babeș-Bolyai University in 1979. He subsequently served as a lecturer and associate professor before becoming a professor in 1995. He also held administrative positions at the university, including vice-dean and dean.

He directed the Center for Democracy and Post-Communist Studies and later founded and directed the university's Institute of International Studies. He also served as director of the Institute of Political Science and International Relations (Romanian Academy, Bucharest) from 2002 to 2007, and of the Institute of European Research (Cluj-Napoca) from 2013 to 2017.

From 2000 to 2014, Pușcaș was associated with the International University Institute for European Studies in Gorizia and the University of Trieste as a professor and doctoral supervisor in international relations. In 2011 he became a Jean Monnet Ad Personam Chair at Babeș-Bolyai University.

He worked as a senior researcher at the Institute of Political Science and International Relations of the Romanian Academy and later at the George Barițiu Institute of History in Cluj-Napoca.

In 2021, Pușcaș was elected a corresponding member of the Romanian Academy in the Section of Historical Sciences and Archaeology.

In 2025, he was elected a member of Academia Europaea in its History and Archaeology section.

== Diplomatic career ==
Pușcaș began his diplomatic career in the early 1990s. From 1991 to 1992 he served as director of the Romanian Cultural Center in New York. He subsequently served at the Romanian Embassy in Washington, D.C., including as Deputy Chief of Mission and Acting Ambassador.

During his diplomatic work in the United States, he was involved in Romanian-American relations during the period surrounding the restoration of Romania's Most-Favoured-Nation trading status. His later academic research examined the negotiations surrounding the status and the role of the United States Congress.

His 2015 study in Studia Universitatis Babeș-Bolyai. Studia Europaea examined the political and policy environment surrounding the regranting of Most-Favoured-Nation status to Romania in 1993.

== European Union accession negotiations ==
Pușcaș served as Romania's Chief nNgotiator for accession to the European Union from 2000 to 2004. He represented Romania in the accession negotiations and coordinated aspects of the Romanian negotiating process.

European Parliament records from the accession period identify Pușcaș as Romania's chief negotiator and document his participation in discussions concerning Romania's accession to the European Union.

During the negotiations, he addressed issues relating to the EU acquis and Romania's preparation for membership. Contemporary European reporting also covered his role and statements concerning the progress of the negotiations.

The accession negotiations were completed in December 2004. Romania subsequently signed its Treaty of Accession in 2005 and became a member of the European Union on 1 January 2007.

Pușcaș later published works examining the accession process. His European Negotiations: A Case Study: Romanian Accession to the European Union was published in 2006 and examines European negotiations in the context of Romania's accession.

His Romania towards the European Union: Accession Negotiations (2000–2004) was published in 2007 and focuses on the accession negotiations. The work received the Romanian Academy's Mihail Kogălniceanu Prize in 2009.

== Public career ==
Pușcaș was elected to the Romanian Chamber of Deputies in 2000 and served until 2008. He represented the Social Democratic Party and participated in parliamentary work concerning foreign policy and European integration.

In 2007 he became a Member of the European Parliament. His mandate ran from February to April 2007, during which he was affiliated with the Group of the Party of European Socialists.

In December 2008, Pușcaș became Minister for European Affairs in the Romanian government. He held the position until October 2009.

From 2016 to 2019, he served on a presidential commission concerned with preparing a national development project.

== Research and publications ==
Pușcaș has published on contemporary history, international relations, European integration and international negotiations. His work includes monographs, edited volumes, studies and articles concerning Romania, Central and Eastern Europe and European integration.

Among his books are Alma Mater Napocensis: The Ideal of the Modern University (1994), World War II: Transylvania and European Arrangements, 1940–1944 (1995), The Pulse of History in Central Europe (1998), Romania's Fall in the Balkans (2000), International/Transnational Relations (2005), European Negotiations: A Case Study: The Romania's Accession to EU (2006), and Romania towards the European Union: Accession Negotiations (2000–2004) (2007).

He also authored "Sticks and Carrots": Regranting the Most-Favored-Nation Status for Romania (US Congress, 1990–1996), concerning Romanian-American relations and the restoration of the United States' most-favoured-nation status for Romania.

Pușcaș edited and coordinated academic volumes dealing with international studies, European integration, regionalization and the history of higher education.

His later publications include Negotiations for Partnerships (2016), Romania and the European Way of Life (2017), Iuliu Maniu Seen by American-Romanians (2018), The Ribbentrop-Ciano Diktat: Transylvania and the Romanian-Hungarian Relations (1940–1944), Keith Hitchins: The Historian's Honesty (2021), Românii în Uniunea Europeană (2022), România și lumea în schimbare (2023), and MAGNA CIVITAS-The Worlds of our World (2025).

== Academic and professional affiliations ==
Pușcaș has been associated with the Romanian Academy, Academia Europaea, the Society of Romanian Historians, the Romanian Society of European Law, the Institute for Cultural Diplomacy in Berlin, the European Institute of Romania and the International University Institute for European Studies in Gorizia.

He has also participated in scientific and advisory activities involving research institutes and academic publications concerned with international relations, European studies and contemporary history.

== Awards and distinctions ==
Pușcaș received the National Order of the Star of Romania in the rank of Knight in 2002.

He was named Diplomat of the Year by Nine O'Clock in 2004 and received a special prize from TVR International in 2007 for his contribution to Romania's European integration.

In 2008, he received the Comenius Prize from Babeș-Bolyai University. In 2009, he received the Romanian Academy's Mihail Kogălniceanu Prize for Romania towards the European Union: Accession Negotiations (2000–2004).

In 2010 he received distinctions including the Romanian Academy's Excellence Diploma for research in contemporary history and Babeș-Bolyai University's Excellence Prize for History.

In 2015, he received the title of Doctor Honoris Causa from the University of Oradea. In 2016, he received the Nicolae Titulescu Prize for diplomacy and political science.

He received further distinctions in the following years, including an excellence award related to Romania's EU accession negotiations in 2018 and academic and cultural awards in the early 2020s.

== Selected bibliography ==
=== Books as author ===
- Dr. Petru Groza: Pentru o "lume nouă" (1985)
- Alma Mater Napocensis: Idealul universității moderne (1994)
- World War II: Transylvania and European Arrangements, 1940–1944 (1995)
- The Pulse of History in Central Europe (1998)
- Contemporary International Relations (1999)
- Romania's Fall in the Balkans (2000)
- International/Transnational Relations (2005)
- "Sticks and Carrots": Regranting the Most-Favored-Nation Status for Romania (2006)
- European Negotiations: A Case Study: The Romania's Accession to EU (2006)
- Romania towards the European Union: Accession Negotiations (2000–2004) (2007)
- Romania and the European Union: Post-Lisbon Treaty (2010)
- EU Accession Negotiations: A Handbook (2013)
- Negotiations for Partnerships (2016)
- Romania and the European Way of Life (2017)
- Iuliu Maniu Seen by American-Romanians (2018)
- Keith Hitchins: The Historian's Honesty (2021)
- Românii în Uniunea Europeană (2022)
- România și lumea în schimbare (2023)
- MAGNA CIVITAS-The Worlds of our World (2025)

=== Edited and coordinated volumes ===
Pușcaș has also edited or coordinated volumes including Central Europe Since 1989 (2001), International Studies at the Beginning of the 21st Century (2002), Region and Regionalization in the European Union (2004), University and Society: A History of the Cluj Higher Education in the 20th Century (1999), and Trianon, Trianon: A Century of Revisionist Political Mythology (2020–2021).
