= Castra of Tihău =

Roman fort in Dacia

- Castra of Surduc
- Location within Romania
- 47.242396°N 23.335183°E
- Location: Grădiște, Tihău, Sălaj, Romania

History
- Founded: 2nd century AD

Site notes
- Elevation: 221 m (725 ft)
- Excavation dates: 1958; 1994
- Archaeologists: Mihail Macrea; Dumitru Protase
- Condition: Ruined

The castra of Tihău is a historically significant fort in the Roman province of Dacia. Since the 18th century, it has been referred to as the "citadel of Tuhutum". Ruins on the plateau "Grădiște" shows that the Castra of Tihău was a Roman fort of auxiliary troop, pertaining to the northwest sector of Limes Porolissensis.

Its garrison was Cohors I Cananefatium.

Repeated discoveries of Roman archaeological materials (pottery, tiles and bricks, arms, tools, diverse objects, tegular stamps, coins, even stone inscriptions etc.), advanced knowledges in the realm of history and archeology of Roman Dacia. These discoveries confirm the nature, the chronological placement, appurtenance and the Roman military-defensive role of "fort" that formerly erected in this place from the confluence of Almaș and Someș River.

The castra was known and put on contribution in the debate of various military issues of Roman Dacia. However, these facts are based only on a few fortuitous discoveries and some land surface observations of the site.

== Excavations ==
The first systematic excavations, that were actually limited to only information surveys, were taken in 1958, within the pale of the archaeological site of Porolissum. A large group of researchers, led by regretted professor Mihail Macrea performed the work. With his commission and modest funds provided by the Museum of Zalău, they began the excavations at the castra. These excavations were envisioned to be unfold for several years and would receive a greater ampleness. Unfortunately, the excavations were confined to 1958, limited to the resources available, and were resumed. Excavations from Porolissum were stopped the following year due to the reasons of deformed and arbitrary historical photics. After 36 years, through a collaboration between the Institute of Archaeology and Art History in Cluj-Napoca and Museum of History and Art in Zalău, the researches resumed and continued the work.

== Geographical and strategical position ==
The castra is located on a plateau called by villagers "Grădiște" or "Cetate". The plateau is placed to the left of Someș River, before its confluence with Almaș River and at about 120 m in the left of Jibou-Dej road. From the plateau, whose plots belonged to Tihău inhabitants (commune of Surduc), it opens a wide view over the valley of Someș River to Jibou, 8 km westwards, to the village of Ciocmani, northwards, and southwards, on the valley of Almaș River, to the village of Gâlgău Almașului. Only eastwards the perspective closes by nearby hills, that stretch along the valley of Gârbou River and to the namesake village. It's a nodal strategic point, excellently chosen for a Roman castra on the frontier of Dacia Porolissensis (additional province organized in 124 AD), that blocked the main pathways of a potential external attack to the northwestern Roman Dacia territories. Actually, westwards, horizon is far closed, beyond Jibou, to the hills in Popteleac-Mirșid-Creaca-Moigrad (Porolissum) area.

== See also ==
- List of castra
