= Cohors I Cananefatium =

Cohors I Cananefatium quingenaria peditata
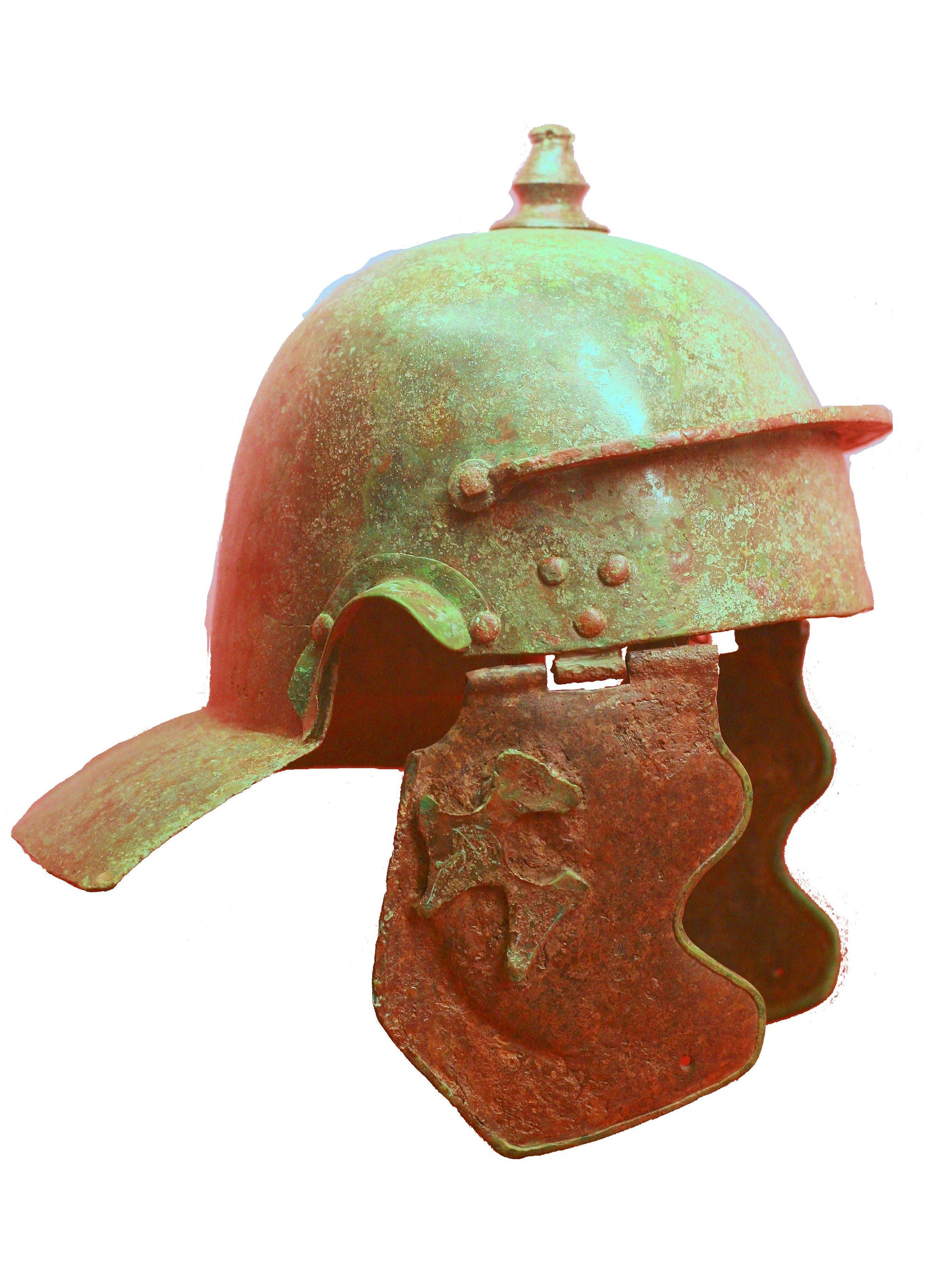
- Roman infantry helmet (late 1st century)
- Active: ?
- Country: Roman Empire
- Type: Roman auxiliary cohort
- Role: infantry
- Size: 480 men (480 infantry)

Cohors [prima] Cananefatium [quingenaria peditata] ("[1st infantry 500 strong] cohort of Cananefates") was a Roman auxiliary infantry regiment. The cohort stationed in Dacia at castra of Tihău.

== See also ==
- List of Roman auxiliary regiments
