= Gârbou =

- Commune
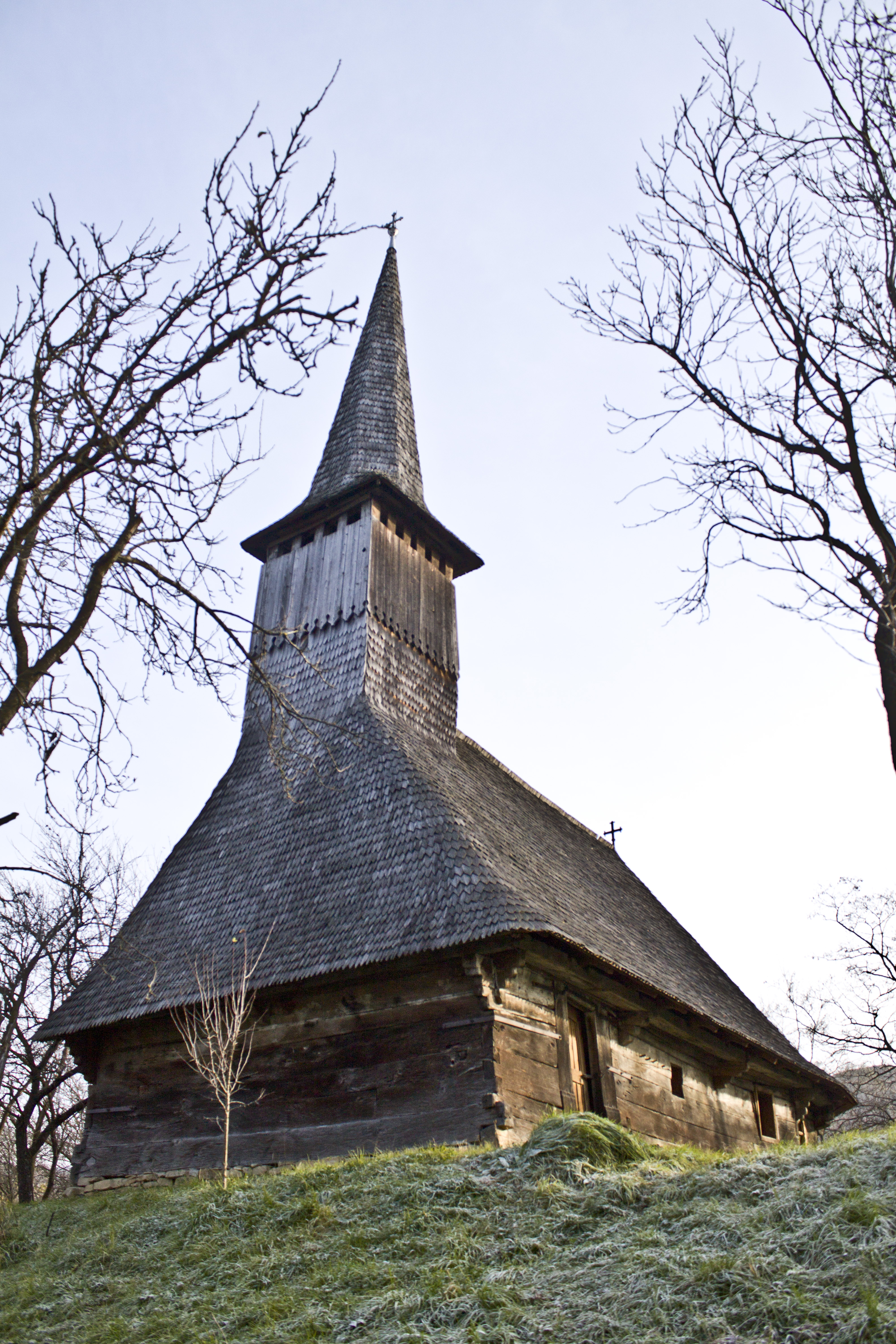
- Wooden church in Solomon

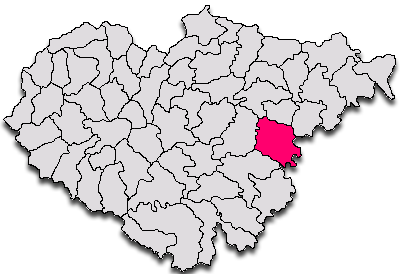
- Location in Sălaj County

- Location in Romania
- Coordinates: 47°09′37″N 23°25′04″E
- Country: Romania
- County: Sălaj

Government
  - Mayor (2020–2024): Alexandru Spătar (Ind.)
- Area: 100.62 km^{2} (38.85 sq mi)
- Elevation: 275 m (902 ft)
- Population (2021-12-01): 1,758
  - Density: 17.47/km^{2} (45.25/sq mi)
- Time zone: UTC+02:00 (EET)
  - Summer (DST): UTC+03:00 (EEST)
- Postal code: 457150
- Area code: +(40) 0260
- Vehicle reg.: SJ
- Website: comunagarbou.ro

Gârbou (Hungarian: Csákigorbó) is a commune located in Sălaj County, Transylvania, Romania. It is composed of seven villages: Bezded (Bezdédtelek), Călacea (Kiskalocsa), Cernuc (Csernek), Fabrica (Cukorgyártelep), Gârbou, Popteleac (Paptelke), and Solomon (Gorbósalamon).

== Location ==
The commune is located in the eastern part of Sălaj County, 42 km (26 mi) from the county seat, Zalău, on the border with Cluj County. It is situated at an altitude of 275 m (902 ft), on the banks of the river Brâglez. Gârbou is crossed by county road DJ108B, which connects it to Surduc, 13 km (8 mi) to the northwest and to Dej, 43 km (27 mi) to the east.

== Demographics ==
Historical population
Year	Pop.	±%
1850	3,559	—
1880	4,066	+14.2%
1900	4,949	+21.7%
1910	5,309	+7.3%
1930	5,053	−4.8%
1941	5,764	+14.1%
1956	5,590	−3.0%
1966	5,034	−9.9%
1977	4,185	−16.9%
1992	2,937	−29.8%
2002	2,439	−17.0%
2011	2,044	−16.2%
2021	1,758	−14.0%
Source: Census data

At the 2021 census, the commune had a population of 1,758; of those, 86.29% were Romanians and 6.26% Roma.

== Natives ==
- Alexandru Papiu Ilarian (1827 – 1877), revolutionary, lawyer, and historian
- Zoltán Vadász (1926 – 1989), actor

== Sights ==
- The Wooden church in Solomon, built in the 18th century, historic monument
- The ruins of the Haller Castle in Gârbou, built in the 18th century are a historic monument. Today, only the road to the castle survives, shaded by the crowns of large chestnut trees, the stone arched entrance with the family crest, and the ruins of the Catholic chapel.
