= Surduc =

- Commune
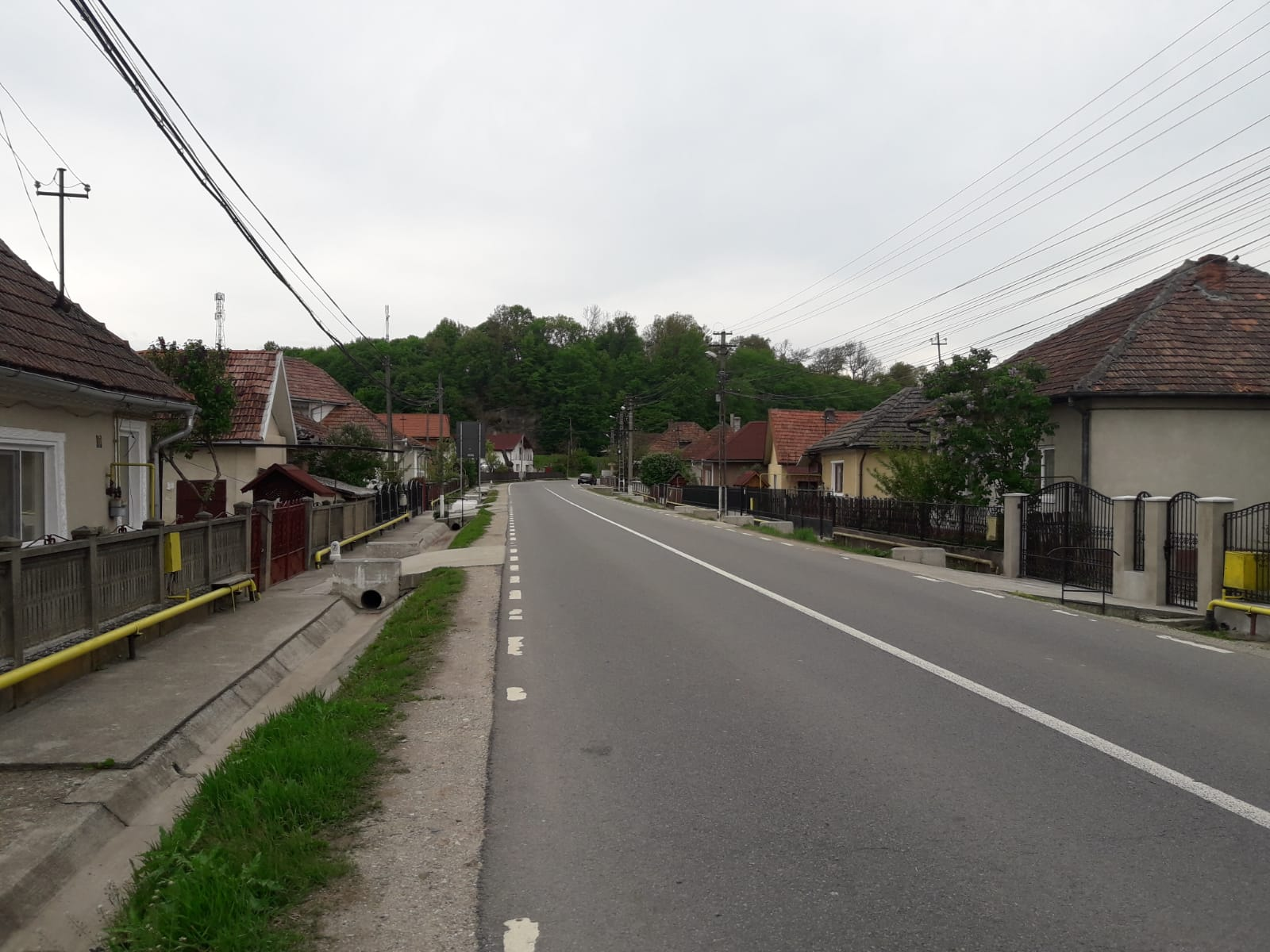

- Location in Sălaj County

- Location in Romania
- Coordinates: 47°15′18″N 23°20′52″E
- Country: Romania
- County: Sălaj
- Established: 1320 (Sumbur)

Government
  - Mayor (2024–2028): Alin Marian Suciu (PSD)
- Area: 71.42 km^{2} (27.58 sq mi)
- Elevation: 607 m (1,991 ft)
- Population (2021-12-01): 3,337
  - Density: 46.72/km^{2} (121.0/sq mi)
- Time zone: UTC+02:00 (EET)
  - Summer (DST): UTC+03:00 (EEST)
- Postal code: 457315
- Area code: +(40) 0260
- Vehicle reg.: SJ
- Website: www.primariasurduc.ro

Surduc (Hungarian: Szurduk; German: Surdecken; Yiddish: סורדוק) is a commune in Sălaj County, Transylvania, Romania. It is composed of seven villages: Brâglez, Cristolțel, Solona, Surduc, Teștioara, Tihău, and Turbuța.

== Etymology ==
The name of the commune has its origin in the morphological configuration of the area (surduc means gorge, pass or narrow valley with sudden and steep slopes). Other sources claim that the name of the commune is of Slavic origin, surdec meaning meander; near Surduc, Someș River makes the biggest turn in its course. According to a local legend, between Bălan and Solona (the oldest villages in the area) there were no settlements but only an inn, in the place called Sub grădiște (Under the hillock), owned by a short and deaf man (in Romanian surd means deaf). The travelers nicknamed him "surduc", hence the name.

== History ==
Plan of the castra of Tihău

Southeast of Surduc, on a hill known as Grădiște or Cetate, a Roman fort was discovered on a plateau overlooking the expansive Someș Plain at its confluence with the Almaș River. The initial earth-and-timber phase of the fort was constructed in 106 AD by a vexillation of the Legio XIII Gemina. A later stone phase was built by the Cohors I Cananefatium. The site has not undergone systematic archaeological investigation, with only limited surveys conducted in 1958 and 1997. The corners of the fort are aligned with the cardinal directions. The porta praetoria was located on the northwest side, facing the Someș River. Due to the current state of research, the precise location of the vicus remains unknown.

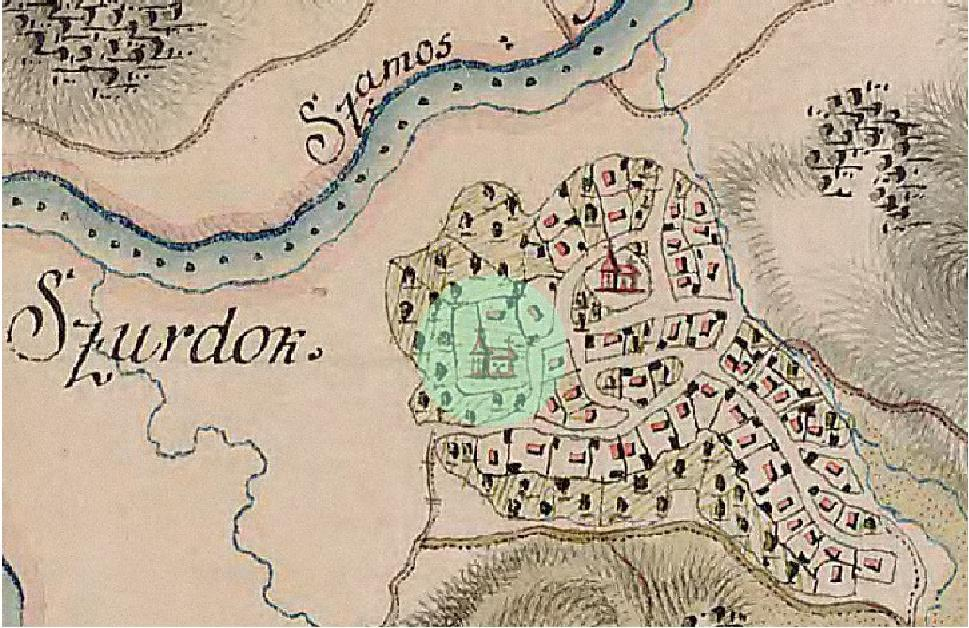
Surduc in the Josephinische Landesaufnahme (1769–1773), with the castle and chapel marked

Surduc is probably the successor of an older settlement, recorded as Sumbur in 1320. According to József Kádár's Monograph of Szolnok-Doboka County, Surduc was first mentioned in 1554 as Naghzwrdok ("Great Surduc"), when Anna Somi, Imre Balassa's widow, bequeathed a quarter of the estate to her husband, Boldizsár Patócsi. The village originally belonged to the nobles of Csákigorbó (present-day Gârbou), being part of the domain of the Almaș Fortress. In the Middle Ages and pre-modern times it was part of the Szolnok-Doboka County and Inner Szolnok County. By 1696, Surduc appears as a village under Turkish occupation.

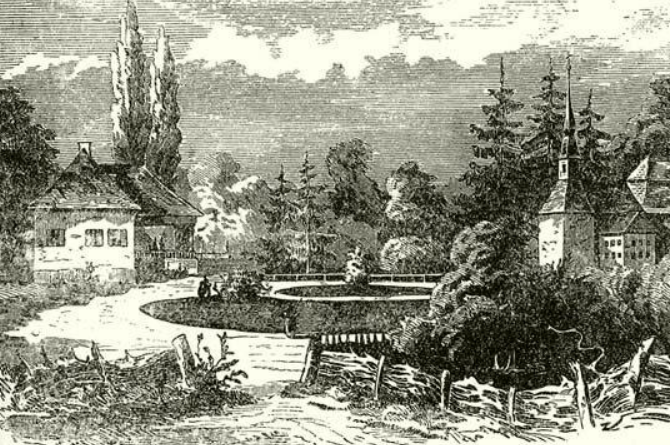
Jósika Castle in the 19th century. Writer Miklós Jósika, the founder of the Hungarian romantic novel, lived and worked here until 1853.

Between 1641 and 1810 the estate was owned by the Csáky family. By 1644 they had a noble curia here; only its servants' house is preserved to this day. In 1705 it hosted Prince Francis II Rákóczi, before the confrontation of his troops with the Habsburg Imperial Army led by Ludwig von Herbeville in Zsibó (present-day Jibou). The curia was probably transformed into a castle in the 18th century, because at the beginning of the 19th century it was already recorded as a castle.

In 1810 the village became the property of the Jósika family of Branyicska. The best known owner is the novelist Miklós Jósika (1794–1865), nicknamed "Hungarian Walter Scott", who settles here after his first wife's divorce. He revitalizes the area, building a series of agricultural buildings, a chapel and probably establishing the current form of the castle. A family property inventory from 1854 records a 17-room building, including the novelist's office and a chapel. The castle and the village were almost completely destroyed in December 1848, during the Hungarian Revolution of 1848, when the Austrians under Captain Binder occupied the village with thousands of insurgents. As the leader of the Hungarian liberal nobility, Jósika was the first landowner in Doboka County to free the serfs from the Surduc estate and their villages on 23 April 1848, two months before the Hungarian Diet. János, the final landowner of the Jósika family's Surduc estate and prefect of Sălaj County following the Vienna Dictate, was expropriated on 28 May 1945. The communist regime turned the castle into a tractor repair station, and after 1991 it was bought by Agromec. Currently, the castle is overgrown with vegetation, in an advanced state of degradation.

== Geography ==
=== Relief ===
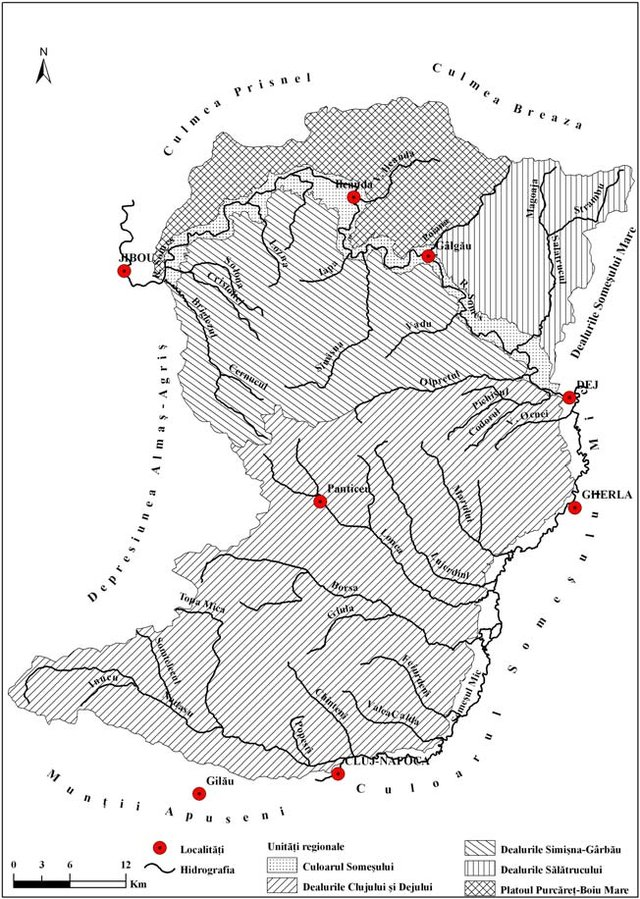
The limits and subdivisions of the Someș Plateau

With an area of 71.42 km^{2} (6th among the county communes), Surduc occupies a central-eastern position within Sălaj County, at the contact of four important relief units: Someș Corridor, Șimișna–Gârbou Hills, Almaș–Agrij Depression and Prisnel Peak. The commune is located to the east of the "intracarpathian yoke" (Meseș Mountains–Dumbrava Hill–Prisnel Peak). The Șimișna–Gârbou Hills that make up most of the commune are represented only by their northern termination, which gradually inclines in this direction towards the wide terraced corridor of the Someș, to which the Almaș–Agrij Depression also opens. The corridor is limited to the west by the last extensions of the Prisnel Peak, represented by the Rona Peak (438 m).

The relief is very varied, formed by an association of hilly peaks and valleys between slopes, all resulting from the fragmentation of the northwestern part of the Someș Plateau. In terms of altitude, the relief is between about 200 m in the meadows of Someș and its tributaries and 607 m in Pietrosu Peak, in the southeastern part of the commune.

The relief energy reaches significant values, ranging from 200–300 m and even up to 400 m compared to the surrounding depressions, which partly accounts for the intensity of slope-related processes. The valleys exhibit considerable vertical incision, largely influenced by the geological structure, consisting of layers of sandstone, clay, marl, sand, conglomerates, and other materials. This vertical deepening is accompanied by active torrential erosion, which is mitigated or stabilized to some extent by the degree of forest cover.

=== Hydrography ===
The hydrographic network is relatively young in age. The territory of the commune is crossed by the middle course of the Someș, as well as three smaller tributaries of it: Valea Cristolțelului (Solonii), Valea Brâglezului (Gârboului) and Valea Almașului. The main hydrological characteristics of the tributaries of the Someș are given by their inclusion in the type of Transylvanian pericarpathian hydrological regime, with large spring waters, almost annual frequency (85–90%) and summer floods. The average density of the river network (taking into account the length of temporary valleys) is 0.39 km/km^{2}.

=== Flora and fauna ===
The fragmented plateau relief and the climate allowed the development of a predominantly forest vegetation, in which the Turkey oak and the Hungarian oak predominate. In the distribution of the floristic elements there is a weak vertical zonation, in the sense that the forested surfaces (beech, oak and mixed forests) are interspersed with secondary and derived grasslands or with agricultural lands.

In the forest floor there is a great diversity of animal species, from the evolved ones (mammals) to the smallest invertebrates. Among the larger mammals, some of which are of hunting interest, are: wolves, foxes, deers, badgers, rabbits, etc. Rodent mammals are represented by wood mouses, squirrels and edible dormice. The avifauna is very varied and represented by: tits, jays, blackbirds, nightingales, woodpeckers, orioles, sparrowhawks, kites, crows, ravens, magpies, etc. Among the reptiles are common species such as slowworm, green lizard and common frog. The aquatic fauna is represented, especially in Valea Gârboului, by invertebrates (crustaceans, worms, mollusks, etc.), as well as by small fish.

The commune includes two protected natural sites: the middle course of the Someș (ROSPA0114) and Lozna (ROSCI0314).

=== Climate ===
Like all of Romania, Surduc exhibits a temperate continental climate. It is characterized by hot summers, with fairly abundant precipitation and relatively cold and wet winters, with frequent snowfalls, rare blizzards, but also heating periods that interrupt the continuity of the snow layer and repeated freeze-thaw cycles. The climate here is classified as Cfb by the Köppen-Geiger system. The temperature here averages 10 °C. With an average of 20.9 °C, August is the warmest month. January is the coldest month, with temperatures averaging –2.0 °C. In a year, the rainfall is 756 mm. The driest month is February. There is 45 mm of precipitation in February. Most of the precipitation here falls in June, averaging 89 mm.

Climate data for Surduc, Sălaj
Month	Jan	Feb	Mar	Apr	May	Jun	Jul	Aug	Sep	Oct	Nov	Dec	Year
Mean daily maximum °C (°F)	1.4 (34.5)	4.0 (39.2)	9.6 (49.3)	15.9 (60.6)	20.5 (68.9)	23.8 (74.8)	25.6 (78.1)	25.9 (78.6)	20.8 (69.4)	14.9 (58.8)	9.1 (48.4)	2.8 (37.0)	14.5 (58.1)
Daily mean °C (°F)	−2.0 (28.4)	−0.1 (31.8)	4.6 (40.3)	10.6 (51.1)	15.5 (59.9)	19.1 (66.4)	20.8 (69.4)	20.9 (69.6)	15.8 (60.4)	10.1 (50.2)	5.1 (41.2)	−0.3 (31.5)	10.0 (50.0)
Mean daily minimum °C (°F)	−5.2 (22.6)	−3.9 (25.0)	−0.4 (31.3)	4.8 (40.6)	9.6 (49.3)	13.4 (56.1)	15.4 (59.7)	15.4 (59.7)	10.9 (51.6)	5.8 (42.4)	1.7 (35.1)	−3.0 (26.6)	5.4 (41.7)
Average precipitation mm (inches)	48 (1.9)	45 (1.8)	56 (2.2)	64 (2.5)	76 (3.0)	89 (3.5)	82 (3.2)	60 (2.4)	68 (2.7)	59 (2.3)	53 (2.1)	56 (2.2)	756 (29.8)
Average precipitation days	7	8	8	8	9	9	8	7	7	7	7	8	93
Average relative humidity (%) (daily average)	81	78	71	66	68	68	68	65	69	75	79	82	73

== Demographics ==
Ethnic composition (2021)
1. Romanians (88.3%)
2. Roma (4.91%)
3. Unknown (6.53%)
4. Others (0.22%)
Religious composition (2021)
1. Orthodox (84.3%)
2. Pentecostals (2.75%)
3. Greek Catholics (2.27%)
4. Jehovah's Witnesses (1.73%)
5. Unknown (6.86%)
6. Others (1.99%)
7. Irreligious, atheists and agnostics (0.14%)

Census		Ethnic composition
Year	Population	Romanians	Hungarians	Germans	Jews	Roma
1850	2,646	2,423	61	5	46	70
1880	2,616	2,313	143	12
1890	2,920	2,630	208	38
1900	3,108	2,830	248	27
1910	3,841	3,371	396	56
1920	3,743	3,376	181	10	117
1930	4,707	4,091	312	15	134	105
1941	4,891	4,244	434	12	56	137
1956	5,671	5,553	117
1966	5,516	5,428	67	2		16
1977	4,805	4,734	28	2		39
1992	4,323	4,198	9		1	114
2002	4,026	3,908	11			106
2011	3,461	3,164	10			211
2021	3,337	2,948	4			164
Censuses in italics are based on mother tongue rather than ethnicity.

According to the 2021 census, the population of Surduc is 3,337, down 3.58% from the previous census in 2011, when 3,461 people were registered.

=== Ethnic groups ===
Historically, the chain of villages between Surduc and Ileanda was inhabited mostly by Romanians. As part of the Hungarian Empire, Surduc also saw waves of Hungarian immigrants. By 1910, the Hungarians represented 10% of the Surduc population; at present, their number has dropped to less than 1%. As of 2021, the largest ethnic group is that of the Roma – 164 or 4.91% of the commune's population. In the past, Surduc had a significant Jewish community – almost 3% in the 1930 census. Previously, by 1850, Surduc already had a minyan. A Jewish cemetery was also established here in the 19th century. In May 1944, the Jews were gathered in the Cehei ghetto, then in Șimleu Silvaniei and were deported to Auschwitz on 31 May, 6 and 8 June.

=== Religions ===
In terms of religion, most of the inhabitants are Orthodox (84.26%), but there are also minorities of Pentecostals (2.75%), Greek Catholics (2.27%) and Jehovah's Witnesses (1.73%). For 6.86% of the population, religious affiliation is not known. In the commune there are six Orthodox churches (Surduc, Tihău, Brâglez, Cristolțel, Solona and Turbuța), a Greek Catholic church (Tihău), three Pentecostal places of worship (Surduc, Tihău and Solona) and two Baptist places of worship (Surduc and Turbuța).

== Politics and administration ==
Surduc is administered by a mayor and a local council composed of 13 councilors. The mayor, Alin Suciu, from the Social Democratic Party, has been in office since 2024. After the 2024 local elections, the local council has the following composition by political parties:

Party	Seats	Current council
PSD	7	
PNL	6	

=== Component villages ===
Name in Romanian	Name in Hungarian	Name in German
Brâglez	Tótszállás	Slawenhaus
Cristolțel	Kiskeresztes	Kleinchristholz
Solona	Szalonnapatak	Speckdorf
Surduc	Szurduk	Surdecken
Teștioara	Kőszénbányatelep	Braunkohlebergwerk
Tihău	Tihó	Tichau
Turbuța	Turbóca	Turbholz

== Education ==
Surduc has a technological high school, resulting from the merger in 2009–2010 of the middle schools of Tihău, Cristolțel, Turbuța and Brâglez. The first mentions about the high school date from 1867 when Gavril Balmoș was a "traveling teacher" in Surduc and Solona. In 1894, with the contribution of the villagers, a private premises for the confessional school was built here. The building for the state school and kindergarten, both intended for education in Hungarian, was built in 1900. The state education in Romanian began in 1919, the first teacher being Teodor Panorariu. Following the Second Vienna Award, in 1940–1944, education was conducted in Hungarian. Romanian-language education resumed in 1944–1945. In 2015–2016 370 students were enrolled here. Besides this, in the commune there are four kindergartens (Surduc, Tihău, Brâglez and Cristolțel) and two elementary schools (Tihău and Turbuța).

== Healthcare ==
Surduc has a family medicine office, a dental office and a pharmacy.

== Economy ==
The commune used to have a more diverse economy, with a brick and tile factory, wood-processing, and slaughterhouses. Until after 1989, the commune's economy was supported by mining activities related to the exploitation of brown coal and gravel aggregates located in the meadows of Someș, Almaș and Brâglez rivers. In 1999, the Hida–Surduc–Jibou–Bălan mining area was declared, for a period of ten years, a disadvantaged area.

At present, the economic structure of the commune is dominated by the agricultural activities specific to the area, especially the cultivation of cereals, technical and fodder plants, and to a lesser extent of vines and fruit trees. However, industry, and not agriculture, ensures the added value of the area. In the commune, both the extractive and the processing industries have important traditions.

The commune is home to nearly 300 economic entities, with a combined annual turnover of approximately 43.9 million lei (around 10 million euros) and a total workforce of about 185 employees.

=== Industry ===
There are industrial branches represented by some small and medium enterprises:

- civil construction units: 2
- ore extraction and processing unit for the chemical industry: 1
- furniture production unit: 1

=== Agriculture ===
Agriculture is based on family-level production and takes place both in open field and vegetable gardens. Vegetable farming takes advantage of an area with a temperate climate and is thus varied and exclusively natural. Predominantly cultivated vegetable species are carrots, parsley, eggplants, onions, tomatoes, etc. Fruit growing and viticulture do not enjoy a controlled exploitation. Animal husbandry is a branch with potential, but unexploited. There are four milk collection/processing points.

=== Tourism ===
Brâglez

- Presentation of Christ Church, built between 1929 and 1930
- Michael's Cave, a small suspended abri which the locals call a cave, with an opening of 40–45 m, a height of 4–4.5 m and just as deep
- House of robbers (Pintea Viteazu Cave), a sandstone bank whose vertical erosion created a 50–60 cm-wide and 3 m-high cave

Cristolțel

- St. Nicholas Church, wall church built in 1933

Surduc

- Jósika Castle
- Crypt of the Jósika family. It was built in 1825 by Miklós Jósika in memory of his father.
- St. John the Baptist Church. It was built between 1911 and 1913 on the site of a towerless wooden church built in 1850.
- Jewish cemetery. The oldest known tomb dates from the 19th century.

Teștioara

- Abris of Poiana Teștiorii
- Tăul Iezer lake complex, with a rich lake vegetation

Tihău

- Roman castra. It is located on the left side of the Someș, on a plateau called Grădiște or Cetate.
- Heroes' Monument, erected in 1958, in memory of 15 soldiers who fell in October 1944
- School Museum, which includes pieces of archaeology, history and ethnography collected by local teacher Gheorghe Bot

Turbuța

- Wooden church. It was built around the 17th–18th centuries.
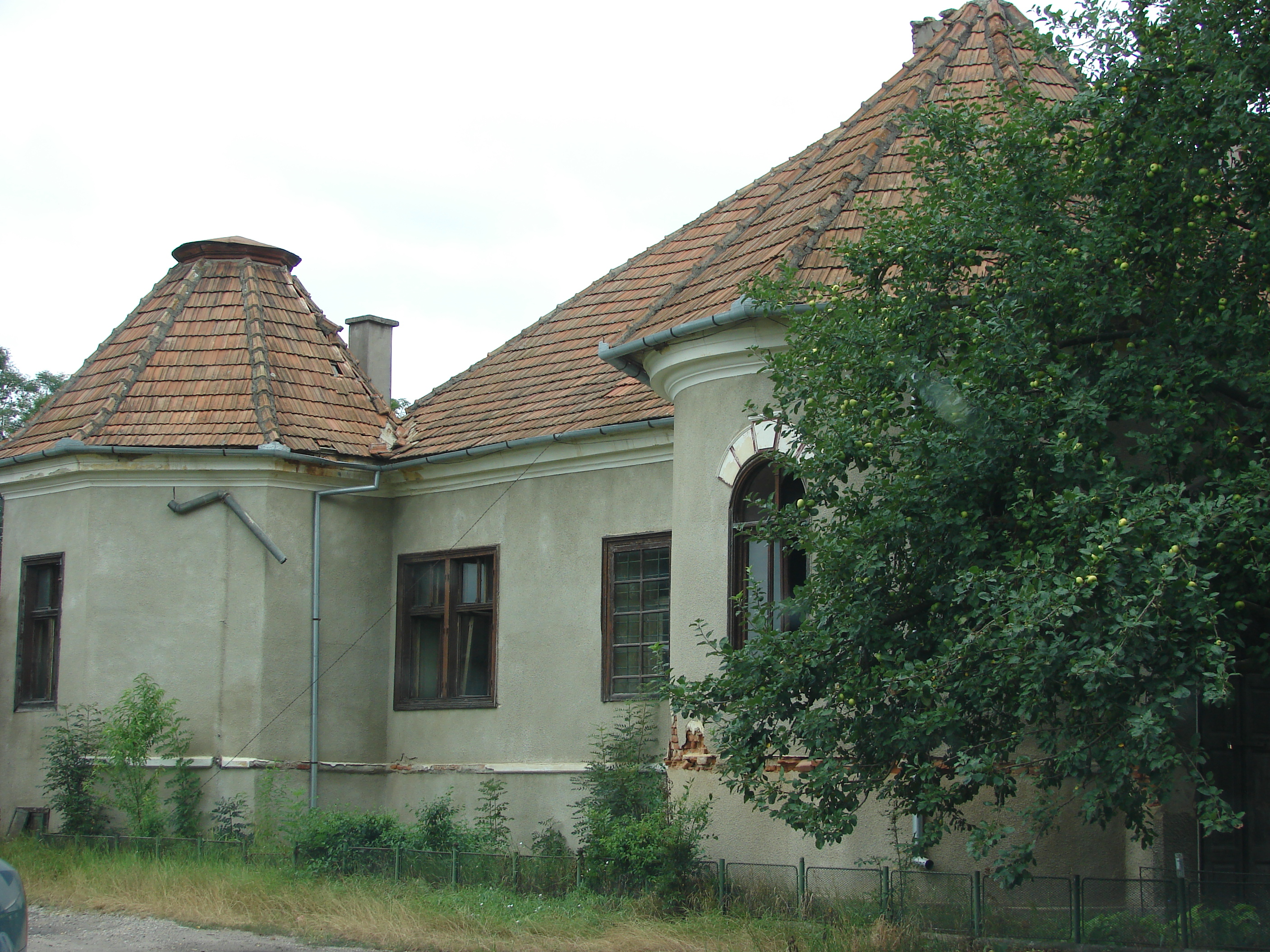
Jósika Castle in Surduc

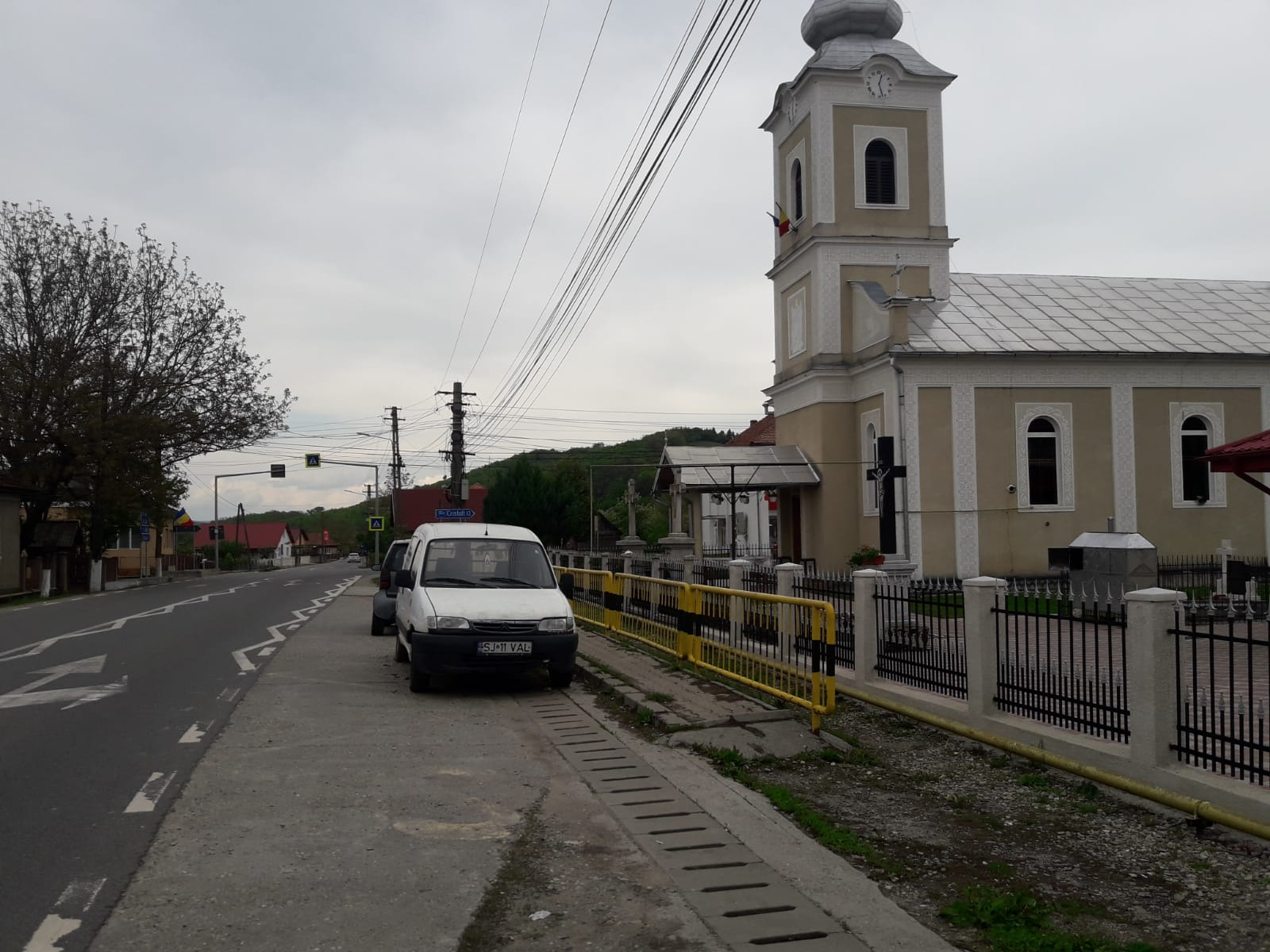
Orthodox church in Surduc

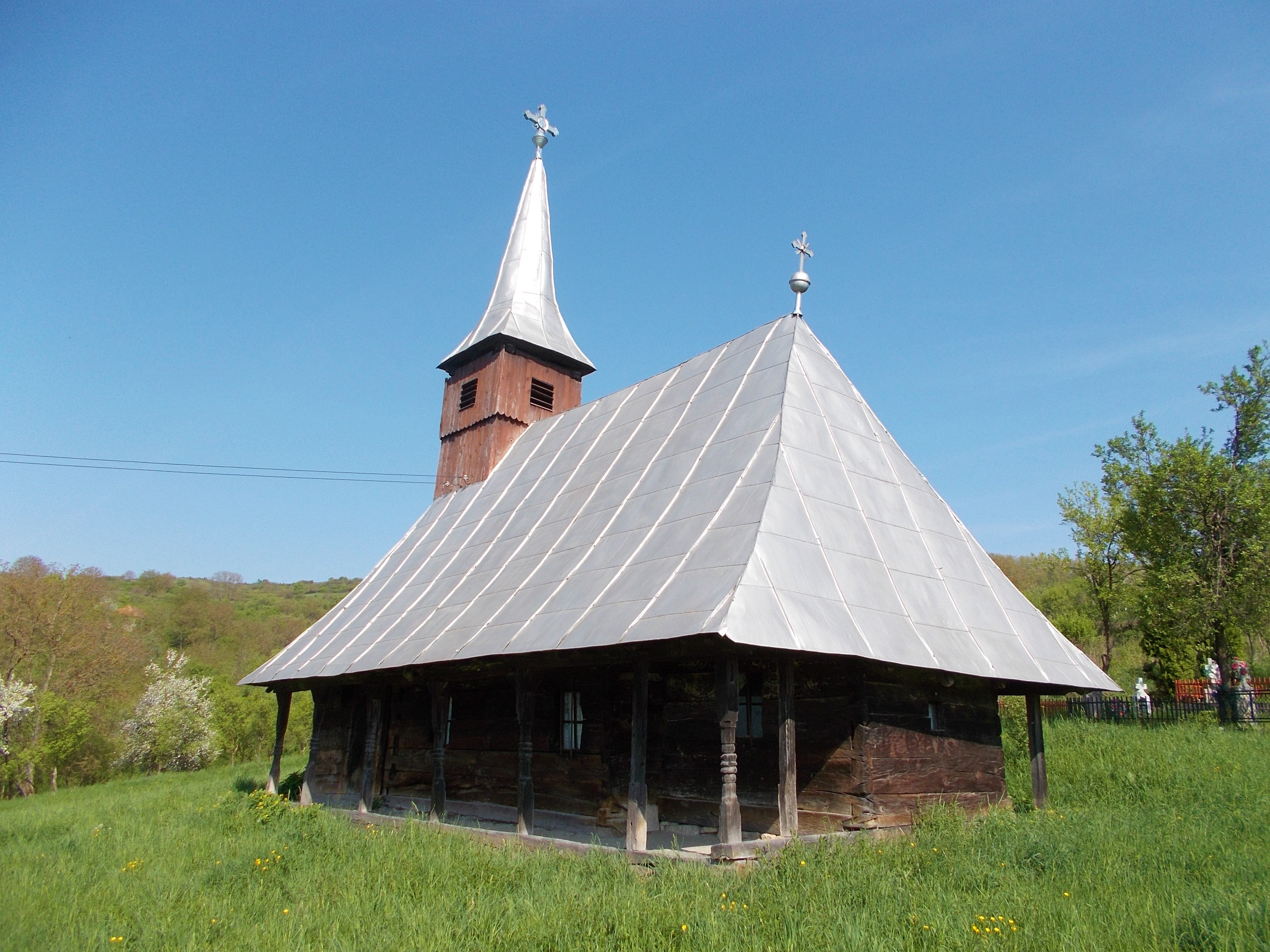
Wooden church in Turbuța

== Infrastructure ==
Surduc is crossed by the national roads DN1H and DN1G, as well as by 37.6 km of communal roads and 32.139 km of village roads. Surduc railway station is transited daily by five trains to Jibou, Cluj-Napoca and Baia Mare. Căile Ferate Române Line 400 passes through Surduc. The length of the railway in the commune is about 10 km. There was also an industrial railway of about 500 m that connected the Surduc station with the Surduc Mining Sector and the kaolin and quartz sand processing station.

The commune has 32 km of drinking water supply network (put into operation in 1994) and 16.2 km of natural gas supply network (put into operation in 1999). The commune does not have a sewerage network.

== Notable people ==
- Miklós Jósika (1794–1865), soldier, politician and writer
- Ion Maxim (1925–1980), poet
- Vasile Pușcaș (b. 1952), politician, diplomat and professor
- Viorel Mureșan (b. 1953), poet and essayist
- Călin Ioan Bot (b. 1970), Greek Catholic hierarch
