= Miklós Jósika =

Hungarian writer, politician (1794–1865)

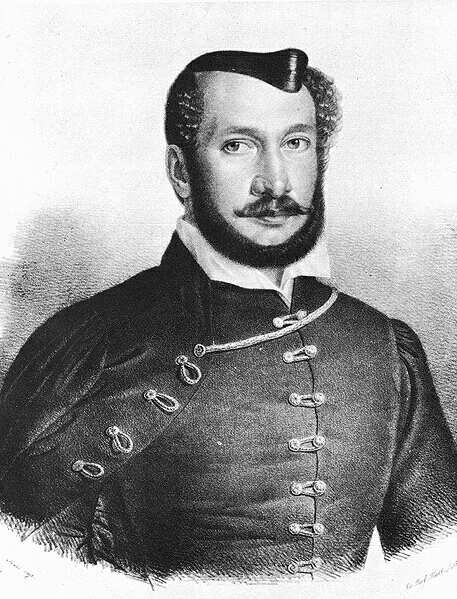
- Born: 28 April 1794; Torda, Kolozs County, Kingdom of Hungary (Transylvania), Habsburg Empire
- Died: 27 February 1865 (aged 70); Dresden, Kingdom of Saxony
- Resting place: Hazsongard cemetery, Cluj-Napoca, Romania
- Occupations: Soldier, writer, politician
- Notable work: Abafi (1836)
- Title: Baron of Branyicskai
- Spouses: Elizabeth Kállay (m. 1818; div. 1847) Júlia Podmaniczky (m. 1847)
- Family: Jósika de Branyicska

Miklós Jósika (pronounced [ˈmikloːʃ ˈjoːʒikɒ]; 28 April 1794 – 27 February 1865) was a Hungarian soldier, politician and writer. He is recognized as the first successful novelist in Hungarian literature, through the publishing of one of his first works, Abafi (1836), a historical novel set in his native Transylvania in the style of Romantic writers of the era such as Walter Scott.

His political writings and activities as a member of the Transylvanian and Hungarian Diets supported the union of Transylvania and Hungary, as well as the Hungarian Revolution of 1848. He joined the revolution's representative government and was elected to the National Defense Committee, which governed Hungary for seven months. Following the revolution's defeat in 1849, his family estate lands were seized and he went into exile for the remainder of his life, which ended in Dresden in 1865.

== Life ==
Miklós Jósika was born in 1794 in Turda, a town in Central Europe's Pannonian Basin, which was under Hungarian control at that time. He was the son of Baron Miklós Jósika and his wife Eleanor Lázár. Following the death of his mother in 1799, his paternal grandmother, Anna Bornemissza, oversaw his childhood. Despite living on the estate of a baron, Jósika spent most of his childhood by himself, alone. He was enrolled in a school in Kolozsvár run by the Piarists Fathers where he studied under the guidance of a multiethnic faculty. The most influential teacher in his life was the French colonel Leonir Dubignon d'Armand. Jósika graduated with a degree in law at Klausenburg, where he was also introduced to the works of classical writers.

=== Military career ===
In 1812 Jósika joined the cavalry regiment of the Hungarian army led by Jenő Savoyai, which was engaged in a campaign in Italy as part of the Sixth Coalition of the Napoleonic Wars. He was present at the second battle of the Mincio River in February 1814, serving under Austrian command against French and Italian troops, and was promoted to the rank of lieutenant. He was promoted to captain in March 1814 and remained in active service until Napoleon was defeated later that year. Following his promotion to the rank of captain, Jósika traveled back to Transylvania, where he engaged in a duel that left a permanent scar on his face. In 1815 he took part in a campaign in France and became familiar with French literature and art. Between 1816 and 1818, he was stationed in Vienna.

=== Politics and writing ===
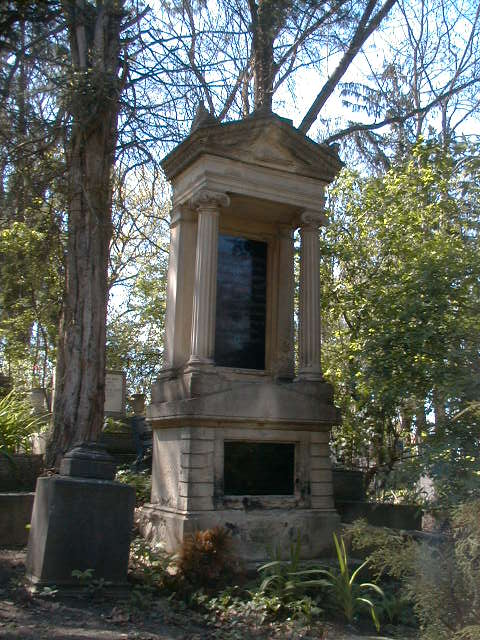
Jósika's tomb at the Házsongárd cemetery.

In 1817, Jósika became engaged to Elizabeth Kállay of the Kállay family. He resigned from his army commission in 1818 and returned to Hungary where he and Elizabeth married. Following his wedding, Jósika lived on his father's estate in Napkoron and often traveled to Transylvania, where he spent most of his time writing novels and poems. He visited Pest for the first time in 1831. By the early 1830s, his marriage turned sour and Jósika divorced his wife and moved to Szurdok. In 1834 he began to take on an active role in the political life of the Transylvanian Diet, although he was described to be shy and reserved. He represented his liberal philosophy by defending the freedoms enjoyed by the public despite relentless attacks. Due to his personality, overly humble and careful, Jósika recused himself and left the political assembly to dedicate his time to literature and the arts. He moved to Pest, the center of Hungarian literature at the time, and occasionally visited Szurdok in search of inspiration. He idolized Baron Miklós Wesselényi and following his example, he released his serfs from most of their tax and labor obligations.

Historians describe Jósika's political views as liberal and aligned with those of writer Sándor Bölöni Farkas, who in turn was an advocate of British and American democracy. Together with other noblemen, Wesselényi and Jósika were among the gentry liberal opposition and formed the "Pro-British League of Transylvanian Aristocrats." Their central political stance was to call for parliamentary reform to enhance democracy while preserving the role of the Crown. In this, they stood in opposition to the more conservative pro-monarchy majority, and to the "Radical Opposition" headed by a lawyer, and later Regent-President of Hungary, Lajos Kossuth. In the course of 1848, Jósika drew closer to the views of Kossuth.

In addition to politics, Jósika turned his attention to writing, producing more than 60 romance novels between the early 1830s and 1854. His first work, Abafi, was published in 1836. The book is a morality tale, describing a fictional knight in the service of Transylvanian prince Sigismund Bathory. Over the course of the book, the eponymous hero transforms his life from one of debauchery to public respect and promotion, before sacrificing himself in the battle to protect his prince. It was Josika's best-selling work and was an inspiration to inventor Nikola Tesla, among others, who credited it with setting him on the path to mental self-discipline. Elements of Jósika's liberal political philosophy were evident in his casting of the characters, and the work remained popular among socially progressive Hungarians into the early twentieth century.

Jósika's literary achievements garnered substantial societal recognition in Hungary. In the late 1830s he was elected as a member of the Hungarian Academy of Sciences and of the Kisfaludy Society, a prominent literary group of which he became director in 1841 and vice-president in 1842. His political pursuits continued; in 1847 he appeared before the Transylvanian Diet as a representative for Szolnok to unsuccessfully advocate for a formal union between Transylvania and Hungary. Influenced by his political allies, he also converted to Protestantism. In 1847 he procured a divorce from his wife Elizabeth, whom he had not seen for many years. Once this was obtained, Jósika immediately entered into an engagement, and then marriage with Baroness Julia Podmaniczky, a fellow writer and member of an influential Hungarian family.

=== Later years ===
The Hungarian Revolution of 1848 gave power to the Radical Opposition, including Jósika's erstwhile political foe Lajos Kossuth. Jósika closely associated himself with the new government and was rewarded with appointments to a restructured Hungarian Upper House and to the committee of national defence. However, after the defeat of the Hungarian Revolution of 1848, Jósika and his wife went into exile in Dresden in 1849. They never returned to Hungary. Instead, they chose to relocate to Brussels in 1850 where Jósika returned to writing romance novels under a pseudonym. In declining health, he returned to Dresden in 1864 and died there on 27 February 1865. His body was interred at the Hajongard cemetery in Cluj-Napoca, around 20 miles (32 km) from his birthplace of Turda.

== Works ==
- Irány (1835)
- Vázolatok (1835)
- Abafi (1836)
- Zólyomi (1836)
- Az utolsó Bátori (1837)
- A könnyelműek (1837)
- The Czechs in Hungary (1839)
- Végnapok (1842)
- Zrínyi, a költő (1843)
- A két Barcsai (1844)
- Ifjabb Békesi Ferenc kalandjai (1845)
- Diamante (1846)
- Akarat és hajlam (1846)
- A Two-Storey House in Budapest (1847)
- Stephen Jósika (1847)
- A Hungarian Family During the Revolution (1852)
- Eszther (1853)
- The Witches in Szeged (1854)
- Pygmaleon, or, A Hungarian Family in Paris (1856)
- The Hidden Wound (1857)
- Visszhangok (1859)
- Francis Rákóczi II (1862)
- Two lives (1862)
- Clara and Clare (1863)
- Sziklarózsa (1864)
