= Cristolț =

- Commune
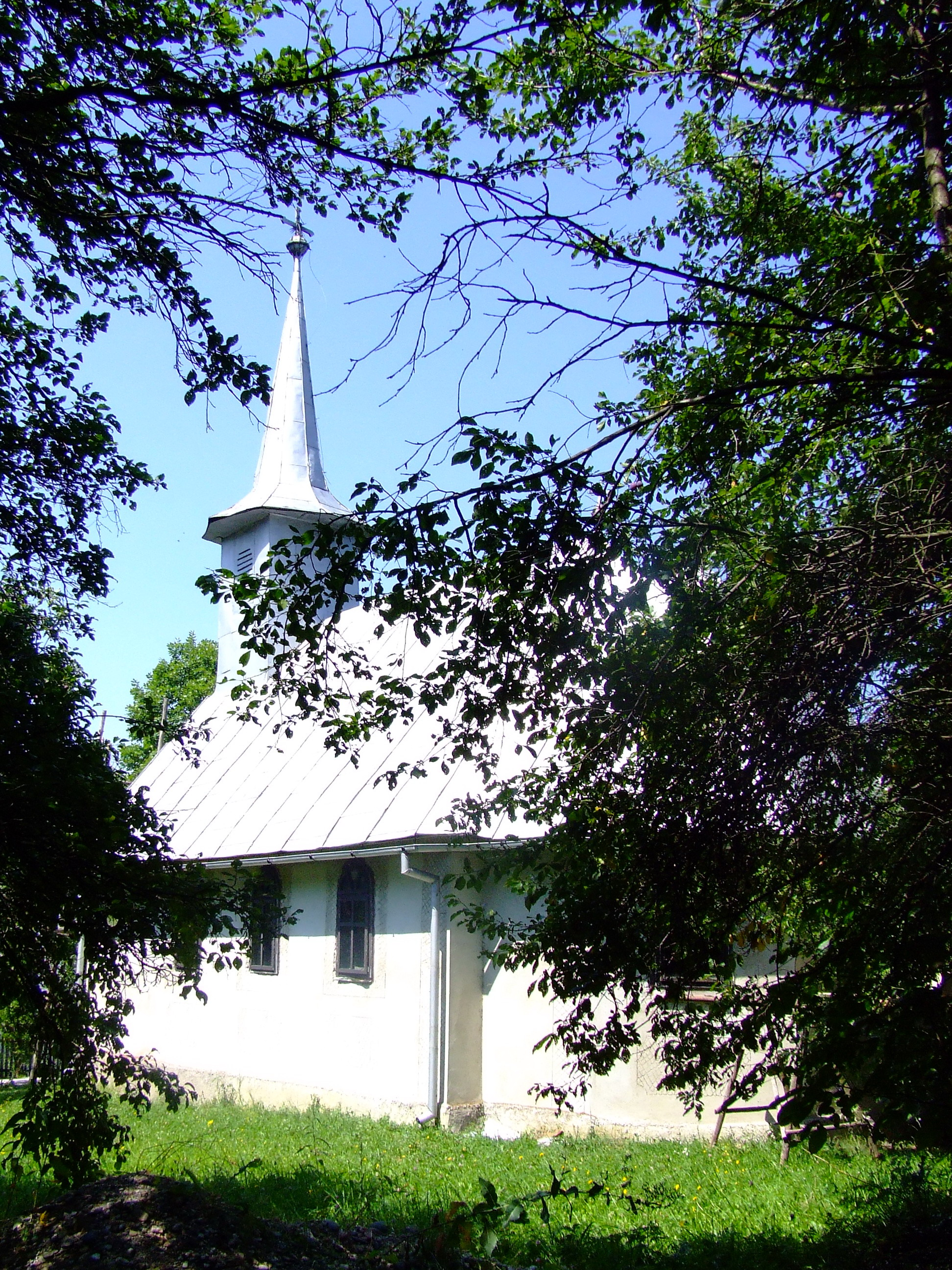
- Wooden Church in Poiana Onții

- Location in Sălaj County

- Location in Romania
- Coordinates: 47°12′31″N 23°26′15″E
- Country: Romania
- County: Sălaj

Government
  - Mayor (2020–2024): Ioan Cheseli (PSD)
- Area: 44.66 km^{2} (17.24 sq mi)
- Elevation: 315 m (1,033 ft)
- Population (2021-12-01): 1,056
  - Density: 23.65/km^{2} (61.24/sq mi)
- Time zone: UTC+02:00 (EET)
  - Summer (DST): UTC+03:00 (EEST)
- Postal code: 457100
- Area code: +(40) 0260
- Vehicle reg.: SJ
- Website: www.comunacristolt.ro

Cristolț (Hungarian: Nagykeresztes) is a commune located in Sălaj County, Transylvania, Romania. It is composed of four villages: Cristolț, Muncel (Hegyköz), Poiana Onții (Bezdédmező), and Văleni (Szalonnavölgy).

== Sights ==
- Wooden Church in Poiana Onții, built in the 18th century (1780)
