= 1848–1849 massacres in Transylvania =

Massacres in Transylvania

The 1848–1849 massacres in Transylvania were committed in the Hungarian Revolution of 1848. According to Hungarian historian Ákos Egyed, 14,000 to 15,000 people were massacred in Transylvania in this period. The victims comprised 7,500–8,500 Hungarians, 4,400–6,000 Romanians, and about 500 Transylvanian Saxons, Armenians, Jews and members of other groups.

== Massacres of Hungarians ==
On 18 October 1848, Romanians attacked and murdered inhabitants of the village of Kisenyed (now Sângătin), located near Nagyszeben (Hermannstadt, now Sibiu). Another important event of the 1848–1849 conflict was the massacre at Nagyenyed (today Aiud) [8–9 January 1849]. During the event, Romanians massacred around 600–1,000 people in the town. Additionally, the troops of Transylvanian Romanians organized by Avram Iancu, who were supporting the Emperor of Austria, fought the organized Hungarian forces from Zalatna (today Zlatna) and Körösbánya (Baia de Criș).

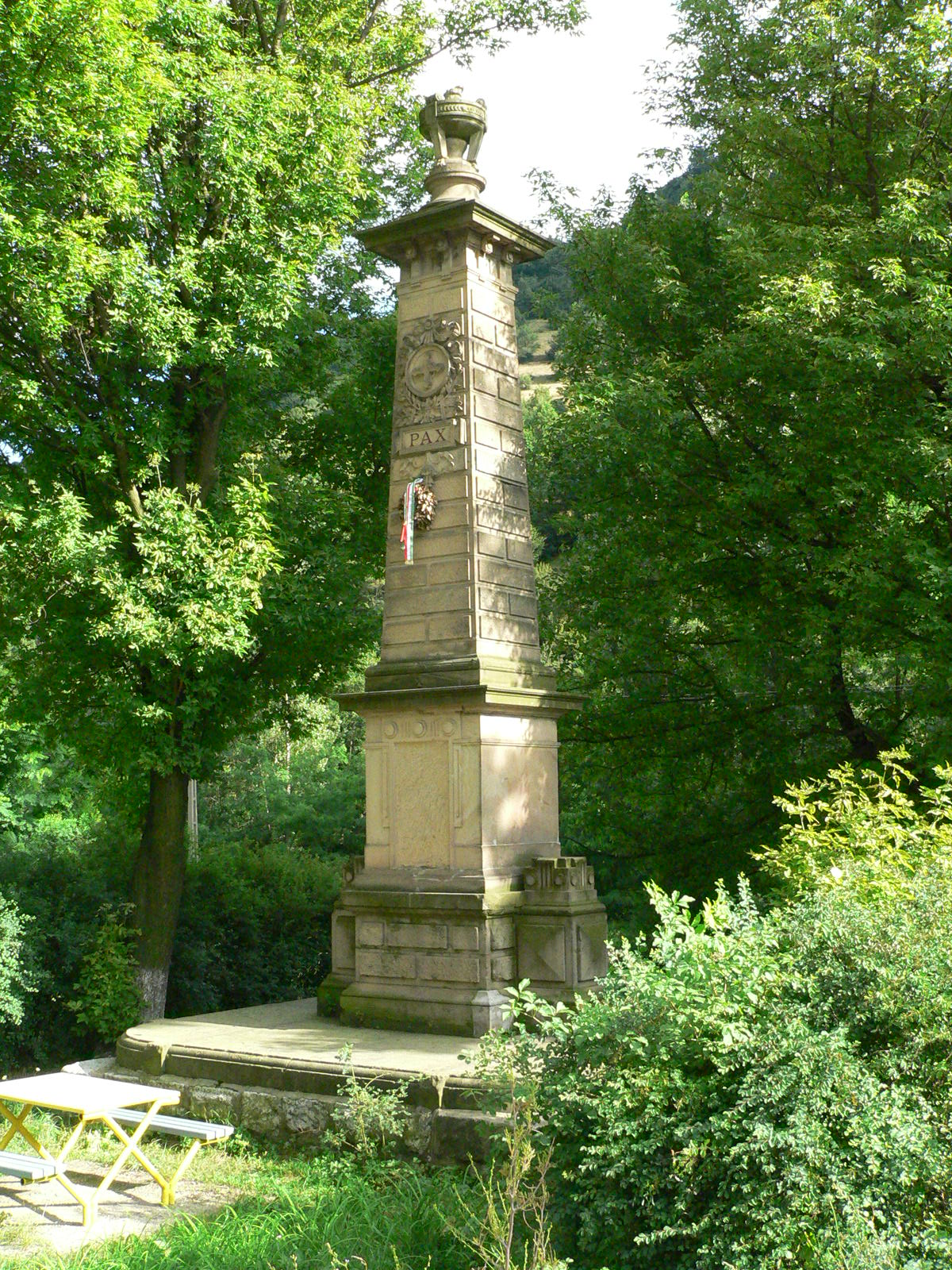
Monument to the victims of the Zalatna (Zlatna) massacre.

During the fight of Zalatna in October 1848, about 640 citizens of the town were killed including teachers, priests, doctors, and merchants. Thirteen thousand gold and twenty thousand silver coins were robbed from the town's treasury. The massacre was incited and led by local Romanian lawyer Petru Dobra. Thirty Hungarians were killed in Boklya. About 200 Hungarians were killed in Gerendkeresztúr (Grindeni) and some 90 beaten to death near Marosújvár (Ocna Mureș).

=== Timeline of massacres of Hungarians ===
Massacres with recorded, mostly civilian, Hungarian victims occurred in the following places:

Massacre	Date	Location	County	Now named	Victims	Notes
Algyógy massacre	October 1848	Algyógy	Hunyad County	Geoagiu	85	Mostly civilians
Borosbocsárd massacre	October 1848	Borosbocsárd	Alsó-Fehér County	part of Ighiu	73	Mostly civilians
Diód massacre	October 1848	Diód	Alsó-Fehér County	Stremț	25	Local noble families
Gyulafehérvár massacre	October 1848	Gyulafehérvár	Alsó-Fehér County	Alba Iulia	42	Mass torture, arson, and civilians massacred
Gerendkeresztúr massacre	October 1848	Gerendkeresztúr	Torda County	part of Chețani	200	Civilians
Székelykocsárd massacre	October 1848	Székelykocsárd	Aranyos Seat	Lunca Mureșului	60	Civilians
Hátszeg massacre	October 1848	Hátszeg	Hunyad County	Hațeg	15	Civilians massacred on the order of the Romanian Eastern Orthodox priest.
Marosújvár massacre	October 1848	Marosújvár	Alsó-Fehér County	Ocna Mureș	90	Civilians living in the town
Mikeszásza massacre	October 1848	Mikeszásza	Alsó-Fehér County	Micăsasa	150	All locals except for one family were massacred
Kisenyed massacre	14 October 1848	Kisenyed	Alsó-Fehér County	Sângătin	140–175	Civilians
Zalatna massacre	22–24 October 1848	Zalatna	Alsó-Fehér County	Zlatna	700	All the Hungarian civilians fled from the town, but were raided near the village Presaca Ampoiului and were all massacred. The town was completely destroyed
Magyarigen massacre	29 October 1848	Magyarigen	Alsó-Fehér County	Ighiu	200	The entire Hungarian population of the village, except for the Hungarian priest, was massacred.
Boklya massacre	30 October 1848	Boklya	Bihar County	Bochia	30	Mostly civilians
Felvinc massacre	13 November 1848	Felvinc	Aranyos Seat	Unirea	200	The whole village was destroyed and most civilians massacred
Köpec massacre	9 December 1848	Köpec	Háromszék County	Căpeni	51	After the imperial victory of Hídvég over the Székelys from the Háromszék county, the Austrians sent the Romanian and Saxon insurgents, who were supporting them in the battle, to pillage the village. The insurgents burned down the village, killing 51 people, among them even a retired k.u.k. officer, who was living there.
Hétfalu massacre	23 December 1848	Hétfalu	Brassó County	Șapte Sate	55	On 23 December 1848 a huge Romanian insurgent force arrived, burned, and pillaged the localities, killing 55 Hungarian Csángó inhabitants.
Nagyenyed massacre	8–17 January 1849	Nagyenyed	Alsó-Fehér County	Aiud	600–1,000	Mostly civilians. The whole city with the ancient Bethlen College was burned and destroyed. Mass rape and torture.
Alsójára massacre	15 January 1849	Alsójára	Torda County	Iara	150	Civilians
Borosbenedek massacre	January 1849	Borosbenedek	Alsó-Fehér County	Benic	400	By the order of the Romanian Greek Catholic priest, the entire Hungarian population was wiped out
Hari massacre	January 1849	Hari	Alsó-Fehér County	Heria	18	
Abrudbánya massacre	9 and 17 May 1849	Abrudbánya	Alsó-Fehér County	Abrud	1,100–1,200	Mass torture and rape. Victims were mostly local miners and town officers and their whole families.
Bucsesd massacre	9 May 1849	Bucsesd	Hunyad County	Buceș	200	

This table contains only the recorded victims, however, the exact number of deceased civilians is hard to determine. There are several dozens of villages all over Transylvania where the number of massacred locals (predominantly Hungarians) is unknown. Furthermore, these numbers might not include those who did not perish in the massacres per se but during their imprisonment, fleeing, disappearance, or forced resettlement to Naszód, Hátszeg or Monorfalva by the Romanians.

Soon after the war, in 1850, the Habsburg court conducted a census of the victims. However, the authenticity of this census has been questioned and heavily criticized over time, as the authorities only conducted the census in Romanian and Saxon-populated areas and ignored even mentioning some of the largest massacres against Hungarian civilians in Transylvania, such as Nagyenyed, Abrudbánya or Zalatna.

Among the victims of the Romanian massacres, important Hungarian personalities or their relatives were to be found. Mária, the sister of the Hungarian dramatist Imre Madách was caught together with her husband and her son, being all killed by the Romanian insurgents, and thrown in front of pigs to be eaten. Africa's first female researcher, Florence Baker's (her original, Hungarian, name was Flóra Sass) parents and brothers and sisters were killed by the Romanian militia, led by Ioan Axente Sever in Nagyenyed (now Aiud) during the massacre of the Hungarian population of the town at 8 January 1849.

== Massacres of Romanians ==
=== Beginning: the clash in Mihálcfalva ===
Encouraged by the enlightened declarations of the revolutionaries of Pest about the liberation of all serfs in Hungary and the abolition of feudalism, as well as by the declarations of the Romanian national assemblies on 30 April and 15 May in the Transylvanian town of Balázsfalva (now Blaj), villagers in the southern Transylvanian Mihálcfalva (now Mihalț) illegally occupied a parcel of land belonging to the Esterházy family. On 1 June 1848, an imperial committee was appointed in Gyulafehérvár (now Alba Iulia) and sent out to Mihálcfalva to investigate the illegalities that took place in May. However, thousands of armed peasants from Obrázsa (now Obreja), Oláhcsesztve (now Cistei) and Alsókarácsonfalva (now Crăciunelu de Jos) gathered against them and refused their entry to the village. On the next day, 2 June 1848, an official regiment was sent from Gyulafehérvár by Anton von Puchner, commander in chief of the Austrian troops in Transylvania to disarm the armed peasants and guarantee the safety of the imperial committee during their investigation. However, the peasants resisted and the resulting armed clash killed 12 Romanian peasants and 1 Hungarian soldier. Other sources put the number of Romanian peasants shot dead at 14, with 50 other wounded, many of whom subsequently died. This was the first Transylvanian armed conflict in 1848.

An important strategic step of Anton von Puchner in the days leading up to the clash was his specific choice for a Székely Hungarian regiment to be sent against the armed Romanian peasants. In doing so, Anton von Puchner played a major role in the exacerbation of political-ethnic differences in the region and in the further radicalization of both Romanian and Hungarian peasants in Transylvania. As the power of Austrians weakened due to the initial successes of the Austrian, Czech, Slovak, Polish and Hungarian revolutionaries throughout the Habsburg Empire, the events in Mihálcfalva were published in the pro-imperial newspaper Der Siebenbürger Bote and were interpreted as a radical Hungarian assault against Romanian civilians, despite the fact that at the time of the conflict, the Székely frontier guards were still directly subordinate to the imperial court and to Anton von Puchner, commander in chief of the Transylvanian Austrian troops. The event, followed by the pro-imperial propaganda further boosted unrest and hostility in the region, and largely contributed to the mass-armament of Transylvanian Romanians and to the organization of the second national assembly in the town of Balászfalva in September 1848.

=== Further incidents ===
In the autumn of 1848, dozens of Romanians from a village in Northern Transylvania who opposed the forced conscription into the Hungarian army were killed after the attack of a 200-man force. On 10 September 1848, Hungarian military units from Arad killed 3 Romanians in Nadab (now part of Chișineu-Criș) after a conflict with several thousand locals armed with scythes who refused recruitment into the Hungarian Army, while other were imprisoned in Nagyvárad (now Oradea), Arad and Szeged. On 12 September 1848, in the village Aranyoslóna (now part of Luna), the count of Torda, Miklós Thorotzkai, gave the order to fire into the crowd that opposed recruitment into the Hungarian army, killing 30 people and wounding several tens. On 18 October 1848 one Romanian peasant in Almás (now Almaș) was executed for refusing to join the Hungarian army. Additionally, Avram Iancu distributed copies of the "emperor's message" among village priests in the region of the Apuseni Mountains. The command called all minorities across the Hungarian Kingdom to get armed and resist the Hungarian Revolution. A total of nine Romanian priests from 6 villages were found guilty for having read out this message in front of the villagers, and were charged with public incitement and executed. After entering Balázsfalva on 18 January 1849, Hungarian troops looted the town and reportedly committed plundering against the local Romanian population, but a massacre did not take place. 6 people from Butyin (now Buteni), 1 person from Keszend (now Chisindia), and 1 person from Barza (now Bârsa) were killed for opposing the plundering in the region, committed by the Hungarian military.

=== Timeline of massacres of Romanians by Hungarians ===
Massacre	Date	Location	Romanian victims	Notes
Mihálcfalva conflict	2 June 1848	Mihálcfalva, Alsó-Fehér County (now Mihalț)	12 or 14	Armed clash with the Hungarian-speaking Habsburg imperial regiment of Anton von Puchner
Nadab massacre	10 September 1848	Nadab, Arad County (now Nădab)	3	Killed for opposing conscription
Aranyoslóna massacre	12 September 1848	Aranyoslóna, Torda County (now Luna)	30	Fire in the crowd that refused military recruitment
Butyin massacre	6 August 1849	Butyin, Arad County (now Buteni)	8	Civilians massacred for opposing the plundering of Hungarian troops

According to the official lists (that were published in the newspaper Wiener Zeitung) 4,425 men, 340 women and 69 children were killed without trial by the Hungarian military tribunals in Transylvania, exclusive of the ones who died in open fighting. 4,425 of the victims appear to have been Romanians, 165 Hungarians, 252 Saxons and 72 Jews, Gypsies and others.

== See also ==
- Anti-Hungarian sentiment
- Anti-Romanian sentiment
- Transylvanian Revolution
- Hungarian Revolution of 1848
- List of massacres in Romania
- 1940–1944 massacres in Transylvania
