= List of massacres in Romania =

The following is a list of massacres that have occurred in the territory of present-day Romania (numbers may be approximate):

Name	Date	Present location	Deaths	Notes
Siculeni massacre	7 January 1764	Csík-Mádéfalva, Principality of Transylvania, Habsburg monarchy (today Siculeni, Harghita County)	400 Székelys	Memorial plaque unveiled on the spot in 1899 mentions 200 victims.
Revolt of Horea, Cloșca and Crișan	late 1784	Grand Principality of Transylvania, Habsburg Monarchy (today primarily Hunedoara County, Alba County, and Arad County, to a lesser extent also Brașov County, Sibiu County, Cluj County, Timiș County)	About 4,000 victims	Mostly Hungarian nobles and Hungarian civilians in towns were targeted in a total of 133 settlements. Further thousands were forcedly converted to Romanian Orthodoxy.
Mihalț massacre	2 June 1848	Michelsdorf, Grand Principality of Transylvania, Austrian Empire (today Mihalț, Alba County)	12 armed Romanian peasants	After an illegal attack on a noble estate in the village, thousands of armed peasants from Obreja, Cistei, and Crăciunelu de Jos gathered to refuse the entry of the imperial investigative committee, and the entry of the official regiment sent by Anton von Puchner, commander in chief of the Austrian troops in Transylvania. The resulting armed clash killed 12 Romanian peasants and 1 Hungarian soldier. This was the first Transylvanian armed conflict in 1848 and played a major role in the exacerbation of political-ethnic differences in the region.
Nadab massacre	10 September 1848	Nadab, Arad County, Grand Principality of Transylvania, Austrian Empire (today Nădab, Arad County)	3 ethnic Romanians	Hungarian troops killed ethnic Romanian civilians after they opposed conscription.
Aranyoslóna massacre	12 September 1848	Aranyoslóna	30 Romanians	Hungarian troops shoot in the mass of ethnic Romanian civilians who gathered to oppose the conscription. In the clash also Hungarians fell.
Geoagiu massacre	October 1848	Gergesdorf, Grand Principality of Transylvania, Austrian Empire (today Geoagiu, Hunedoara County)	85 ethnic Hungarians	Mostly civilians
Bucerdea Vinoasă massacre	October 1848	Botschard, Grand Principality of Transylvania, Austrian Empire (today Bucerdea Vinoasă, Alba County)	73 ethnic Hungarians	Mostly civilians
Stremț massacre	October 1848	Nussschloss, Grand Principality of Transylvania, Austrian Empire (today Stremț, Alba County)	25 ethnic Hungarians	Local noble families
Alba Iulia massacre	October 1848	Karlsburg, Grand Principality of Transylvania, Austrian Empire (today Alba Iulia, Alba County)	42 ethnic Hungarians	Civilians
Grindeni massacre	October 1848	Gerendkeresztúr, Grand Principality of Transylvania, Austrian Empire (today Grindeni, Mureș County)	200 ethnic Hungarians	Civilians
Lunca Mureșului massacre	October 1848	Holten, Grand Principality of Transylvania, Austrian Empire (today Lunca Mureșului, Mureș County)	60 ethnic Hungarians	Civilians
Hațeg massacre	October 1848	Wallenthal, Grand Principality of Transylvania, Austrian Empire (today Hațeg, Hunedoara County)	15 ethnic Hungarians	Civilians massacred on the order of the Romanian Orthodox priest.
Ocna Mureș massacre	October 1848	Miereschhall, Grand Principality of Transylvania, Austrian Empire (today Ocna Mureș, Alba County)	90 ethnic Hungarians	Civilians living in the town
Micăsasa massacre	October 1848	Feigendorf, Grand Principality of Transylvania, Austrian Empire (today Micăsasa, Sibiu County)	150 ethnic Hungarians	All locals except for one family were massacred
Sângătin massacre	14 October 1848	Kleinenyed, Grand Principality of Transylvania, Austrian Empire (today Sângătin, Sibiu County)	140–175 ethnic Hungarians	Mostly civilians
Zlatna massacre	22–24 October 1848	Kleinschlatten, Grand Principality of Transylvania, Austrian Empire (today Zlatna, Alba County)	8–10 Romanian spearmen 700 ethnic Hungarians	All the Hungarian civilians fled from the town but were raided near the village Presaca Ampoiului and were all massacred. The town was completely destroyed.
Ighiu massacre	29 October 1848	Grabendorf, Grand Principality of Transylvania, Austrian Empire (today Ighiu, Alba County)	200 ethnic Hungarians	The entire Hungarian population of the village, except for the Hungarian priest was massacred.
Bochia massacre	30 October 1848	Boklya, Grand Principality of Transylvania, Austrian Empire (today Bochia, Arad County)	30 ethnic Hungarians	Mostly civilians
Unirea massacre	13 November 1848	Oberwinz, Grand Principality of Transylvania, Austrian Empire (today Unirea, Alba County)	200 ethnic Hungarians	The whole village was destroyed and most civilians massacred
Aiud massacre	8–17 January 1849	Straßburg am Mieresch, Grand Principality of Transylvania, Austrian Empire (today Aiud, Alba County)	800–1,000 ethnic Hungarians	Mostly civilians. The whole city with the ancient Bethlen College was burned and destroyed. Mass rape and torture.
Iara massacre	15 and 17 January 1849	Jahren, Grand Principality of Transylvania, Austrian Empire (today Iara, Cluj County)	150 ethnic Hungarians and 33 ethnic Romanians	Civilians
Benic massacre	January 1849	Unter-Hahnenberg, Grand Principality of Transylvania, Austrian Empire (today Benic, Alba County)	400 ethnic Hungarians	By the order of the Romanian Greek Catholic priest, the entire Hungarian population was wiped out
Heria massacre	January 1849	Brenndorf, Grand Principality of Transylvania, Austrian Empire (today Heria, Alba County)	18 ethnic Hungarians	
Abrud massacre	9 and 17 May 1849	Großschlatten, Grand Principality of Transylvania, Austrian Empire (today Abrud, Alba County)	1,100–1,200 ethnic Hungarians	Mass torture and rape. Casualties were mostly miners and officers and their families.
Buceș massacre	9 May 1849	Bucsesd, Grand Principality of Transylvania, Austrian Empire (today Buceș, Hunedoara County)	200 ethnic Hungarians	
Butyin massacre	6 August 1848	Butyin, Arad County, Grand Principality of Transylvania, Austrian Empire (today Buteni, Arad County)	8 ethnic Romanians	Ethnic Romanians killed for opposing the plundering by Hungarian troops.
Massacres during the Peasants' Revolt	March–April 1907	Western Moldavia and southern Wallachia, Kingdom of Romania	cca. 11,000 peasants	Peasants rebelling against economic conditions killed in various places across the country
1916 Galați massacre	13 June 1916	Galați, Covurlui County, Kingdom of Romania (today Galați, Galați County)	9 workers	Workers participating in an anti-war demonstration shot by the army
Lăzarea massacre	22 September 1916	Gyergyószárhegy, Austria-Hungary (today Lăzarea, Harghita County)	8 Hungarian civilians	The leadership of the village was shot in a mass grave without trial, further 57 civilians only escaped because a high-ranking officer arrived and stopped the massacre.
Beliș massacre	8 November 1918	Jósikafalva, Austria-Hungary (today Beliș, Cluj County)	45–50 civilians	Mostly ethnic Romanians
Theater's Square massacre	13 December 1918	Bucharest, Kingdom of Romania	up to 102 workers	Striking workers shot by the army
Tărcaia and Grădinari massacres	19 April 1919	Köröstárkány and Kisnyégerfalva, Hungarian Soviet Republic (today Tărcaia and Grădinari, Bihor County)	108 ethnic Hungarians	All civilians.
Lupeni massacre	6 August 1929	Lupeni, Hunedoara County, Kingdom of Romania	22 workers	Striking workers shot by the army and the gendarmerie
Grivița massacre	16 February 1933	Bucharest, Kingdom of Romania	7 workers	Striking workers shot by the army and the gendarmerie
1940 Galați massacre	30 June 1940	Galați, Covurlui County, Kingdom of Romania (today Galați, Galați County)	80 to 400 Bessarabian and Jewish refugees	Bessarabians returning home and Jewish Romanians wanting to escape the anti-Semitic regime shot while waiting to cross into the Soviet Union
Dorohoi pogrom	1 July 1940	Dorohoi, Dorohoi County, Kingdom of Romania (today Dorohoi, Botoșani County)	53 Jews	Jewish community in Dorohoi claims the death toll between 165 and 200.
Nușfalău massacre	8 September 1940	Szilágynagyfalu, Northern Transylvania, Kingdom of Hungary (today Nușfalău, Sălaj County)	11 ethnic Romanians	
Treznea massacre	9 September 1940	Treznea, Northern Transylvania, Kingdom of Hungary (today Treznea, Sălaj County)	93 ethnic Romanians and Jews	
Ip massacre	14 September 1940	Ip, Northern Transylvania, Kingdom of Hungary (today Ip, Sălaj County)	157 ethnic Romanians	158, including an unborn child
Jilava massacre	26 November 1940	Jilava, Ilfov County, Kingdom of Romania	64 political detainees	
Bucharest pogrom	22 January 1941	Bucharest, Kingdom of Romania	120 Jews	Five other Jews were missing and presumed dead.
Iași pogrom	29 June - 6 July 1941	Iași, Iași County, Kingdom of Romania	13,266 Jews	Under the direction of Marshal Ion Antonescu, one third of the city's Jewish population was exterminated
Aita Seacă massacre	4 September 1944	Szárazajta, Northern Transylvania, Kingdom of Hungary (today Aita Seacă, Covasna County)	|	
Luduș massacre	5–13 September 1944	Marosludas, Northern Transylvania, Kingdom of Hungary (today Luduș, Mureș County)	15 Jews and 2 ethnic Romanians	
Sărmașu massacre	17 September 1944	Nagysármás, Northern Transylvania, Kingdom of Hungary (today Sărmașu, Mureș County)	126 Jews	
Hărcana massacre	24 September 1944	Hărcana, Northern Transylvania, Kingdom of Hungary (today Hărcana, Cluj County)	18 ethnic Romanians	
Various massacres by the Maniu Guard	September–October 1944	Northern Transylvania, Kingdom of Hungary	49 ethnic Hungarians	Mihăileni, Gheorgheni, Sândominic, Zimbor, Aghireș, Huedin
Moisei massacre	14 October 1944	Majszin, Northern Transylvania, Kingdom of Hungary (today Moisei, Maramureș County)	29 ethnic Romanians	Two men were also seriously injured.
Romanian Revolution of 1989	16–25 December 1989	Main Romanian cities, Socialist Republic of Romania	1,104	
Ethnic clashes of Târgu Mureș	19–21 March 1990	Târgu Mureș, Mureș County, Romania	5	Hundreds of people were also wounded.
June 1990 Mineriad	13–15 June 1990	Bucharest, Romania	6–100	
September 1991 Mineriad	25–28 September 1991	Bucharest, Romania	4	
Hădăreni riots	20 September 1993	Hădăreni, Mureș County, Romania	3	
2012 Bucharest hair salon shooting	5 March 2012	Bucharest, Romania	5	A 51-year old man killed 2 people and injured another 8 people in a salon in Bucharest.
Săpoca Hospital massacre	18 August 2019	Săpoca, Buzău County, Romania	7	A 38-year-old man hospitalised at the Săpoca Hospital killed 5 people and hurt 8 with an infusion stand
Bascov massacre	9 August 2022	Bascov, Arges County, Romania	5	Viorel Letcan kills five members of his family, including a 5-year-old girl.

== See also ==
- 1848–1849 massacres in Transylvania
- 1940–1944 massacres in Transylvania
