= Sărmașu massacre =

1944 killings of Jews and Romanian prisoners of war in Romania

- Part of the Holocaust
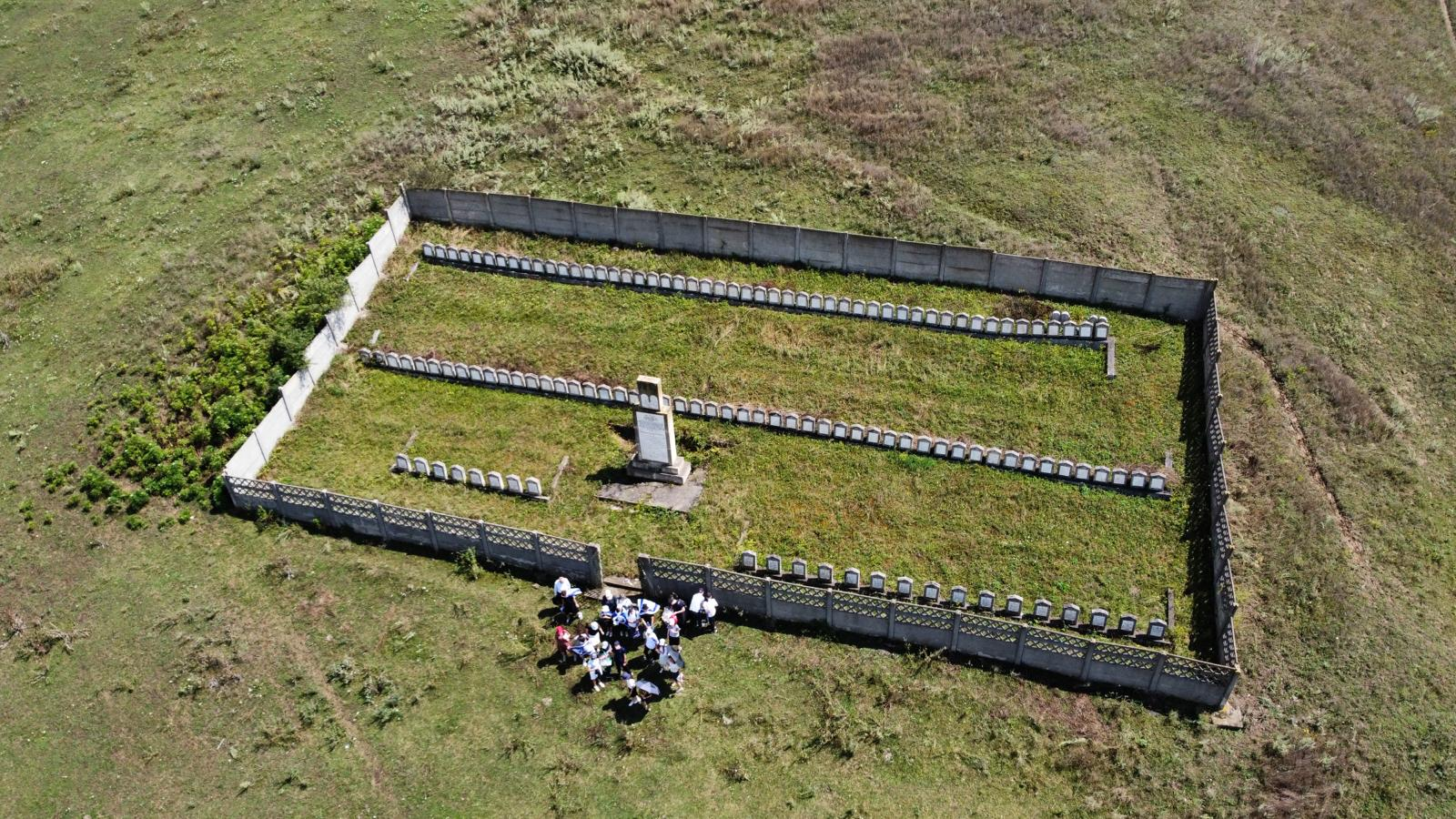
- The cemetery in the massacre area

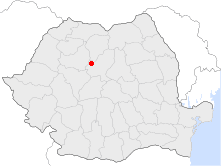
- Location of Sărmașu within the current borders of Romania
- Location: 46°45′13″N 24°10′0″E; Sărmașu, Kingdom of Romania
- Date: 5 September–10 October 1944
- Attack type: Genocide, ethnic cleansing
- Deaths: 165; 126 Jews; 39 Romanians
- Perpetrator: Hungarian National Guard supported by local sympathizers
- Motive: Antisemitism, Hungarian irredentism

Sărmașu massacre refers to the torture and massacre of 165 people, primarily Jews, committed by Hungarian paramilitaries in Sărmașu, Cluj-Turda County, during World War II.

Following Romania's defection from the Axis powers and alignment with the Allies during World War II, Sărmașu was occupied by Nazi-aligned Hungarian troops between 5 September and 10 October 1944. During this period, Hungarian gendarmes and members of the Hungarian National Guard, led by gendarmes captain Lánczos László, killed 126 local Jews (out of 142 who were living in the town at the time), as well as 39 Romanians, most of whom were prisoners of war captured in battles along the Oarba de Mureș–Luduș–Gheja–Chețani alignment during the Battle of Turda.

== The massacre ==
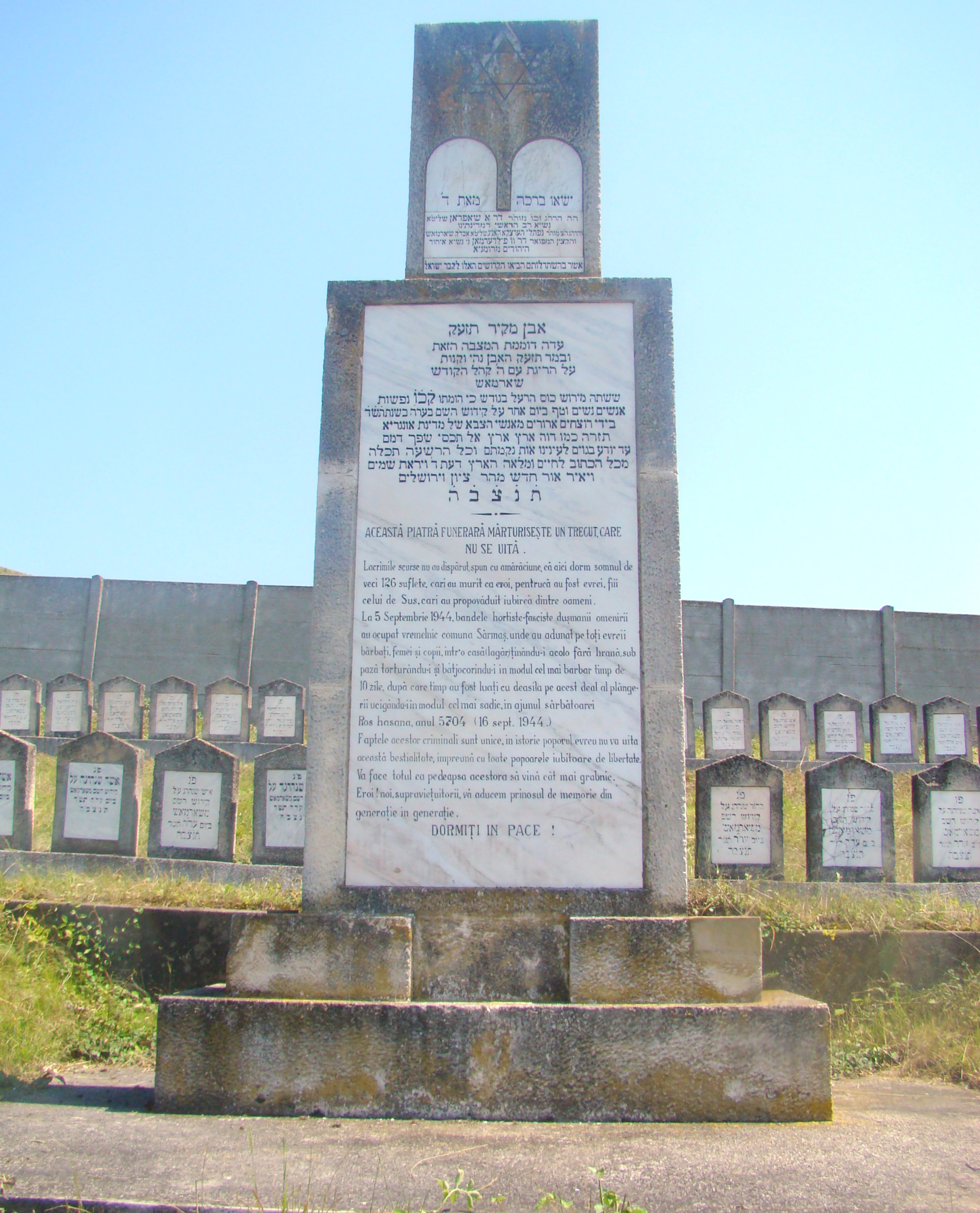
Cemetery of Jews killed by Horthysts in Sărmașu

Members of the Hungarian population who supported Hungary's cause and supported the reannexation of all of Transylvania started looting the homes of Jews and Romanians together with the Hungarian Guard. On 9 September 1944, a group of Hungarian gendarmes took several Romanians with important administrative roles in the commune from their homes. They were brought to an improvised camp in Sărmașu, where they were tortured for several days.

According to the sentence issued on 28 June 1946 by the People's Tribunal in Cluj, "inhumane treatment, consisting of beatings, ill-treatments and executions staged at night. For example, once all Romanians were removed from the camp in the yard, put on their knees («At the church»), and, after this exercise, everyone, regardless of age, was forced to overturn until exhaustion".

On the afternoon of 16 September, the 126 Jews held in the improvised camp were transported by carts to a place called Suscut. During the night of 16/17 September, they were killed by Hungarian gendarmes and soldiers. The bodies of the victims (31 men, 52 women, and 43 children up to the age 15) were exhumed from two mass graves in February 1945. The medico-legal commission that conducted the autopsies concluded that most victims died from gun shot wounds, while several children died of asphyxiation, having been buried alive.

On 15 September 1944, some Romanians were released, and 18 others were deported to Hungary. They were transported by truck to Cluj, where they were assembled and forced to march under escort by civilian police toward Jibou and then to Budapest. Among those deported and later declared dead was Iuliu Moldovan, the father of actor Ovidiu Iuliu Moldovan. Father Micu, a priest nearly 80 years old, was also killed. The exact number of deported Romanians deported who lost their lives is not known exactly.

== Sentence of People's Tribunal in Cluj ==
Investigations into those responsible for the massacres of Sărmașu and Luduș started in 1945 and ended in 1946. The Cluj Tribunal determined responsibility for the Sărmașu massacre, finding two gendarmerie officers (Captain Láncz László and Lieutenant Vecsey) and five non-commissioned officers (Second Lieutenant Halasz, Second Lieutenant Fekete, Sergeant Major Szabo, Sergeant Horváth István, and Sergeant Polgár) guilty and sentenced them to death.

Two local residents were also convicted for their participation in the massacre. János Pánczél, a soldier-gendarme from Sărmașu, and István Soós, a member of the Hungarian Civil Guard in Sărmașu, were sentenced to 20 years and 5 years in prison, respectively.

== See also ==
- Ip massacre
- Luduș massacre
- Treznea massacre
- List of massacres in Romania
