= Luduș massacre =

1944 massacre in Romania

- Location: Luduș, Kingdom of Romania
- Date: 5–13 September 1944 (CET)
- Attack type: genocide, ethnic cleansing
- Deaths: 15 ethnic Jews, 2 Romanians
- Perpetrators: Royal Hungarian Army, locals
- Motive: Antisemitism, Hungarian irredentism

The Luduș massacre occurred in the village of Luduș (Hungarian: Marosludas), in the Kingdom of Romania. Between 5 and 13 September 1944, on the outskirts of the village, the Royal Hungarian Army occupied the village and, with the help of natives, shot 15 Jews and 2 Romanians: Mihai Polac, Vilma Polac and their daughters Rozalia and Maria, Iosif Gluck and his daughter Rozalia, Mauriciu Fred, Ghizela Fred, Maria Kopstein, Adelca Izrael and the Haller sisters (Sarolta, Fani and Rozalia). The latter five were raped and subsequently murdered in the Haller sisters' home.

Following the recovery of the village, an investigation was started to find the culprits of the massacre. Investigations took place from 1945 to 1946. The Hungarian soldiers were never identified, but two natives, Bela Szabó and Elisabeta Bartha, were found guilty by the Romanian People's Tribunal in Cluj.

== See also ==
- List of massacres in Romania
- Ip massacre
- Sărmașu massacre
- Treznea massacre
