= Anti-Romanian sentiment =

Hostility toward or prejudice against Romanians

Anti-Romanian sentiment, also known as Romanophobia (Romanian: antiromânism, românofobie), is an animosity, hostility, hatred, aggression, and behaviour that consists of stereotypes or prejudices against Romanians as an ethnic, linguistic, religious, or perceived ethnic group. It can range from negative personal feelings of hatred to institutionalized, violent persecution.

To varying degrees, anti-Romanian discrimination and sentiment have both been present among the populations and governments of nations that border Romania, either towards Romania itself or towards Romanian ethnic minorities that have resided in these countries. Similar patterns have also existed towards other ethnic groups, both in the region and elsewhere in the world, especially where political borders do not coincide with the patterns of ethnic populations.

== By country ==
=== Kingdom of Hungary and the Habsburg Monarchy ===
The Transylvanian general assembly in the Middle Ages developed within the estate system of the larger Kingdom of Hungary. Its participants included several privleged corporate communities (universitates) who held distinct legal and territorial privleges. Some of these communities had strong linguistic and cultural characteristics. These estates included the Universitas Nobiles, that is, the Nobility, whom were not necessarily ethnically homogenous, the Universitatas Saxones, made up of Saxons, the Universitas Siculi/Syculi, made of Székelys, and, in the earlier medieval period, the Universitas Valachorum/Olachi/Valachi, made of Vlachs - that is - Romanians. The general assembly (congregatio generalis) of the four Estates had mainly supra-legislative powers in Transylvania, but it sometimes took measures regarding order in the country, relationships between the privileged, military issues, etc.

According to Romanian historian Ioan-Aurel Pop, a turning point in the history of the Romanian population in Transylvania was in 1366, when through the Decree of Turda, King Louis I Anjou of Hungary strengthened the power of the Roman Catholic Gentry at the expense of the Romanian nobility, who typically held authority and land traditionally and through local arrangements rather than direct Royal donation, making it such that the titles had to be deliberately confirmed by the King, though another decree in the same year stated that in the Province of Sebeș, "no man shall hold or keep an estate, as a noble or as a kenez, if he is not a true Catholic dutifully following the faith and confessed by the Roman Church." As such, given that Kings were hesitant to confirm and ennoble non-Catholics, Romanians gradually lost their status as an Estate and were thus excluded from Transylvania's assemblies. This meant that the Romanian population of Transylvania was both de facto and de jure excluded from the later Transylvanian Diet, which consisted of Hungarian, German, and Székely nobles (the Unio Trium Nationum).

In 1568, the Diet of Torda enacted the Edict of Torda, decreeing religious freedom in Transylvania in the Eastern Hungarian Kingdom, an extraordinary and unprecedented development for its time. Preachers were permitted to "preach the Gospel according to their own understanding", while persecution, imprisonment, and removal from office on religious grounds were prohibited. The first such list, dating from 1595, identified the four recognised religions: Roman Catholicism, Lutheranism, Calvinism and Unitarianism. The laws subsequently referred to the Orthodox religion of the Romanian population as a tolerated religion.

During the Habsburg rule of Transylvania, in order to escape their inferior status, and in correlation with the Austrian interest to strengthen Catholicism, the Romanian Orthodox accepted a proposal for a "church union" (accepting Catholic dogma and retaining Orthodox ritual and calendar), but the other privileged nations objected, and the status of the Romanians remained eventually unchanged.

In December 1918, in the aftermath of World War I, the Union of Transylvania with Romania was declared at Alba Iulia by an assembly of the delegates of ethnic Romanians in Transylvania. Following the Hungarian–Romanian War of 1919 and the Treaty of Trianon of 1920, Transylvania eventually became part of Romania.

=== Russia ===
==== Russian Empire ====
Bessarabia became part of the Russian Empire under the 1812 Treaty of Bucharest. A period of autonomy followed, but in 1828 all Romanian government institutions, schools and presses were closed and replaced by a Russian-style provincial administration. At the end of the 19th and the beginning of the 20th century, Bessarabia saw an intense process of Russification. Military service also became a new instrument of Russification. The process of Russification and colonization of this territory started to be carried out by representatives of other ethnic groups of the Russian Empire, including Jews, Germans, Bulgarians, Gagauz, and Ukrainians.

- Russian census 1817: 86% Romanians
- Russian census 1856: 74% Romanians
- Russian census 1897: 56% Romanians

==== Soviet Union ====
When the Russian Empire collapsed after the Russian Revolution of 1917, a local body called "Sfatul Țării" ("Council of the Country") was created in Bessarabia. Moldova became an independent republic on December 2, 1917. Given that Soviet raids already menaced the newly formed authority, the local body ("Sfatul Țării") called in support troops from the Kingdom of Romania. The troops entered Bessarabia on December 13. On March 27, 1918, Sfatul Țării voted to unite with Romania. Subsequently, the Soviet Union refused to recognize the union and initiated an intense propaganda campaign stating that the Kingdom of Romania was an imperialistic state.

Bessarabia remained a part of the Romanian national territory until June 1940, when the Soviet Union re-annexed the territory, as well as Northern Bukovina, after delivering an ultimatum that threatened the use of force (see Soviet occupation of Bessarabia and Northern Bukovina).

The convention of October 28, 1920, whereby the United Kingdom, France, Italy, and Japan recognized Romanian sovereignty in Bessarabia, was rejected as invalid by the USSR. The Soviet government even denied the validity of that part of the convention that stipulated that, upon Soviet request, the Council of the League of Nations could be empowered to arbitrate the Soviet-Romanian dispute over Bessarabia. In short, the Kremlin insisted that Romania was illegally occupying Bessarabia. Moscow also encouraged revolutionary activities by Bolshevik elements in Bessarabia.

The exact position of the USSR on these issues is unknown except for Moscow's unwillingness to make any concessions to the Romanian government on Bessarabian issues. Recent tracts by Romanian historians have emphasized the support given by Romanian Communists to the "democratic forces" opposed to alteration of the status quo in Transylvania in 1938 and subsequent years. True as this may be, there has been no evidence presented in support of any fundamental change in Moscow's positions with respect to Bessarabia in 1938 and subsequent years.

According to official NKVD documents, over 15,000 Romanians from Northern Bukovina were deported to Siberia in 1940 alone. The Soviet action culminated with the Fântâna Albă massacre, when 2,500 to 3,000 Romanian refugees who were attempting to leave Northern Bukovina for Romania were blocked by the Soviet Border Troops, and about 200 of them were summarily executed by shooting, at a place called "Fântâna Albă" (White Fountain in Romanian). This policy resulted in a substantial shrinkage of the Romanian population in the province. By 1941, out of 250,000 Romanians in Northern Bukovina, only 192,000 were left. On June 22, 1941, Romania joined Operation Barbarossa on the side of the Axis powers, in order to reclaim the lost territories of Bessarabia and Northern Bukovina; these territories were regained by the Soviet Union in 1944 (see Romania in World War II).

The territory of the Moldavian Soviet Socialist Republic (MSSR) was composed of Bessarabia (except for Southern Bessarabia, assigned to Ukraine) and a part of the territory of the former Moldavian Autonomous Soviet Socialist Republic (Transnistria), founded in 1924 within the territory of Ukraine. In the document confirming the establishment of the Moldavian Autonomous Soviet Socialist Republic (MASSR) on 12 October 1924, the western frontier of the republic was traced out not along the Dniester River but the Prut River. In the MASSR, the ideology of a separate Moldovan identity was pursued, including the introduction of the Moldovan language, distinct from Romanian. The Cyrillic alphabet and abundant Russisms were introduced.

In Bessarabia, the Soviet government pursued a policy of assimilation of the native Romanian population. First, the province was divided into a "Moldovan" Socialist Republic and a southern region known as Budjak, which was renamed Izmail Oblast and attached to the Ukrainian Soviet Socialist Republic. Elite elements of the Romanian population were then deported to Siberia, much like their Bukovinian counterparts. Russian and Ukrainian settlers were used to fill the vacant areas caused by the deportation of Romanians.

In 1946–1947, as a result of the famine organised in the MSSR (according to some data of certain scientists; official data has not yet been published), around 300,000 Romanians died and many instances of cannibalism occurred. In addition, the population of the former MASSR, as a part of the Ukrainian SSR, also suffered from the artificial famine in the 1930s when several million people died in Ukraine (see also Holodomor).

The territory of Transnistria was more industrialised in comparison with the other part of Moldova, and the industrialisation process of Transnistria was accompanied by a population flow from other areas of the USSR, especially from Russia. Although in the Republic of Moldova the level of population density was the highest one in the USSR, Moscow continued to stimulate the arrival of the labour force from outside, including that with a poor qualification. Even Igor Smirnov, the former leader of the separatist Transnistria, was sent in 1987 from Russia to Bender to be the director of an enterprise. This process was also amplified by the excessive militarization of the area.

The 1989 adoption of the Law on state language (official language) and Law on functioning of languages on the territory of the MSSR generated an extremely negative reaction in the industrial centres of Transnistria, where the largely Russian-speaking population was not being consulted, and felt threatened by the prospects of Romanianization. These laws proclaimed the Moldovan (Romanian) language, written in the Latin alphabet, as the only state language. The fact that Moldovan and Romanian are identical was recognised. Although a majority of the Transnistrian population never read these laws which served as a reason for the conflict's outburst, they feared that by the application of the new linguistic legislation, Russian language speakers would become second-class citizens. At the industrial enterprises, including those of the military-industrial complex of the USSR, strikes occurred protesting against granting official language status to the Moldavian (Romanian) language.

==== Modern-day Russia ====
Today, there is a strong opposition in Russia to Romania in the context of Moldova. A Russian newspaper, InfoRos, even accused Romanians of genocide against Moldovans. In 2022, during the Russian invasion of Ukraine and responding to a British declaration saying that Ukrainian attacks over military bases on Russian soil would be justified, the Russian news website Pravda.ru said that Romania could be the first candidate for an attack with 3M-54 Kalibr missiles, since "Romania may now invade Transnistria to save its Moldovan brothers there".

An ethnic slur against Romanians as well as Moldovans used by Russians is мамалыжник (mamalyzhnik; in plural мамалыжники, mamalyzhniki). It originates from mămăligă, a Romanian dish.

=== Post-Soviet Moldova ===
After the breakup of the USSR, various legislative reforms consolidated the position of ethnic Romanians/Moldovans, especially by establishing the Moldovan language as the official language. However, anti-Romanian sentiment and Moldovenism was promoted by Russophilic parties, especially the Edinstvo Movement and the Socialist Party of Moldova and, to a lesser manner, by the then-ruling Democratic Agrarian Party of Moldova. Valeriu Senic, the leader of the Socialist Party of Moldova, proposed the banning of Romanian nationalism in Moldova, as well as using the terms "Romanians" and "Romanian language", when referring to the state language of Moldova. The Agrarians, while more moderate than the Socialists, still accused Romania of "imperialism" and promoted the terms "Moldovan people" and "Moldovan language".

The 2001 parliamentary elections, won by the Party of Communists of the Republic of Moldova, initially brought a series of attempts to raise Russian to the status of a state language. However, the project was dropped by popular opposition.

Relations between the Moldovan and Romanian governments have initially included some tension as the Moldovan government led by President Vladimir Voronin accused Romania of committing imperialism, specifically declaring that "Romania has remained the only empire in Europe, consisting of Moldavia, Dobruja and Transylvania". Nevertheless, in the recent past relations have improved and President Voronin as well as Romanian President Traian Băsescu have called for cooperation between the two sovereign states.

In 2006, the Gheorghe Asachi Romanian-French School was forced by the government to change its name to the Gheorghe Asachi Moldovan-French School. Critics argued that the government acted unilaterally and discriminated against Romanians, as other schools such as the Necui-Levitski Russian-Ukrainian School were allowed to continue using that name. In protest, four high school students from Asachi replaced the new high school sign with another with the old name. They were charged with "group-committed aggravated hooliganism".

In Transnistria, the situation is considered to be far worse than the rest of Moldova. After the 1992 war, the Romanian population was substantially persecuted, causing at least 5,000 to 10,000 Romanians to flee the region. Although the number of Romanians in Transnistria is significant, Romanian is almost never used in public.

Romanian schools comprise about 11% of the total schools in Transnistria. Most of the schools are forced to teach in the Cyrillic script and use outdated, 40-year-old, communist-era books, and 6 schools are permitted to teach in Romanian using the Latin script; however, pressure is often put on the institutions to close. The 2004 school crisis is a prime example of this, when the pro-Russian government in Tiraspol forcefully attempted to close down 2 of the schools. In the orphanage of Tighina, Romanian children returning from vacations found the orphanage locked by police. After spending a night outdoors, they forced their way into the building and had to stay there without water and electricity for a few months, until pressure from the Moldovan and Romanian governments and from the Organization for Security and Co-operation in Europe (OSCE) made the conflict get resolved. Numerous Romanian parents were arrested or fired from their jobs for their political views and their determination to keep their children in Romanian-language schools.

Citizens who express pro-Romanian or pro-Moldovan attitudes are likewise persecuted in Transnistria. The Ilie Ilașcu group is the most commonly known and well-documented of organisation.

=== Ukraine ===
Chernivtsi Oblast, as well as Odesa Oblast and the Tiachiv and Rakhiv raions (districts) of Zakarpattia Oblast (Transcarpathia), are the regions in Ukraine with considerable Romanian minorities, according to the 2001 Ukrainian Census.

The Ukrainian Census of 2001 was criticized by Dr. Ion Popescu, leader of the National Council of the Interregional Union of the Romanian Community in Ukraine and also one of the authors of the Constitution of Ukraine, who claims that the very existence of the classification of Moldovans as a separate ethnic group in census results is a "continuation of the Stalinist and Soviet policies of artificially dividing Romanians into Romanians and Moldovans". However, the response to the census question about the ethnicity had to be written in into the census form rather than picked from a pre-determined set of choices and the census respondents were free to claim their ethnicity as they wished not to respond to this or any other particular census question or not answer any questions at all; besides, no allegation of counting fraud were ever brought up. It is therefore unclear if Dr. Popescu criticizes the way in which the census was conducted or the way in which data was processed.

The number of Romanian students at Chernivtsi University declined sharply in Soviet times. In 1991–92, the last year of Soviet rule, the number of Romanian students was only 4.44% (434 out of 9,769) . Among teaching faculty, under-representation of Romanians is also evident. The breakdown by nationalities (in the same year) reveals: Ukrainian teachers 465 (77.1%), Russians 102 (16.9%), Moldovans 9 (1.4%), Romanians 7 (1.1%), Belarusians 6 (0.9%), etc. Even after Ukrainian independence, the number of Romanian students at the University continued to decline, to only 3.9% in 1992–93, which is much less than the overall percentage of Romanians in the region's general population. Since 1997, arrangements have been made for some students to study at universities in Romania. In 2001 the Christian-Democratic Alliance of the Romanians from Ukraine reported that Romanians in Chernivtsi lack an opportunity to study at the university level in their native language.

However, according to the Ukrainian Constitution adopted after its 1991 independence, Ukrainian is the only state language in the country, and the state higher education system was switched to Ukrainian, according to the common practice in many countries worldwide and this practice was not directed specifically at the Romanian population. For example, the majority of Ukrainian universities do not provide education in Russian either, despite the fact that Russian is the native language of a much more considerable part of the population in Ukraine.

At the same time, there are schools teaching Romanian as a primary language, as well as newspapers, TV, and radio broadcasting in Romanian , , . Future teachers for Romanian schools are trained in at the Chernivtsi University in the fields of Romanian philology, mathematics, and physics . Romanian organizations still complain that despite this, 19 villages inhabited by Romanians have been deprived of schooling in their native language, therefore creating a worse situation than that which existed under the repressive Soviet regime . However, the existence of the Romanian-language schools in Ukraine is a polarizing topic in the Ukrainian society, since many Ukrainians falsely claim that "a Romanianization of Chernivtsi Oblast" is taking place, while others claim that Romanians deserve these schools, since they are a native, but also loyal minority to the Ukrainian state.

The 2025 celebration of the Romanian Language Day in the Chernivtsi Oblast also fueled anti-Romanian sentiment, with many Ukrainians accusing the Romanians of separatism and the "forced Romanianization of Northern Bukovina", also calling them "occupants". The same happened when Romanian was introduced as a secondary language at the largest highschool of Chernivtsi.

=== Yugoslavia and modern-day Serbia ===
The Timok Romanians speak the same Romanian language as is spoken to the north, in Romania. However, the Serbian authorities have pursued a policy of de-nationalization as they have slowly changed the term Romanian into "Vlach" through the years. The number of Vlachs in Serbia today is around 21,000 people.

In 2004, there was a dispute between the Serbian authorities and the Romanian community in the Timok Valley when Bojan Aleksandrović, a Romanian Orthodox priest decided to build a small church where he would hold services in Romanian.

In the town of Vršac, the Romanian local television station door was vandalized with the inscription "Out Romanians, Serbia!!!" (Serbian: Napolje Rumuni, Srbija!!!).

=== Romania ===
In 2013 accusations of discrimination in Covasna surfaced against Hungarian students and teachers. During a ceremony celebrating the Hungarian National Day, some Romanian students wearing the Romanian flag were physically assaulted by older students, and threatened by teachers with punishment for wearing the national symbol. As a result, the Romanian human rights organisation ActiveWatch issued a statement condemning the actions of the school's administration, which it considers a blunt infringement of human rights and freedom of expression.

=== Switzerland ===
In 2009, the right-wing Swiss People's Party (SVP) ran an anti-immigration campaign against Romanians and Bulgarian emigrants, distributing and displaying banners depicting citizens of these countries as "crows".

=== United Kingdom ===
In June 2009, having had their windows broken and death threats made against them, twenty Romanian-Roma families were forced from their homes in Lisburn Road, Belfast, in Northern Ireland. Up to 115 people, including women and children, were forced to seek refuge in a local church hall after being attacked. They were later moved by the authorities to a safer location. An anti-racist rally in the city on 15 June was attacked by local youths chanting neo-Nazi slogans.

Following the arrest of three local youths in relation to the attacks, the church where the Romanians had been given shelter was badly vandalised. Using 'emergency funds', Northern Irish government assisted most of the victims to return to Romania.

In 2013, Romanian ambassador to the United Kingdom Ion Jinga claimed that portions of the British media had written a series of unduly negative articles about Romanian immigrants. He claimed that these articles portrayed Romanian immigrants as being "invaders", criminals who abused social benefits and being involved in the 2013 horse meat scandal. Jinga responded to these alleged claims in a series of interviews and articles in British newspapers, radio and television, presenting his views on the professional value of Romanian immigrants and their, in his view, significant contribution to the British economy. He also blamed UKIP for inciting anti-Romanian prejudice and violent attacks against Romanian immigrants.

In 2013, the Daily Express launched a "crusade" against new EU migrants from Bulgaria and Romania. The article, published on the 31st of October, declared that "Britain is full and fed up. Today join your Daily Express Crusade to stop new flood of Romanian and Bulgarian migrants". UKIP leader Nigel Farage declared that he had signed the petition, and urged others to do the same. Romanian politician Cătălin Ivan expressed "outrage" at the campaign.

=== European Union ===
Anti-Romanian sentiment in the European Union refers to the hatred, fear or discrimination of Romanian emigrants and citizens within the European Union. Although Romania is a member of the EU, Romanian emigrants have faced ethnic profiling in various European countries and open discrimination in countries like Italy, France, Germany, Belgium, Greece or Austria.

==== Netherlands ====
A Dutch right-wing political party (Party for Freedom (PVV)) launched a website aimed at gathering denunciations against Polish, Romanian, and Bulgarian nationals living in the Netherlands.

== See also ==
- Anti-Eastern Orthodox sentiment
- Ip massacre
- Nușfalău massacre
- Treznea massacre
- Vlach language

== Sources ==
- Molnár, Miklós (2001). A Concise History of Hungary. Cambridge University Press. ISBN 0 521 66142 0.
