= Ip massacre =

1940 massacre in Ip, Kingdom of Hungary

- Part of World War II
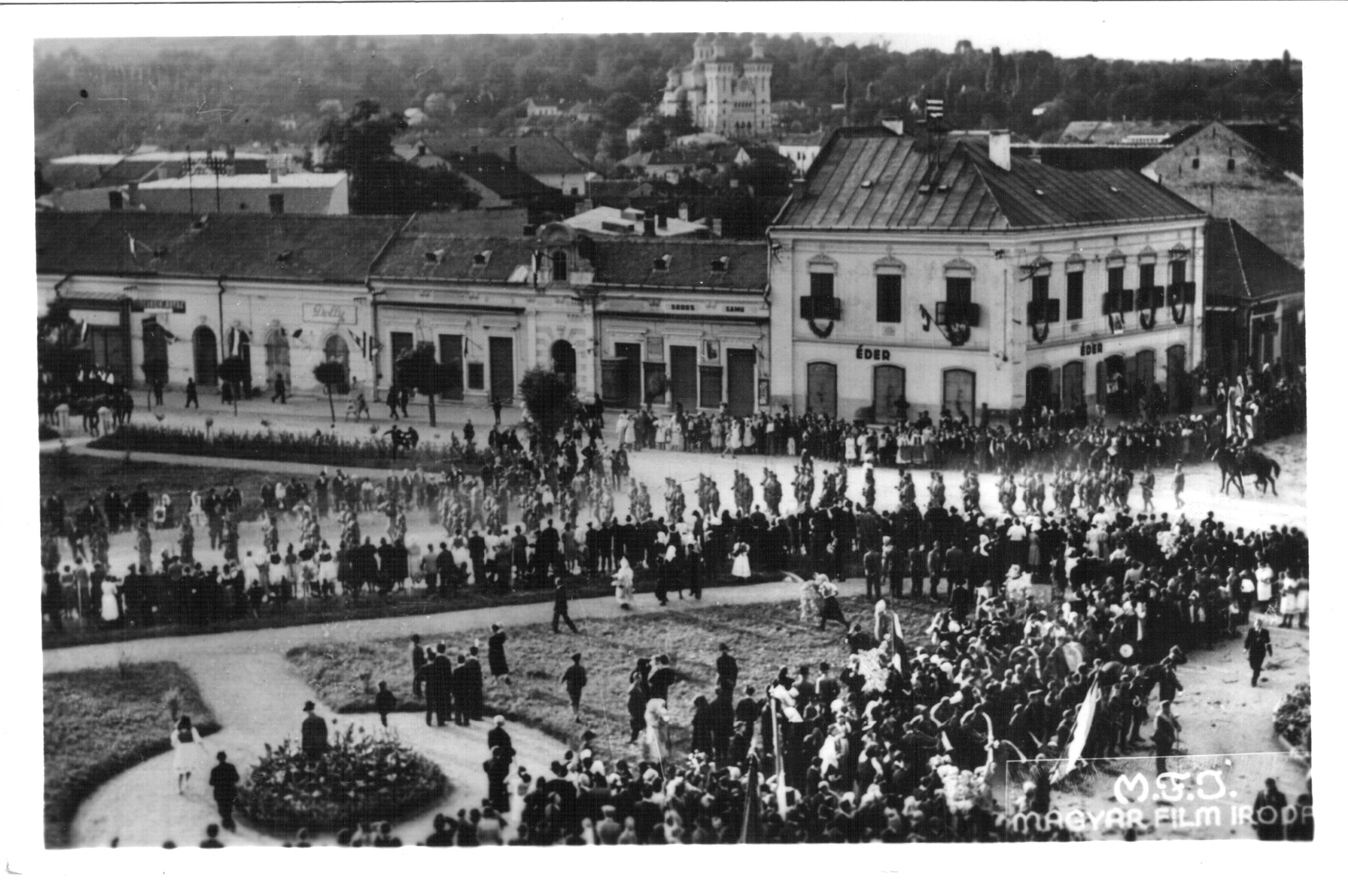
- Hungarian troops marching in nearby Zalău, five days earlier
- Location: 47°13′45″N 22°36′22″E; Ip, Kingdom of Hungary (present-day Ip, Sălaj, Romania)
- Date: 13–14 September 1940; 03:00 (CET)
- Attack type: Ethnic cleansing and reprisal
- Weapons: Machine guns, rifles, revolvers, bayonets
- Deaths: 152–158 ethnic Romanians and 16 reported deserters
- Perpetrators: Royal Hungarian Army, locals, Nemzetőrség members

The Ip massacre was the mass killing of around 150 ethnic Romanians by the Royal Hungarian Army on 14 September 1940, in Ipp, (today Ip, Sălaj County), Northern Transylvania, and in nearby locations and surrounding areas. After two Hungarian soldiers died in an accidental explosion in Ip, rumors spread that they had been killed by Romanians, and the killings were committed in response.

== Events ==
After the Second Vienna Award of 30 August 1940, as a result of German–Italian arbitration, northwestern Transylvania reverted to Hungary. The area ceded by Romania contained the northwestern part of the homonymous region and the Székely lands. A total of eight of the 23 Transylvanian counties that had been part of Romania during the interwar period were entirely alienated, and another three were split. Thus, Sălaj County was also attached to Hungary. On 7 September 1940 the Hungarian Second Army arrived at Ipp (present-day Ip) where they made a short stop. After preparing to leave, more acquired grenades exploded in one of the sling-carts and two soldiers died. It was quickly determined that negligent storage of the grenades had caused the accident, but rumors rapidly spread that it was a willful action.

On 8 September 1940, the Second Army entered the city of Zalău.

On 13 September, the military commander of the district of Szilágysomlyó (present-day Șimleu Silvaniei) was informed that armed Romanian groups were looting the nearby villages of Alsókaznacs, Felsőkaznacs, Márkaszék, Porc, Lecsmér, Somály, and Kémer (present-day Cosniciu de Jos, Cosniciu de Sus, Marca, Porț, Leșmir, Șumal, and Camăr). According to the report, their number was between 80–100. Based on this report, the 32nd Regiment stationed in Zilah (present-day Zalău) assigned a group to investigate the area. When they arrived in Szilágynagyfalu (present-day Nușfalău), they were informed of the deaths of the two soldiers. In retaliation, they raided the commune the same day.

After reconnaissance, 18 suspicious persons were found. According to official reports, 16 were executed because of their attempts to desert.. Overnight, Hungarian troops residing in the local school were shot at from the street with a machine gun around 03:00 am. Some witnesses claimed that the shooting came from a flat in the center, and five persons with machine guns were captured. In retaliation, between 152 and 158 ethnic Romanians were killed. The commander of the Hungarian troops, Lieutenant Zoltán Vasváry, perpetrated the massacre of civilians. Some sources have stated that the Hungarian Army was supported by local vigilantes.

The soldiers went house-to-house, shooting indiscriminately. On 14 September, in Somlyócsehi (present-day Cehei), one person was killed. In the nearby Felsőkaznacs and Szilágcseres forests (present-day Cosniciu de Sus and Cerișa) 55 persons were killed. According to some other sources, the area most affected was Sălaj, where 477 Romanians were massacred.

On September 14, at the order of Lt. Vasvári, a pit 24 meters long by 4 meters wide was dug in the village cemetery; the corpses of those killed in the massacre were buried head-to-head in two rows, with no religious ceremony.

== Trial ==
The facts were established by Decision no. 1 of the Northern Transylvania People's Tribunal (which sat in Cluj and was presided by Justice Nicolae Matei), in a public sentence from 13 March 1946. The findings of the Tribunal were as follows:

- Lieutenant Colonel Károly Lehotcsky, the military commander of Șimleu Silvaniei district, was found guilty of ordering reprisals against the Romanian inhabitants of Ip and nearby villages; he received a death sentence.
- István Faragó, a landowner from Ip and commander of a local militia was accused of inducing Lehotcsky to order those repressive measures, but was acquitted. Adalbert Újhelyi was also found to have participated in this inducement, but he had died before the trial.
- Lt. Zoltán Vasváry was found guilty of commanding the unit that carried out the massacre, and was sentenced to death.
- Fifteen locals were accused of cooperating with the Hungarian soldiers in perpetrating the massacre. Of those, László K. Béres, Ferenc I. Csepei, Arpád Ősz, and István Pincés were sentenced to 25 years of forced labor; Zsigmond P. Béres, Imre Bíró Jr., Ferenc Borzási, Zsigmond Csepei, Bálint Kisfalusi, and Mihály Soós to 20 years of forced labor, Sándor Csepei to 20 years of prison, Imre Bíró Sr. and Sándor Kisfalusi to 15 years of prison, and Miklós Béres to five years of prison, while Pál B. Fazekas was acquitted.

== See also ==
- List of massacres in Hungary
- List of massacres in Romania
- Luduș massacre
- Nușfalău massacre
- Sărmașu massacre
- Treznea massacre
