= Nușfalău massacre =

Massacre of Romanians at Nușfalău by Hungarians

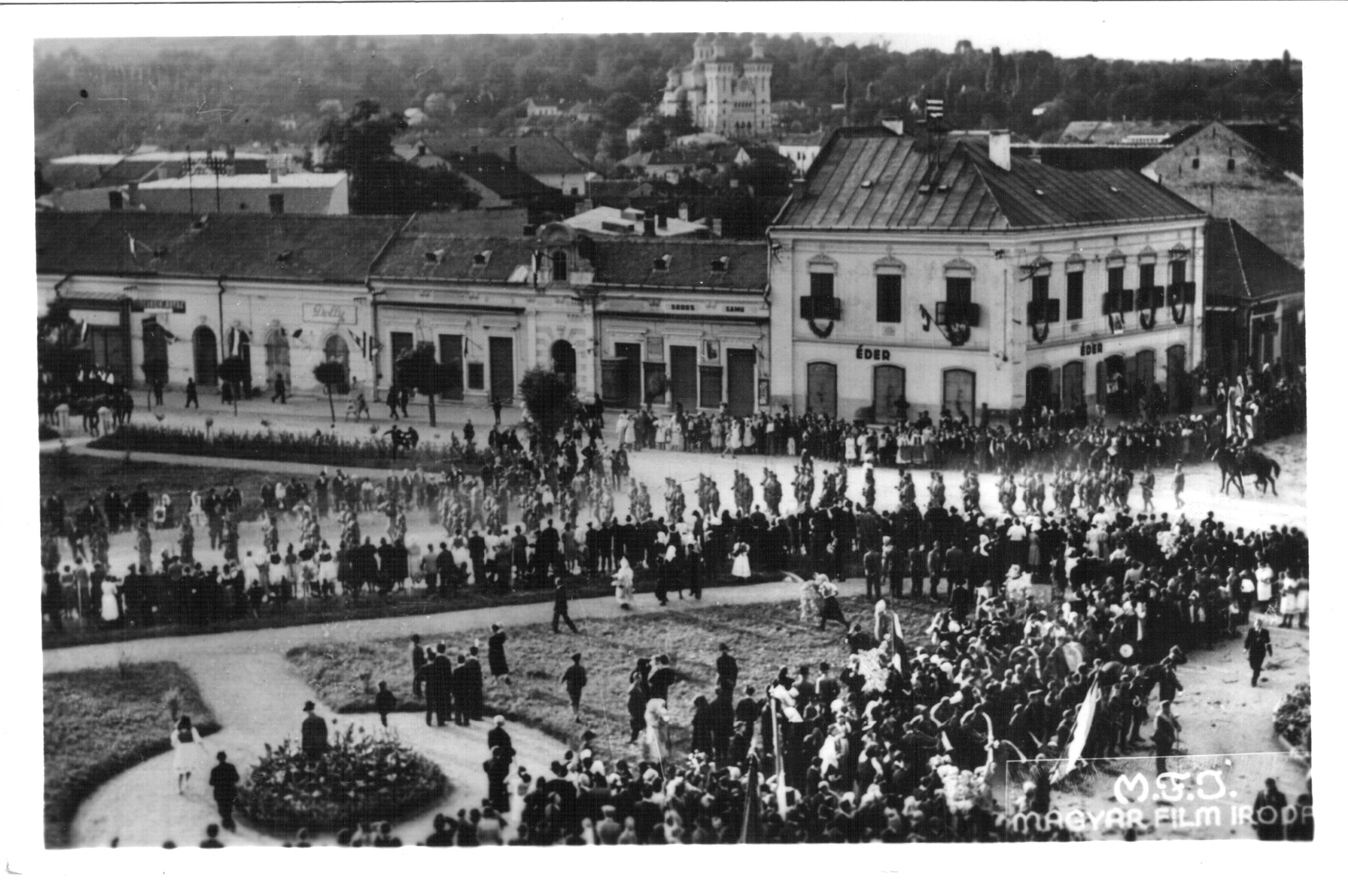
- Hungarian troops marching in nearby Zalău, that same day
- Location: 47°11′58″N 22°42′28″E; Szilágynagyfalu, Kingdom of Hungary (present-day Nușfalău, Sălaj County, Romania)
- Date: 8 September 1940 (CET)
- Attack type: Massacre
- Weapon: Bayonets
- Deaths: 11 ethnic Romanians
- Perpetrators: Royal Hungarian Army, locals

The Nușfalău massacre occurred in the village of Szilágynagyfalu (today Nușfalău, Sălaj County, Romania) in Northern Transylvania. It happened on 8 September 1940, when a Hungarian soldier with the support of some natives tortured and killed eleven people (two women and nine men) of Romanian ethnicity from a nearby village, who were passing through the area.

== Background ==
At the Second Vienna Award of 30 August 1940, as a result of German–Italian arbitration, Romania was forced to cede to Hungary the northwestern part of Transylvania, which included Sălaj County, as well as the Székely Land. Under the terms of the award, Romania had 14 days to evacuate those territories and hand them over to Hungary, but Hungarian troops came across the border earlier, on 5 September. On 7 September, the Hungarian Second Army arrived at Șimleu Silvaniei and Ip, and on 8 September at Zalău, the seat of Sălaj County.

== Massacre ==
On the morning of 8 September 1940, a group of eleven people of Romanian ethnicity were leaving the village of Szilágynagyfalu (Nușfalău), after spending the night there at the house of the mayor, Gheorghe Imrea. These people were from the village of Kozmaalmás, Bihar County (today Almașu Mare, part of Balc, Bihor County, Romania), some 26 kilometres (16 mi) away. The group was composed of two women (Silvia Costaș and Maria Costea) and nine men (Traian Bencheu, Gavril Bogza, Dumitru Costaș, Nicolae Costaș, Dumitru Gaceu, Aurel Jarca, Vasile Matei, Dumitru Somei, and Gavril Turdea). While they were leaving the place, they were stopped by Zoltán Szinkovitz, a native Hungarian from the village, and a Hungarian soldier. They took the Romanians to the center of the village and started registering them and confiscated their personal belongings. Then, the Romanians were beaten and injured with a bayonet. Next, the two women were released, while the nine men were taken in a military car 500 metres (1,600 feet) away from Zăuan. There, they were killed with a lunge in the heart with the bayonets. The two women were captured by two other Hungarian natives and were taken to the site of the massacre, where they were also killed. The corpses of the 11 victims were quickly buried and covered only with leaves; a proper burial in the cemetery of Nușfalău took place a few days later, at the insistence of the villagers, after the corpses had begun to decompose.

== Trial ==
The facts were established by Decision no. 1 of the Northern Transylvania People's Tribunal (which sat in Cluj and was presided by Justice Nicolae Matei), in a public sentence from 13 March 1946. One of the accused, Zoltán Szinkovitz, was convicted of inciting and participating in the Nușfalău massacre. Two other ethnic Hungarians, János Szabó and János Fábián, were found guilty of aiding and abetting the crimes, and were punished, but the Hungarian soldier who bayonetted the male victims was never identified. One of the accused, János F. Tütös (who was also present at the Nușfalău massacre), was acquitted of the charges.

== See also ==
- List of massacres in Romania
- Ip massacre
- Treznea massacre
