= Second Vienna Award =

1940 territorial settlement between the kingdoms of Romania and Hungary

Part of Hungary in World War II
- Map of territories that were reassigned to Hungary in 1938 to 1941. The Second Vienna Award highlighted in green.
- Context: Territorial dispute over Transylvania between Hungary and Romania, spread of Axis influence during World War II
- Signed: 30 August 1940
- Location: Belvedere Palace, Vienna, Germany
- Signatories: (Nazi Germany) Joachim von Ribbentrop; (Kingdom of Italy) Galeazzo Ciano; (Kingdom of Hungary (1920–1946)) István Csáky; (Kingdom of Romania) Mihail Manoilescu
- Parties: Germany; Italy; Hungary; Romania

The Second Vienna Award was the second of two territorial disputes that were arbitrated by Nazi Germany and Fascist Italy. On 30 August 1940, they assigned the territory of Northern Transylvania, including all of Maramureș and part of Crișana, from the Kingdom of Romania to the Kingdom of Hungary.

== Background ==
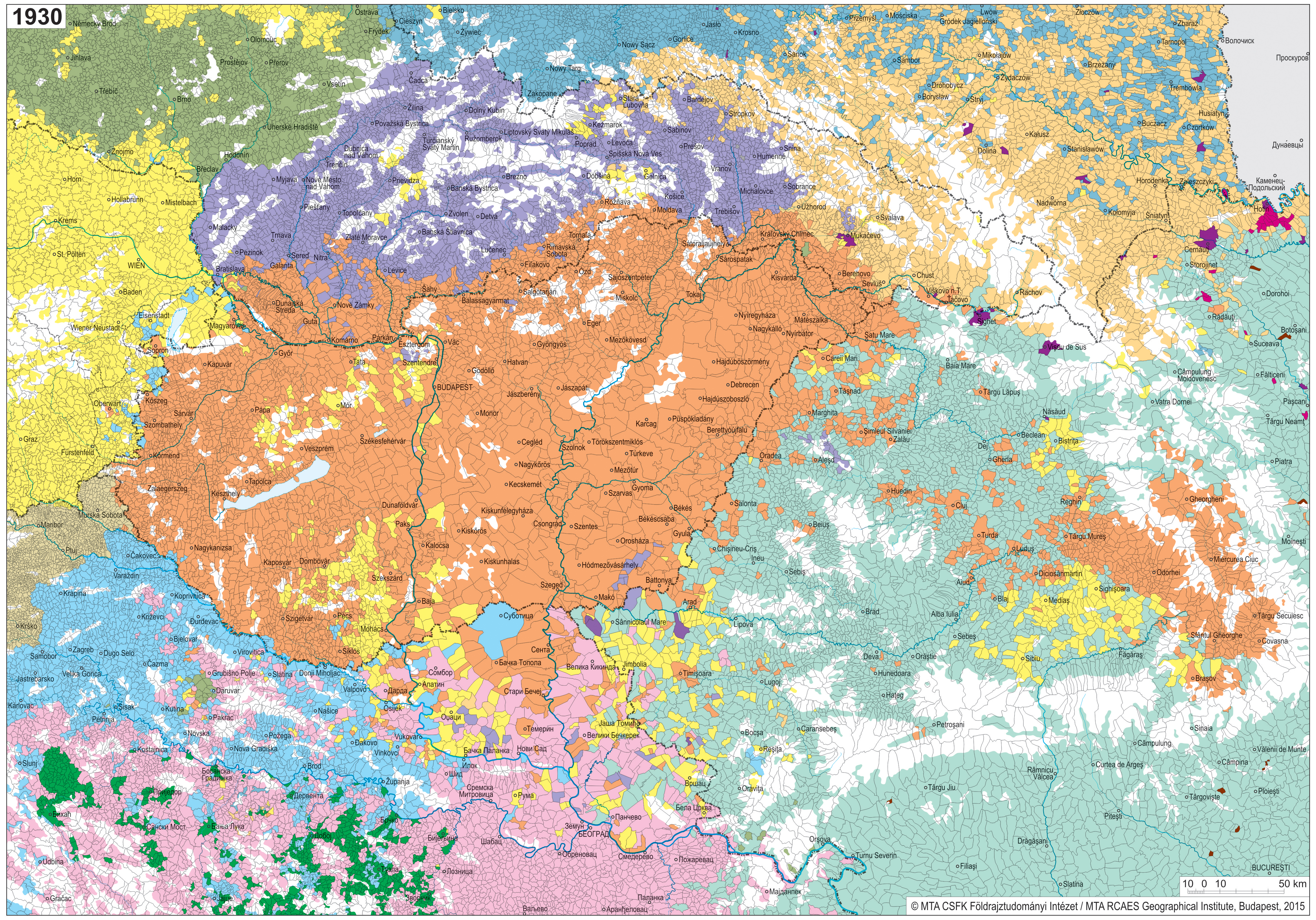
Ethnic map of the Kingdom of Hungary in 1930 and the Carpatho-Pannonian area, based on the Hungarian (1930), Czechoslovak (1930), Romanian (1930), Yugoslav (1931), Polish (1931), and Austrian (1934) censuses. Hungarians Croats Germans Serbs Slovaks Slovenes Romanians Ruthenians Uninhabited

After World War I, the multiethnic Kingdom of Hungary was divided by the 1920 Treaty of Trianon to form several new nation states, but Hungary noted that the new state borders did not follow ethnic boundaries. The new nation state of Hungary was about a third the size of prewar Hungary, and millions of ethnic Hungarians were left outside the new Hungarian borders. Many historically important areas of Hungary were assigned to other countries, and the distribution of natural resources was uneven. The various non-Hungarian populations generally saw the treaty as justice for their historically marginalised nationalities, but the Hungarians considered the treaty to have been deeply unjust, a national humiliation and a real tragedy.

The treaty and its consequences dominated Hungarian public life and political culture in the interwar period, and the Hungarian government swung more and more to the right. Eventually, under Regent Miklós Horthy, Hungary established close relations with Benito Mussolini's Italy and Adolf Hitler's Germany.

The good relations with Germany and Italy allowed Hungary to regain southern Czechoslovakia in the First Vienna Award of 1938 and Subcarpathia in 1939. However, neither that nor the subsequent military conquest of Carpathian Ruthenia in 1939 satisfied Hungarian political ambitions. The awards allocated only a fraction of the territories lost by the Treaty of Trianon, and the loss resented the most by the Hungarians was that of Transylvania, which had been ceded to Romania.

In late June 1940, the Romanian government gave in to a Soviet ultimatum and allowed Moscow to take over both Bessarabia and Northern Bukovina, which had been incorporated into Romania after World War I, as well as the Hertsa region. The territorial loss was dreadful from Romania's perspective, but its government preferred that to an unwinnable military conflict with the Soviets. Hungary's government, however, interpreted Romania's cession of land as an admission that it would no longer insist upon its territorial integrity under pressure. The Soviet occupation of Bessarabia and Northern Bukovina thus inspired Budapest to escalate its efforts to resolve "the question of Transylvania". Hungary hoped to gain as much of Transylvania as possible, but the Romanians would have none of it and submitted only a small region for consideration. Eventually, Hungarian-Romanian negotiations fell through entirely. As a result, Romania and Hungary were "browbeaten" into accepting Axis arbitration.

Meanwhile, the Romanian government had acceded to Italy's request for territorial cessions to Bulgaria, another German-aligned neighbour. On 7 September, under the Treaty of Craiova, the "Cadrilater" (southern Dobruja) was ceded by Romania to Bulgaria.

== Award ==
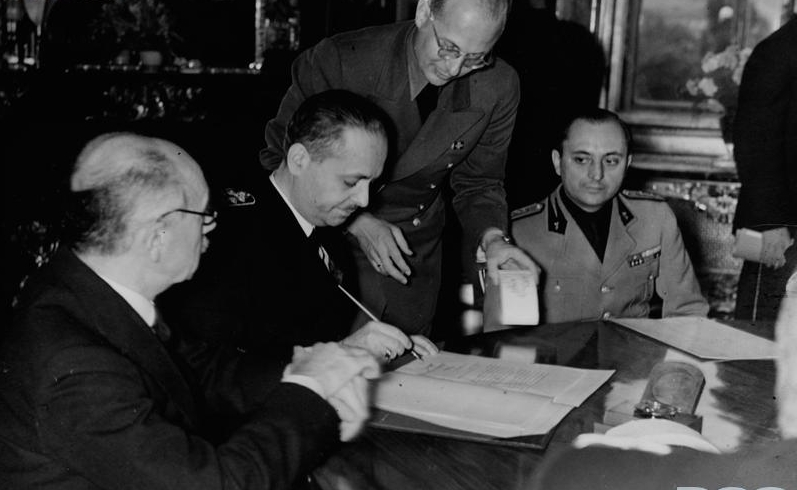
Hungarian Foreign Minister István Csáky signing the agreement, with Romanian Foreign Minister Mihail Manoilescu next to him

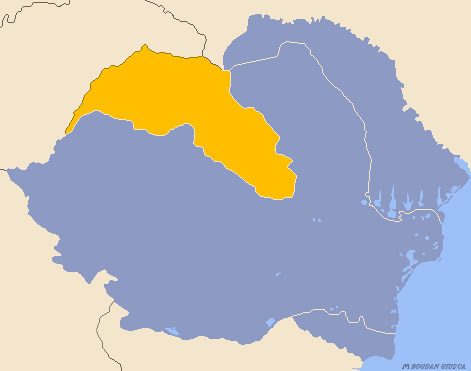
Romania in 1940, with Northern Transylvania highlighted in yellow

On 1 July 1940, Romania repudiated the Anglo-French guarantee of 13 April 1939, which had become worthless following the fall of France. The next day, King Carol II of Romania suggested to Hitler that Germany dispatch a military mission to Romania and renew the alliance of 1883. Germany used Romania's new desperation to force a revision of the territorial settlement produced by the Paris Peace Conference of 1919 in favour of Germany's old allies: Hungary and Bulgaria. In an exchange of letters between Carol and Hitler (5–15 July), Carol insisted that no territorial exchange occur without a population exchange, and Hitler conditioned German goodwill towards Romania on Romania's having good relations with Hungary and Bulgaria. The Romanian foreign minister was Mihail Manoilescu; the German minister plenipotentiary in Bucharest was Wilhelm Fabricius.

In accordance with German wishes, Romania began negotiations with Hungary at Turnu Severin on 16 August. The initial Hungarian claim was 69,000 km^{2} (27,000 sq mi) of territory with 3,803,000 inhabitants, almost two-thirds of whom were Romanian. Talks were broken off on 24 August. The German and Italian governments then proposed an arbitration, which was characterised in the minutes of the Romanian Crown Council of 29 August as "communications with an ultimative character made by the German and Italian governments".

The Romanians accepted, and Foreign Ministers Joachim von Ribbentrop of Germany and Galeazzo Ciano of Italy met on 30 August 1940 at the Belvedere Palace in Vienna. They reduced the Hungarian demands to 43,492 km^{2} (16,792 sq mi), with a population of 2,667,007. The treaty was signed by Hungarian Foreign Minister István Csáky and Romanian Foreign Minister Mihail Manoilescu. The Romanian Crown Council met overnight on 30–31 August to accept the arbitration. At the meeting, Iuliu Maniu demanded that Carol abdicate and that the Romanian Army to resist the Hungarian takeover of northern Transylvania. His demands were pragmatically rejected.

Population statistics in Northern Transylvania and the changes after the award are presented in detail in the next section. Southern Transylvania, with 2,274,600 Romanians and 363,200 Hungarians, remained part of Romania.

=== The text of the Second Vienna Award ===
1. The final route of the border line, which separates Romania from Hungary, will correspond to the one marked on the geographical map attached here. A Romanian-Hungarian commission will determine the details of the route on the spot.
2. The Romanian territory assigned to Hungary will be evacuated by Romanian troops within 15 days and handed over in good order. The different phases of the evacuation and the occupation, as well as their modalities will be fixed within a Romanian-Hungarian commission. The Hungarian and Romanian governments will ensure that the evacuation and occupation are carried out in full order.
3. All Romanian subjects, settled on this day on the territory to be ceded by Romania, acquire Hungarian nationality without any formalities. They will be allowed to opt in favor of the Romanian nationality within six months. Those people who will exercise this right, will leave the Hungarian territory within an additional period of one year and will be allowed to move into Romania. They will be able to take, without any hindrance, their movable property, to liquidate their immovable property, until the moment of their departure, and to take with them the resulting product. If the liquidation fails, these people will be compensated by Hungary. Hungary will resolve all issues related to the transplantation of optants in a broad and accommodating manner.
4. Romanian subjects of Hungarian race, established in the territory ceded in 1919 by Hungary to Romania and which remained under the sovereignty of the state, receive the right to opt for Hungarian nationality, within a period of six months. The principles set out in paragraph 3 shall also apply to people exercising this right.
5. The Hungarian government solemnly undertakes to fully assimilate the Romanian people with other Hungarian subjects, who, on the basis of the above arbitration, will acquire Hungarian nationality. On the other hand, the Romanian government takes the same solemn commitment regarding its Hungarian subjects, who will remain on the Romanian territory.
6. The details resulting from the transfer of sovereignty will be regulated by a direct agreement between the Romanian and Hungarian governments.
7. Should any difficulties or doubts arise during the application of this arbitration, the Romanian and Hungarian governments will seek to reach an agreement directly. If no agreement is reached, the dispute will be submitted to the governments of the Reich and Italy, which will adopt a final solution.

== Statistics ==
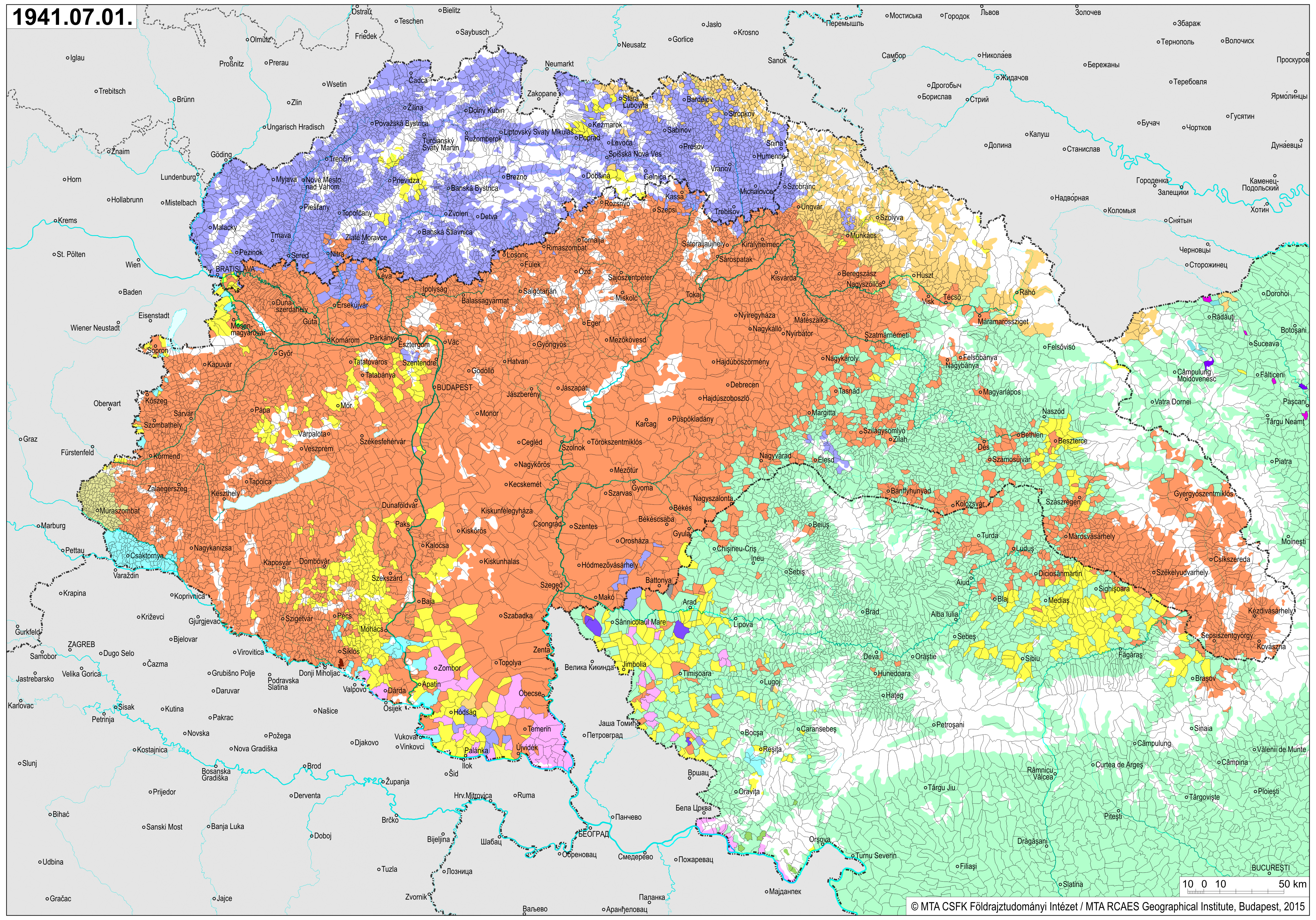
Ethnic map of the Kingdom of Hungary in 1941 and the Carpatho-Pannonian area, based on the Slovak (1940), Hungarian (1941), and Romanian (1941) censuses. Hungarians Croats Germans Serbs Slovaks Slovenes Romanians Ruthenians Uninhabited

The territory in question covered an area of 43,104 square kilometres (16,643 sq mi). The 1930 Romanian census registered for the region a population of 2,393,300. In 1941, the Hungarian authorities conducted a new census, which registered a total population of 2,578,100. Both censuses asked language and nationality separately. The results of both censuses are summarised in this table:

Major ethnic groups	1930 Romanian census		1941 Hungarian census	
Major ethnic groups	Nationality	Language	Nationality	Language
Hungarian	912,500 (38.13%)	1,007,200 (42.08%)	1,380,500 (53.55%)	1,344,000 (52.13%)
Romanian	1,176,900 (49.17%)	1,165,800 (48.71%)	1,029,000 (39.91%)	1,068,700 (41.45%)
German	68,300 (2.85%)	59,700 (2.49%)	44,600 (1.73%)	47,300 (1.83%)
Jewish (Yiddish language)	138,800 (5.80%)	99,600 (4.16%)	47,400 (1.83%)	48,500 (1.88%)
Other	96,800 (4.04%)	61,000 (2.55%)	76,600 (2.97%)	69,600 (2.70%)
Total	2,393,300		2,578,100	

Ethnic map of Northern Transylvania

Historian Keith Hitchins summarised the situation created by the award:

Far from settling matters, the Vienna Award had exacerbated relations between Romania and Hungary. It did not solve the nationality problem by separating all Magyars from all Romanians. Some 1,150,000 to 1,300,000 Romanians, or 48 per cent to over 50 per cent of the population of the ceded territory, depending upon whose statistics are used, remained north of the new frontier, while about 500,000 Magyars (other Hungarian estimates go as high as 800,000, Romanian as low as 363,000) continued to reside in the south.

Apart from natural population growth, the differences between the censuses were caused by other complex reasons like migration, the assimilation of Jews and bilingual speakers. According to Hungarian registrations, 100,000 Hungarian refugees had arrived in North Transylvania from South Transylvania by January 1941. And almost as many Hungarians arrived from Trianon Hungary in North Transylvania.

On the other hand, nearly the same number of Romanians left to Southern Transylvania by February 1941, according to the incomplete registration of North Transylvanian refugees that was carried out by the Romanian government. Also, a further fall in the total population suggests that a further 40,000 to 50,000 Romanians moved from North Transylvania to South Transylvania, including refugees who were omitted from the official registration for various reasons.

Hungarian gains by assimilation were also balanced by losses for other groups of native speakers, such as Jews. The shift of languages was most typical among bilingual Romanians and Hungarians, however, in Máramaros and Szatmár Counties, dozens of settlements had many people who had declared themselves as Romanian in 1930 but now identified themselves as Hungarian in 1941 although they had not spoken any Hungarian even in 1910.

== Aftermath ==
Recovery of Northern Transylvania
Date	5–13 September 1940
Location	Northern Transylvania (today in Romania)
Result	Hungarian occupation of the region and incorporation to the state
Territorial changes	Northern Transylvania

Belligerents
Romania	Hungary; Supported by: Germany; Italy

Commanders and leaders
Unknown	(Kingdom of Hungary (1920–1946)) Miklós Horthy (Kingdom of Hungary (1920–1946)) Vilmos Nagy (Kingdom of Hungary (1920–1946)) Gusztáv Jány

Strength
Unknown	First Army; Second Army

Casualties and losses
Romanian military: Unknown; Romanian civilians: Hundreds killed	Hungarian military: 4 killed (presumably); Several tanks damaged Hungarian civilians: Unknown

Romania had 14 days to evacuate the concerned territories and to assign them to Hungary. The Hungarian troops stepped across the Trianon borders on 5 September. The Regent of Hungary, Miklós Horthy, also attended in the entry. The troops reached the pre-Trianon border, which completed the territorial recovery process, on 13 September.

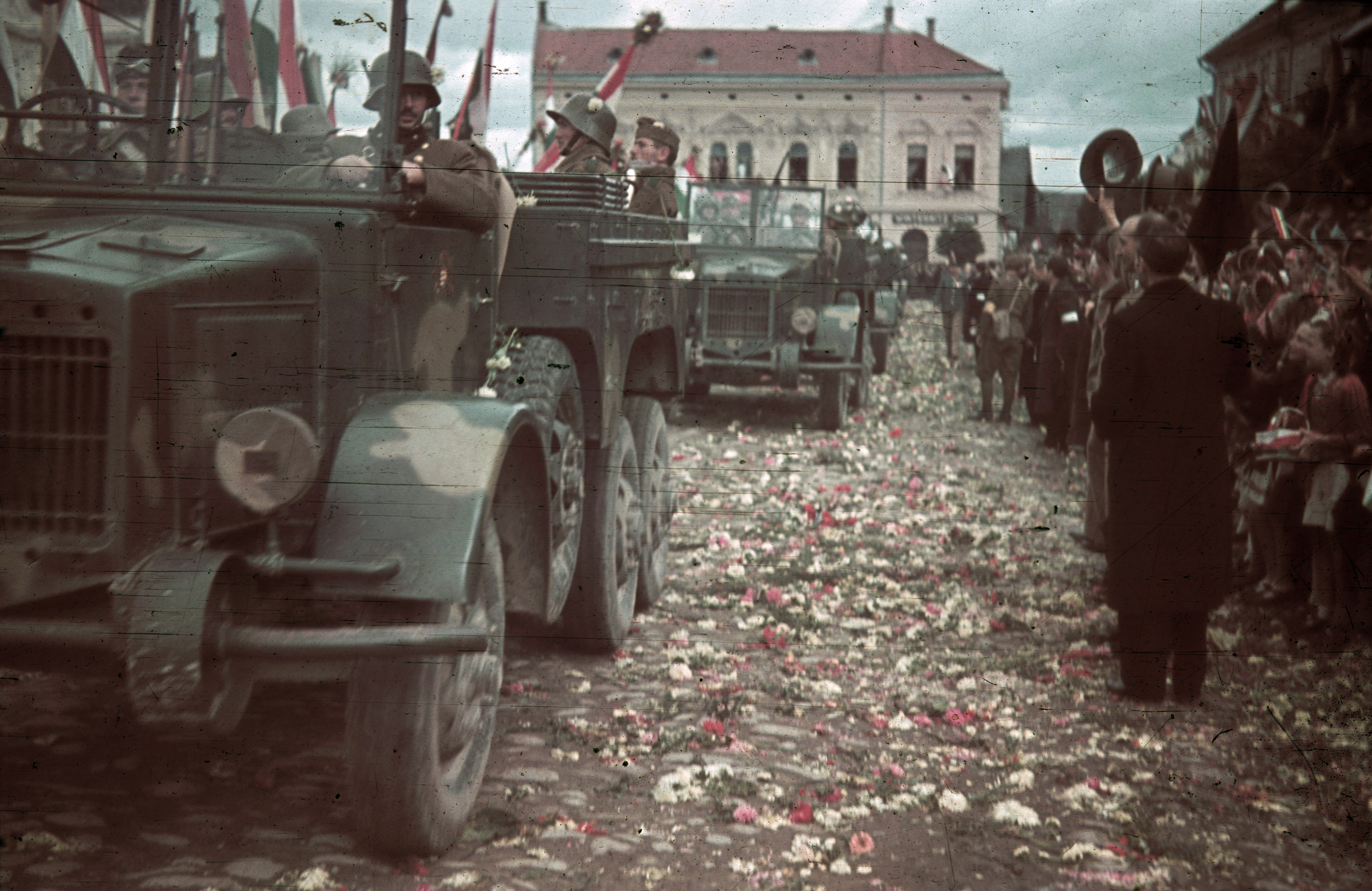
Crowds throw flowers to welcome the Hungarian troops into Kézdivásárhely (Târgu Secuiesc)

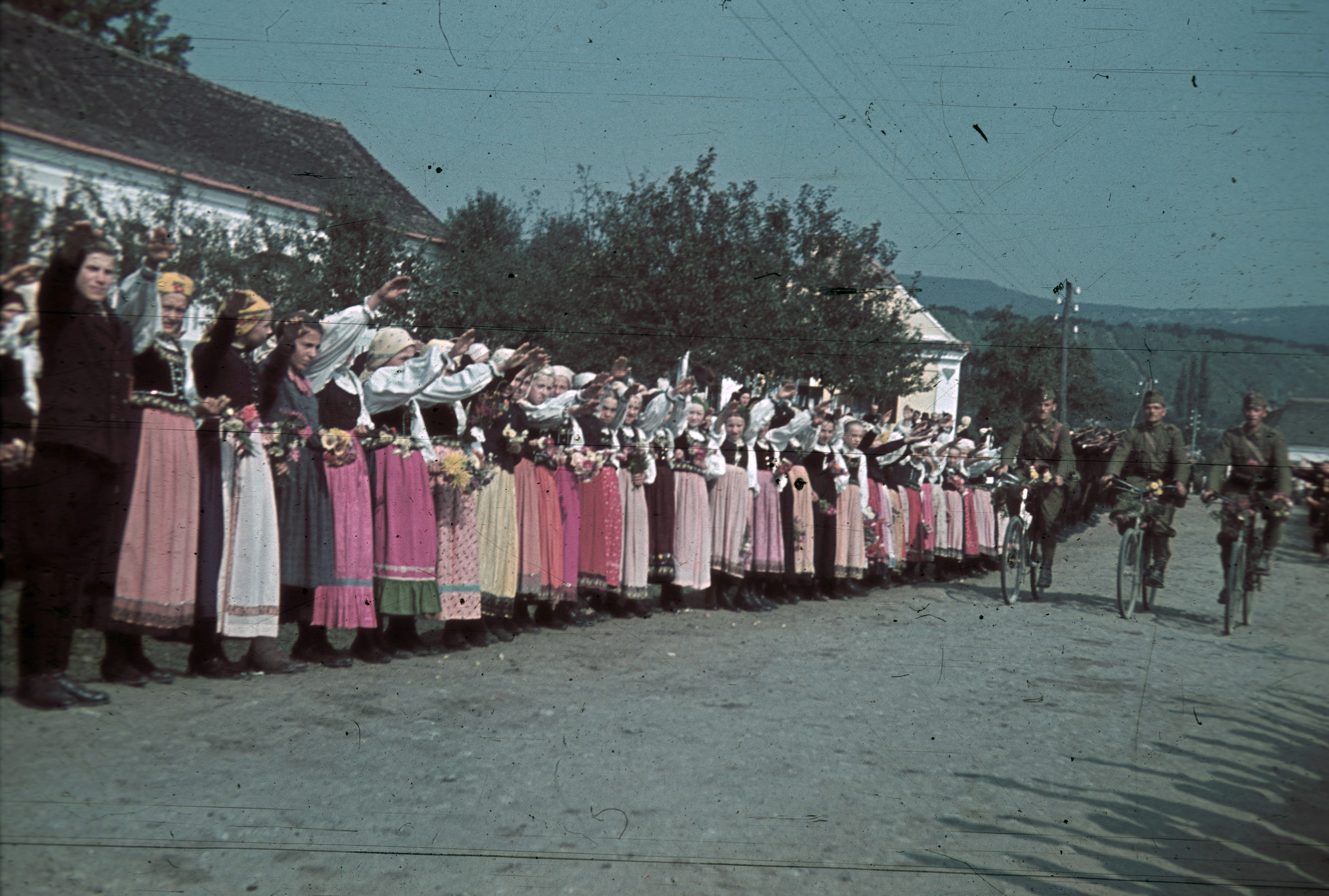
Ethnic Hungarians give the fascist or 'Roman' salute while they welcome the Hungarian troops.

Generally, the ethnic Hungarian population welcomed the troops and regarded the separation from Romania as a liberation. The large ethnic Romanian community that found itself under the Hungarian occupation had nothing to celebrate, as it considered the Second Vienna Award a return to the long Hungarian rule. Upon entering the awarded territory, the Royal Hungarian Army committed massacres against the Romanian population, including the following:

- The Treznea massacre. On 9 September, in the village of Treznea (Hungarian: Ördögkút), some Hungarian troops made a 4 km detour from the Zalău–Cluj route of the Hungarian Army and started firing at will on locals of all ages, killed many of them and partially destroyed the Orthodox church. The official Hungarian sources then recorded that 87 Romanians and 6 Jews were killed, including the local Orthodox priest and the Romanian local teacher with his wife, but some Romanian sources give as many as 263 locals who were killed. Some Hungarian historians claim that the killings came in retaliation after the Hungarian troops were fired upon by inhabitants after they had allegedly been incited by the local Romanian Orthodox priest, but the claims are not supported by the accounts of several witnesses. The motivation of the 4 km detour of the Hungarian troops from the rest of the Hungarian Army is still a point of contention, but most evidence points towards the local noble Ferenc Bay, who had lost a large part of his estates to peasants in the 1920s, as most of the violence was directed towards the peasants living on his former estate.
- The Ip massacre. In similar circumstances, 159 local villagers were killed on 13 and 14 September 1940 by Hungarian troops in the village of Ip (Hungarian: Szilágyipp). The commander of the Hungarian troops who perpetrated the massacre of civilians was Lieutenant Zoltán Vasváry. On September 14, on the order of Vasváry, a pit 24 m by 4 m wide was dug in the village cemetery; the corpses of those killed in the massacre were buried head-to-head in two rows, with no religious ceremony.
- The Nușfalău massacre occurred in the village of Nușfalău (Hungarian: Szilágynagyfalu) on 8 September 1940, when a Hungarian soldier, with the support of some natives, tortured and killed eleven ethnic Romanians (two women and nine men) from a nearby village who were passing through the area.

The circumstances and the exact number of casualties are disputed among historians. The retreat of the Romanian Army was also not free from incidents, which were mostly damaging infrastructure and destroying public documents.

=== Axis territorial guarantee ===
Germany did agree to guarantee Romania after the latter ceded Northern Transylvania to Hungary and Southern Dobruja to Bulgaria (Treaty of Craiova). This guarantee was successfully put to test a few months later. On 13 November 1940, Vyacheslav Molotov asked Hitler to endorse the Soviet annexation of South Bukovina. This was equivalent to Germany cancelling its guarantee of Romania, something obviously unacceptable to Berlin. As the Final Report of the Wiesel Commission put it: "Only Hitler's refusal saved the rest of Bukovina from being swallowed up, Russified, and lost to Romania forever.".

== Romanian statistics on abuses committed by Hungarian authorities ==
By 1941, there have been a total of 919 murders, 1,126 maimings, 4,126 beatings, 15,893 arrests, 124 desecrations, 78 individual and 447 collective home devastations of Romanians by the Hungarian authorities. Additionally, Romanians were deported to working camps, in Püspökladány 1,315 North Transylvanian Romanians were deported at the end of September 1940, a number well above the camp's maximum capacity. In the same month, other working camps for Romanians were established at Szamosfalva (now Someșeni) and Szászfenes (now Florești), near Kolozsvár (now Cluj).

During this period, Romanian schools also suffered. On the territory of the ceded part of Transylvania, there were 1,733 Romanian-language schools. After the Second Vienna Award, by 1941 there was only one Romanian-language school left in North Transylvania, in Năsăud.

However, in a few cases, there were also Hungarian locals who were involved in rescuing Romanian families. Among them is the case of József Gáll, who saved several Romanians from death during the Treznea Massacre. Or Sarolta Juhász from Omboztelke (now Mureșenii de Câmpie), who was killed while trying to protect the family of the Romanian priest Bujor.

If one excludes the Szekely area, 127,377 Jews were deported for extermination purposes, overwhelmingly to the Auschwitz death camp, 19,764 returned and 107,613 did not return.

== Carol II line ==
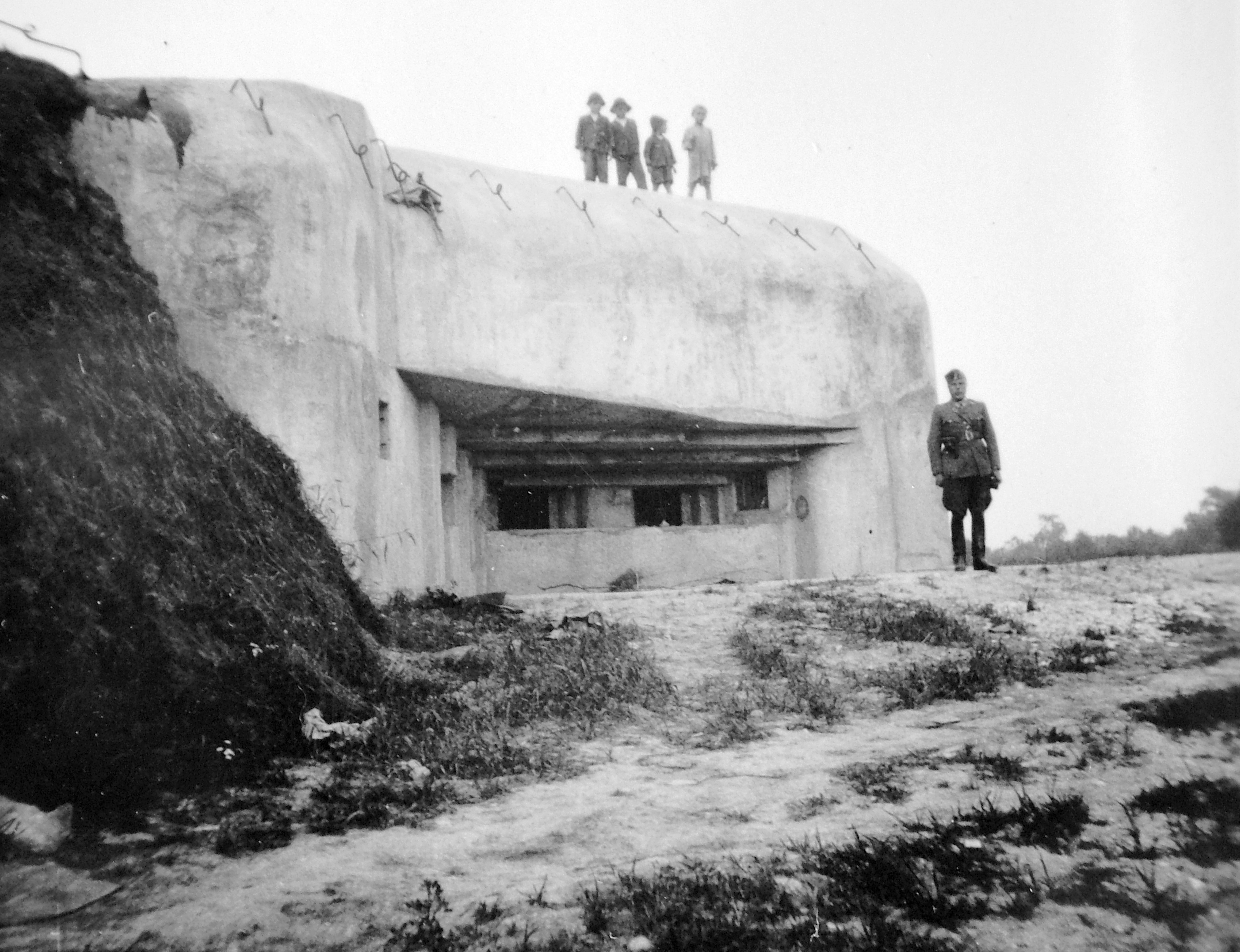
Romanian casemate occupied by Hungarian troops

The Carol II fortified line (Romanian: Linia fortificată Carol al II-lea) had been built by Romania in the late 1930s at the order of King Carol II to defend the western border with Hungary. Stretching across 300 kilometres (190 mi), it was made up of multiple separate fortified areas aiming to protect the most likely attack vectors into Transylvania proper. 320 bunkers of reinforced concrete, were created in total: 80 built in 1938, 180 built in 1939 and the rest built in the first half of 1940. The fortifications varied in size, but all were armed with machine guns, and averaged about 400 meters of distance in between them. Artillery was emplaced outside of the bunkers, which were further reinforced by rows of barbed wire and at places with flooded or dry anti-tank ditches. Bunkers were planned with overlapping field of fire to inflict maximal possible casualties upon advancing hostile infantry. The role of the fortifications was to delay the enemy, inflict casualties upon them and to give time for the bulk of the Romanian Army to be mobilized.

After the Vienna Award, the entire line fell in the area allotted to Hungary. The Romanian troops evacuated as much equipment as possible, but the dug-in telephone lines could not be recovered and so were eventually used by the Hungarian Army. The Hungarians also salvaged as much metal as possible. After all of the useful equipment and materiel had been salvaged, the bunkers were blown up by the Hungarians to prevent them from being used again.

== Nullification ==
The Second Vienna Award was voided by the Allied Commission through the Armistice Agreement with Romania (12 September 1944), whose Article 19 stipulated the following:

The Allied Governments regard the decision of the Vienna award regarding Transylvania as void and are agreed that Transylvania (the greater part thereof) should be returned to Romania, subject to confirmation at the peace settlement, and the Soviet Government agrees that Soviet forces shall take part for this purpose in joint military operations with Romania against Germany and Hungary.

That came after King Michael's Coup of 23 August 1944, when Romania changed sides and joined the Allies. Thereafter, the Romanian Army fought Nazi Germany and its allies, first in Romania and later in German-occupied Hungary and Slovakia, such as during the Budapest Offensive, the Siege of Budapest, the Bratislava–Brno Offensive, and the Prague Offensive. After the Battle of Carei on 25 October 1944, all the territory of Northern Transylvania was under the control of Romanian and Soviet troops. The Soviet Union kept administrative control until 9 March 1945, when it was reverted to Romania.

The 1947 Paris Peace Treaties reaffirmed the borders between Romania and Hungary, as they had been originally defined in the Treaty of Trianon, 27 years earlier.

== Legacy ==
During the 2020s, the Hungarian Mi Hazánk political party has expressed a desire to declare the anniversary of the Second Vienna Decision as the Day of Homecoming, an official state holiday.

== See also ==
- First Vienna Award
- Carpatho-Ukraine

== Sources ==
- Bodea, Gheorghe I.; Suciu, Vasile T.; Pușcaș, Ilie I. (1988). Administrația militară horthystă în nord-vestul României. Cluj-Napoca: Editura Dacia. OCLC 1036519807.
- Bucur, Maria (April 1, 2002). "Treznea: Trauma, nationalism and the memory of World War II in Romania". Rethinking History. 6 (1): 35–55. doi:10.1080/13642520110112100. S2CID 143005164.
- Giurescu, Dinu C. (2000). Romania in the Second World War (1939–1945). East European Monographs. Boulder, CO; New York: Columbia University Press. ISBN 9780880334433. OCLC 1170535723.
- Țurlea, Petre (1996). Ip și Trăznea: Atrocități maghiare și acțiune diplomatică (in Romanian). București: Editura Enciclopedică. ISBN 9789734501816. OCLC 243869011.
- Alessandro Vagnini. German-Italian Commissions in Transylvania 1940-1943. A crucial key Study for Italian Diplomacy, Studia Universitatis Petru Maior, Historia Volume 9, 2009, pp. 165–187.
- Shirer, William (1960). The Rise and Fall of the Third Reich: A History of Nazi Germany. New York: Simon & Schuster. ISBN 978-1-4516-4259-9. OCLC 22888118.
- Nolan, Cathal J. (2010). The Concise Encyclopedia of World War II [2 volumes]. Santa Barbara, CA: Greenwood Press. ISBN 978-0-313-33050-6. OCLC 1037383584.
- Varga E., Árpád (1999) [1998]. "Hungarians in Transylvania between 1870 and 1995" (PDF). Magyar Kisebbség. 3–4 (New series IV). Cluj/Kolozsvár: Teleki László Foundation: 331–407. ISSN 1224-2292.
