= 2012 Bucharest hair salon shooting =

Mass shooting in Bucharest

Coordinates: 44°27′13.07″N 26°5′59.37″E

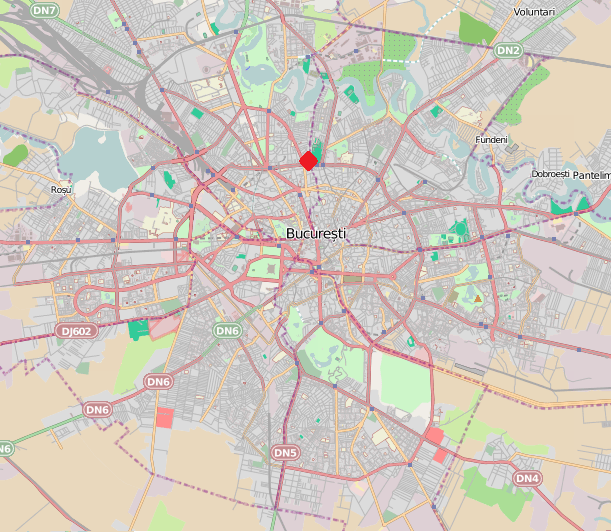
- The red marker indicates the location of the shooting
- Location: Bucharest, Romania
- Date: 5 March 2012; 17:30 (UTC+2)
- Target: Perla salon
- Attack type: Mass shooting
- Weapon: 9×19mm Glock 17 pistol
- Deaths: 2
- Injuries: 6
- Perpetrator: Gheorghe Vlădan

On 5 March 2012, a man opened fire at a hair salon in Bucharest, Romania, killing two people and wounding six more.

== Shooting ==
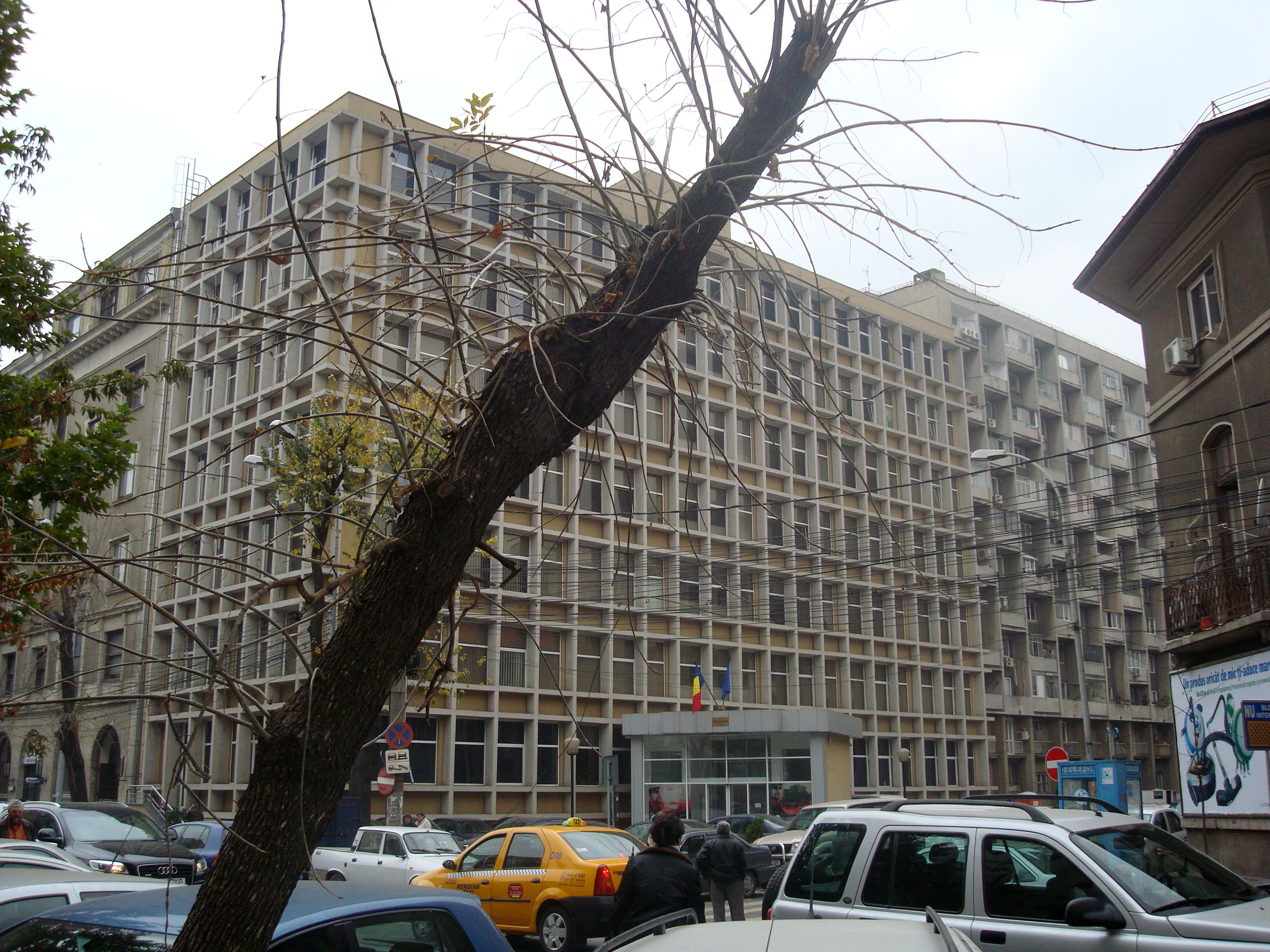
Location where the gunman took refuge after the shooting

At around 17:40 EET, Gheorghe Vlădan entered the hairdressing salon Perla (English language: Pearl), located in the Dorobanți neighborhood in Sector 1, Bucharest, at the intersection of Calea Dorobanți and Iancu de Hunedoara Boulevard. He was armed with a 9×19mm Glock semi-automatic pistol. Vlădan opened fire, shooting eight people in total. He fired eleven bullets, from which three hit his wife. The rest of the bullets were fired at the victims, and all of them hit the targets. At about 17:45, the shooter fled the scene and hid inside a public building. He turned himself in a few minutes after that.

Immediately after the shooting, a witness dialed 112 and reported the incident. A few minutes later, police, ambulances, and the press arrived at the crime scene. The perimeter of the incident was sealed, but later reopened to public traffic that night. According to local media, the gunman worked as a driver with the Medical Direction of the Interior Ministry. Eyewitnesses reported that the attacker called the police after the shooting and surrendered himself to a bodyguard at the headquarters of a nearby Electrica payment unit.

=== Victims ===
Two women were killed in the attack, they were identified as the attacker's ex-wife and a female bystander. Both fatalities were aged between the age range of 20–30. Of the six wounded, three suffered bullet wounds to the stomach area, and were transferred to the Floreasca hospital, located across the street from the scene. The other three victims suffered gunshot wounds to the extremities (arms and legs) and were moved to the Elias hospital. Both of the slain victims were shot in the head and chest, respectively. In addition, up to nine people were treated at the hospital for shock, nausea, blood pressure fluctuations, or after fainting, while witnessing the shooting, due to psychological trauma.

== Perpetrator ==
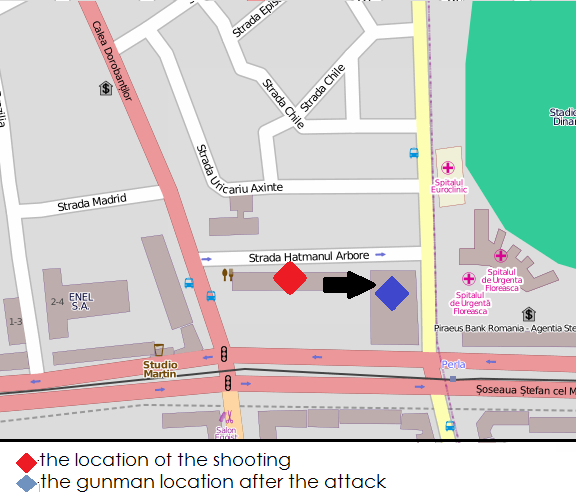
Site of the shooting

Gheorghe Vlădan, a 53-year-old chauffeur for the Romanian Ministry of Internal Affairs, was identified as the shooter. According to multiple sources, the reason behind the shooting was that the attacker's wife, Florina Vlădan, wanted to divorce him. Vlădan "was not able to take that", and in consequence decided to murder her and her coworkers, who had allegedly been "helping her to get through the divorce".

Vlădan had two cases already pending for violence. In 2005, he was accused of threatening, insulting, and hitting or other violence, the courts having to fund its payment and appeal. A news agency reported that Vlădan was said to be angry with his wife because she had filed for divorce.

After the attack, the gunman left the salon and took refuge in a nearby building owned by an electricity company. He was later detained by police officers. Later, he claimed he did not remember any of the events.

On 8 March, Vlădan stated that the weapon fired accidentally. Furthermore, he claimed he has "no recollection of the shooting whatsoever". He asked to be checked in at a mental asylum. However, it was determined that his claims are "improbable" and that "his only intention is to avoid prosecution".

On 29 March, the General Prosecutor announced that Vlădan decided to murder his wife after reading the divorce papers. The specialists from the National Institution of Forensics established that he had discernment, and that his direct intention was to murder her. In February 2013, Vlădan was found guilty of extremely grave murder and received a life sentence from the Bucharest City Court; his attorney stated that she does not believe the prosecution proved premeditation and that she will post an appeal. The appeal was judged in October 2013, and the Court of Appeal ruled to uphold the initial sentence and to raise the amount of damages due to the victims and their families.

== Public response ==
The general public in Romania was shocked. Since the attack was the first such event in recent Romanian history, a precedent has been created. The shooting sparked debates, making the public question the reliability of psychological examinations, which are required in order to receive a weapon ownership licence. It was later found that Vlădan recently had his annual exam, and the report determined he was mentally able to carry a lethal weapon. Bucharest's chief of police was replaced as a result. Three weeks later, on 25 March, the Minister for Internal Affairs stated that as a result of the shooting, fifty-two MAI employees had their gun permits revoked due to faulty psychological examinations.
