= List of massacres in Hungary =

The following is a list of massacres that have occurred in Hungary (numbers may be approximate):

Name	Date	Location	Deaths	Victims	Notes
First Mongol invasion of Hungary	March 1241–April 1242	Kingdom of Hungary			
Battle of Mohács	31 August 1526	Mohács	2,000	Hungarian prisoners	
Siege of Buda (1686)	1686	Buda	3,000	Muslims and Jews	
Red Terror (Hungary)	April - August 1919	Hungarian Soviet Republic	370-590	Anti-Communist groups, counter-revolutionaries, and dissidents	
White Terror (Hungary)	1919–1921	Hungary	1,500–4,000	Jews and communists	
Derailment of the Vienna Express	13 September 1931	Biatorbágy bridge near Budapest	22	Hungarian civilians	
Massacre of Várpalota	February 1945	Lake Grabler, Várpalota	123	Gypsies	
Kunmadaras pogrom	May 22, 1946	Kunmadaras	4	Jews	
Hungarian Revolution of 1956	1956	Hungary	3,000	Hungarian civilians	
Bloody Thursday	October 25, 1956	Kossuth Square	22-1,000	Pro-democracy protesters	
Mór massacre	May 9, 2002	Mór	8	Hungarian civilians	
2008–2009 neo-Nazi murders of Roma in Hungary	2008-2009	Hungary	6	Romani	
