= Treznea massacre =

1940 killing of Romanian civilians by Hungarian forces in Transylvania

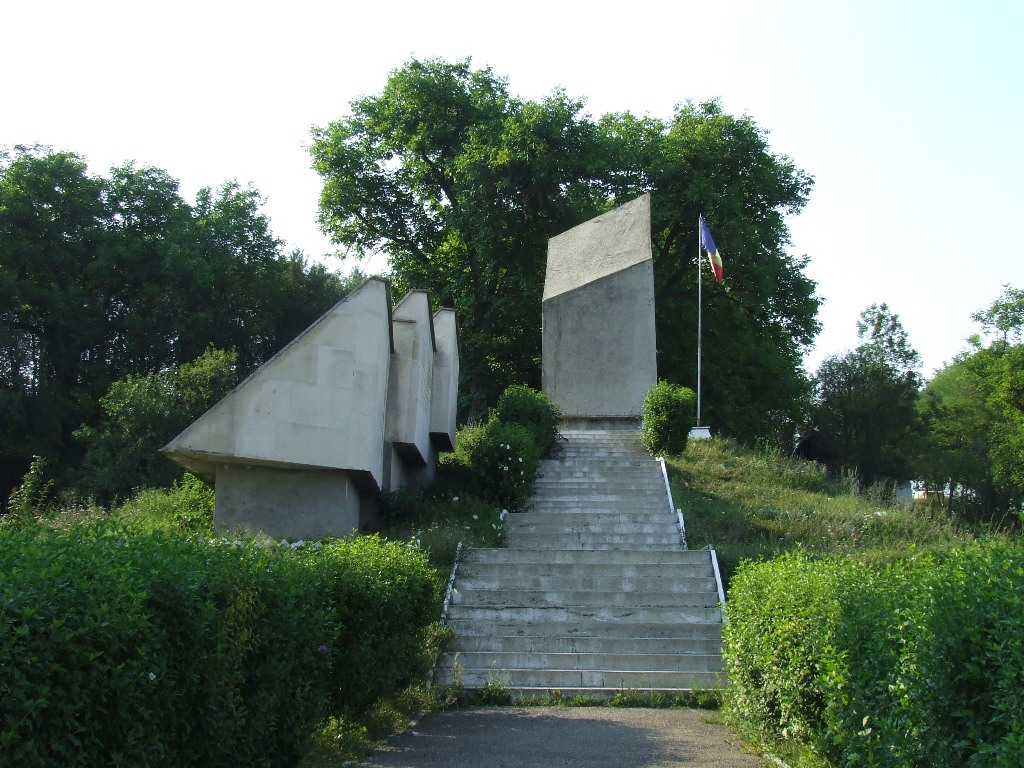
- Monument in memory of the victims of the Treznea massacre
- Location: 47°06′20″N 23°06′29″E; Treznea, Sălaj County, Romania (then Ördögkút, Hungary)
- Date: 9 September 1940
- Attack type: massacre
- Weapons: machine guns, rifles, grenades
- Deaths: 93 ethnic Romanians and Jews
- Perpetrators: Hungarian Army, locals
- Motive: Anti-Romanian sentiment, Antisemitism, Hungarian irredentism

The Treznea massacre occurred in the village of Treznea, Sălaj in north-western Transylvania on 9 September 1940, in the immediate aftermath of the Second Vienna Award, when Romania ceded Northern Transylvania to Hungary. The massacre was perpetrated by Hungarian Army troops with aid from some locals; 93 ethnic Romanians and Jews were killed.

== The events ==
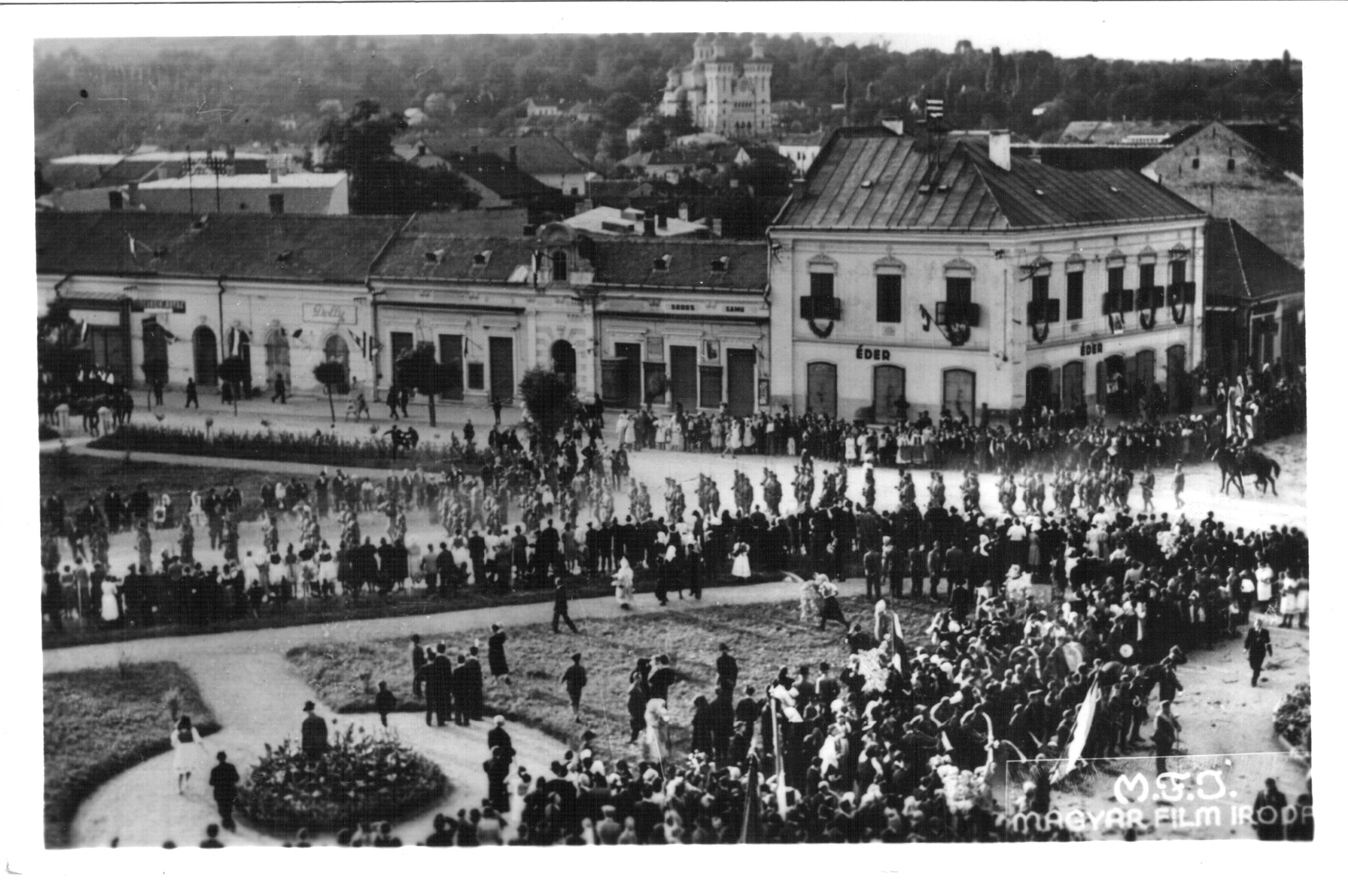
Hungarian troops marching in nearby Zalău, the day before

On that day, instigated by the former landlord Francisc (or Ferenc) Bay, the 22nd Hungarian Border Guards Battalion "Debrecen", led by Lieutenant-Colonel Ákosy, made a 4 km (2.5 mi) detour from the Zalău–Ciumărna–Hida route to the "Măgura" area of the commune, which formerly belonged to Francisc Bay. The Hungarian troops entered the village at noon, under unclear circumstances fired at the locals, killing many of them and partially destroying the Orthodox church. The sources recorded that 87 Romanians and 6 Jews were killed, including the local Orthodox priest, Traian Costea, who was burned in his church, and the Romanian local teacher with his wife, Lazăr and Aurelia Cosma (the parents of the Romanian musicologist Octavian Lazăr Cosma).

Some Hungarian historians claim that the killings came in retaliation after the Hungarian troops were fired upon by inhabitants, allegedly incited by the local Romanian Orthodox priest. These claims are both supported (for instance: colonel Károly Ákosi and the on-site committee of inquiry) and not supported by the accounts of several witnesses. The motivation of the 4 km detour of the Hungarian troops from the rest of the Hungarian Army is still a point of contention, as it could not have been as a routine occupation maneuver. Most evidence points towards the local noble Ferenc Bay who lost a large part of his estates to peasants in the 1920s, as most of the violence was directed towards the peasants living on his former estate.

By the accounts of some witnesses, not all soldiers were wearing full uniform and some of them were drunk. Also, some villagers claim to have recognised some of the young men as locals from Zalău. This might suggest that not everyone in these Hungarian troops were operating under the jurisdiction of the Hungarian Army.

According to some historians, several Hungarian inhabitants of the village tried to stop the massacre, but they were themselves chased and beaten. Other source (Doctor Ioan Pușcaș) recalled that his knowledge of Hungarian and two Hungarian women from the village saved him from certain death.

== Aftermath ==
After the war, the Cluj People's Tribunal sentenced in this case and other war crimes 481 people, out of which 100 (e.g., Ferenc Bay) to death and 163 to life imprisonment. However, most of them were tried in absentia and never served their sentences.

== See also ==
- List of massacres in Romania
- Ip massacre
- Nușfalău massacre
- Sărmașu massacre
