= Mihalț =

- Commune
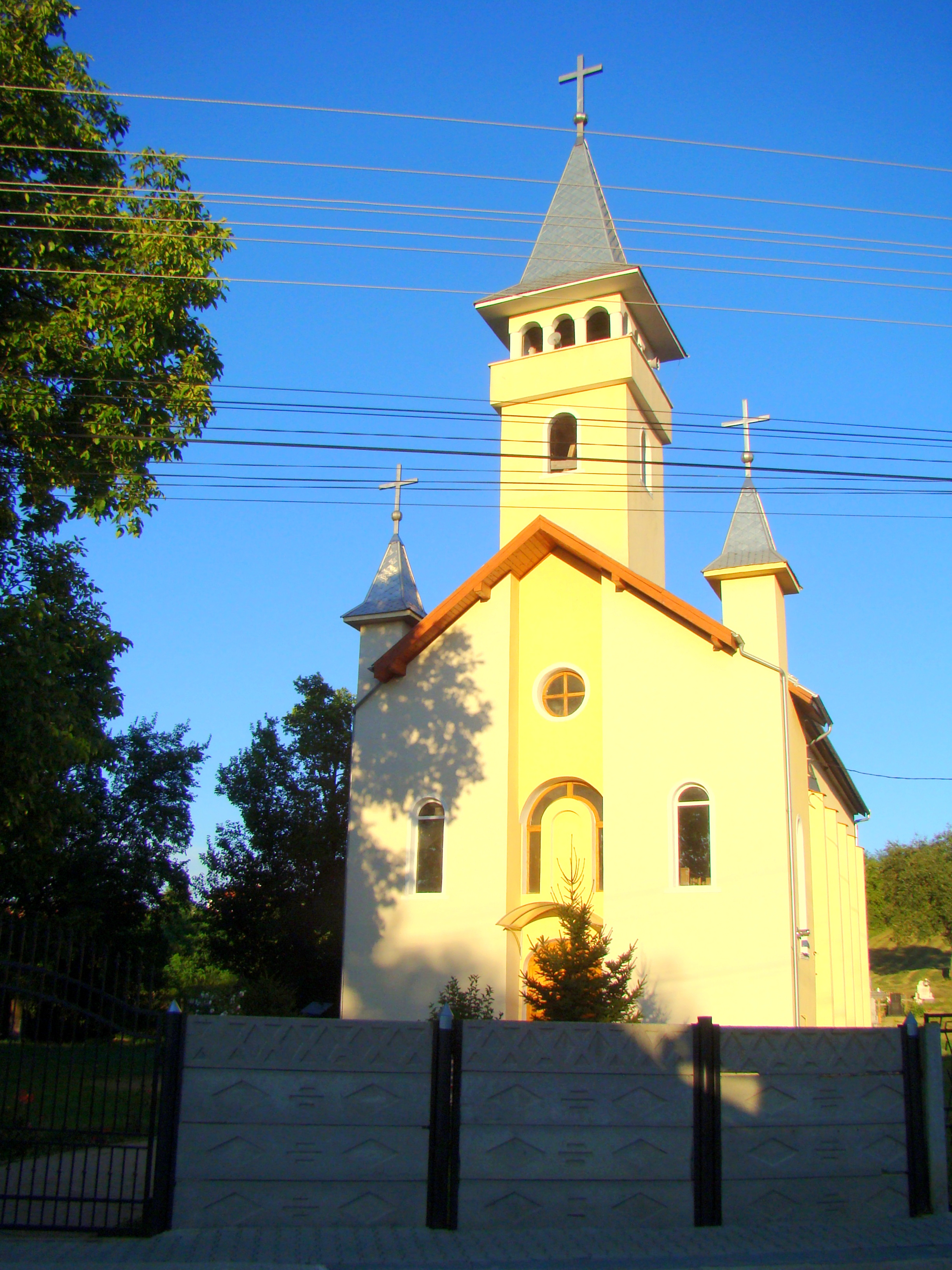
- Church in Mihalț

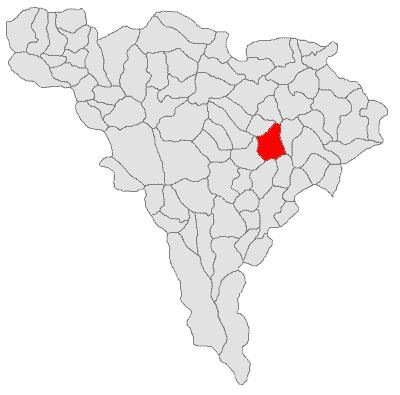
- Location in Alba County

- Location in Romania
- Coordinates: 46°09′N 23°44′E
- Country: Romania
- County: Alba

Government
  - Mayor (2020–2024): Flavius Breaz (PNL)
- Area: 65.06 km^{2} (25.12 sq mi)
- Elevation: 273 m (896 ft)
- Population (2021-12-01): 3,096
  - Density: 47.59/km^{2} (123.2/sq mi)
- Time zone: UTC+02:00 (EET)
  - Summer (DST): UTC+03:00 (EEST)
- Postal code: 517465
- Area code: (+40) 02 58
- Vehicle reg.: AB
- Website: www.primariamihalt.ro

Mihalț (German: Michelsdorf; Hungarian: Mihálcfalva) is a commune located in Alba County, Transylvania, Romania. It has a population of 3,096 as of 2021, and is composed of four villages: Cistei (Oláhcsesztve), Mihalț, Obreja (Obrázsa), and Zărieș (Zerjes).

The commune lies on the banks of the Târnava River and its tributaries, the Secaș and the Dunărița.

The Cistel train station serves the CFR Main Line 300, which connects Bucharest with the Hungarian border near Oradea.

In Mihalț, there is a folklore group called "Banul Mihalcea". It has first performed in 1906 and it is active ever since. Their most important dance is called "Jocul de Haidău".

== Natives ==
- Dorin Giurgiuca (1944–2013), table tennis player and coach
- Nicolae Mărgineanu (1905–1980), psychologist
