= Romanian People's Tribunals =

Post-WWII trials of suspected war criminals

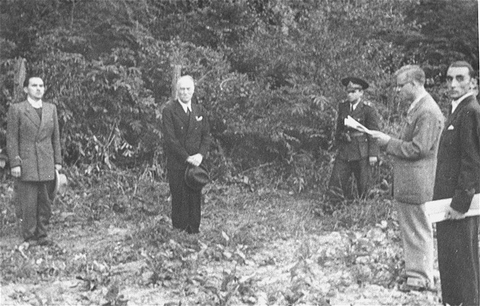
Ion Antonescu being executed by firing squad after being tried by the Bucharest tribunal.

The two Romanian People's Tribunals (Romanian: Tribunalele Poporului), the Bucharest People's Tribunal and the Northern Transylvania People's Tribunal (which sat in Cluj) were set up by the post-World War II government of Romania, overseen by the Allied Control Commission to try suspected war criminals, in line with Article 14 of the Armistice Agreement with Romania which said: "The Romanian Government and High Command undertake to collaborate with the Allied (Soviet) High Command in the apprehension and trial of persons accused of war crimes".

Some 2,700 cases were examined by a commission which found that in about half the cases there was enough evidence to bring prosecutions. 668 were found guilty of war crimes, crimes against peace and crimes against humanity.

The Bucharest Tribunal sentenced a total of 187 people. At the main trial, in May 1946, of the leaders of the former Fascist government of Ion Antonescu, twenty four defendants stood before the Tribunal. The court handed down 13 death sentences, but six were pronounced in absentia and never carried out. Of the remaining seven death sentences, 3 were commuted to life imprisonment. Ion Antonescu, Mihai Antonescu, Constantin Z. Vasiliu, and Gheorghe Alexianu were executed on June 1, 1946 at Jilava Prison. The other defendants were sentenced to life imprisonment, or long terms of imprisonment.

The Cluj Tribunal and it successors sentenced 481 people: 370 were Hungarian, 83 were German, 26 were Romanian, and 2 were Jewish. The Cluj Tribunal passed a total of 100 death sentences (none carried out), 163 sentences of life imprisonment, and a range of other sentences.

A high percentage of those condemned to death (including Hungarian writer Albert Wass) were tried in absentia and their sentences were never carried out. Others sentenced to death had their sentences commuted to life imprisonment. Those convicted of war crimes, who had demonstrated good behaviour in prison were eligible for immediate release under a decree issued in 1950. Quite a few convicted war criminals were released under the provisions of this decree. The rest were released between 1962 and 1964 when a number of amnesties were granted.

== See also ==
- Aita Seacă massacre
- Iași pogrom
- Ip massacre
- Luduș massacre
- Rehabilitation of war criminals in post-Communist Romania
- Romania during World War II
- Soviet occupation of Romania
- The Holocaust in Hungary
- The Holocaust in Romania
- Treznea massacre
- Post-World War II Romanian war crime trials
