= Chețani =

- Commune
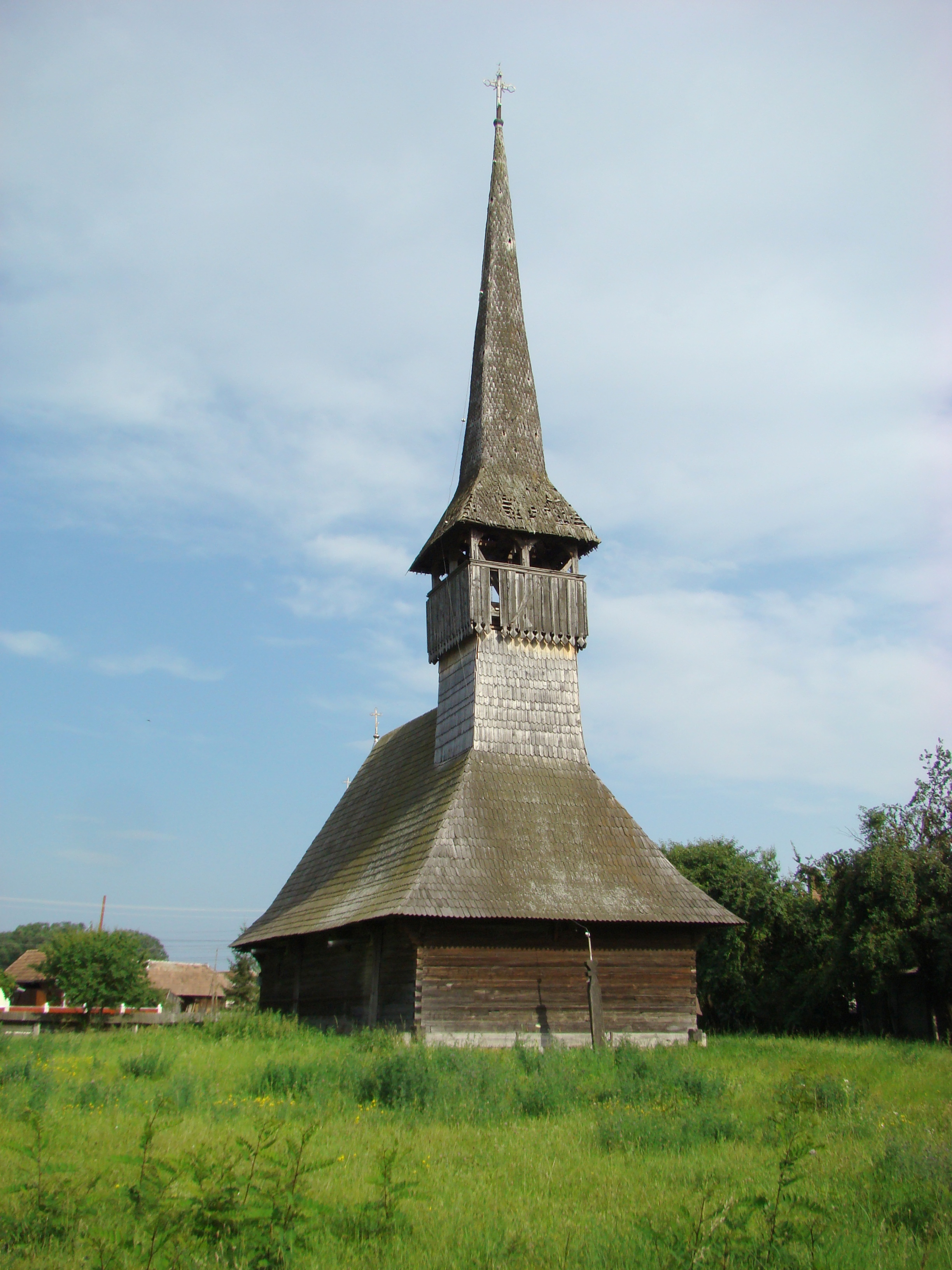
- Wooden church in Chețani

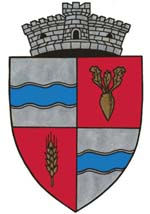
- Coat of arms

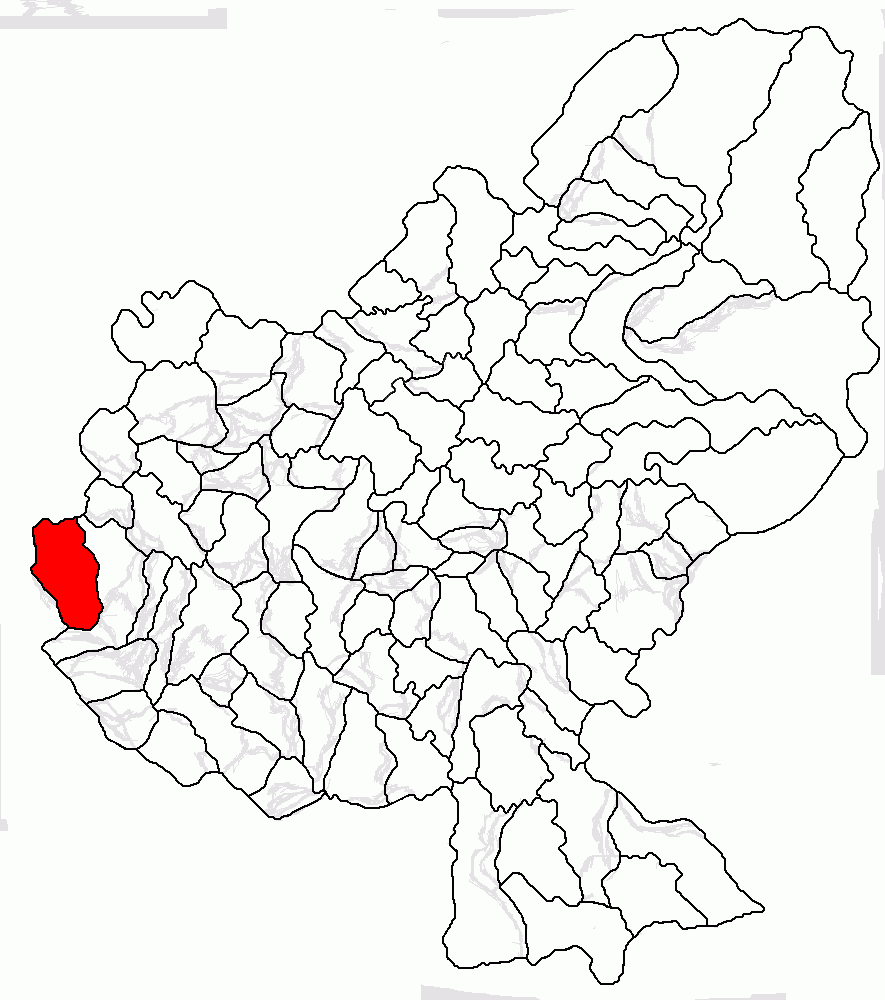
- Location in Mureș County

- Location in Romania
- Coordinates: 46°28′N 24°2′E
- Country: Romania
- County: Mureș

Government
  - Mayor (2024–2028): Emil-Florin Mocan (PSD)
- Area: 55.35 km^{2} (21.37 sq mi)
- Elevation: 279 m (915 ft)
- Population (2021-12-01): 2,468
  - Density: 44.59/km^{2} (115.5/sq mi)
- Time zone: UTC+02:00 (EET)
  - Summer (DST): UTC+03:00 (EEST)
- Postal code: 547150
- Area code: (+40) 0265
- Vehicle reg.: MS
- Website: primariachetani.ro

Chețani (Hungarian: Maroskece, Hungarian pronunciation: [mɒroʃkɛtsɛ]) is a commune in Mureș County, Transylvania, Romania. Its population was 2,857 in 2002. It is composed of seven villages: Chețani, Coasta Grindului (Berekszéle), Cordoș (Kardos), Giurgiș (Györgyed), Grindeni (Gerendkeresztúr), Hădăreni (Hadrév), and Linț (Lincitanyák).

== Demographics ==
At the 2021 census, the commune had a population of 2,468; of those, 86.1% were Romanians, 5.51% Hungarians, and 3.97% Roma.

== Natives ==
- Andrei Nicolae Moldovan, Romanian Orthodox bishop
- Aurel Pantea (born 1952), poet and literary critic

== See also ==
- List of Hungarian exonyms (Mureș County)
- 1993 Hădăreni riots
