= Kemény =

Kemény or Kemeny is a Hungarian surname, and may refer to:

- Dénes Kemény (b. 1954), former Hungarian water polo player
- Emil Kemény (1860–1925), Hungarian-American chess master
- Ferenc Kemény (1917–2008), also known as Francis Kemeni or Franz Kemeny, Hungarian translator
- Gábor Kemény (politician, 1910–1946), Hungarian politician who served as Minister of Foreign Affairs, 1944–1945
- János Kemény (disambiguation) – several people with the name János Kemény or its anglicization, John Kemeny
- Kari Kemény (1950–2021), Norwegian translator
- Lajos Kemény (b. 1959), Hungarian physician, dermatologist, professor of Medicine
- Rudolf Kemény (1871–1945), Hungarian violinist and violin teacher
- Zoltán Kemény (1907–1965), Hungarian sculptor
- Zsigmond Kemény (1814–1875), Hungarian author
- The Kemeny method, named after John G. Kemeny (1926-1992)

Kemény (Kemen, Kemyn, Kemynus) was also a former given name in medieval Hungary. Notable people with the given name include:

- Kemény, son of Lawrence, 13th-century Hungarian lord

== See also ==
- List of titled noble families in the Kingdom of Hungary
