= Czakó =

Czakó or Cakó is a Hungarian language surname. It may refer to:

- Csaba Czakó (1943–2023), Hungarian rower
- Ferenc Cakó (born 1950), Hungarian artist
- György Czakó (1933–2023), Hungarian figure skater
- Hito Çako (1923–1975), Albanian politician
- Iosif Czako (1906–1966), Romanian football player
- Jacqueline Cako (born 1991), American tennis player
- Kálmán Czakó (1919–1985) Hungarian prosecutor and politician
- Krisztina Czakó (born 1978), Hungarian figure skater
- László Czakó (born 1966), Hungarian gastroenterologist
- Pirro Çako (born 1965), Albanian singer
- Zsigmond Czakó (1820–1847), Hungarian actor and writer

== See also ==
- Shako
