= Blatt =

Blatt is a surname. Notable people with the surname include:

- David Blatt (born 1959), Israeli-American basketball player and coach
- Genevieve Blatt (1913–1996), American judge and politician from Pennsylvania
- John M. Blatt (1921–1990), Austrian-born American-Australian-Israeli theoretical physicist
- Josephine Blatt (1869–1923), American strongwoman
- Leah Blatt Glasser (born 1950), American literary critic and scholar
- Lisa Blatt (born 1964/1965), American lawyer
- Melanie Blatt (born 1975), British singer and actress
- Nicolae Blatt (1890–1965), Romanian ophthalmologist, surgeon, and medical researcher
- Rainer Blatt (born 1952), German-Austrian physicist
- Robert Blatt (1921–1994), American alpine skier
- Solomon Blatt Sr. (1895–1986), American politician from South Carolina
- Solomon Blatt Jr. (1921–2016), American federal district judge from South Carolina
- Sidney Blatt (1928–2014), American psychiatry and psychology professor
- Tamir Blatt (born 1997), Israeli basketball player in the Israel Basketball Premier League
- Thomas Blatt (1927–2015), Polish-American writer and speaker, survived Sobibor extermination camp
- Warren Blatt (born 1962), American genealogist and computer engineer

== See also ==
- Blat (disambiguation)
