= Rosztóczy =

Rosztóczy is a surname of Hungarian origins. Notable people with the surname include:

- Ernő Rosztóczy (1899–1969), Hungarian physician
- István Rosztóczy (1942–1993), Hungarian medical researcher, microbiologist, the former's son
