= Raoul Șorban =

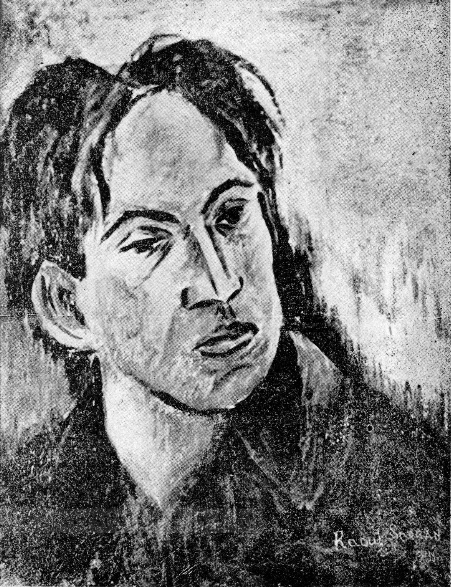

Raoul Șorban (September 4, 1912 – July 19, 2006) was a Romanian painter, journalist, writer, essayist, art historian, academic, and memoirist.

== Biography ==
His father, the composer Guilelm Șorban, descended from an old ethnic Romanian noble family in Transylvania; his grandmother was of Alsatian origin.

Born in Dej (then Dés, Kingdom of Hungary), Șorban studied painting and music in Italy (at the Giuseppe Verdi Conservatory in Milan), Austria and Germany between 1930 and 1934. He then studied Law at the University of Cluj. Meanwhile, he exhibited his works of painting in art shows at Baia Mare and Cluj (1935), Bucharest and Baia Mare (1938), and again in Cluj (1939, 1942, 1943). In 1938, Șorban became a teaching assistant of art history at Cluj University.

Following the Second Vienna Award which assigned Northern Transylvania to Hungary, he decided to remain in Cluj (Kolozsvár), and founded the Northern Transylvanian Romanian Publishing House (Editura Românească din Ardealul de Nord), the only Romanian-language publishing house in the region. At the same time, he contributed articles for the Romanian-language newspaper Tribuna Ardealului ("The Transylvanian Tribune"). He was arrested by the Hungarian authorities and held in custody between March and October 1942.

In 1944, Șorban played an active part in the rescue of Jews who faced death during The Holocaust, helping the remaining members of the community to escape to British Palestine. In May 1944, he returned to Bucharest, where he joined the Public Relations Department in the Romanian government (see Romania during World War II).

After Romania's exit from the Axis and the onset of Soviet occupation, as Northern Transylvania was returned to Romania, Șorban again moved to Cluj. Between 1946 and 1948, he headed the Cluj Conservatory and, starting with 1948, the Art Institute of Cluj (until 1949). The Communist regime purged him from office, which forced him to earn his living as a house painter in a cooperative. He was arrested in 1952 by the Securitate and detained without trial until 1955 (overall, Șorban spent 50 months in prison without trial during his life).

In 1956, he was again allowed access to academia. A publisher at Editura de stat pentru literatură și artă, he was re-admitted as professor, teaching at the University of Bucharest (1965) and the Nicolae Grigorescu Art Institute of Bucharest (1968).

The Yad Vashem Holocaust Museum awarded him in 1987 the Righteous Among the Nations title for his efforts to save the Transylvanian Jews from extermination. He received the Honorary Citizenship of Israel in 1990. This role of his is disputed by some. A web site is dedicated to his memory.

== Literary works ==
- Aurel Popp (biography), Raoul Ṣorban and Zoltan Banner, col. "Maeṣtrii Artei Româneṣti", Editura Meridiane, Bucureṣti, 1968
- Fantasma imperiului ungar și casa Europei (Editura Globus, București, 1990, ISBN 973-49-0000-5 )
- Chestiunea maghiară (Editura Valahia, București, 2001, ISBN 973-95092-4-X)
- Invazie de stafii. Însemnări și mărturisiri despre o altă parte a vieții (Editura Meridiane, București, 2003, ISBN 973-33-0477-8)
- Rețelele Omeniei (with Adrian Riza) (Editura R.A.I., 1995, ISBN 973-570-018-2)
- Vida (album) (Editura Meridiane, 1981)
- Theodor Pallady (Mică bibliotecă de arta), Editura Meridiane, 1975
- Constantin Mustață, Raoul Șorban - Dialoguri cu Raoul Șorban, Edditura Anotimp, Oradea, 2002, ISBN 973-98564-1-1
- Aurel Ciupe, Editura Meridiane, București, 1967,
- Constantin Baraschi, Editura Meridiane, București 1966
- O viață de artist între München și Maramureș (Hollósy Simon), Editura Meridiane, București 1986
- Ter Borch, Editura Meridiane, București 1985
- Theodor Pallady (album)
