= Lajos Kemény =

Hungarian physician and dermatologist (born 1959)

- Born: April 14, 1959 (age 67); Szeged, Hungary
- Citizenship: Hungarian
- Education: Albert Szent-Györgyi Medical University
- Known for: The role of natural immunity in the skin The pathogenesisof inflammatory skin diseases Genomic investigations in the pathogenesis of multifactorial skin diseases immune system of the human skin psoriasis atopic dermatitis phototherapy
- Spouse(s): Dr. Keményné (Mrs. Kemény) Dr. Márta Vincze, teacher
- Children: Dr. Lajos Kemény (1988– ) Márta Kemény (1992– )
- Awards: Hermal Award (1996); Paul-Martini Award (1998); Award of the Hungarian Academy of Sciences (2010); Batthyány-Strattmann Award (2010); Otto Braun-Falco Medal (2010)
- Scientific career
- Fields: Clinical medicine Dermatology; Venereology; Allergology; Cosmetology
- Workplaces: Department of Dermatology and Allergology, Albert Szent-Györgyi Health Center, Faculty of Medicine University of Szeged (SZTE), Szeged

Lajos Kemény (Hungarian: [ˈlɒjoʃ ˈkɛmeːɲ]; born 14 April 1959) is a Hungarian dermatologist, venereologist, allergologist, medical researcher, full professor and the Head of the Department of Dermatology and Allergology, the director of the Albert Szent-Györgyi Health Center, Faculty of Medicine, University of Szeged and the Vice-Rector for Science, Research Development and Innovation. He is a notable and respected scientist both in Hungary and around the world.

== Life ==
Lajos Kemény was born on 14 April 1959 in Szeged. He graduated from the Albert Szent-Györgyi Medical University, Szeged in 1983. He has been working at the Department of Dermatology and Allergology, University of Szeged (until 2000 Albert Szent-Györgyi Medical University) since his graduation.

He started as a clinical physician first, and later he became an associate professor (docent, reader).

He took candidate of medicine degree in 1990.

Meanwhile, he was awarded a Humboldt Fellowship to Department of Dermatology, LMU Munich in Germany between 1990 and 1991.

In 1996 he habilitated.

He completed his Doctor of Science (D.Sc.) degree in Medicine in 1998.

He has been visiting professor at the Heinrich Heine University Düsseldorf, in 2001.

In 2002 he received the title of university (full) professor.

In 2004 he became the head of the Department of Dermatology and Allergology, Albert Szent-Györgyi Health Center, Faculty of Medicine University of Szeged, Szeged. From 2007 he acted as head of the Graduate School of Clinical Medicine at the Faculty of Medicine, University of Szeged. From 2014 he is the Vice-Rector for Science, Research Development and Innovation, SZTE.

He owns 23 patents in phototherapy, biotechnology and molecular biology. His working papers were issued in both national and international prestigious professional research scientific journals, and 1070 scientific articles and books were published.

He presents talks at several conferences and at the different science forums and he developed significant research and professional relationships. His scientific and professional activities involve writing a lot of books, taking active part in editing numerous issues and he enriched the medical literature with several books.

He detected HHV8 virus in classical Kaposi's sarcoma and Merkel cell polyomavirus in Merkel-cell carcinoma.

== Committee Memberships ==
- European Immunodermatological Society, member of Governing Body (2000-)
- European Society for Dermatological Research (ESDR), member of Governing Body (1996-1999)
- ESDR Eastern European Committee, president (1996-1999)
- Scientific Committee of the German-Hungarian Dermatological Society, Hungarian president (1998-2002)
- Hungarian Dermatological Society, president (2008-2010)
- Hungarian Allergological and Immunological Society, member of Governing Body (2003-)
- Hungarian Immunological Society, president (2010-)
- European Dermatology Forum: Executive Committee, member (2004-)
- Deutsche Dermatologische Gesellschaft (German Dermatologic Society), corresponding member (2004-)
- Hungarian Scholarship Board member (2008-2011)
- Hungarian Hyperbaric and Diving Medicinal Society (MHBOT) (2010-)
- Hungarian Society of Personalized Medicine (HSPM) member of the board of supervision (2010-)
- Member of the Scientific Board of the Fondation René Touraine (2011-)
- European Academy of Dermatology and Venerology, member of Governing Body (2012-)

=== Editorial Board Memberships ===
- Bőrgyógyászati és Venereológiai Szemle
- Dermato-Endocrinology
- Hautarzt
- Journal of Dermatological Treatment
- Česka Dermatovenerologie
- Case Reports in Dermatology
- Skin Pharmacology and Physiology

=== Carrier-related Public Activities ===
- Member of the Faculty of Medicine, University of Szeged (1997-)
- President of Control Commission for Contractual Researches of Medical University of Szeged (1997-)
- Member of the Educational and Credit Committee (2000-)
- Member of Accreditation Committee of University of Szeged (2001-)
- Graduate School of Clinical Medicine, head of the Immunology Programme, (2004-2007)
- Gremium Leader of Specialized Plastic (Burning) Surgery of Faculty of Medicine, Szent-Györgyi Albert Medical and Pharmaceutical Centre, University of Szeged (2005-)
- Habilitation Committee, University of Szeged, member (2006-), representative of the Clinical Medicine Speciality (2012-)
- Vice President of the Faculty of Medicine, Szent-Györgyi Albert Medical and Pharmaceutical Centre, University of Szeged (2006-2007)
- Deputy Dean of the Albert Szent-Györgyi Medical and Pharmaceutical Centre of the University of Szeged (2006-)
- Vice Dean for General Affairs of the Faculty Council of the Medical Faculty of the University of Szeged (2006–2014)
- President of the Strategic Committee of the Albert Szent-Györgyi Medical Center of the University of Szeged (2007-)
- Head of the Graduate School of Clinical Medicine (2007-)
- President of Control Commission for Contractual Researches of the University of Szeged (2007-)
- Leader of the Postdoctoral Program at the University of Szeged (2007–)
- Member of the University of Szeged, Clinical Medicine Committee (2009-)
- Professional Board of Dermatological and Venerological Diseases, president (2009-2011), head of division (2011-)
- Dermatologist supervisor of the Southern Great Plain region of Hungary (2005-2009)
- Hungarian Scientific Research Fund (OTKA), Life Sciences Board, Review Board Member (2007-2011)
- Member of No. II Doctor's Committee of Hungarian Academy of Sciences (2002-2008), Secretary (2011-)
- Member of the Hungarian Academy of Sciences, Clinical I. Scientific Committee (2008-2011)
- Office for Subsidised Research Units, Council of Research Units, deputy member (2008-2011)
- Board member of the „Committee supervising the research and therapeutic use of embrionyc and tissue stem cells” Medical Sciences Section of the Hungarian Academy of Sciences (2009-)
- Bolyai János Research Fellowship of the Hungarian Academy of Sciences, member of the Advisory Board (2010-), member of the council (2013-)
- University of Szeged, Doctoral Council member (Clinical medical sciences) (2010-)
- University of Szeged, University of Szeged, Science Policy Advisory Board member (Clinical medical sciences) (2011-)
- Member of the Hungarian Academy of Sciences, Research Infrastructure Presidential Committee (KIEB) (2012-)
- Hungarian Academy of Sciences (HAS), V. Division of Medical Sciences, member of the Clinical Sciences Committee (2013-)
- Member of the Doctoral Committee of the Faculty of Medicine of the University of Debrecen (2013-)
- Member of the Life Science Work Group of the National Research Infrastructure Survey and Roadmap (2014-)
- Member of the Scientific and Research Ethics Committee of the Medical Research Council, Hungary (2014-)

== Awards and honors ==
- Scientific Award of Fekete Zoltán Foundation (1985, 1987)
- First place at the Forum of Young Dermatologists (1987)
- Award of the Szeged Regional Committee of the Hungarian Academy of Sciences (1989)
- Award of the European Society for Dermatological Research (1992)
- 3rd place at the „Emanuele Stablum” International Competition for Dermatologists (1992)
- István Cserháti Memorial Medal and Award (1992)
- Academical Youth-Award (1993)
- Hermal Award (1996)
- Paul-Martini Award (1998)
- Young Researcher of Outstanding Scientific Achievement in the Region (Academical Award) (1998)
- Poster Award: 22. Jahrestagung der VOD (1999)
- Award of the Journal „Bőrgyógyászati és Venerológiai Szemle” (1999)
- Best Lecturer of the School-Year 1999/2000 (2000)
- NOVICARDIN Award (2004)
- XVI. Innovation Grand Prize (2008)
- Award of the Hungarian Academy of Sciences (2010)
- Batthyány-Strattmann Award (2010)
- Otto Braun-Falco Medal (2010)
- Széchenyi Professor Scholarship (Ministry of Education of Hungary) (1997-2001)
- Széchenyi István Scholarship (2001-2002)
- Kaposi Award (2011)
- Dermopharmazie-Innovationspreis DIP (2014)
- Leo von Zumbusch Award (2017)

== Selected works ==
=== Papers ===
- Szell M, Danis J, Bata-Csorgo Z, Kemeny, L: PRINS, a primate-specific long non-coding RNA, plays a role in the keratinocyte stress response and psoriasis pathogenesis, PFLUGERS ARCHIV-EUROPEAN JOURNAL OF PHYSIOLOGY 468: (6) pp. 935–943, 2016.
- Tax G, Urban E, Palotas Z, Puskas R, Konya Z, Biro T, Kemeny, L, Szabo K: Propionic Acid Produced by Propionibacterium acnes Strains Contri-butes to Their Pathogenicity, Acta Dermato-Venereologica 96: (1) pp. 43–49, 2016.
- Varga E, Korom I, Polyanka H, Szabo K, Szell M, Baltas E, Bata-Csorgo Z, Kemeny, L, Olah J: BRAFV600E mutation in cutaneous lesions of patients with adult Langerhans cell histiocytosis, JOURNAL OF THE EUROPEAN ACADEMY OF DERMATOLOGY AND VENEREOLOGY 29: (6) pp. 1205–1211, 2015.
- Szabo K, Bata-Csorgo Z, Dallos A, Bebes A, Francziszti L, Dobozy A, Kemeny, L, Szell M: Regulatory Networks Contributing to Psoriasis Susceptibility, Acta Dermato-Venereologica 94: (4) pp. 380–385, 2014.
- Manczinger M, Kemeny, L: Novel factors in the pathogenesis of psoriasis and potential drug candidates are found with systems biology approach, PLOS ONE 8: (11) p. e80751, 2013.
- Szabó K, Tax G, Teodorescu-Brinzeu D, Koreck A, Kemény, L: TNFα gene polymorphisms in the pathogenesis of acne vulgaris, ARCHIVES OF DERMATOLOGICAL RESEARCH 303: (1) pp. 19–27, 2011.
- Nagy I, Pivarcsi A, Kis K, Koreck A, Bodai L, McDowell A, Seltmann H, Patrick S, Zouboulis CC, Kemeny, L: Propionibacterium acnes and lipopolysaccharide induce the expression of antimicrobial peptides and proinflammatory cytokines/chemokines in human sebocytes, MICROBES AND INFECTION 8: (8) pp. 2195–2205, 2006.
- Pivarcsi A, Nagy I, Koreck A, Kenderessy-Szabó A, Széll M, Dobozy A, Kemény, L: Microbial compounds induce the expression of pro-inflammatory cytokines, chemokines and human beta-defensin-2 in vaginal epithelial cells, MICROBES AND INFECTION 7: (9-10) pp. 1117–1127, 2005.
- Nagy I, Pivarcsi A, Koreck A, Széll M, Urbán E, Kemény, L: Distinct strains of Propionibacterium acnes induces selective human ?-defensin-2 and interleukin-8 expression in human keratinocytes through Toll-like receptors, JOURNAL OF INVESTIGATIVE DERMATOLOGY 124: (5) pp. 931–938, 2005.
- Pivarcsi A, Bodai L, Rethi B, Kenderessy Szabo A, Koreck A, Szell M, Beer Z, Bata Csorgo Z, Magocsi M, Rajnavolgyi E, Dobozy A, Kemeny, L: Expression and function of Toll-like receptors 2 and 4 in human keratinocytes, INTERNATIONAL IMMUNOLOGY 15: (6) pp. 721–730, 2003.

=== Book ===
- Kárpáti, Sarolta–Kemény, Lajos–Remenyik, Éva: Bőrgyógyászat és venerológia (Dermatology and Venereology), Medicina Könyvkiadó, Budapest, 2013. ISBN 978 963 226 392 2
