= László Czakó =

Hungarian gastroenterologist and academic

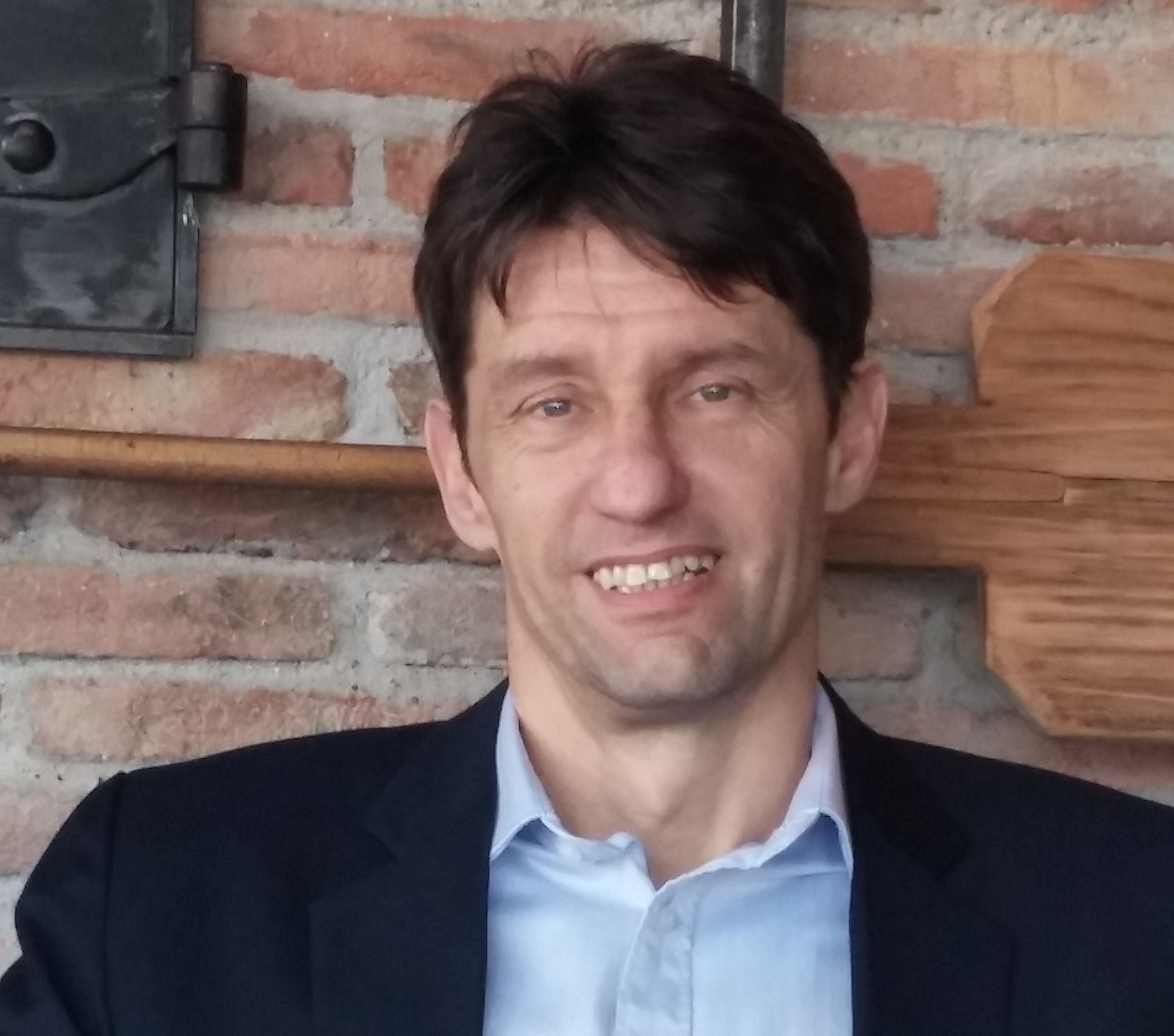
- Born: January 5, 1966 (age 60); Szeged, Hungary
- Citizenship: Hungarian
- Education: Albert Szent-Györgyi Medical University (SZOTE)
- Known for: Pancreatobiliary diseases (differential diagnosis, staging, treatment) including pancreatitis, pancreatic cancer, cholangiocarcinoma Advanced interventional endoscopic techniques including endoscopic ultrasonography, endoscopic retrograde cholangiopancreatography, polypectomy, endoscopic mucosal resection, the early diagnosis of (pre)malignant disease Prevention, screening, surveillance strategies in gastrointestinal cancer Pancreatic diabetes mellitus
- Children: Bálint (2002– ) Ákos (2005– ) Máté (2009– ) Dávid (2011– )
- Awards: “Research Award” (European Association for Gastroenterology and Endoscopy) (1994); Award of the World Gastroenterology Organization (1998; 2002) „Pro optimo merito in pancreatico-oncologia” award (2016)
- Scientific career
- Fields: Clinical medicine Internal medicine Gastroenterology; Diabetes mellitus
- Workplaces: First Department of Medicine, Albert Szent-Györgyi Health Center, Faculty of Medicine University of Szeged (SZTE), Szeged

László Czakó (Hungarian: [ˈlaːsloː ˈt͡sɒkoː]; born 5 January 1966) is a Hungarian gastroenterologist, medical researcher, university professor and the deputy director of the First Department of Medicine, Albert Szent-Györgyi Health Center, Faculty of Medicine, University of Szeged.

== Life ==
László Czakó was born on 5 January 1966 in Szeged. He graduated from the Albert Szent-Györgyi Medical University, Szeged in 1990. He has been working at the First Department of Medicine, University of Szeged (until 2000 Albert Szent-Györgyi Medical University) since his graduation. He started as a research fellow and later he became a senior lecturer. Meanwhile, he was awarded a scholarship to the Department of Gastroenterology, Academic Medical Center, University of Amsterdam, The Netherlands and a postdoctoral fellowship from the Matsumae Foundation to the Third Department of Internal Medicine, University of Occupational and Environmental Health Japan, School of Medicine in 1994 then a postdoctoral fellowship from the Japanese Council for Medical Training, Department of Gastroenterology and Endoscopy, Toranomon Hospital, Tokyo, Japan in 1999. And this year he completed his PhD degree in pancreatology and then he took a Master's degree at the Faculty of Law, Attila József University, Szeged in Health economics. In 2003 he became an assistant professor. In 2005 he habilitated and was appointed to an associate professor (docent, reader) in 2009. He completed his Doctor of Science (D.Sc.) degree in Medicine, and he received the title of university (full) professor in 2014.
