= István Rosztóczy =

- Born: 17 November 1942; Budapest, Hungary
- Died: 27 October 1993 (aged 50); Mount Fuji, Gotemba, Japan
- Education: Medical University of Szeged
- Known for: Interferon
- Spouse: Zsuzsanna Czapf
- Awards: The Hungarian Red Cross Outstanding Work Award (1989); Laudation of the Minister of Social Affairs and Health (1989)
- Scientific career
- Fields: Microbiology; Interferon
- Workplaces: Department of Microbiology, Albert Szent-Györgyi Medical University, Szeged

István Rosztóczy (17 November 1942 in Budapest, Hungary – 27 October 1993 in Mount Fuji, Gotemba, Japan) was a Hungarian microbiologist, medical researcher, blood donor organizer, who devoted his life to research and science.

== Life ==
He graduated from the Gábor Bethlen Secondary Grammar School at Hódmezővásárhely in 1960. He took a degree at the Medical University of Szeged in 1966. He started to work at the Department of Microbiology while studying at the university and continued his research with interferon after his graduation in Szeged. His supervisor was Imre Mécs. Meanwhile, he was awarded a scholarship to the Department of Microbiology in Birmingham, England and to the Johns Hopkins University Oncology Center with Professor Paula M. Pitha-Rowe in Baltimore, the United States. He is known for interferon, especially the mechanism of the priming effect of interferon, then interleukin-6 and tumor necrosis factor. He was a devoted hiker and made his last trip in Mount Fuji, Japan when he was wounded mortally while climbing down the mountain in the time of the International Society for Interferon and Cytokine Research (ISICR) Meeting in Tokyo. He was buried in his native land.

== Family ==
His father, Ernő Rosztóczy, senior (1899–1969) was a physician. His mother was pharmacist Ilona Nagy (b. 3 November 1903 in Szeged, and d. 28 December 1984). He had two siblings. His brother, Ernő Rosztóczy, junior taught at the Gábor Bethlen Secondary Grammar School at Hódmezővásárhely and his sister, Stefánia Rosztóczy (1934−1943) died as a child. On 17 September 1966 in Szeged he married Zsuzsanna Czapf, who gave birth to two sons. His elder son, András Rosztóczy (born 1967) is a gastroenterologist and medical researcher. His younger son, Péter Rosztóczy (born 1978) was graduated in Mathematics and Computer Science at Eötvös Loránd University (ELTE), Budapest.

== Awards ==
- The Hungarian Red Cross Outstanding Work Award (1989)
- Laudation of the Minister of Social Affairs and Health (1989)

== Selected works ==
=== Book ===
- Rosztóczy, István: Orvosi mikrobiológia gyakorlati és kiegészítő jegyzet (Lecture Notes in Medical Microbiology), Szegedi Orvostudományi Egyetem (Medical University of Szeged), Általános Orvostudományi Kar (Faculty of Medicine), Szeged, 1982.

=== Papers ===
- Rosztóczy, István, M. Papós, Klára Megyeri: Different interferon-inducing capacities of L929 cell sublines and the enhancement of interferon production by priming are controlled pretranslationally. FEBS Letters 208, 56−58 (1986). [IF: 3.581]
- Rosztóczy István, J. Content, Klára Megyeri: Interferon pretreatment regulates interferon and interleukin-6 production in L929 cells in a coordinated manner. J. Interferon Res. 12, 13−16 (1992). [IF: 1.275]
- Megyeri, Klára, W.-C. Au, István Rosztóczy, N.B.K. Raj, Miller, R.L., Tomai, M.A., Pitha, P.M.: Stimulation of interferon and cytokine gene expression by imiquimod and stimulation by Sendai virus utilize similar signal transduction pathways. Mol. Cell. Biol. 15, 2207−2218 (1995). [IF: 10.498]
- Megyeri, Klára, Mándi, Yvette, Degré, M., Rosztóczy István: Induction of cytokine production by different Staphylococcal strains. Cytokine 19, 206−212 (2002). [IF: 2.49]

== Bibliography ==
- Béládi, Ilona: Obituary. István Rosztóczy. Journal of Interferon Research 14, 145–145 (1994). URL: See External links
- Mándi, Yvette (ed.): Orvosi mikrobiológia és immunológia gyakorlati jegyzet (Lecture Notes in Medical Microbiology and Immunology), Medicina Kiadó, 2010. (based on the lecture notes of István Rosztóczy.)
