= Blat =

Blat or BLAT may refer to:

- BLAT, a sandwich with bacon, lettuce, avocado, and tomato
- BLAT (bioinformatics), an algorithm
- Blat (favors), a form of corruption in Russia and the Soviet Union
- Blat (Romania), a term denoting a fixed match in Romanian football
- Blat (software) is a Windows command line utility that sends email using SMTP or posts to Usenet using NNTP
- Blat, Byblos District, a village in Mount Lebanon Governorate, Lebanon
- Blat, Marjayoun a village in Marjeyoun District, Lebanon
- Caio Blat (born 1980), Brazilian actor

== See also ==
- Blatt
- Der Blatt, a weekly Yiddish newspaper published in New York
- Ballat, a village in Homs Governorate, Syria
