= Dej =

- Municipality
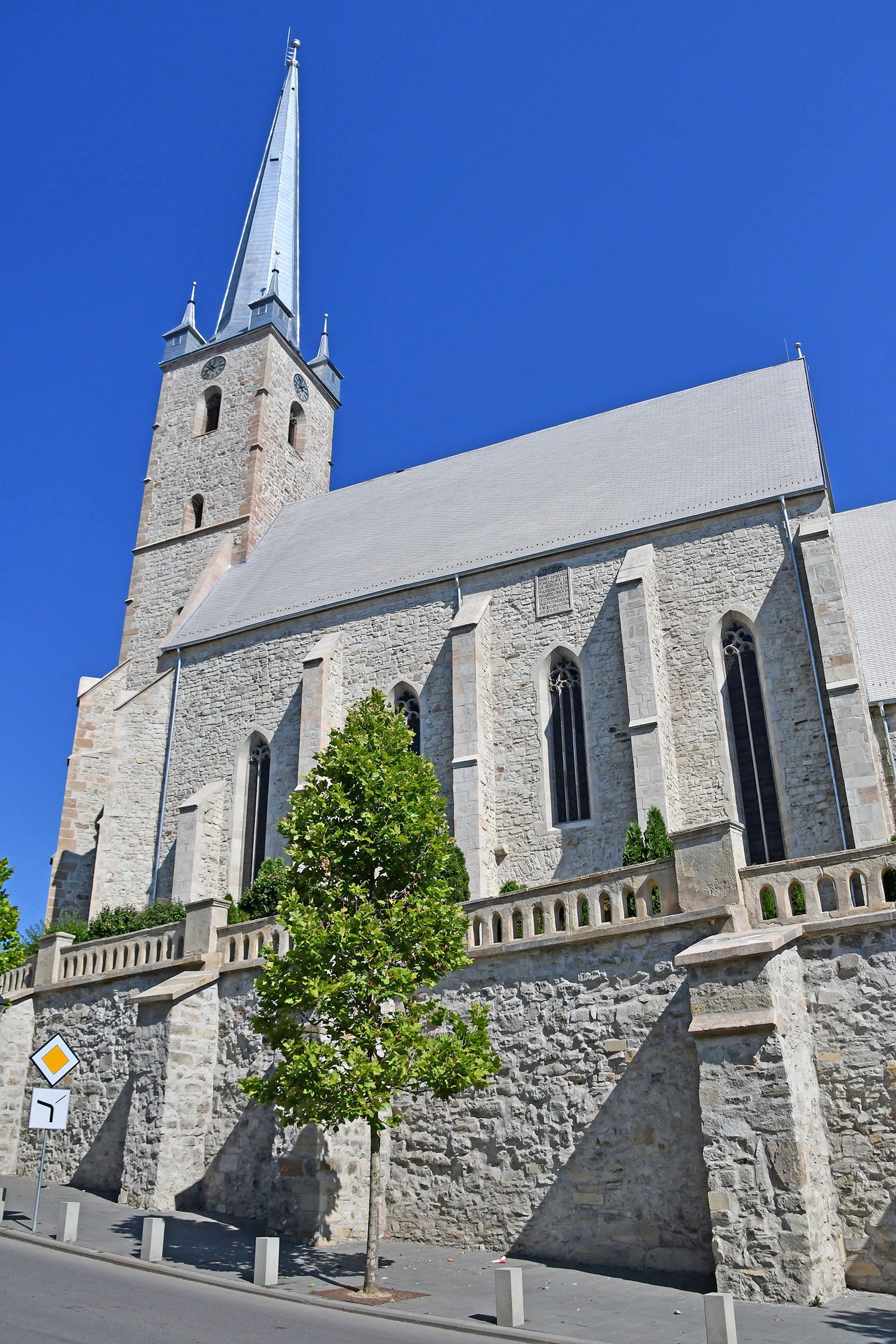
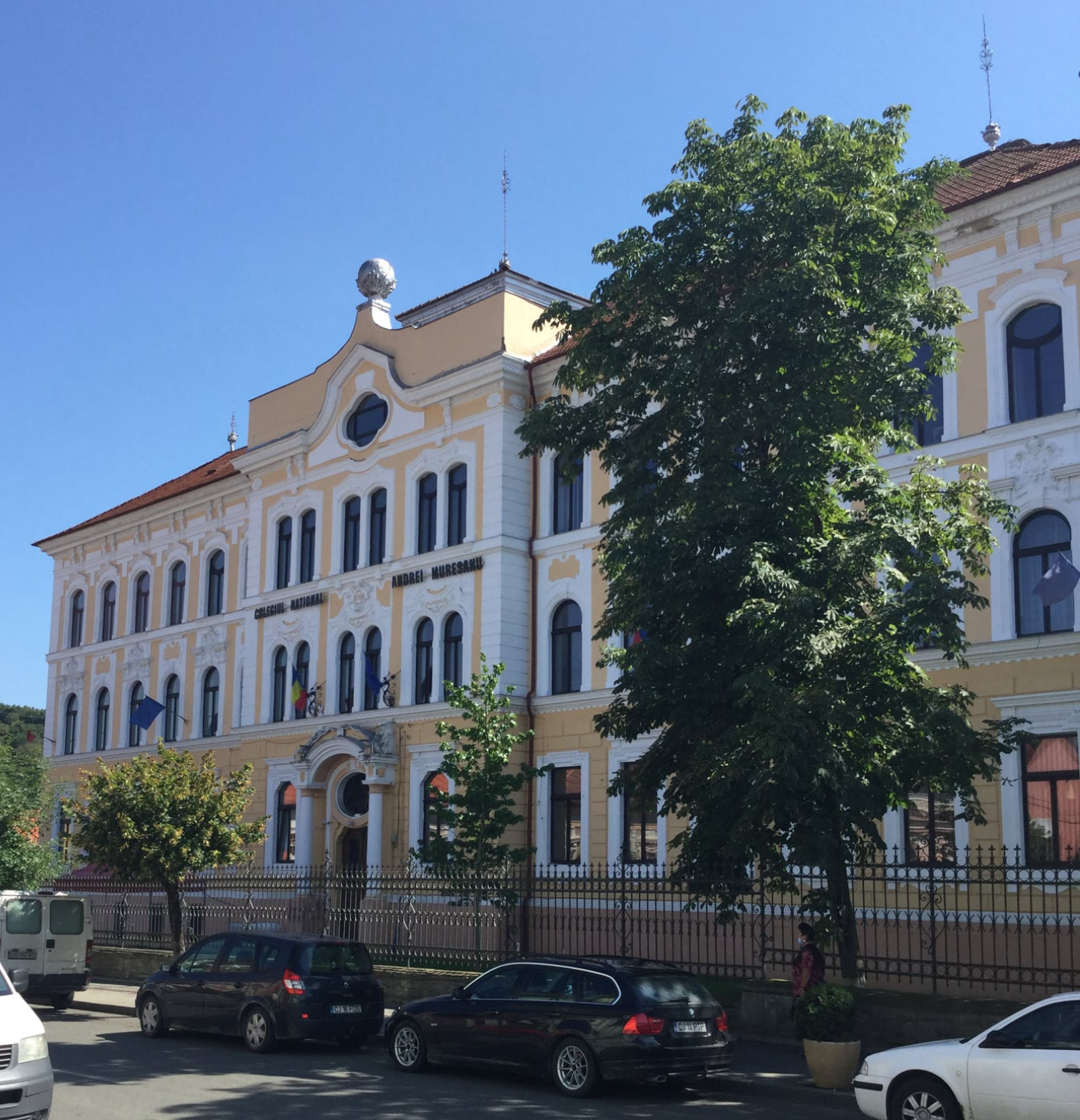
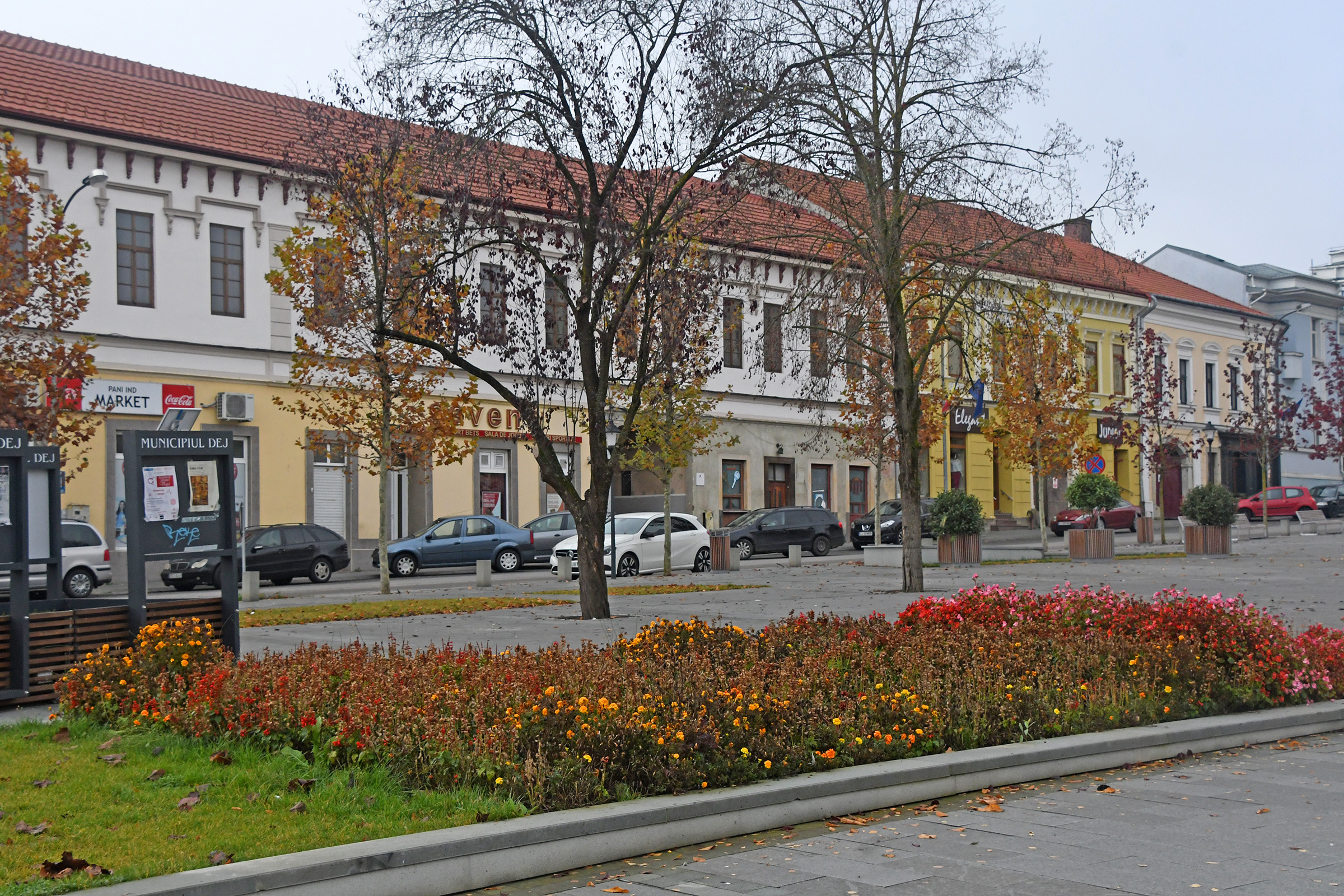
- Reformed Church Andrei Mureșanu National College Central Square

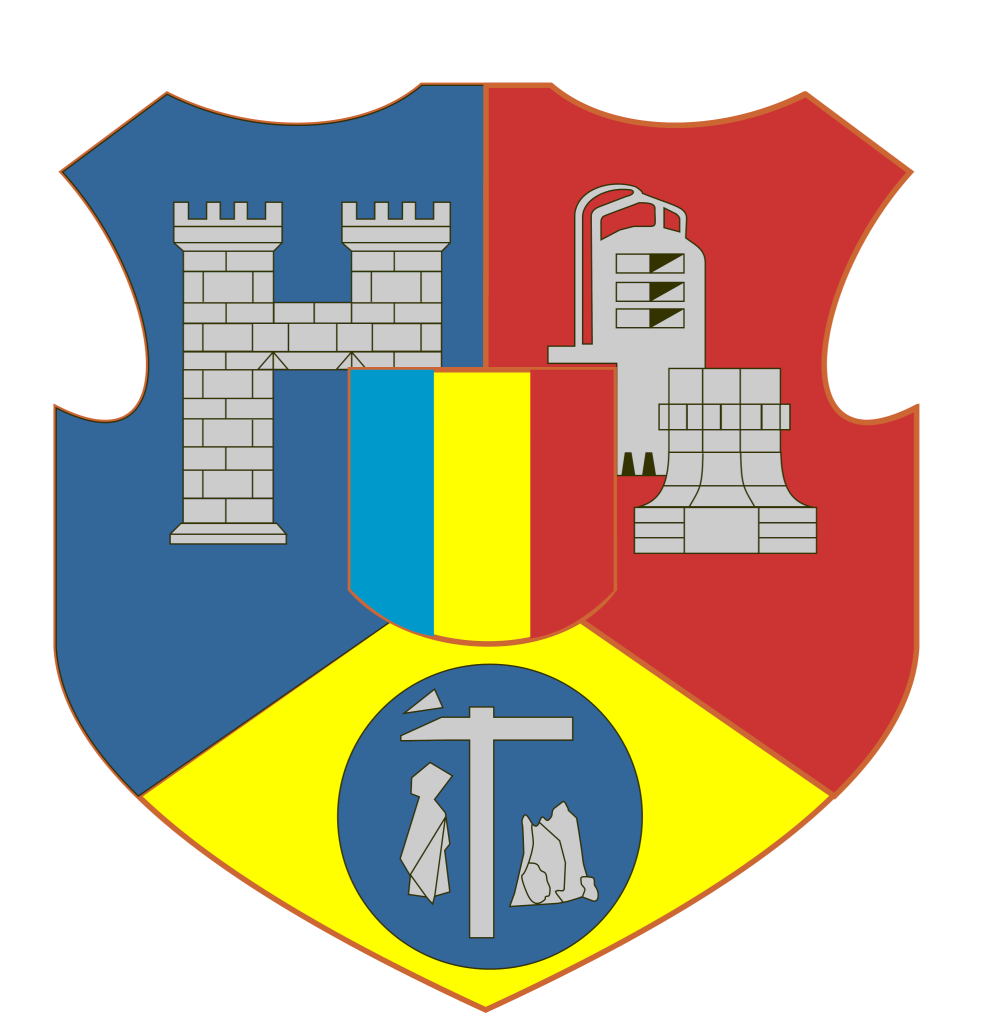
- Coat of arms

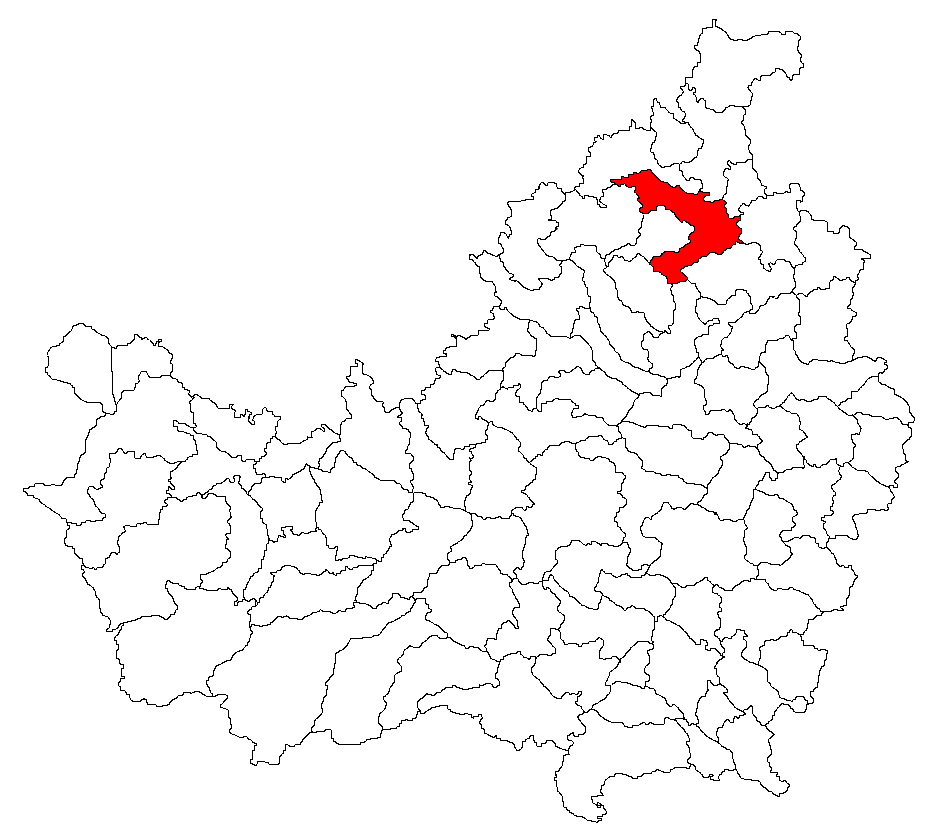
- Location in Cluj County

- Location in Romania
- Coordinates: 47°08′33″N 23°52′29″E
- Country: Romania
- County: Cluj

Government
  - Mayor (2024–2028): Costan Morar (PNL)
- Area: 109.12 km^{2} (42.13 sq mi)
- Elevation: 285 m (935 ft)
- Time zone: UTC+02:00 (EET)
  - Summer (DST): UTC+03:00 (EEST)
- Postal code: 405200
- Area code: +40 x64
- Vehicle reg.: CJ
- Website: www.primariadej.ro

Dej (Romanian pronunciation: [deʒ]; Hungarian: Dés; German: Desch, Burglos; Yiddish: דעעש Desh) is a municipality in Transylvania, Romania, 60 kilometres (37 mi) north of Cluj-Napoca, in Cluj County. It lies where the river Someșul Mic meets the river Someșul Mare. The city administers four villages: Ocna Dejului (Désakna), Peștera (Pestes), Pintic (Oláhpéntek), and Șomcutu Mic (Kissomkút).

The city lies at the crossroads of important railroads and highways linking it to Cluj-Napoca, Baia Mare, Satu Mare, Deda, Bistrița, and Vatra Dornei.

== History ==
Artifacts dating back to 5500 BC and belonging to the Starčevo–Körös–Criș culture, as well as artifacts dating back to the 15th century BC and belonging to the Wietenberg culture from the Bronze Age have been discovered on the territory of Dej. Also in the Bronze Age, the exploitation of salt deposits in the area of today's city began and developed. During the Iron Age, the Geto-Dacian civilization arose and spread over a vast territory. The Someș Valley was an integral part of this historical evolution, as evidenced by archaeological discoveries in the area, such as the Dacian fortress at Dealul Florilor. After the Dacian Wars, Emperor Trajan transformed most of Dacia into a Roman province; the territory of the city became part of the province of Dacia Superior, and later Dacia Porolissensis.

According to Gesta Hungarorum, Vlach political formations located in the north and northwest of Transylvania, led by Gelou, Glad, and Menumorut were conquered by the Hungarian tribes at the beginning of the tenth century. During the Menumorut voivodeship, the defense of the salt road was ensured by the fortresses from Ocna Dej and Cuzdrioara and the fortified points from Uriu and Urișor. The extension of the Kingdom of Hungary to the center and south of Transylvania was achieved with the help of Székely and German settlers. The first German settlers arrived in the Dej area in the years 1141–1143, entering from Satu Mare to Dej, Bistrița, Cluj, and Reghin. After leaving Holland and Flanders because of the floods of the sea, they settled in this region and founded the city of Dej.

The city was first mentioned in 1214 as Dees, in 1236 as Deeswar, in 1310 as Deesvitta, in 1351 both Deés and Deésvár occurred, the earlier has been used until eventually it was changed to Dés. It had a royal charter as a free city and was the capital of Szolnok-Doboka County. In 1905, it had a Protestant church from the 15th century, and a tower from 16th century fortifications. It was primarily a market town for local wines and other agricultural products.

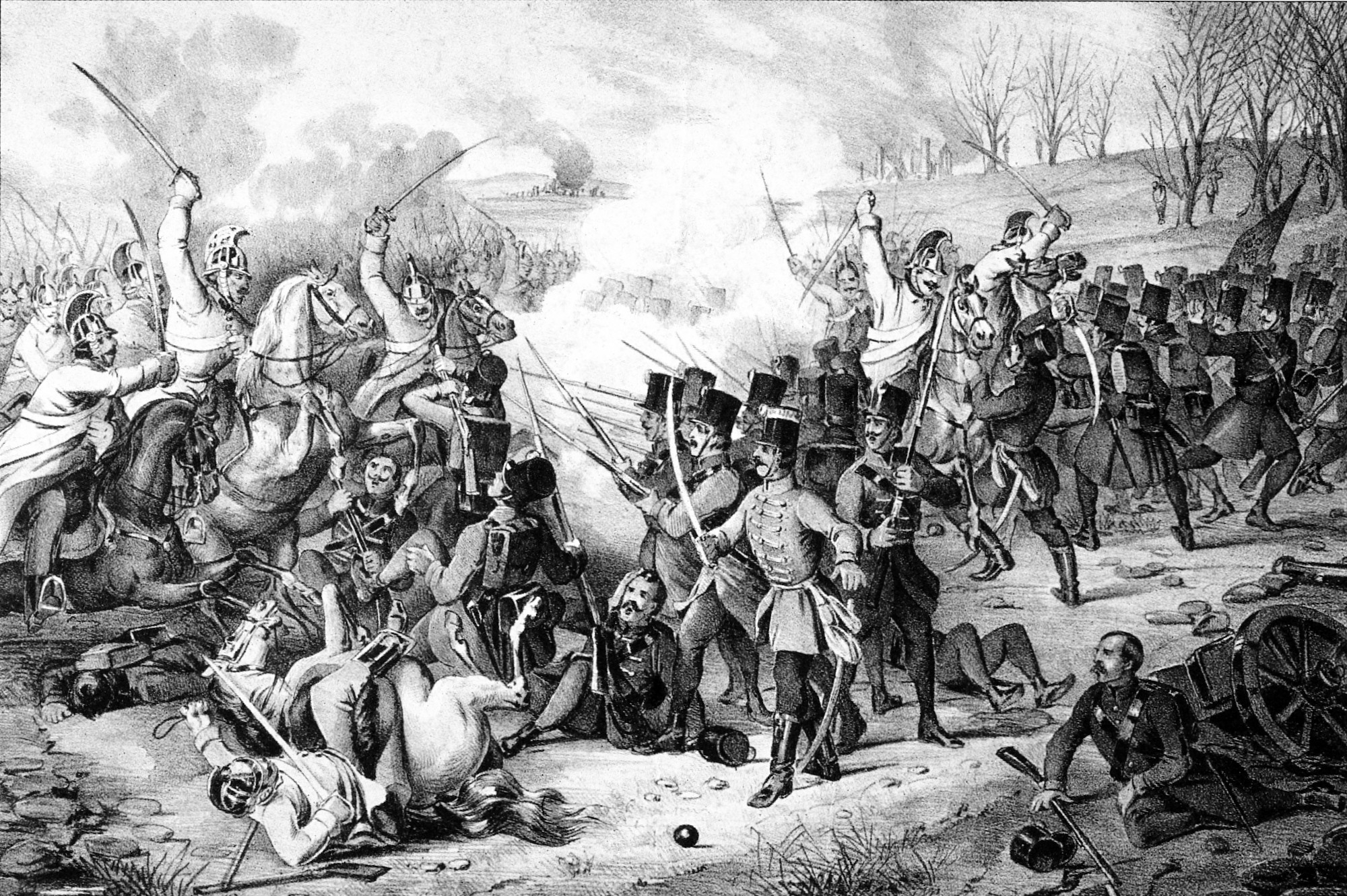
The Battle of Dés on November 24, 1848. Major Miklós Katona's troops are defeated by Karl von Urban's army.

During the Hungarian Revolution of 1848 the city of Dés was the scene of military confrontations between units of the Hungarian army and units of the Austrian army, which included Romanian border regiments and Romanian peasants, under the command of colonel Karl von Urban. The biggest battle for control of Dés took place on 24 November 1848 in the Bungăr forest, and continued on the territory of the city. The Hungarian forces led by major Miklós Katona were put on the run by Von Urban, towards Nagybánya. More than 150 people fell in this battle; in their memory, the monument "The Sleeping Lion" was erected in 1889.

The 19th century was a period of profound urban transformation and modernization works for the city, including the building of the County Prefecture, the City Hall, the Rudolf Hospital, the Palace of Justice, the Greek Catholic Church, the theater, the army barracks, and the "Andrei Mureșanu” High School. In 1882, the Cluj–Apahida–Dej railway line was opened, with an extension to Ocna Dej, while in 1910 the Ferdinand mine was electrified. The Dej Prison, located in the northern part of the town, was completed in 1894.

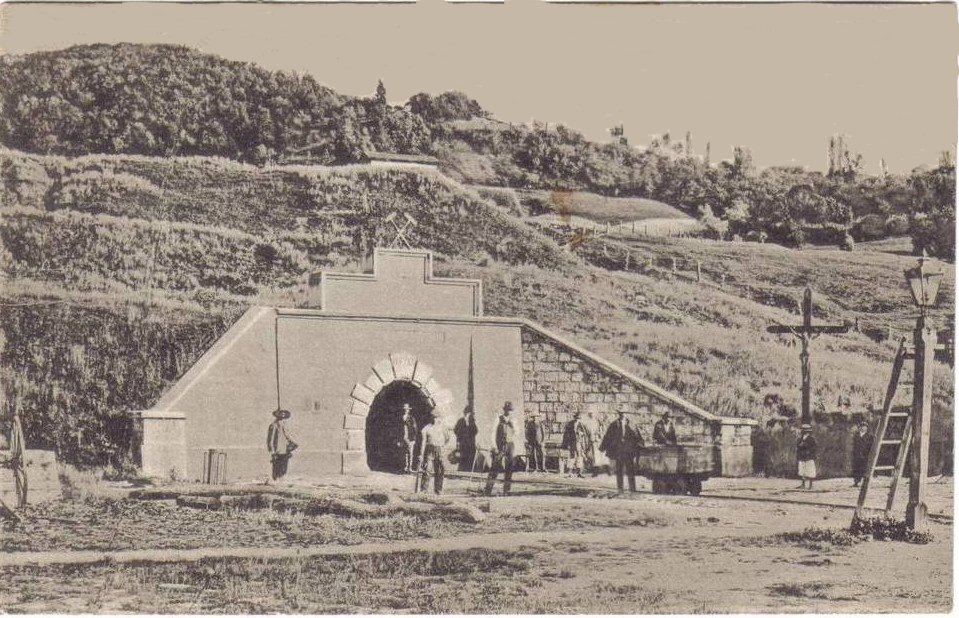
Entrance to the Ocna Dej salt mine, 19th century

On 1 December 1918, eleven delegates from Dej took part in the Romanian National Assembly in Alba Iulia, which proclaimed the union of Transylvania with Romania. In the aftermath of World War I and the ensuing Hungarian–Romanian War, the Romanian Army entered the city on 21 December 1918, and later the city became part of Romania. The interwar period brought important transformations to the city of Dej that allowed its development and modernization under the leadership of its mayor, Cornel Pop, who assumed the position in May 1920. From 1925 to 1938, the city was the county seat of Someș County, after which it became part of Ținutul Crișuri.

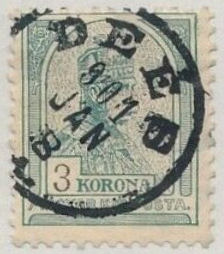
Kingdom of Hungary stamp used in Deés, 8 January 1901

In the wake of the Second Vienna Award of August 30, 1940, the territory of Northern Transylvania (of which the city of Dej was part) reverted to the Kingdom of Hungary. On September 8, 1940, the Hungarian administration was installed in Dej, and proceeded to take discriminatory measures against Romanians and Jews, forcing many Romanians to take refuge in Romania. In 1944 began the drama of the Jewish population in what was then Szolnok-Doboka County and its capital, Dés (Dej). Following several decrees of the Hungarian government and high-level consultations at a meeting on April 26 with László Endre in Szatmárnémeti (Satu Mare), it was decided to exterminate the Jews. On May 3, the city authorities launched the action of ghettoization of Jews in the Bungăr forest, where 3,700 Jews from Dej and 4,100 Jews from other localities in the county were imprisoned. During the operation of the Dej ghetto, Jews were mistreated, tortured, and starved. The deportation of the Jews to the Nazi death camps was done with freight wagons, in three stages: the first transport on May 28th when 3,150 Jews were deported; the second on June 6th, when 3,360 Jews were deported; the third on June 8th, when the last 1,364 Jews were deported. Most of those deported were exterminated in the Auschwitz–Birkenau camp, with just over 800 deportees surviving.

Towards the end of World War II, Romanian and Soviet armies entered the city on October 15, 1944. The territory of Northern Transylvania remained under Soviet military administration until March 9, 1945, after the appointment of Petru Groza as Prime Minister. After the elections of November 1946, residents of villages near Dej revolted against the falsification of the election results by the communist authorities and launched the first revolt against the new regime, being stopped by armed troops at the Someș bridge. The name of the city was related to the name of the first Romanian Communist Party leader, Gheorghe Gheorghiu-Dej who lived here in 1931 and worked at the railway station. When he became the de facto ruler of the country, Gheorghe Gheorghiu officially took the name of the city and supported the economic development of the locality. The communist regime brought with it fundamental transformations in the political, administrative and economic life of the city. Many previous leaders fell victim to the regime, as happened with the former mayor, Cornel Pop, who died in Văcărești prison in 1953. Another personality, ex-Prime Minister Alexandru Vaida-Voevod, a native of nearby Bobâlna, was arrested in March 1945 by the dreaded Securitate and died under house arrest in 1950.

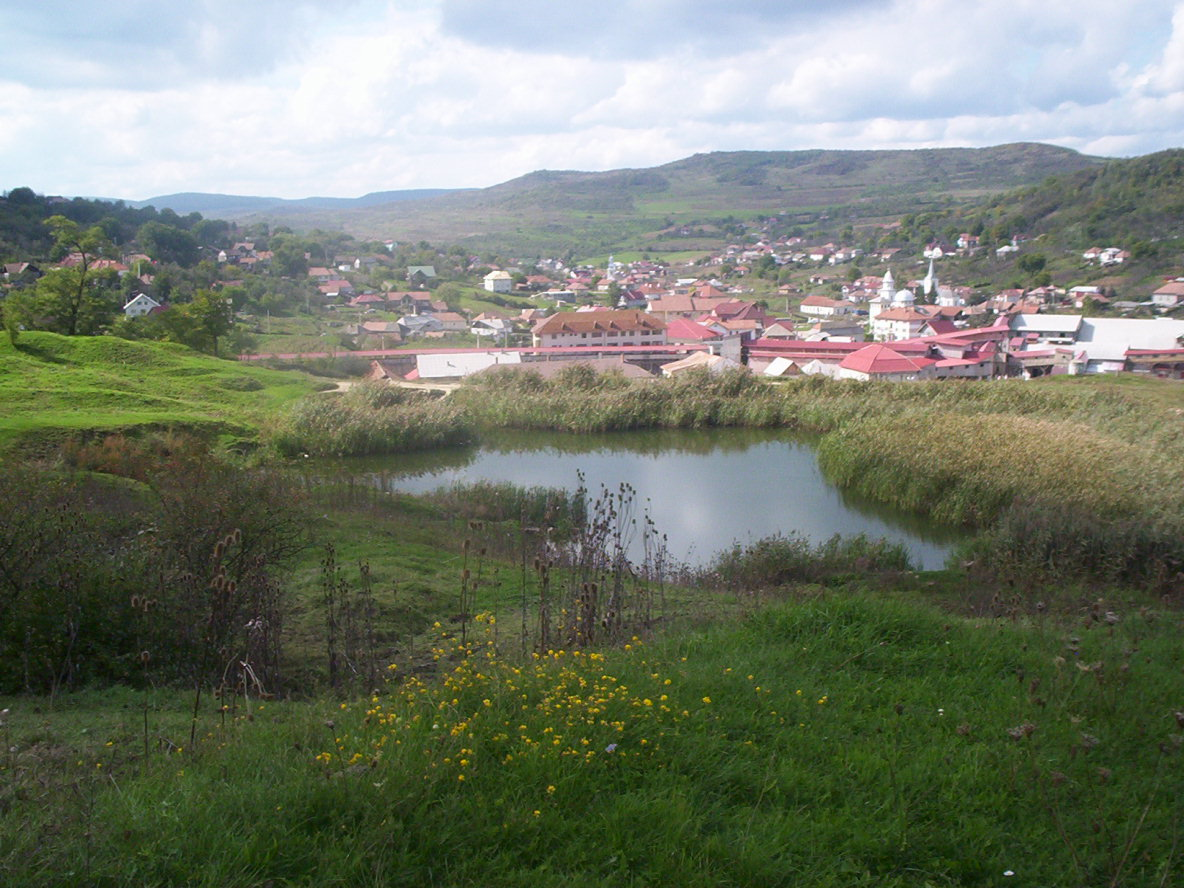
Ocna Dej, with Lake Iosif (on the site of the caved-in Iosif mine) in the foreground

In December 1950, Someș County was abolished, and Dej District was organized in its place within the Cluj Region. Following the administrative reform of 1968, the city of Dej was declared a municipality within Cluj County. A tragic event in the history of the city were the catastrophic floods of May 1970, when all the low areas of the city were under water and 6 people drowned. After the Romanian Revolution of 1989, state-owned enterprises were privatized, an environment for developing a market economy was created, new production units with domestic and foreign capital were set up, and many small and medium-sized enterprises emerged in Dej. The educational institutions, the municipal hospital, the cultural institutions were modernized, new churches were built, and the infrastructure of the city was updated.

== Geography ==
Dej is a city located in northwestern Romania, within the historical region of Transylvania and northern Cluj County. It is situated on the left bank of the Someș River, just downstream from the confluence of the Someșul Mare and Someșul Mic branches. The city lies at an elevation of 250 to 350 meters above sea level, nestled at the meeting point of the Someș terraces and the Dej Hills. Dej is located approximately 60 kilometers north-northeast of the county seat, Cluj-Napoca, at the geographical coordinates of 47°08′32″N 23°52′29″E.

=== Climate ===
Dej has a moderate humid continental climate, primarily influenced by western maritime air masses with minor variations from southwestern air masses, resulting in relatively stable temperatures throughout the year. The transition from winter to spring is gradual, while summers are typically mild. Due to its location within the Someș valley corridor, the city frequently experiences thermal inversions during the winter, though severe blizzards and extreme snowfall are rare. Average annual precipitation is 632 mm (24.9 inches), peaking during the warmer months, particularly in June, which averages between 80 and 100 mm. Rainfall during the warm season is often heavy and convective in nature. Conversely, the driest period occurs between autumn and spring, accounting for approximately 42% of the annual total. The town has a temperature amplitude of 73.6 °C, which is very high for European standards.

Climate data for Dej (elevation 232m, 2014–2026 normals, extremes 1961–present)
Month	Jan	Feb	Mar	Apr	May	Jun	Jul	Aug	Sep	Oct	Nov	Dec	Year
Record high °C (°F)	15.9 (60.6)	19.8 (67.6)	26.9 (80.4)	30.7 (87.3)	32.8 (91.0)	37.5 (99.5)	38.2 (100.8)	38.4 (101.1)	34.6 (94.3)	27.9 (82.2)	26.7 (80.1)	15.3 (59.5)	38.4 (101.1)
Mean daily maximum °C (°F)	2.2 (36.0)	6.5 (43.7)	12.6 (54.7)	17.5 (63.5)	21.9 (71.4)	26.9 (80.4)	28.4 (83.1)	29.2 (84.6)	23.9 (75.0)	17.0 (62.6)	9.6 (49.3)	4.1 (39.4)	16.7 (62.0)
Daily mean °C (°F)	−1.2 (29.8)	2.1 (35.8)	6.2 (43.2)	10.6 (51.1)	15.3 (59.5)	20.2 (68.4)	21.4 (70.5)	21.5 (70.7)	16.9 (62.4)	10.9 (51.6)	5.5 (41.9)	1.5 (34.7)	10.9 (51.6)
Mean daily minimum °C (°F)	−4.7 (23.5)	−2.3 (27.9)	−0.2 (31.6)	3.6 (38.5)	8.7 (47.7)	13.6 (56.5)	14.4 (57.9)	13.9 (57.0)	10.0 (50.0)	4.8 (40.6)	1.4 (34.5)	−1.2 (29.8)	5.2 (41.3)
Record low °C (°F)	−35.2 (−31.4)	−34.5 (−30.1)	−22.3 (−8.1)	−9.7 (14.5)	−2.9 (26.8)	1.4 (34.5)	4.3 (39.7)	3.5 (38.3)	−4.4 (24.1)	−18.6 (−1.5)	−24.3 (−11.7)	−26.5 (−15.7)	−35.2 (−31.4)
Average precipitation mm (inches)	39.4 (1.55)	33.9 (1.33)	37.6 (1.48)	43.9 (1.73)	66.8 (2.63)	80.2 (3.16)	67.8 (2.67)	52.2 (2.06)	54.1 (2.13)	46.5 (1.83)	48.7 (1.92)	41.2 (1.62)	612.3 (24.11)
Average precipitation days (≥ 1.0 mm)	9.3	7.0	7.2	7.2	9.4	9.2	8.8	5.8	6.6	8.2	8.9	8.0	95.6
Average snowy days	8.8	4.6	1.4	1.1	0	0	0	0	0	0.1	1.8	5.3	23.1
Source 1: Meteomanz (2014-2026); Infoclimat (1980-2010); ANM
Source 2: Inversiuni Termice (1961-2000)

== Demographics ==
Historical population
Year	Pop.	±%
1910	11,452	—
1930	15,110	+31.9%
1948	14,681	−2.8%
1956	19,281	+31.3%
1966	26,984	+40.0%
1977	32,345	+19.9%
1992	41,216	+27.4%
2002	38,478	−6.6%
2011	33,497	−12.9%
2021	31,475	−6.0%
Source: Census data

At the 2021 Romanian census, Dej had a population of 31,475, a drop of 6% from the previous census. At the 2011 census, there were 33,497 people living within the city; of those, 81.8% were ethnic Romanians, while 11.3% were ethnic Hungarians, 1.0% Roma, and 0.1% others.

== Natives ==
- Nicolae Blatt (ophthalmologist, surgeon, and medical researcher)
- Dan Bucșa (footballer)
- Zsigmond Czakó (playwright, actor)
- Ciprian Deac (footballer)
- Adrian Falub (footballer)
- Liviu Goian (footballer)
- Cătălin Itu (footballer)
- Lajos Ilosvay (chemist, professor, politician)
- János Jagamas (ethnomusicologist, folk song collector, professor)
- Theodor Mihali (politician)
- Mihai Moldovan (composer, music editor)
- Ana Novac (writer)
- Paul Papp (footballer)
- Adriana Săftoiu (journalist, politician)
- Lavinia Șandru (journalist, politician)
- Alexandru Sencovici (politician)
- Itamar Singer (author, historian)
- Raoul Șorban (painter, journalist, writer, essayist, art historian, academic, and memoirist)
- Károly Ferenc Szabó (politician)
- Géza Teleki (politician)
- Călin Zanc (footballer)

== Gallery ==
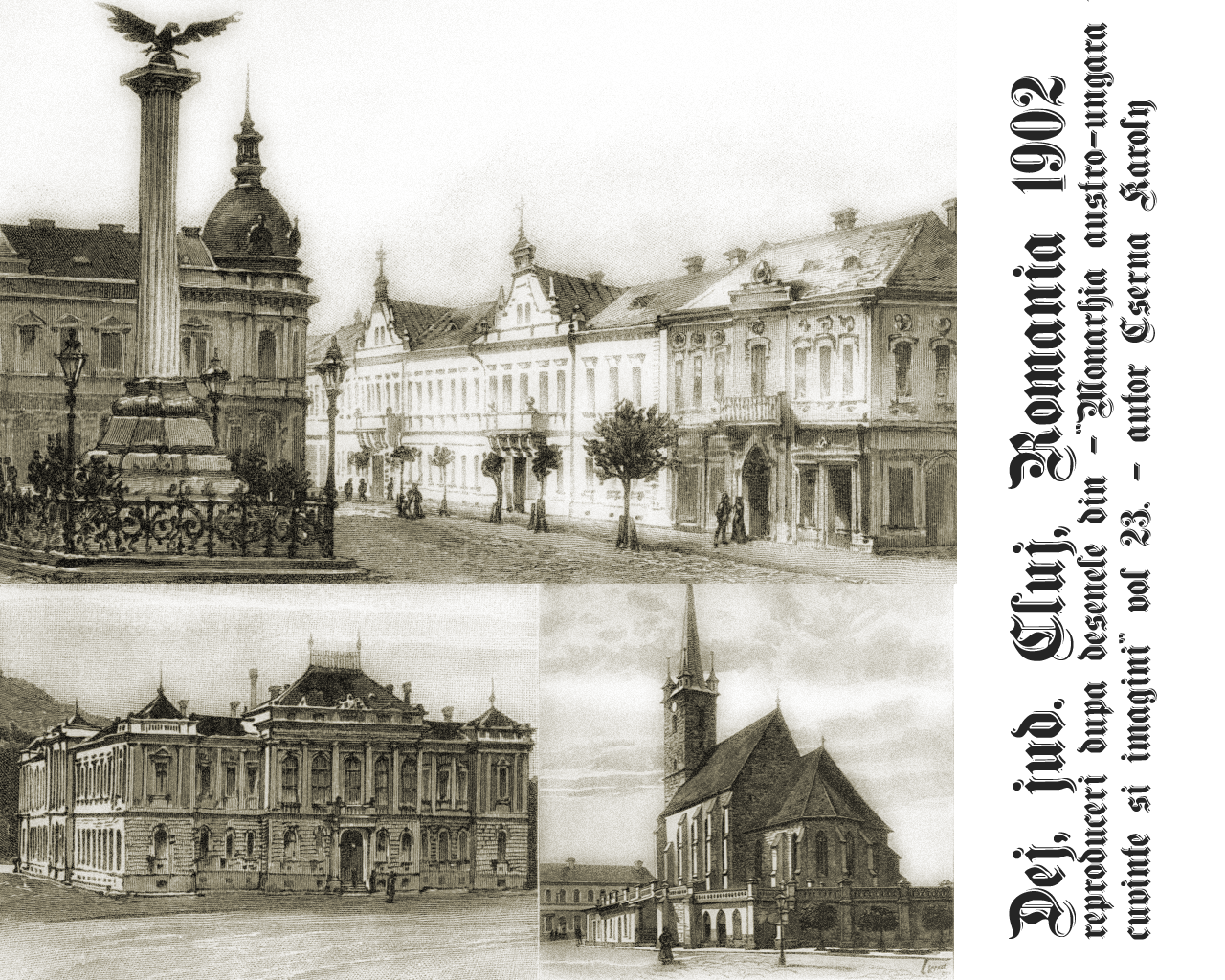
Dej in 1902

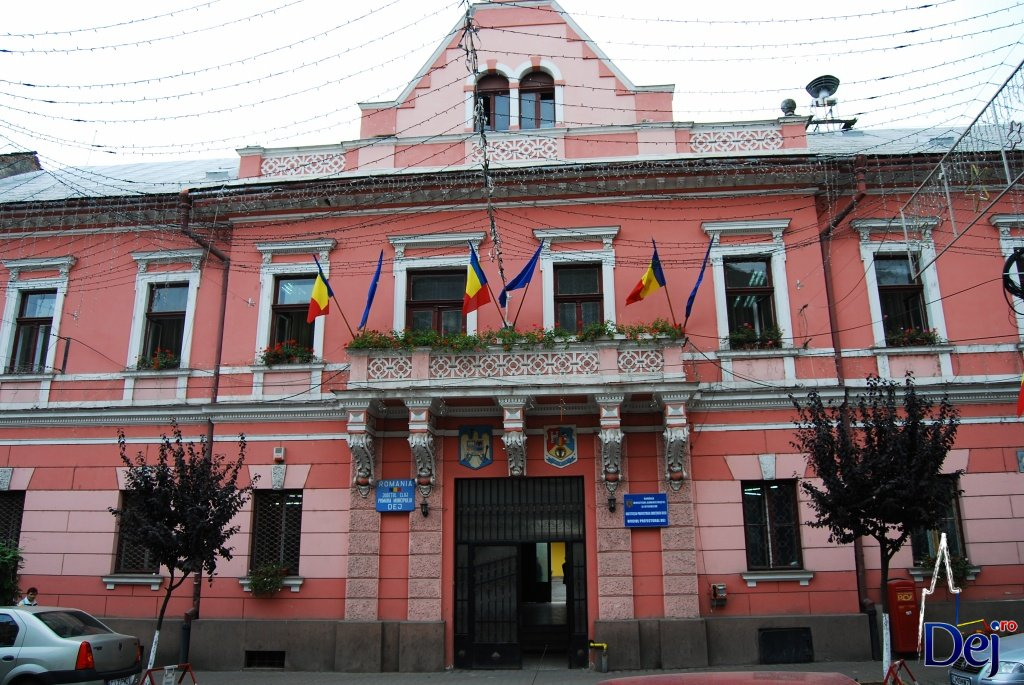
The City Hall

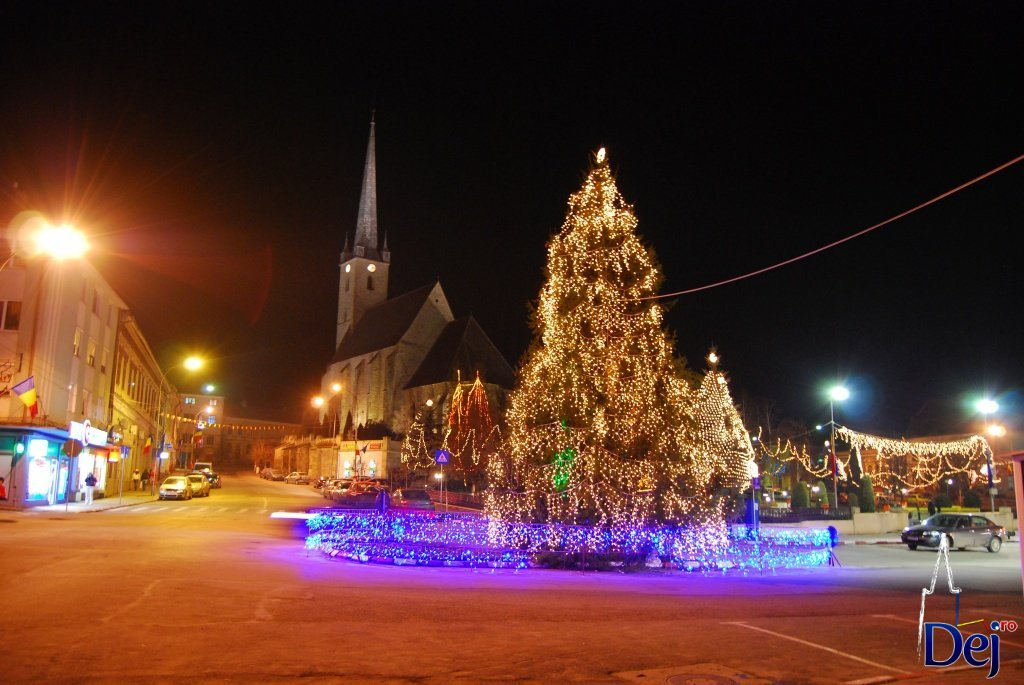
City Square at Night

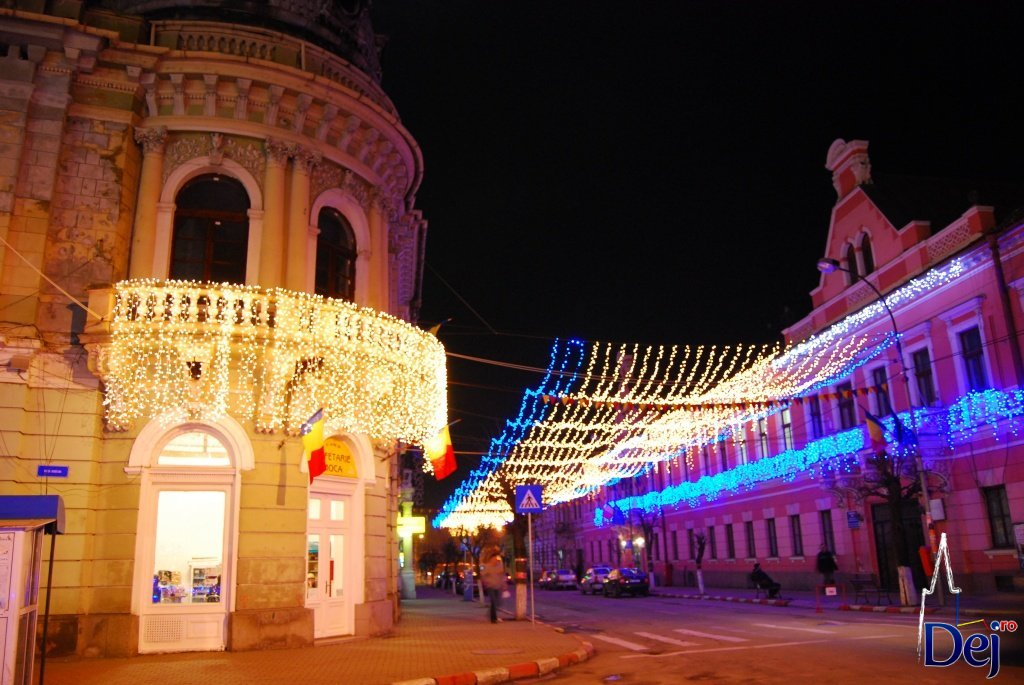
Avram Iancu Street

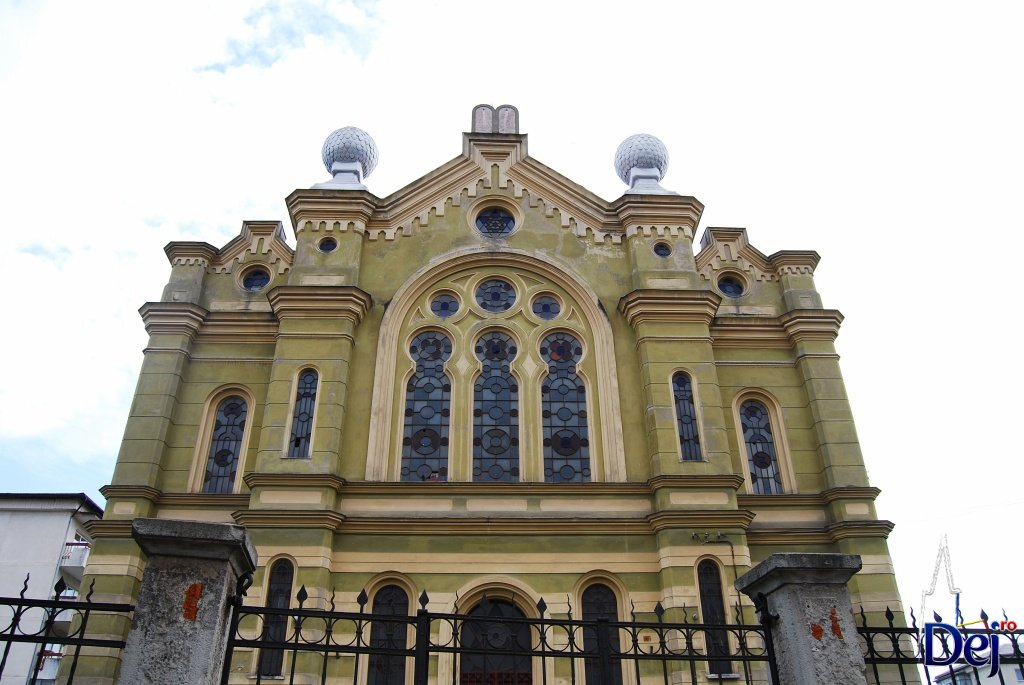
Synagogue in Dej

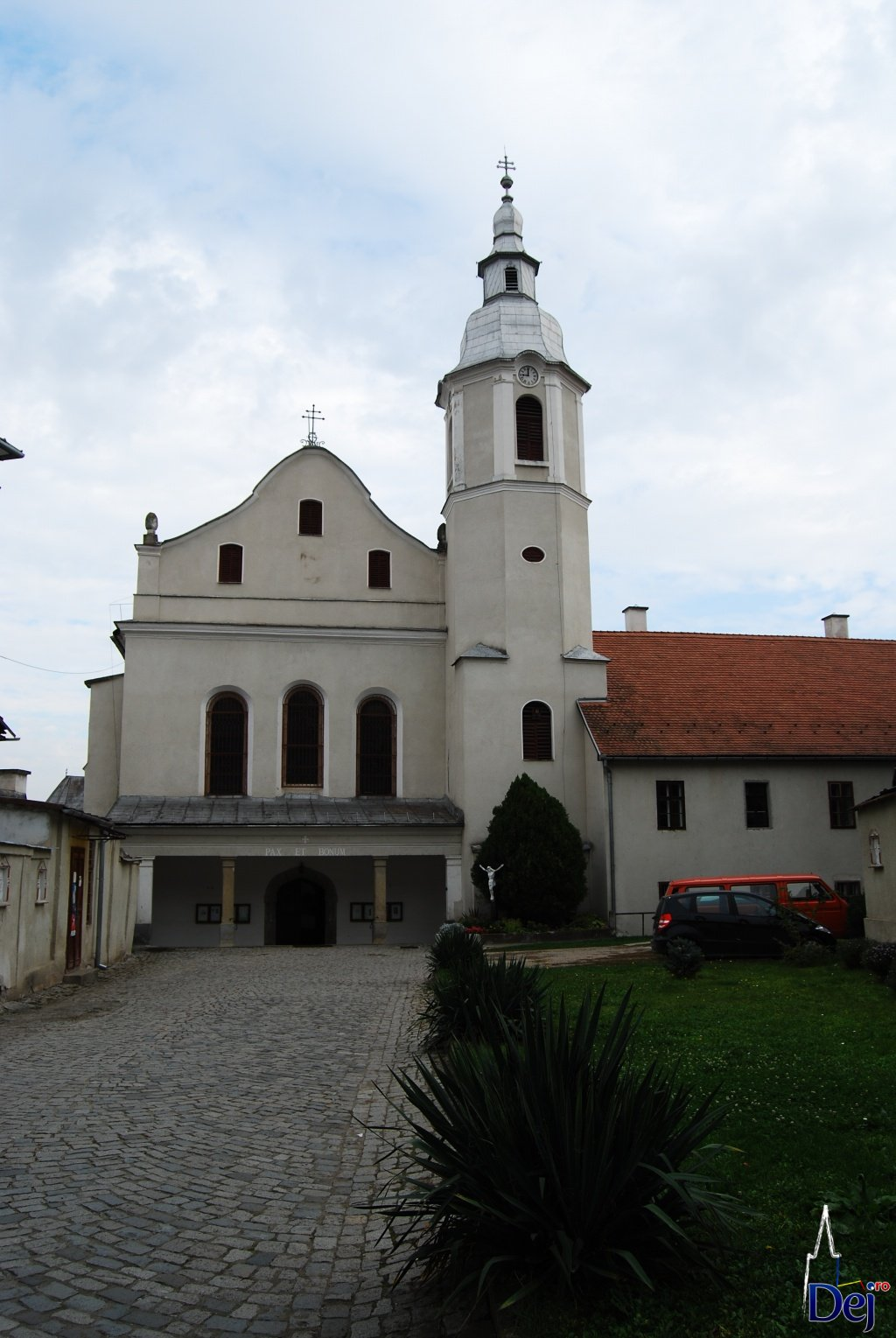
The Roman Catholic Church

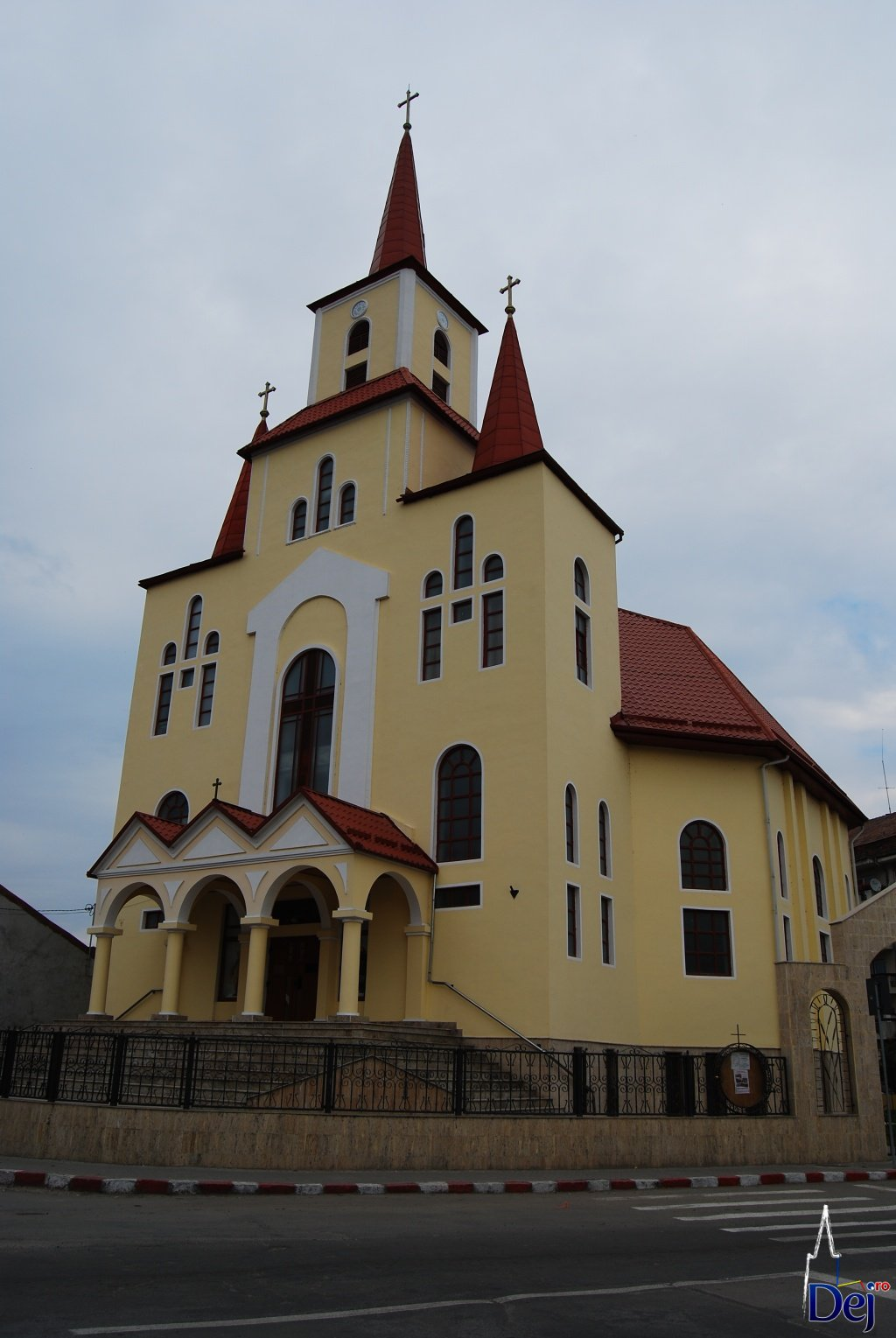
Greek-Catholic Church in 1 Mai

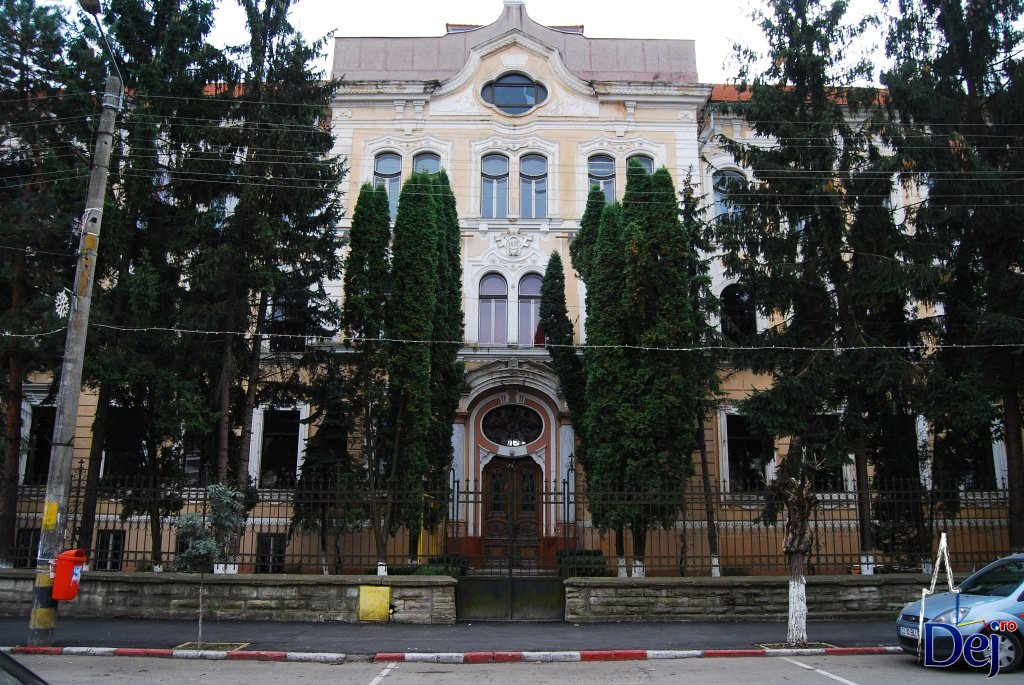
Andrei Mureșanu National College
