= János Kemény =

János Kemény or Kemény János may refer to:

- János Kemény (writer) (1903–1971), Hungarian writer, theater director and dramatist
- John G. Kemeny (1926–1992), Hungarian American mathematician, computer scientist and educator
- John Kemeny (film producer) (1925–2012), Hungarian-born film producer
- John Kemény (prince) (1607–1662), duke/prince of Transylvania
