= Zsigmond Czakó =

Hungarian actor and playwright

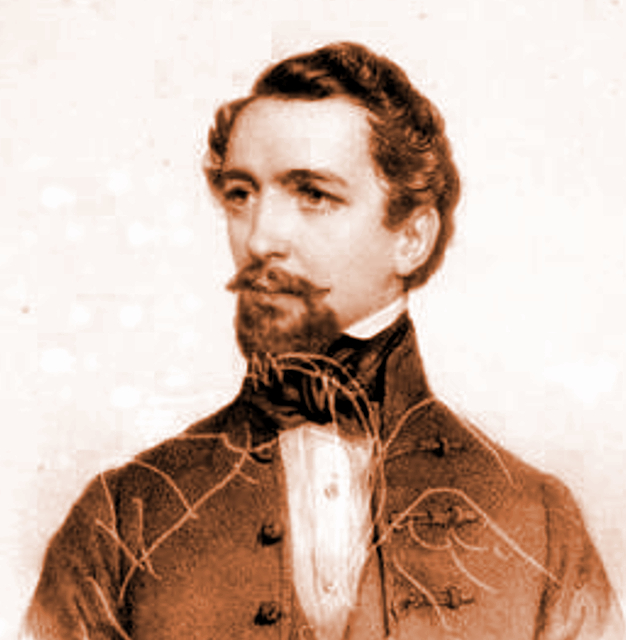
Zsigmond Czakó

Zsigmond Czakó (20 June 1820 – 14 December 1847) was a Hungarian actor and playwright.

== Life ==
Czakó was born on 20 June 1820 in Dés, Austrian Empire (now Dej, Romania). He studied philosophy and the law in Kolozsvár and Nagyenyed (now Cluj-Napoca and Aiud), and worked at the National Theatre of Hungary.

However, his dramas written after his first success (Leona and The Frivolous, first performed at the National Theatre on 25 February 1847) were much weaker than the first, the audience became colder and the criticism more severe, which made the young poet, who was already in a sick mood, despair. He was determined to create a work that would surpass all his previous plays. The result of his determination was his last play on historical subjects, The Knight John. (It was performed at the National Theatre on 13 March 1848.) He read his finished manuscript to some friends, who, perhaps a little too severely, but with sincerity of conviction, detected in it essential defects and considered it by no means as excellent as the author himself. This had such a crushing effect on him that soon after the severe criticism expressed by his friends, and without waiting for the performance of his work, he shot himself in the head with a pistol in the editorial office of the Pesti Hírlap. Petőfi and Arany also wrote poems in his memory.

He committed suicide in Pest on 14 December 1847, at the age of 27.

== Main works ==
- Kalmár és tengerész (1844)
- Szent László és kora (1844)
- Végrendelet (1845)
- Leona (1846)
- János lovag (1847)
- Könnyelműek (1847)
- Összes munkái (Redaktis József Ferenczy, I-II, Bp., 1883–84).
