= Nicolae Blatt =

Romanian ophthalmologist (1890–1965)

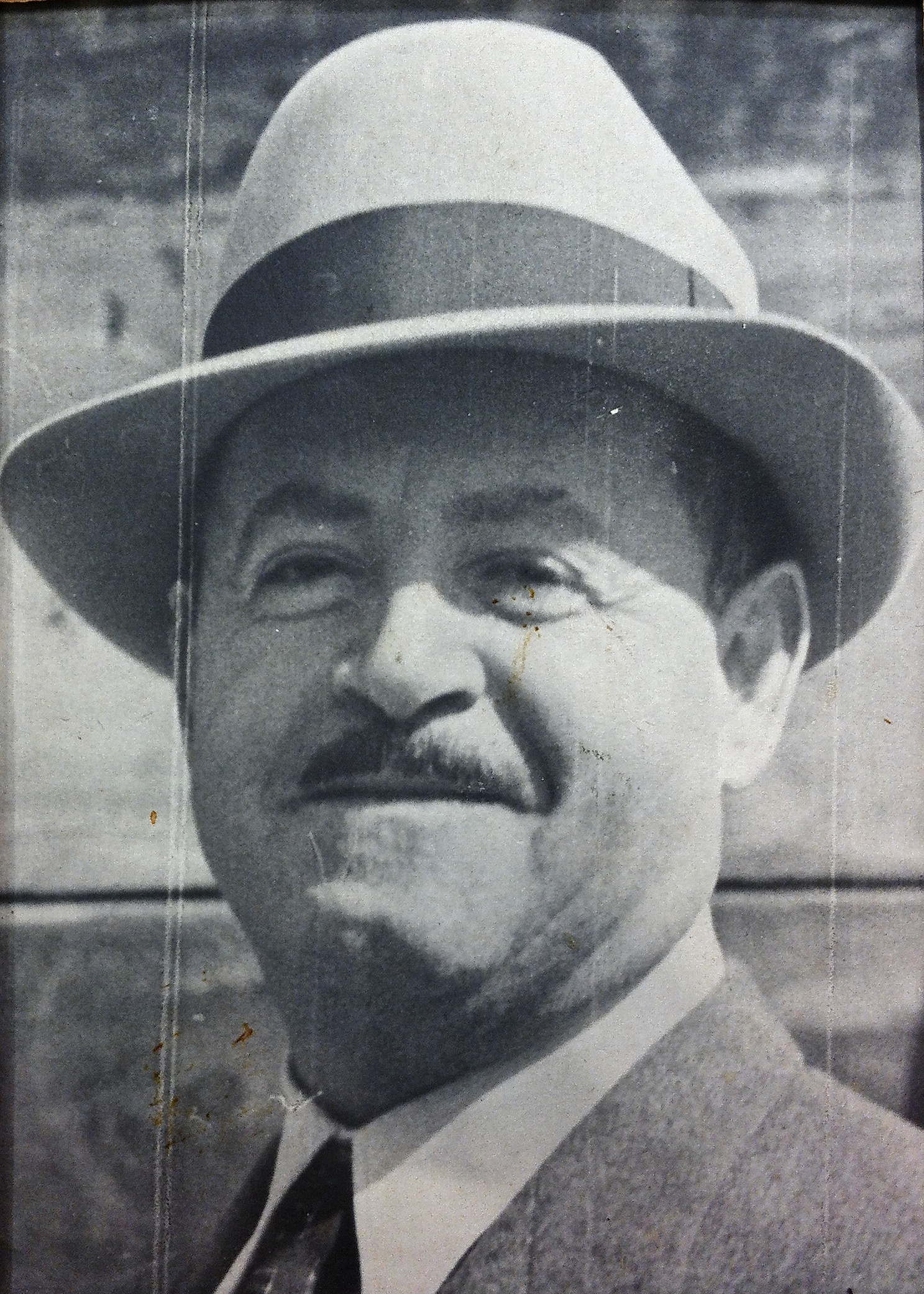
- Nicolae Blatt
- Born: 24 June 1890; Pintic, Austria-Hungary
- Died: 15 April 1965 (aged 74); Frankfurt, West Germany
- Occupation: Ophthalmologist
- Known for: contribution to the ophthalmological practice and research in Romania
- Spouse: Marta Scheiner (1904–1972)
- Children: Erica Blatt Harkins

Nicolae Blatt (24 June 1890 – 15 April 1965) was a Romanian ophthalmologist, surgeon, and medical researcher. He was the founder of the first Romanian journal of ophthalmology, "Revista de Oftalmologie" and he published numerous research papers and monographs in foreign ophthalmology journals. and foreign publications'. He was the official ophthalmologist to the Romanian Royal Court from 1931 to 1947 and during World War II secretly helped Queen Helen of Romania rescue Jewish families from concentration camps. Blatt held the positions of University Professor, Chair of the Clinic and Laboratories of the Department of Ophthalmology at the University Hospital of Timișoara, and the position of Chair of Ophthalmology at the "Institute for Specialization and Perfecting of Physicians" that was part of Carol Davila Medical University in Bucharest. He was a pioneer in research into trachoma, congenital cataracts, modern extracapsular cataract extraction, corneal transplantation and strabismus. During the Cold War the Romanian Workers' Party victimized him because of his past relations, scientific and political views. After the publication of his journal in Bucharest in 1949, he was labeled a "traitor and enemy of the glorious Romanian Popular Republic". He successfully left Romania in 1964. Shortly before his death he was nominated Guest Professor of Ophthalmology, and given a research laboratory, at the Goethe University Frankfurt in West Germany.

== Childhood and education ==
Blatt was born into a Jewish Hungarian family in Pintic, in the vicinity of Dej, then part of Austria-Hungary. He was baptized Lutheran. His parents Iacob Blatt (a lawyer) and Bertha Blatt, his older brother, and his two sisters were murdered in Auschwitz during the Holocaust.

In 1913 he graduated from the Medical School of Kolozsvár (Cluj-Napoca). During World War I, from 1914 to 1918, he was a military physician in the Austro-Hungarian Army. He completed his residency in ophthalmology in Cluj and Budapest, and over the following 5 years attended various fellowship training programs in ophthalmology abroad; those he worked under included J. Meller in Vienna, Emil Krückmann in Berlin, Alfred Vogt in Zurich, Jules Gonin in Lausanne, Henricus Weve in Utrecht, and Frank Juler in London.

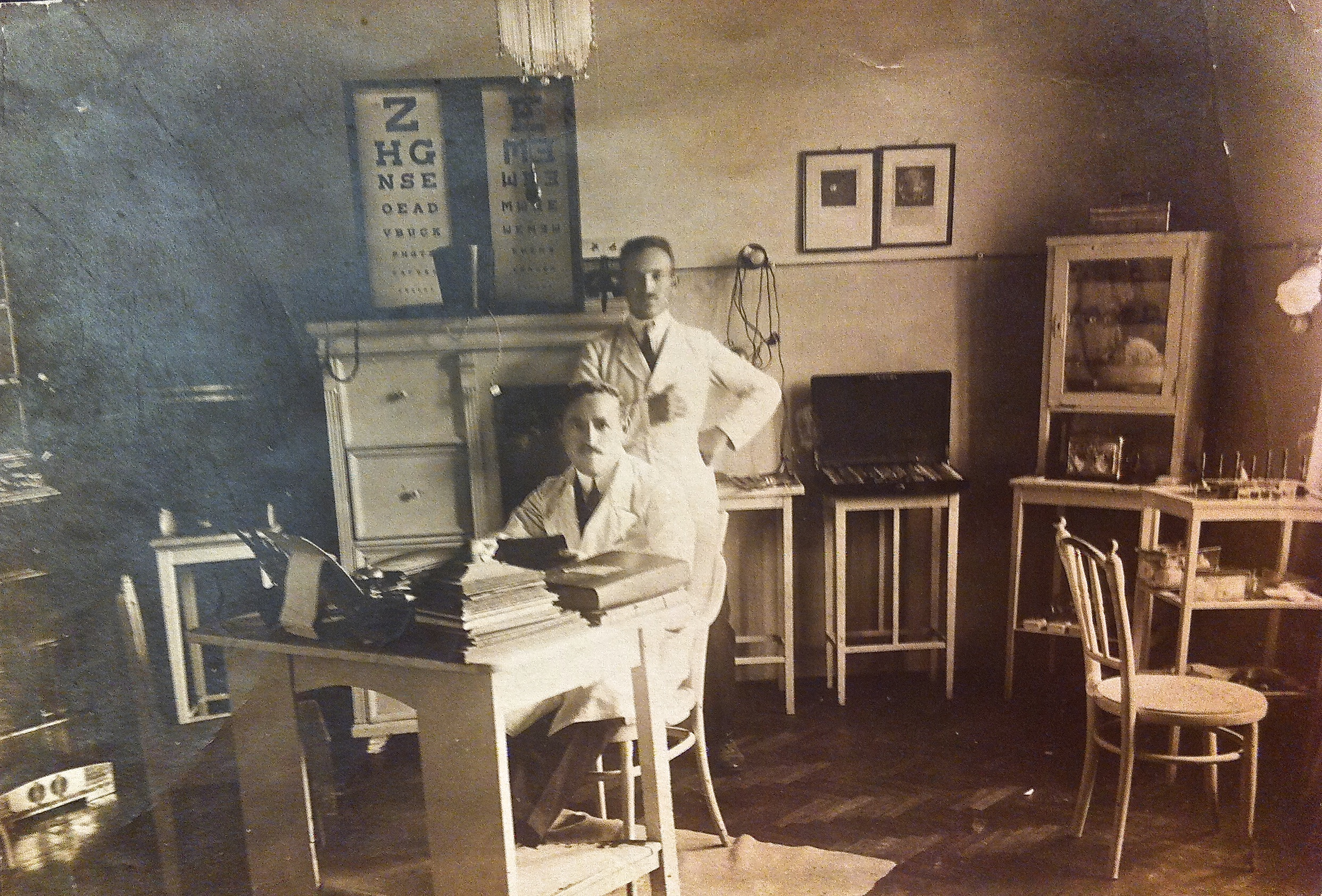
Nicolae Blatt in his office

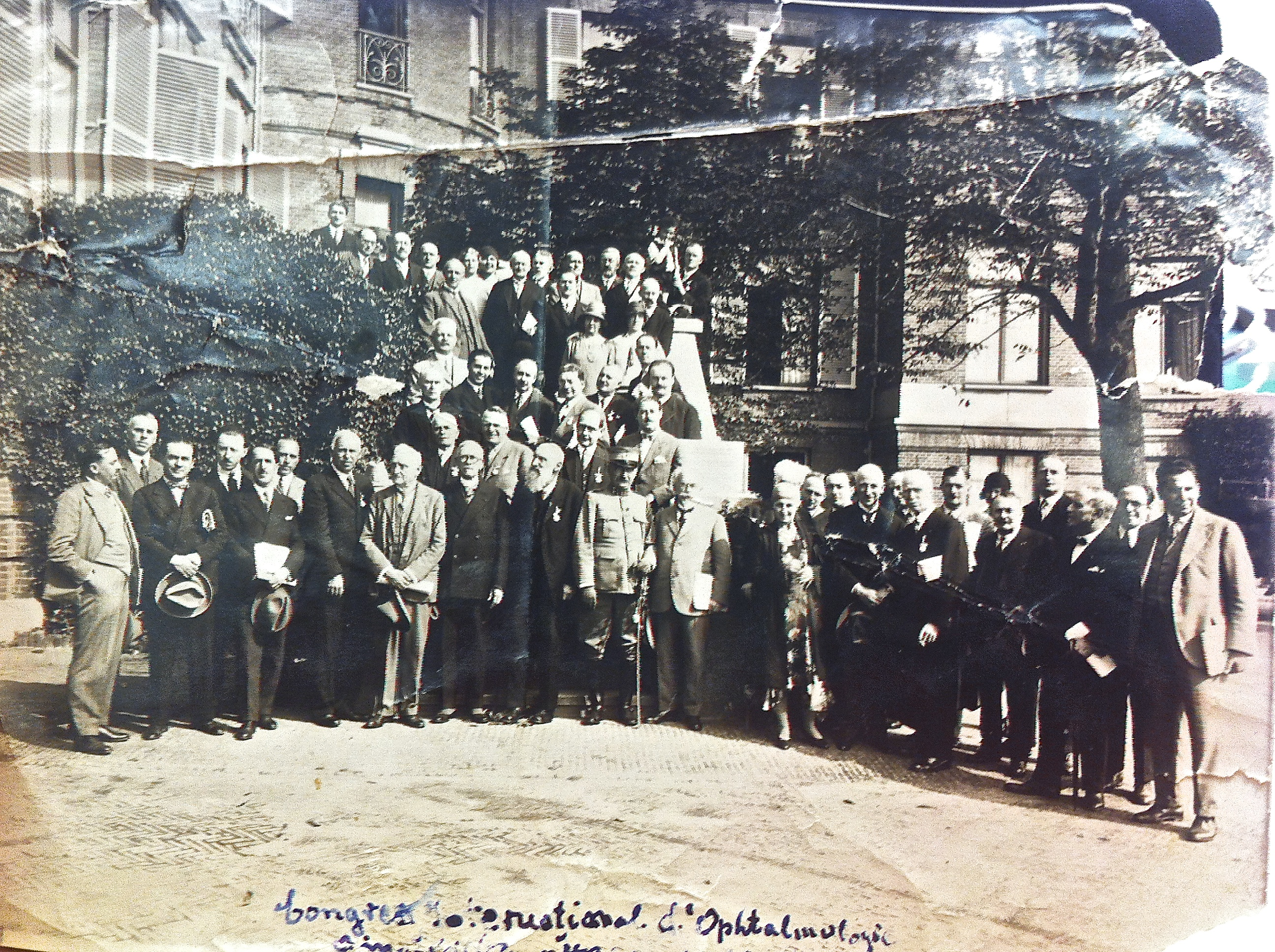
Nicolae Blatt participating at International Congress of Ophthalmology in Hague in 1939

== Career ==
=== Private practice and royal appointment ===
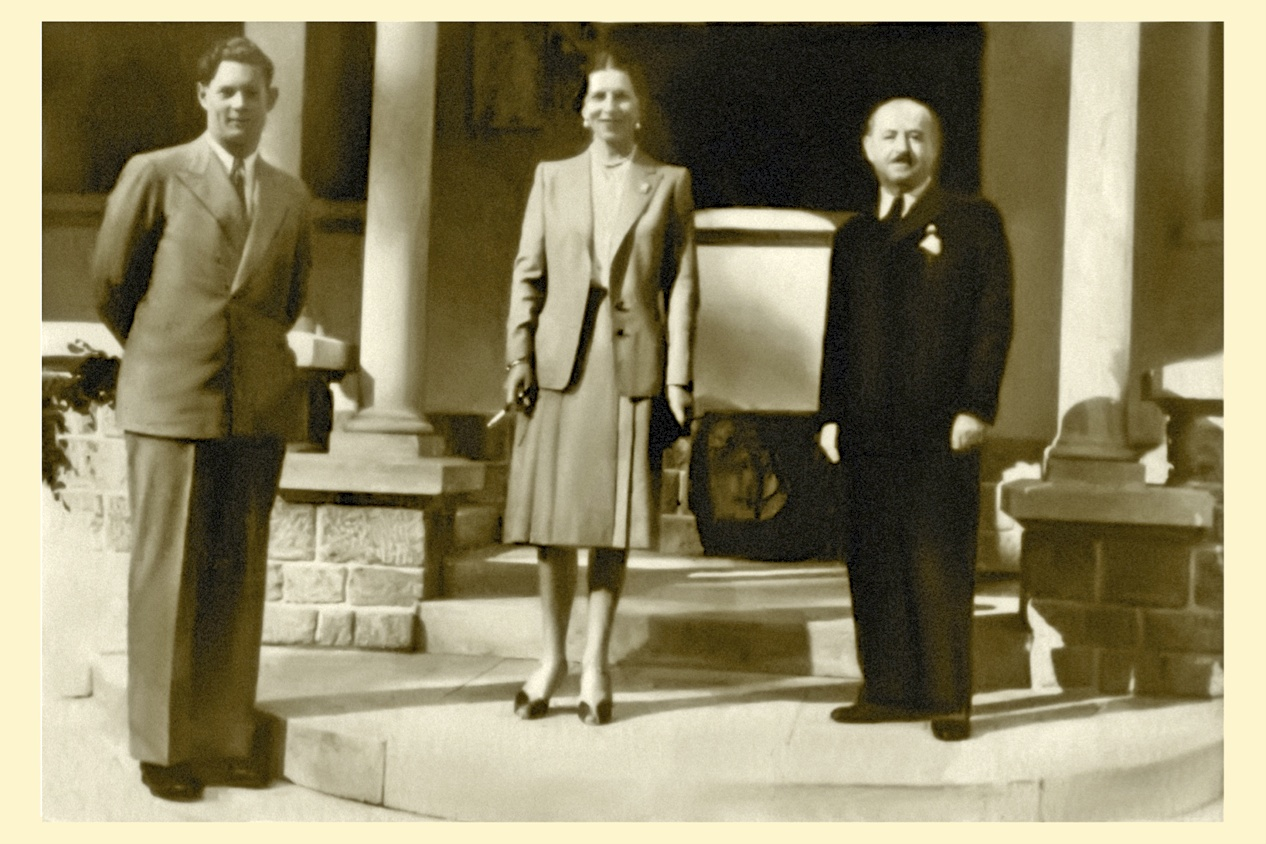
Blatt, King Michael I, and Queen Helen at Foisor Palace in Sinaia, 1940s

After returning home, Blatt opened a private practice in Târgu Mureș.

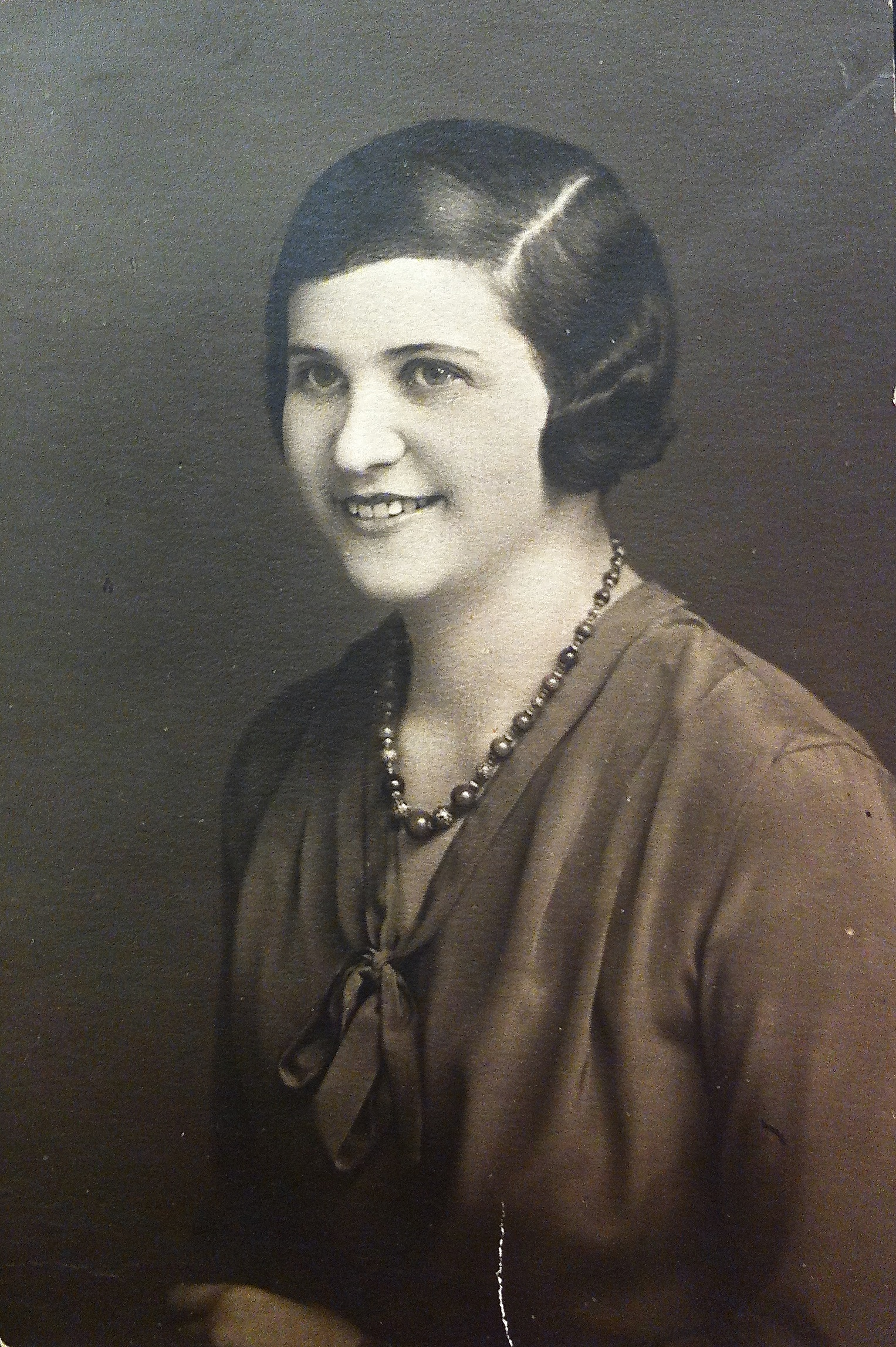
Marta Scheiner wife of Nicolae Blatt in 1930

In 1930 he married Marta Scheiner (1904–1972), a photographer and journalist, originally from Timișoara.

In Tirgu Mures, Blatt performed a successful emergency retinal detachment surgery on a member of the Greek Royal family, a close relative of Queen Helen of Romania. As a result, in 1931 he was invited to move to Bucharest to serve as official ophthalmologist to the Romanian royal court. He opened a practice there and was also appointed Docent Professor of Medicine at the Medical Faculty of Bucharest.

=== World War II ===
After Romania joined the Axis powers in 1940, the German army confiscated Blatt's medical office to house German officers and their families. He moved his practice into a three-room apartment, and he, his wife and daughter lived in one room until the end of the war.

Secretly Blatt worked with Queen Helen, helping her rescue Jewish families from concentration camps in the regions of Transylvania, Moldavia and Basarabia. He often informed the Queen about goings on that were unknown to her, and acted as liaison between the Queen and the Chief Rabbi of Romania, Alexandru Șafran, while making sure to avoid detection by the Antonescu government and the Nazis of the Queen's actions in protecting Jews during the Holocaust.

After King Michael I of Romania staged a coup against the Antonescu government in August 1944, Blatt evacuated his family to Sinaia, remaining in Bucharest himself to tend to the wounded. Until the end of the war he served as captain of a medical evacuation aircraft, flying wounded victims to specialist hospitals, while continuing to teach at the university and attend to his medical practice.

=== Post-war ===
After the war, Blatt held the positions of Professor head of Chair (1946–1953) and Head of the Clinic and Laboratories of the Department of Ophthalmology at the University Hospital of Timișoara, as well as the position of Professor and Chief of the Ophthalmology Department at the "Institute for Specialization and Perfecting of Physicians" in Bucharest. He continued to be the official ophthalmologist of the Romanian royal court, and retained his private practice in Bucharest. He commuted weekly by train between Timișoara and Bucharest.

In 1947 King Michael was forced to abdicate by the Petru Groza government. The royal family requested that the Blatt family be permitted to emigrate as part of their entourage, but the government refused, saying that the country needed Blatt's skills. He was permitted to retain his university positions, but the People's Republic closed all private medical practices and confiscated all medical equipment. Physicians were allowed to see patients only in government policlinics.

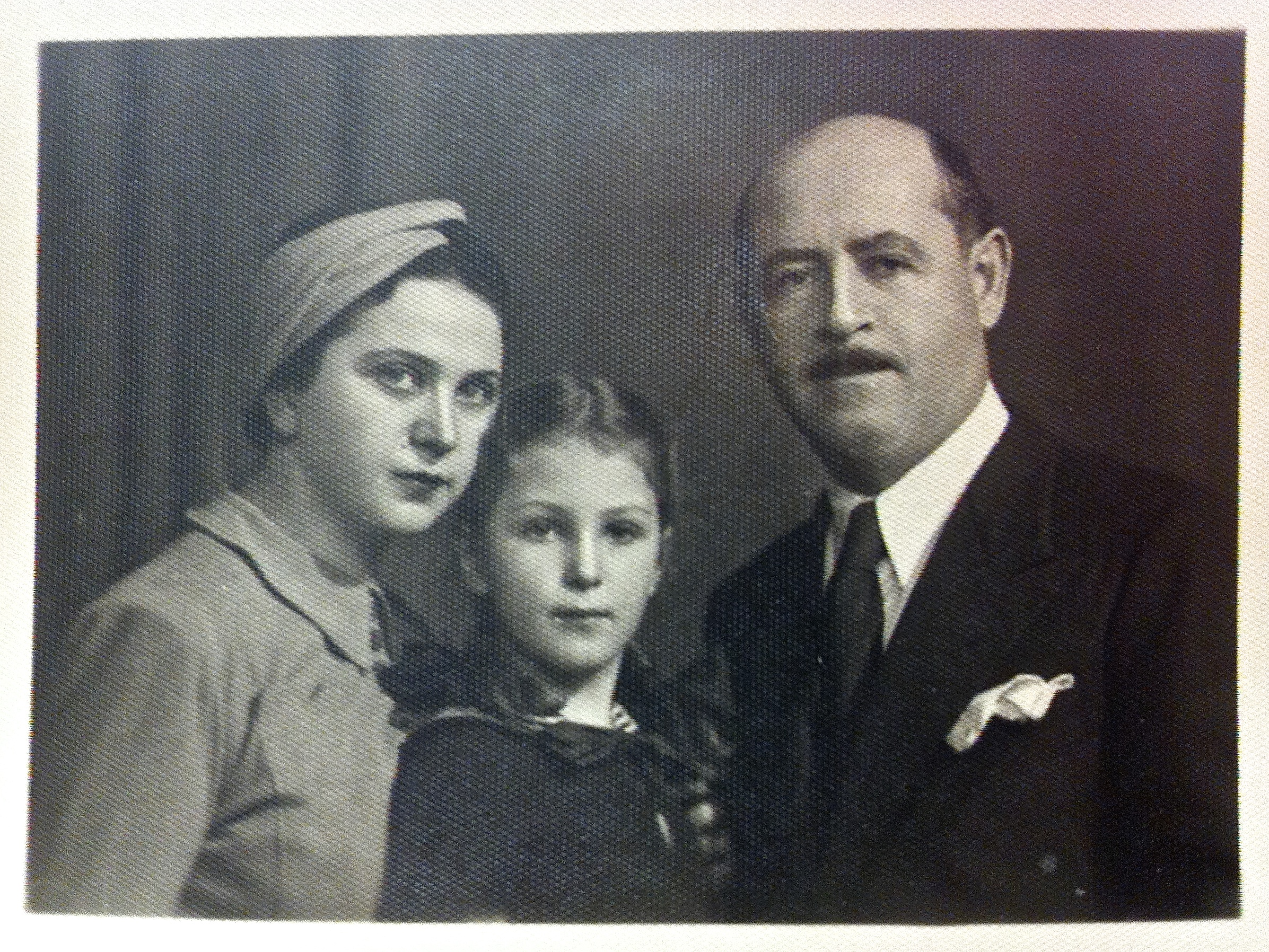
Nicolae Blatt with wife and daughter

=== Revista de Oftalmologie ===
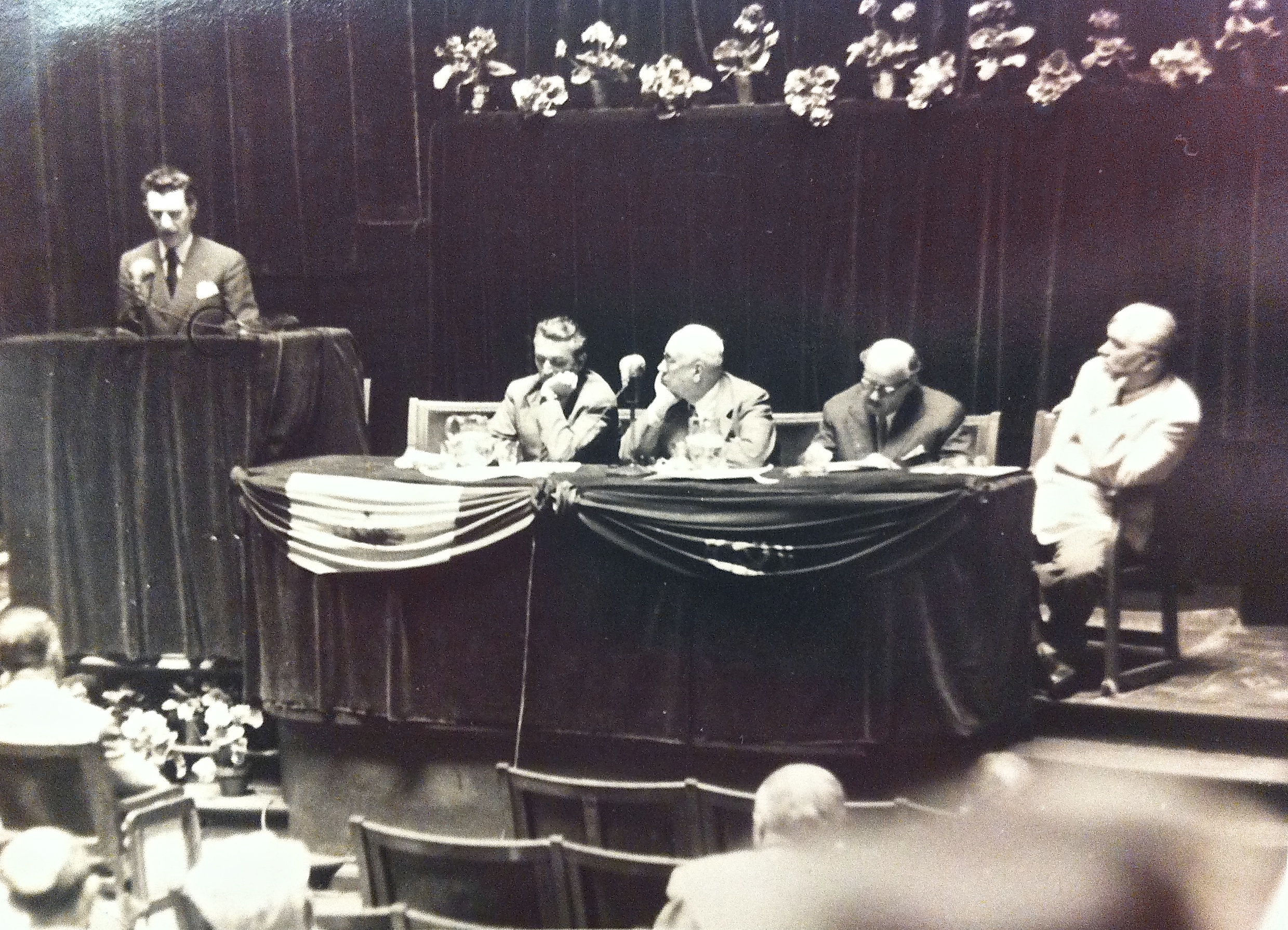
Blatt at Congress of Ophthalmology in Bucharest, late 1950s

In 1948 Blatt founded the first Romanian journal of ophthalmology, Revista de Oftalmologie, with the participation of many international ophthalmologists, including Filatov of Russia, Baillart and Jeandelize of France, Bietti of Italy, Busacca of Brazil, Cosmetatos of Greece, Franceschetti of Switzerland, Igersheimer and R. Gifford of the US, Pascheff of Bulgaria, Duke-Elder of the UK, and Weve from the Netherlands. The editorial secretaries were the Romanians Virgil Popovici, Nicolae Zolog and Ion Moisescu. The government suppressed the journal after the first issue and declared in the Revista Stiintelor Medicale that Blatt was a traitor to his country, an agent of Wall Street and an individual who "does not deserve to teach the new generations of upcoming Romanian physicians who must be devoted to the Soviet science, the only acceptable and real science, in the world".

After that Blatt was asked, and declined, to deliver a public statement of mea culpa stating that he was guilty of all the accusations. From then on Blatt and his family were subject to Securitate surveillance. In 1954 Blatt was removed from all his teaching responsibilities and was forbidden to see patients or to perform surgeries at the University Hospitals. He obtained the lesser position of Director of the Clinic of Ophthalmology in the Policlinica Cantacuzino.

In September 1958 he was invited to act as President of the 18th International Congress of Ophthalmology in Brussels, Belgium. The government refused to issue him a passport.

=== Request to leave Romania and imprisonment ===
At the end of 1958 Blatt and his family requested permission to leave Romania. Consequently, he and his wife Marta were imprisoned, and they were threatened and tortured to force them to confess their "criminal relations with the imperialist Occident". Among the crimes he was accused of were having relations with the royal court of Romania, being an agent of Wall Street and having opened bank accounts in Western Europe and in the US in the early 1930s. Blatt was forced to write to the banks asking that the money be returned, whereupon it was confiscated.

After contributions from Blatt ceased, the international ophthalmology societies of Western Europe began making inquiries. Eventually the Blatt family was released from jail, though Blatt was refused work by most medical institutions; he was hired as a practicing ophthalmologist by a small policlinic on the outskirts of Bucharest.

A group of European and American ophthalmologists headed by Professor Francesco Bietti of Italy then met at an international congress to discuss how to obtain the release of Blatt and his family from Romania. Ultimately his wife's sister in Toronto, Canada, paid the Romanian Government for their release, which happened in 1964.

=== Life in exile and death ===
The French Government granted the Blatt family a visa for an unlimited period, and they moved to Paris in August 1964. In October 1964, he was appointed Guest Professor of Ophthalmology, and given a research laboratory, at the Goethe University Frankfurt in West Germany.

After a short period of teaching and beginning some research projects, Blatt died aged 74 after a short illness on 10 April 1965, at the university hospital in Frankfurt.

Marta Blatt continued living in Frankfurt. She died seven years later, aged 67.

== Editorial committees ==
- Oftalmologia – Bucharest, Romania (1954).
- Excerpta Medica Ophthalmology – Amsterdam, the Netherlands.
- International Journal for Trachoma – Marseille, France.
- L'Ophtalmologica – Basle, Switzerland
- L'Aggiornimenti di Terapia Oftalmologica – Pisa, Italy.
- Rivista Italiana de Trachoma e di Patologia Oculare virale ed esotica – Catania, Italy.
- Ophthalmic Literature – London, England.
- Société Française d'Ophthalmologie – Paris, France.
- Deutsche Ophthalmologische Gesellschaft – Heidelberg, Germany.
- Wiener Ophtalmologische Gesellschaft – Vienna, Austria.
- Società Italiana Oftalmologica – Rome, Italy.
- Società Oftalmologica Lombarda – Milan, Italy.
- Revista de Oftalmologie – Bucharest, Romania.

== Selected publications ==
=== Articles ===
Blatt published 373 papers in several foreign ophthalmology journals, mostly based on his research. A number of these were republished as Cercetări şi studii in oftalmologie.

- Blatt, Nicolaus (28 July 1922). "Hebung der Kohlenhydrattoleranz und Verminderung der Glykosurie vor Staroperationen bei diabetischer Stoffwechselstörung". Albrecht von Graefes Archiv für Ophthalmologie (in German). 108 (3–4): 411–19. doi:10.1007/BF02140949. S2CID 32380760.
- Blatt, Nicolas (1922). "Kürettage der Bindehaut (abrasio conjunctivae) bei den chronisch-katarrhalischen Conjunctivitiden". Wiener Klinische Wochenschrift (in German). 52.
- Blatt, Nikolaus (31 March 1923). "Klinik und Pathologie des primären Lidanthrax". Albrecht von Graefes Archiv für Ophthalmologie (in German). 111 (1–2): 60–71. doi:10.1007/BF02096285. S2CID 43137861.
- Blatt, Nicholas (1931). "Weakness of Accommodation". Archives of Ophthalmology. 5 (3): 362–73. doi:10.1001/archopht.1931.00820030046005.
- Blatt, Nicholas (1932). "The Correction of High Myopia by Mueller's Contact Glasses". Archives of Ophthalmology. 7 (3): 399–417. doi:10.1001/archopht.1932.00820100053008.
- Blatt, N. (July 1949). "La valeur de la malaria-thérapie dans l'atrophie syphilitique des nerfs optiques". Annales d'oculistique (in French). 182: 513–20.
- Blatt, N.; Regenbogen, L. (1966). "Le Problème de la fixation eccentrique dans l'amblyopie strabique". Archives d'Ophtalmologie et Revue Générale d'Ophtalmologie (in French). 26 (2): 113–36.
- Blatt, Nikolaus (1965). "Intraoculare Knochenbildungen: Osseom und Ossifikation". Albrecht von Graefes Archiv für Klinische und Experimentelle Ophthalmologie (in German). 168 (2): 220–40. doi:10.1007/bf00411272. S2CID 45529227. (Postmortem)
- Blatt, Nikolaus (1965). "Augenhintergrundveränderungen bei hochgradiger Myopie". Klinische Monatsblätter für Augenheilkunde (in German). 146 (3): 391–411.
- Blatt, N. (1965). "Von isolierter Irisverletzung ausgehende sympatische Ophthalmie". In Jaeger, W. (ed.). Deutsche Ophthalmologische Gesellschaft, Bericht über die 66. Zusammenkunft in Heidelberg 1964 (PDF) (in German). Berlin: Springer. pp. 62–66. OCLC 660546114.

=== Books ===
- Blatt, Nicolae (1935). Cercetări şi studii in oftalmologie [Research and studies in Ophthalmology] (in Romanian). Bucharest: Tiparul Suprema. OCLC 18495910.
- Blatt, Nicolae (1947). La prophylaxie de la cécité en Roumanie (1940–1947) [The prophylaxis of blindness in Romania (1940–1947)] (in French). Bucharest: Imprimeria Natională.
- Blatt, Nicolae (1947). Înfiinţarea unui Institut Central de Oftalmologie [Establishment of a Central Institute of Ophthalmology] (in Romanian). Bucharest: Monitorul Oficial şi Imprimeriile Statului. Imprimeria Naţională. OCLC 895409163.
- Blatt, Nicolae (1948). Course for Ophthalmology for medical students (in Romanian). Timișoara.
- Blatt, Nicolae (1957). Textbook for Ophthalmology (for specialization and perfecting of physicians) (in Romanian). Vol. 2 vols. Bucharest.
