= Albert Szent-Györgyi Medical University =

University in Szeged

Coordinates: 46.24599°N 20.14895°E

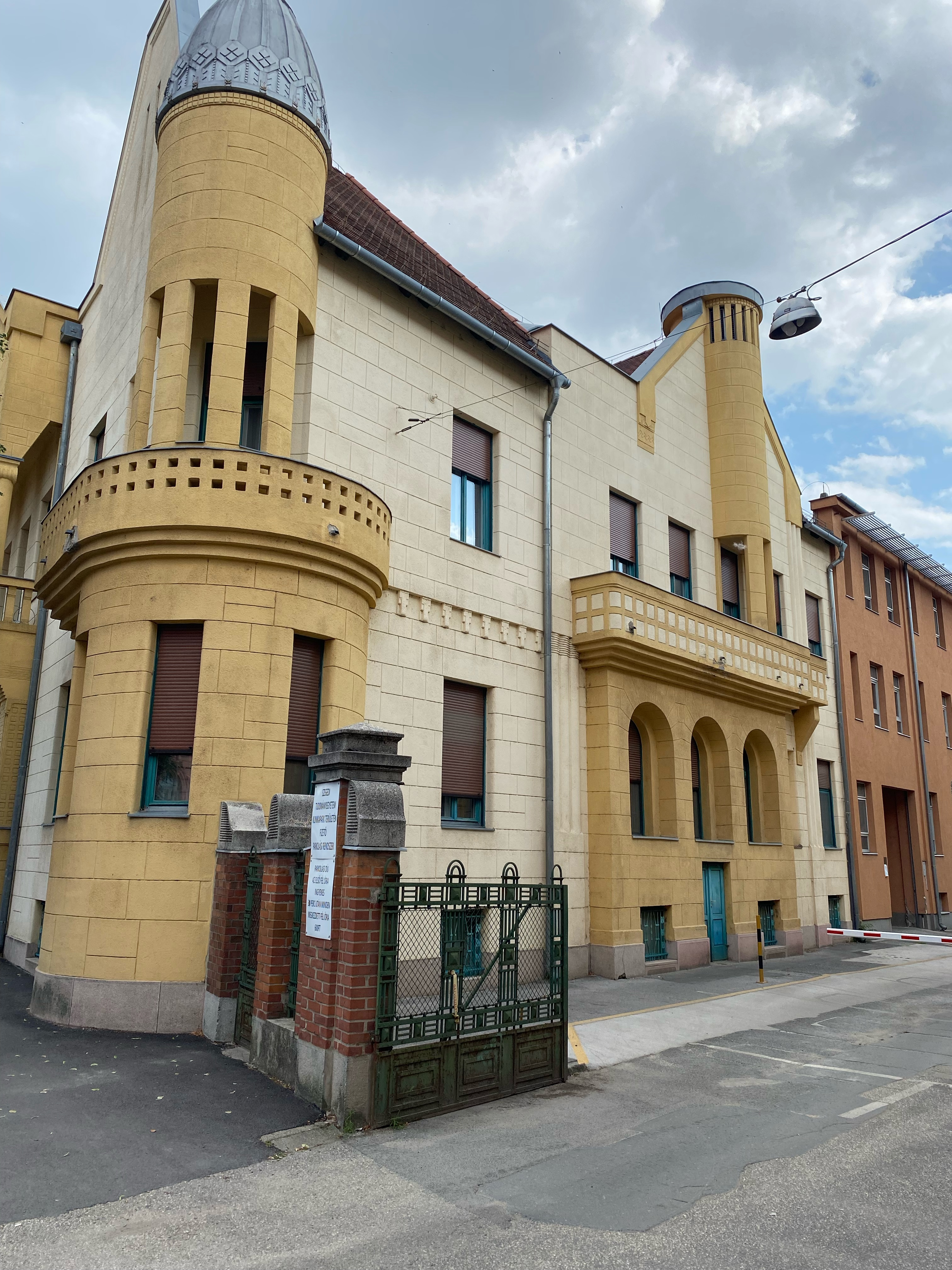
Side view of Albert Szent-Györgyi Medical University

Albert Szent-Györgyi Medical University was originally established in Kolozsvár, then in Austria-Hungary, later Romania, in 1872. After World War I, it was moved to Szeged. Since 1921 great advances have been made in the development of the University. Most of the University buildings have preserved their original, harmonized style, providing a true University atmosphere of tradition.

== Setting and architecture ==
Preclinical departments of the Faculty of Medicine are situated around Cathedral (Dóm) Square. The University Hospitals, housing the clinical departments, occupy the land between the Cathedral and River Tisza, which is a calm, peaceful area of the old town. Some of the preclinical departments are accommodated in other buildings; however, even off-campus departments of the Medical University (such as Anatomy and Forensic Medicine) are within easy access from the city center (10 minutes by tram).

== Notable professors ==
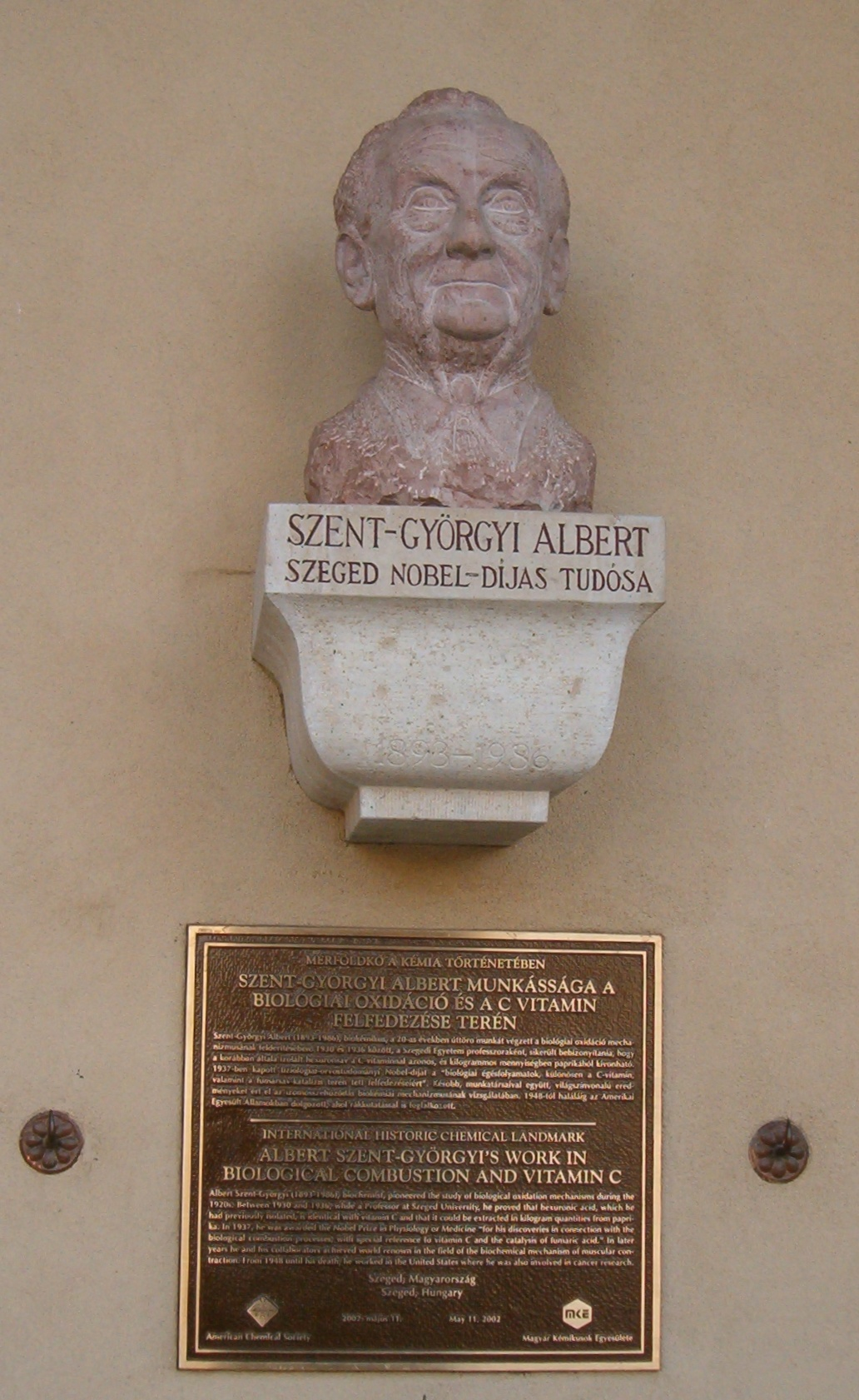
Albert Szent-Györgyi (1893-1986) Nobel Prize laureate biochemist

Many notable professors have been members of the faculty, including:

- József Mátyás Baló (pathology)
- Béla Issekutz and Nicholas (Miklós) Jancsó (pharmacology)
- Dezső Miskolczy (neurology)
- István Rusznyák and Géza Hetényi (internal medicine)
- György Ivanovics (microbiology)
- Albert Szent-Györgyi (medical chemistry); the university recently assumed his name. He was awarded the Nobel Prize in 1937 for his achievements in biochemistry.

== Notable researchers ==
Among other notable people, the following researchers have been honorary doctors of the university:

- S. Bonfils, Paris, France,
- Ludwig Demling, Erlangen-Nuremberg, Germany,
- Egon Diczfalusy, Stockholm, Sweden,
- Francis (Ferenc) Földes, New York, United States,
- Ryszard Jerzy Gryglewski, Kraków, Poland,
- Paul Janssen, Beerse, Belgium,
- Helmuth Kala, Halle, Germany,
- K. Kovács, Toronto, Ontario, Canada,
- E. Körber, Tübingen, Germany,
- W. Kreutzberg, Munich, Germany,
- J. M. Krueger, Pullman, USA,
- G. Lajtha, Manchester, England,
- M. McMahon, Leeds, England,
- Sh. Massry, Los Angeles, USA,
- J. Nakamura, Missoula, USA,
- P. Pflegel, Greifswald, Germany,
- P. Rakic, New Haven, USA,
- J. Roelandt, Rotterdam, The Netherlands,
- H. L. Sheehan, Liverpool, England,
- B. F. Straub, Budapest, Hungary,
- T. Symington, London, England,
- D. De Wied, Utrecht, The Netherlands,
- J. R. Wolff, Göttingen, Germany.

== Faculty of Pharmacy ==
The Faculty of Pharmacy was founded in 1957. Since 1921, more than 4000 pharmacists have received their diplomas (Master of Pharmacy) and 400 pharmacists have been awarded a university doctorate in pharmacy. In recent years, 94 foreign students from 24 countries have received pharmaceutical diplomas through government-sponsored exchange programs. A number of young foreign pharmacists currently take part in different post-graduate courses.

== Education today ==
The Albert Szent-Györgyi Medical University is the regional center of health care for southern Hungary, offering wide-ranging cooperation and collaboration with surrounding hospitals and research institutes. As stated earlier the once independent university is now a faculty of the University of Szeged.

== See also ==
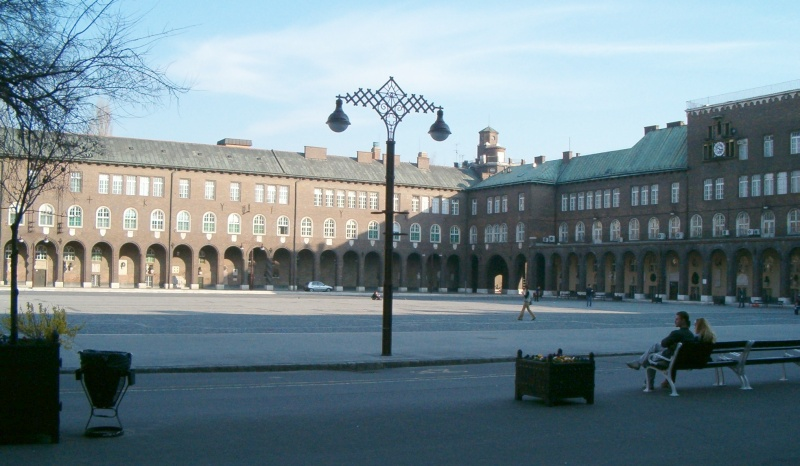
University of Szeged

- Albert Szent-Györgyi
