= List of Jewish ghettos in Europe during World War II =

List of ghettos in Nazi-occupied Europe
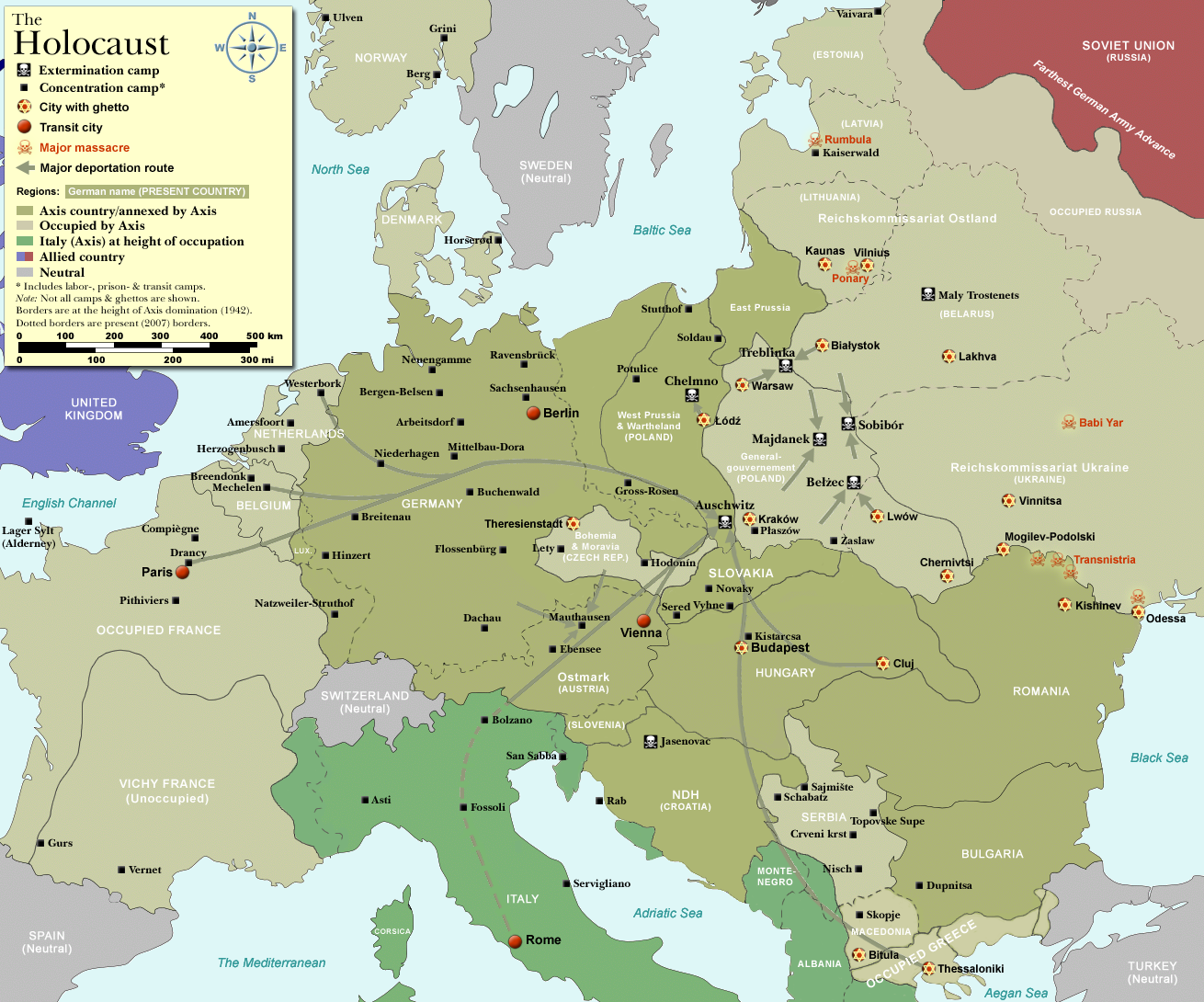
The World War II ghettos established by Nazi Germany in which Jews were confined existed across the continent; their inmates were later shipped to Nazi concentration camps

During World War II the Nazis created Jewish ghettos for the purpose of isolating, exploiting and finally eradicating Jewish population (and sometimes Romani people) on territories they controlled. Most of the ghettos were set up by the Third Reich in the course of World War II. In total, according to United States Holocaust Memorial Museum archives, "The Germans established at least 1,000 ghettos in German-occupied and annexed Poland and the Soviet Union alone." Therefore, the examples are intended only to illustrate their scope across Eastern and Western Europe.

== In Europe ==
Large Nazi ghettos in which Jews were confined existed across the continent. These ghettos were liquidated as Holocaust transports delivered their helpless victims to concentration and extermination camps built by Nazi Germany in occupied Poland.

=== German-occupied Poland ===
Following the 1939 invasion of Poland, the new ghetto system had been imposed by Nazi Germany roughly between October 1939 and July 1942 in order to confine Poland's Jewish population of 3.5 million for the purpose of persecution, terror, and exploitation. The Warsaw Ghetto was the largest ghetto in all of Nazi occupied Europe, with over 400,000 Jews crammed into an area of 3.4 square kilometres (1 3/8 square miles), or 7.2 persons per room. The Łódź Ghetto was the second largest, holding about 160,000 inmates.

A more complete list of over 270 ghettos with an approximate number of prisoners, dates of creation and liquidation, as well as known deportation routes to extermination camps, is available at Jewish ghettos in German-occupied Poland. Below, selected Nazi German designations are listed.

- Baranowicz Ghetto, today Belarus
- Będzin Ghetto, site of Będzin Ghetto Uprising
- Białystok Ghetto, site of Białystok Ghetto uprising
- Borshchiv Ghetto, today Ukraine
- Brześć (Brest-Litovsk) Ghetto, today Belarus
- Buczacz Ghetto, today Ukraine
- Brody Ghetto, today Ukraine
- Częstochowa Ghetto, site of Częstochowa Ghetto uprising
- Czortków Ghetto, today Ukraine
- Drohobycz Ghetto, today Ukraine
- Grodno Ghetto, today Belarus
- Izbica Ghetto
- Kielce Ghetto
- Kolomyja Ghetto, today Ukraine
- Kostopol Ghetto, today Ukraine
- Kraków (Krakau) Ghetto
- Łachwa Ghetto, site of Łachwa Ghetto uprising, today Belarus
- Lida Ghetto, today Belarus
- Łódź (Litzmannstadt) Ghetto
- Łomża Ghetto
- Lubartów Ghetto
- Lublin Ghetto
- Łuck Ghetto, site of Łuck Ghetto uprising and massacre, today Ukraine
- Lwów (Lemberg) Ghetto, site of Lviv pogroms, today Ukraine
- Marcinkance (Marcinkonys) Ghetto, today Lithuania
- Międzyrzec Podlaski (Mezritsh) Ghetto
- Mińsk Mazowiecki (Novominsk) Ghetto
- Mizocz Ghetto, today Ukraine
- Nowogródek (Navahrudak) Ghetto, today Belarus
- Nowy Sącz Ghetto (20 Jews assigned to one room)
- Olyka Ghetto
- Opatów Ghetto in Opatów
- Pińsk (Pinsk) Ghetto, today Belarus
- Piotrków Trybunalski (Petrikau) Ghetto
- Przemyśl Ghetto
- Radom Ghetto
- Rakaŭ Ghetto, today Belarus
- Równe Ghetto, today Ukraine
- Sambor Ghetto, see rescue by Franciscan Sisters of the Family of Mary, today Ukraine
- Siedlce Ghetto, see the November 1942 massacre at Gęsi Borek
- Słonim Ghetto, site of Słonim Ghetto uprising, today Belarus
- Sosnowiec (Sosnowitz) Ghetto, site of Sosnowiec Ghetto uprising
- Stanisławów (Stanislau) Ghetto, site of Bloody Sunday massacre, today Ukraine
- Stryj Ghetto, today Ukraine
- Tarnopol Ghetto with satellite labour camps, today Ukraine
- Tarnów Ghetto
- Trochenbrod (Zofiówka) Ghetto, today Ukraine
- Vilna (Wilno, Vilnius) Ghetto, site of Ponary massacre, today Lithuania
- Warsaw (Warschau) Ghetto, site of Warsaw Ghetto Uprising
- Zdzięcioł (Djatlowo) Ghetto, site of Dzyatlava massacre

=== Other countries and occupied territories ===
- Annopol Ghetto, Reichskommissariat Ukraine (now Ukraine)
- Bobruisk Ghetto, Military Administration in the Soviet Union (now Belarus)
- Baia Mare Ghetto, Hungary (now Romania)
- Borisov Ghetto, Reichskommissariat Ostland (now Belarus)
- Berdichev Ghetto, Reichskommissariat Ukraine (now Ukraine)
- Berezdov Ghetto, Reichskommissariat Ukraine (now Ukraine)
- Bershad (Berșad) Ghetto, Romania (now Ukraine)
- Bytom (Beuthen) Ghetto, pre-war Germany (now Poland)
- Bistrița Ghetto, Hungary (now Romania)
- Bobrynets Ghetto, Reichskommissariat Ukraine (now Ukraine)
- Budapest Ghetto, Hungary
- Cehei Ghetto, Hungary (now Romania)
- Cherkasy Ghetto, Reichskommissariat Ukraine (now Ukraine)
- Chernihiv Ghetto, Military Administration in the Soviet Union (now Ukraine)
- Chernivtsi (Cernăuți) Ghetto, Romania (now Ukraine)
- Cluj (Kolozsvár) Ghetto, Hungary (now Romania)
- Daugavpils (Dvinsk) Ghetto, Reichskommissariat Ostland (now Latvia)
- Debrecen Ghetto, Hungary
- Dej Ghetto, Hungary (now Romania)
- Donetsk Ghetto, Military Administration in the Soviet Union (now Ukraine)
- Feodosia Ghetto, Crimean General Government, Crimea
- Gomel Ghetto, Military Administration in the Soviet Union (now Belarus)
- Gorodok Ghetto, Military Administration in the Soviet Union (now Belarus)
- Kaluga Ghetto, Military Administration in the Soviet Union (now Russia)
- Kaposvár Ghetto, Hungary
- Karlovac Ghetto, Croatia
- Kovno (Kaunas) Ghetto, Reichskommissariat Ostland (now Lithuania)
- Kharkiv Ghetto, Military Administration in the Soviet Union (now Ukraine)
- Kherson Ghetto, Reichskommissariat Ukraine (now Ukraine)
- Kishinev Ghetto, Romania (now Chișinău, Moldova)
- Klimovo Ghetto, Military Administration in the Soviet Union (now Russia)
- Klimavichy Ghetto, Military Administration in the Soviet Union (now Belarus)
- Klintsy Ghetto, Military Administration in the Soviet Union (now Russia)
- Kobeliaky Ghetto, Reichskommissariat Ukraine (now Ukraine)
- Košice Ghetto, Hungary (now Slovakia)
- Liepāja Ghetto, Reichskommissariat Ostland (now Latvia)
- Lyakhavichy Ghetto, Lyakhavichy (now in Belarus)
- Mátészalka Ghetto, Hungary
- Mazyr Ghetto, Reichskommissariat Ukraine (now Belarus)
- Minsk Ghetto, Reichskommissariat Ostland (now Belarus)
- Miskolc Ghetto, Hungary
- Mogilev Ghetto, Military Administration in the Soviet Union (now Belarus)
- Mohyliv-Podilskyi (Moghilău) Ghetto, Romania (now Ukraine)
- Monastir Ghetto, Bulgaria (now North Macedonia)
- Munkács Ghetto, Hungary (now Ukraine)
- Nyíregyháza Ghetto, Hungary
- Odesa Ghetto, Romania (now Ukraine)
- Oleksandrivka Ghetto, Reichskommissariat Ukraine (now Ukraine), first liquidation in March 1942 was where the Ivanhorod Einsatzgruppen photograph was taken.
- Olyka Ghetto, Reichskommissariat Ukraine (now Ukraine)
- Oradea Ghetto, Hungary (now Romania)
- Orsha Ghetto, Reichskommissariat Ukraine (now Belarus)
- Pochep Ghetto, Military Administration in the Soviet Union (now Russia)
- Polotsk Ghetto, Military Administration in the Soviet Union (now Belarus)
- Proskurov Ghetto, Reichskommissariat Ukraine (now Ukraine)
- Pruzhany Ghetto, Reichskommissariat Ostland (now Belarus)
- Pryluky Ghetto, Military Administration in the Soviet Union (now Ukraine)
- Pskov Ghetto, Military Administration in the Soviet Union (now Russia)
- Reghin Ghetto, Hungary (now Romania)
- Riga Ghetto, Reichskommissariat Ostland (now Latvia)
- Salonika Ghetto, German occupation zone in Greece (now Greece)
- Satu Mare Ghetto, Hungary (now Romania)
- Sfântu Gheorghe Ghetto Hungary, (now Romania)
- Shepetivka Ghetto, Reichskommissariat Ukraine (now Ukraine)
- Shumyachi Ghetto, Military Administration in the Soviet Union (now Russia)
- Šiauliai Ghetto, Reichskommissariat Ostland (now Lithuania)
- Sighet Ghetto, Hungary (now Romania)
- Skvyra Ghetto, Reichskommissariat Ukraine (now Ukraine)
- Slavuta Ghetto, Reichskommissariat Ukraine (now Ukraine)
- Slutsk Ghetto, Reichskommissariat Ostland (now Belarus)
- Smolensk Ghetto, Military Administration in the Soviet Union (now Russia)
- Snovsk Ghetto, Military Administration in the Soviet Union (now Ukraine)
- Starodub Ghetto, Military Administration in the Soviet Union (now Russia)
- Stolin Ghetto, Reichskommissariat Ostland (now Belarus)
- Švenčionys Ghetto, Reichskommissariat Ostland (now Lithuania)
- Svislach Ghetto, Reichskommissariat Ostland (now Belarus)
- Szeged Ghetto, Hungary
- Székesfehérvár Ghetto, Hungary
- Szombathely Ghetto, Hungary
- Tarashcha Ghetto, Reichskommissariat Ukraine (now Ukraine)
- Telšiai Ghetto, Reichskommissariat Ostland (now Lithuania)
- Theresienstadt Ghetto (concentration camp, sometimes referred to as a ghetto), Protectorate of Bohemia and Moravia (now Czech Republic)
- Uman Ghetto, Reichskommissariat Ukraine (now Ukraine)
- Uzhgorod Ghetto, Hungary (now Ukraine)
- Vinnytsia Ghetto, Reichskommissariat Ukraine (now Ukraine)
- Vitebsk Ghetto, Military Administration in the Soviet Union (now Belarus)
- Žagarė Ghetto, Reichskommissariat Ostland (now Lithuania)
- Zagreb Ghetto, Croatia
- Yevpatoria Ghetto, Crimean General Government (now Russia)
- Zhitomir Ghetto, Reichskommissariat Ukraine (now Ukraine)
- Zlatopil Ghetto, Reichskommissariat Ukraine (now Ukraine)
- Zlynka Ghetto, Military Administration in the Soviet Union (now Russia)
- Zvenyhorodka Ghetto, Reichskommissariat Ukraine (now Ukraine)

== Ghettos outside Europe ==
- Shanghai Ghetto (1937-1941, less restriction over Jews by Japanese) (1941-1945) Japanese forced 16,000 Jews into a one square mile ghetto, where they were often the victims of air raids by the U.S.' 7th Air Force, and often had no running water, no bathroom, heavy rations, and it was not uncommon for 30-40 people to sleep in the same room.

== Bibliography ==
- Megargee, Geoffrey P., ed. (2012). Encyclopedia of Camps and Ghettos, 1933–1945. in association with United States Holocaust Memorial Museum. Bloomington: Indiana University Press. ISBN 978-0253355997.
- Spector, Shmuel; Wigoder, Geoffrey, eds. (2001). The Encyclopedia of Jewish Life Before and During the Holocaust. New York: New York University Press. ISBN 978-0814793565.
