= Romanianization =

Adoption of Romanian culture and language by non-Romanian people

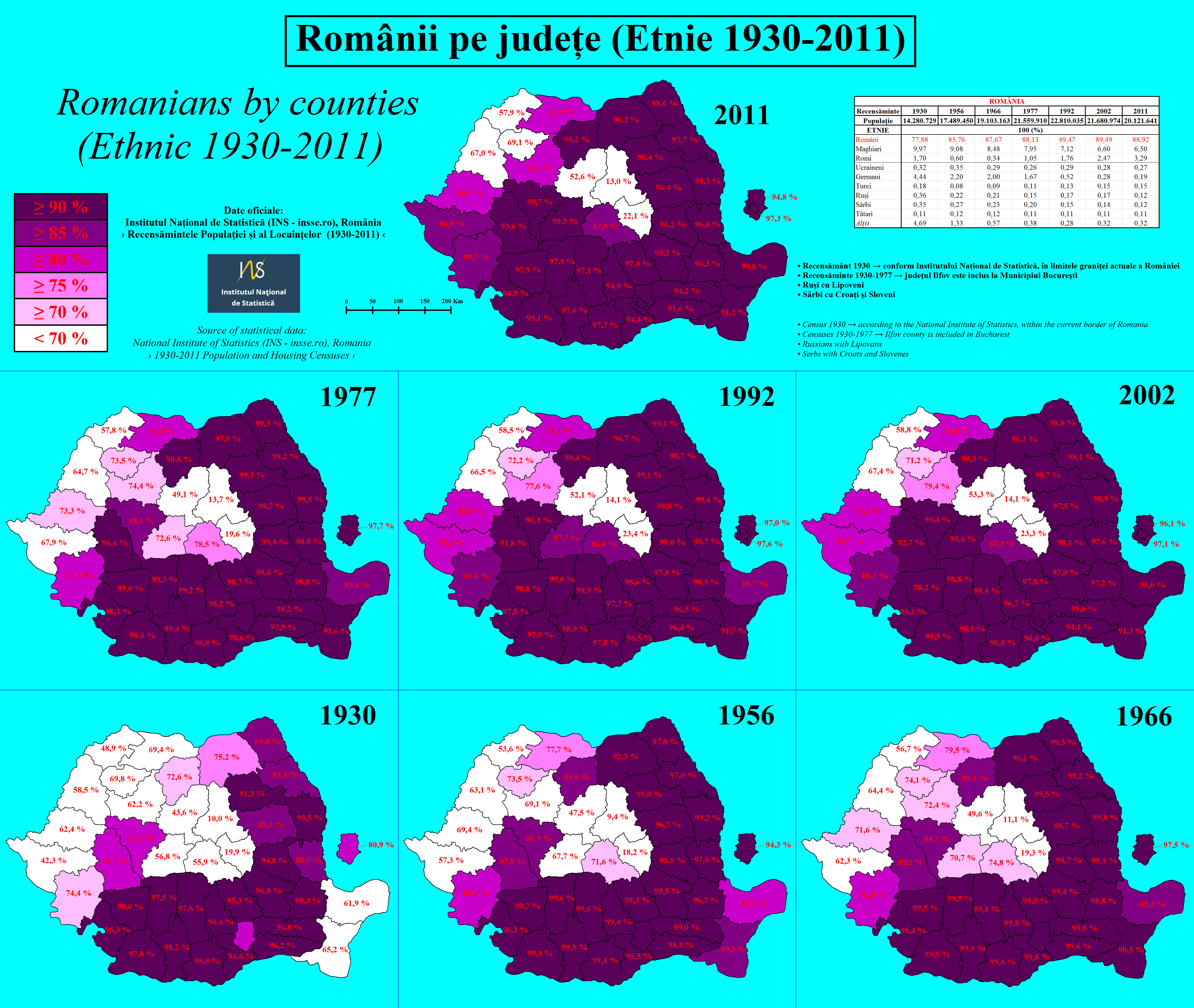
Romanians in Romania by counties (Ethnic maps 1930–2011)

Romanianization is the series of policies aimed toward ethnic assimilation implemented by the Romanian authorities during the 20th and 21st century. The most noteworthy policies were those aimed at the Hungarian minority in Romania, Jews and as well the Ukrainian minority in Bukovina and Bessarabia.

== Romanianization in Transylvania ==
=== Interbellum ===
After the end of World War I, on 1 December 1918, the Romanian National Council (elected representatives of the Romanian population) and soon afterwards, the representatives of the German population had decided to unify with Romania. The decision was contested by the Hungarian minority. The Hungarian–Romanian War of 1918–1919 established Romanian control over Transylvania, while the Treaty of Trianon of 1920 determined the Romanian border with the new Hungarian state. However, Transylvania had a large Hungarian minority of 39%, according to the 1910 census. A portion of them fled to Hungary after the union; however, most of them remained in Romania, and by the 1930s, their number increased to 26.7% of the whole Transylvanian population. The increase in the proportion of the Hungarian minority in Transylvania was induced by the immigration of the Hungarians from Hungary and by the significant improvement of living standards of the Hungarian minority in Romania compared with those of the interwar Hungarian population. While Romania included large national minorities, the 1923 Constitution declared the country to be a nation-state, following the French model which was popular in many European nations at that time.

After the dissolution of Austria-Hungary, the post-war mass actions undertaken by the Romanian authorities were primarily directed against the Hungarian aristocracy and, at times, the Jews. The takeover did not happen without impacting the cultural and economic life of the Hungarians. While, in accordance with the Agricultural Act of 1921, a number of Hungarian estates and lands were confiscated, the land reform openly favored the Romanians, the national group which used to be the victims of the unjust land allocation systems in place during Hungarian rule.

Although Romania won the war, the anti-Hungarian sentiments were not remitted. During the 1930s, in response to Hungarian irredentism, anti-revisionist demonstrations began in Romania, supported by Nationalist newspapers like Universul. After a particularly violent protest in Cluj, Foreign Minister Nicolae Titulescu officially condemned the events in Bucharest newspapers.

In August 1940, during World War II, Northern Transylvania was annexed by Hungary as a result of the Second Vienna Award, leaving Southern Transylvania to Romania. After the coup d'état of 23 August 1944, Romania left the Axis and joined the Allies, and, as such, fought together with the Soviet Union's Red Army against Nazi Germany and Hungary, regaining Northern Transylvania. During the fall of 1944, after the withdrawal of the Hungarian military forces and administration from Transylvania, the Székely Land was engaged and pillaged by the Romanian Gendarmerie and volunteers. However, on 12 November 1944, the Soviets expelled the returning Romanian authorities from Northern Transylvania with reference to the massacres committed by members of Iuliu Maniu's so-called Maniu Guard, and the Romanian administration was not allowed to return until the communist-led government of Petru Groza was formed on 6 March 1945. The Hungarian-Romanian conflicts in 1940 and 1944 are still controversial.

=== After the Second World War ===
From 1947, the Romanian authorities gradually eliminated the wartime Hungarian institutions, after the Treaty of Trianon borders had been restored at the Paris Peace Treaties of 1947. However, Hungary was a Communist country as well; after the Hungarian Revolution of 1956, Hungarians in Transylvania were often accused of separatism and revisionism, and the majority of Hungarian intellectual and spiritual leaders, including Catholic bishop Áron Márton, were arrested and imprisoned for years. On the other hand, during the Communist era, the former civil organization possibilities of the interwar period were eliminated.

After 1948, the industrialization of towns doubled or even tripled the number of inhabitants in some urban areas, most of the newcomers being ethnic Romanians from the rural areas. The urbanization policy, a natural phenomenon tied to economic development and the intention of transforming a predominantly agrarian country into an industrialized one, was followed throughout Romania, including in areas inhabited by minorities.

By the late 1950s, the regime of Gheorghe Gheorghiu-Dej increasingly manipulated Romanian nationalism as a popular legitimizing device, applying more repressive policies toward the Hungarian minority. After the Hungarian Revolution of 1956, the Magyar Autonomous Region was dissolved and most key posts were filled by loyal Romanians.

In 1959, the Hungarian university in Cluj was merged with the Romanian one to become Babeș-Bolyai University, an almost exclusively Romanian-language institution. The event was marked by the suicide of several Hungarian professors. The Romanianization of education had begun earlier, in 1958, with the forced merger of Magyar primary schools with Romanian ones. The Csángós, for their part, lost their last Hungarian school in 1958.

After Nicolae Ceaușescu came to power in 1965, the assimilationist drive was pursued with new vigor. The remaining minority "privileges" were lost; Hungarian representation in the local bureaucracies was limited to the proportion of Hungarians in the total population. Mass resettlement of Romanians into Transylvania took place. Hungarian intellectuals were coerced into leaving Transylvania and were compelled to take jobs in non-Hungarian areas which also contributed to Romanianization.

=== Results ===
According to census data, the Hungarian population of Transylvania decreased from 25.5% in 1920 to 19.6% in 2002. Changes were more significant in cities/larger settlements where Hungarians used to be the majority, especially in Northern Transylvanian cities such as Oradea and Cluj-Napoca.

Romanianization of the Transylvanian population was also affected by the fact that 300,000 Germans emigrated to West Germany. The West German state paid Romania the equivalent of US$2,632 per ethnic German emigrant, as of 1983. Also, about 50,000 Jews who survived the Holocaust emigrated to Israel on similar terms. These mass emigrations were, however, an example of positive discrimination towards the German and Jewish populations, as the rest of the Transylvanian population (Romanians, Hungarians, Romas) had no opportunity to take part in this economically-driven emigration.

Romanianization was less sustained in the compact Székely areas of south-eastern Transylvania (the Székely Land), where in 2002, Hungarians made up around 61% of the population. The capital city of the former Magyar Autonomous Region (covering mostly the Székely areas) is an exception: the percentage of Hungarians in Târgu Mureş decreased to 46%, as the industrialization of the city led many people from the surrounding rural areas (largely Romanian) to move into the city.

=== Recent events ===
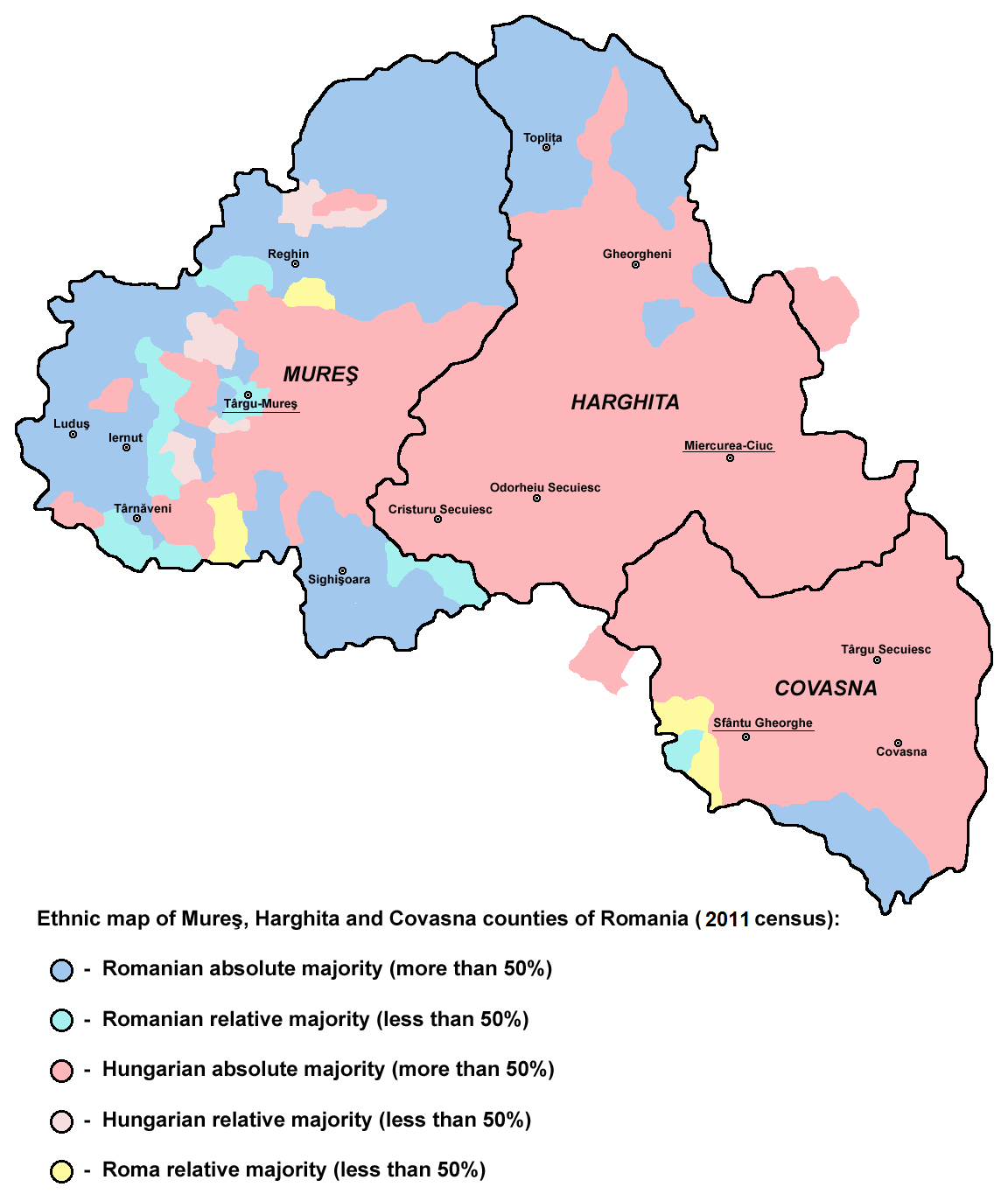
Ethnic map of Harghita, Covasna, and Mureș Counties based on the 2011 data, showing localities with Hungarian majority or plurality.

In the aftermath of the Romanian Revolution of 1989, ethnic-based political parties were constituted by both the Hungarians, who founded the Democratic Union of Hungarians in Romania, and by the Romanian Transylvanians, who founded the Romanian National Unity Party. Ethnic conflicts, however, never occurred on a significant scale, even though some violent clashes, such as the Târgu Mureș events of March 1990, did take place shortly after the fall of the Ceaușescu regime.

In 1995, a basic treaty on the relations between Hungary and Romania was signed. In the treaty, Hungary renounced all territorial claims to Transylvania, and Romania reiterated its respect for the rights of its minorities. Relations between the two countries improved as Romania and Hungary became members of the European Union in the 2000s.

The Democratic Union of Hungarians in Romania (UDMR) is the major representative of Hungarians in Romania, and is a member of the Unrepresented Nations and Peoples Organization. The aim of the UDMR is to achieve local government, cultural and territorial autonomy and the right to self-determination for Hungarians. UDMR is a member of the European Democrat Union (EDU) and the European People's Party (EPP). Since 1996, the UDMR has been a member or supporter of every governmental coalition.

Political agreements have brought the gradual implementation of Hungarian in everyday life: Public Administration Law 215/2002 stipulates "the use of national minority languages in public administration in settlements where minorities exceed 20% of the population"; minority ethnics will receive a copy of the documents in Romanian and a translation in their language; however, official documents are preserved by the local administration in Romanian only; local administration will provide inscriptions for the names of localities and public institutions under their authority, and display public interest announcements in the native language of the citizens of the respective ethnic minority under the same 20% rule.

Even though Romania co-signed the European laws for protecting minorities' rights, the implementation has not proved satisfactory to all members of the Hungarian community. There is a movement by Hungarians both for an increase in autonomy and distinct cultural development. Initiatives proposed by various Hungarian political organizations include the creation of an "autonomous region" in the counties that form the Székely region (Székelyföld), roughly corresponding to the territory of the former Magyar Autonomous Region, as well as the historical Székely Land that had been abolished by the Hungarian government in the second half of the 19th century, and the re-establishment of an independent state-funded Hungarian-language university.

However, the situation of the Hungarian minority in Romania has been seen as a model of cultural and ethnic diversity in the Balkan area: In an address to the American people, President Bill Clinton asked in the midst of the air war in Kosovo: Who is going to define the future of this part the world... Slobodan Milošević, with his propaganda machine and paramilitary forces which compel people to give up their country, identity, and property, or a state like Romania which has built a democracy respecting the rights of ethnic minorities?

The process is, with a lower intensity, active even today, irrespective of the political affiliation of the current government, partly because each party uses the ethnic minorities as scapegoats for their own electoral benefit. The measures include:

- punishment of public use of the Hungarian national symbols of the Hungarian minority,
- stigmatization of minority organisations by the press and government officials as enemies of the state,
- withdrawal of state decorations from people publicly talking about minority rights abuses of the Romanian state.

== Policies toward the Ukrainian minority in Romania ==
The territories of Bukovina (today split between Romania and Ukraine) and Bessarabia (today by 2/3 in the republic of Moldova and 1/3 in Ukraine), were historically populated by Romanians and Ukrainians for hundreds of years.

In 1775, Bukovina was annexed by the Habsburg monarchy, which offered certain currency in the public life for the two nations, however the general policy on churches and education disfavored the Christian Orthodox population. Austrian control favored immigration to develop the economy of the region. Due to Bukovina being administratively linked to the province of Galicia, the ethnic composition of the province was altered by waves of Ruthenian (Ukrainian), German and Jewish immigrants. According to Keith Hitchins, "In 1774 the estimated population was 75,000; in 1810 it was 198,000, and in 1848 378,000. The changes in the province's ethnic composition were dramatic. In 1774 the Romanians constituted an overwhelming majority, roughly 64,000 to 8,000 Ruthenians (Ukrainians) and 3,000 others. By 1810 the Romanian share had fallen from 85 per cent to 75 per cent (150,000 to 48,000 non-Romanians), and in 1848 there were 209,000 Romanians (55 per cent), 109,000 Ukrainians (29 per cent) and 60,000 others (16 per cent). The Jewish population rose from 526 in 1774 to 11,600 in 1848."

In 1918, following the collapse of Austria-Hungary, control over the whole of Bukovina fell under the Kingdom of Romania; same situation happens in Bessarabia after the relinquishment of Russian Empire. The takeover was followed by the policy of Romanianization of ethnic minorities, mostly Ukrainians, pursued by the Romanian authorities. The policies were built on an increasing sentiment spread in Romanian media and historic works that all of Bukovina was inherently a Romanian ethnic territory. Ion Nistor, a prominent Romanian historian and one of the most vocal proponents of Greater Romanian nationalism, was made a rector of the University of Cernăuţi (Chernivtsi), the main university of the province. Enrollment of Ukrainians in the university fell from 239 out of 1671 in 1914 to 155 out of 3,247 in 1933, while Romanian enrollment in the same period increased to 2,117 out of 3,247.

The Romanianization policies brought the closure of the Ukrainian public schools (all such schools were closed until 1928) and the suppression of most of the Ukrainian (Ruthenian) cultural institutions. The very term "Ukrainians" was prohibited from the official usage and some populations of disputable Ukrainian ethnicity were rather called the "citizens of Romania who forgot their native language" and were forced to change their last names to Romanian-sounding ones. Among those who were Romanianized were descendants of Romanians who were assimilated to Ukrainian society in the past. As such, according to the Romanian census, of the total population of 805,000, 74% were called Romanians; the number included the Ukrainians and other possibly related Ukrainian ethnic groups Hutsuls referred to as "Romanians who forgot their native language"

According to the 1930 census, Ukrainians made up 3.2% of the population of Romania. The declines in Ukrainian population between the censuses of 1919 and 1930 is illustrated as follows: the first census indicates a population of 16,250,000, of which 763,750 (4.7%) were Ukrainians; in 1930, as the total population had increased by 11% (to 18,025,896), the Ukrainian community had dropped to 576,828 members (75.5% of the previous total).

== See also ==
- Bukovina
  - Chernivtsi Oblast
- Dacianism
- Gagauz people
- Hungarians in Romania
- Magyarization
- Moldovenism
- Romani people in Romania
- Szeklers/Székelys
- Russification
- Ukrainization
