= Bistrița ghetto =

The Bistrița ghetto was one of the Nazi-era ghettos for European Jews during World War II. It was located outside the city of Beszterce, Beszterce-Naszód County, Kingdom of Hungary (now Bistrița, Bistrița-Năsăud County, Romania) as the territory became part of Hungary from the 1940 Second Vienna Award's grant of Northern Transylvania until late the end of World War II. It was active in the spring of 1944, following Operation Margarethe.

== History ==
The ghetto was set up on the Stamboli farm some 5 km outside Beszterce (Bistrița); some 6,000 Jews from the city and its surrounding communities were crammed onto the farm. Nearly 2,500 of them came from the city itself, with the rest being brought from the upper and lower districts, as well from the districts of Naszód and Óradna.

Ghettoization was ordered by Norbert Kuales, mayor of Beszterce (Bistrița) and his chief of police, Miklós Debreczeni. In other parts of the county, the operation was carried out by László Smolenszki, assistant to the ispán of the county and gendarmerie lieutenant-colonel Ernő Pasztai. Together with Adolf Eichmann's assistant, László Endre, the four had taken part in a planning conference at Marosvásárhely (Târgu Mureș) on April 28. Kuales stole valuable objects from detainees, taking them with him when he resigned as mayor and left for Germany that summer.

The ghetto was inadequate for basic needs, with residents housed in barracks or pigsties. One Heinrich Smolka was tasked with supplying water and food, which for the most part he did very poorly. Among those who persecuted Jews alongside Smolka was Gusztáv Órendi, a Gestapo agent from Beszterce (Bistrița). Local police forces guarded the ghetto with 25 gendarmes from Nagydemeter (Dumitra), sent there by colonel Paksy-Kiss. Kálmán Borbély became ispán of the county on May 10. In two transports, on June 2 (3,106) and June 6 (2,875), 5,981 Jews of Beszterce (Bistrița) were deported to the Auschwitz concentration camp.
