= Dej ghetto =

The Dej ghetto was one of the Nazi-era ghettos for European Jews during World War II. It was located in the city of Dej (Hungarian: Dés) in Cluj County, Transylvania, now part of Romania but administered as part of Szolnok-Doboka County by the Kingdom of Hungary from the 1940 Second Vienna Award's grant of Northern Transylvania until late 1944. The ghetto was active in the spring of 1944, following Operation Margarethe.

== History ==
The ghetto included most of the Jews from Szolnok-Doboka, corresponding to the pre-war Someș County. Prefect Béla Bethlen was the county's administrative chief, and at the ghettoization planning conference in Satu Mare on April 26, attended by Adolf Eichmann's assistant László Endre, local representatives included: János Schilling, assistant to the prefect; Jenő Veress, mayor of Dej; Lajos Tamási, mayor of Gherla; Gyula Sárosi, chief of police in Dej; Ernő Berecki, his counterpart in Gherla; and Pál Antalffy, commander of the county's gendarmerie. On April 30, in a special meeting called and chaired by Schilling, the goals and decisions of this conference were imparted to the heads of the county's civil service, gendarmerie and police.

As elsewhere, the ghettoization process started on May 3, led by Antalffy. The ghetto was among the region's most wretched, being located in the Bungur forest some 3 km from the city center, at the insistence of virulently anti-Semitic local officials. At its peak, there were 7,800 inhabitants, including the 3,700 Jews from Dej. The remainder came from the county's rural communities, with many of them initially assembled in the district seats of Beclean, Chiochiș, Dej, Gherla, Ileanda and Lăpuș. The most fortunate ghetto residents sheltered in improvised barracks, while the rest either made their own tents or stayed under the open sky. Prior to being taken to Bungur, the city's Jews were taken to three areas in the city center, where they were searched bodily for valuables.

Surrounded by barbed wire, the ghetto was guarded by local police, who were aided by a special unit of forty gendarmes brought from Zalău. The camp commanders were József Gecse and Emil Takács; they prevented the non-Jews from Dej and nearby areas from bringing food to the detainees. Internal administration was managed by a Judenrat composed of respected leaders of the local community. Lázár Albert was its president, and other members included Ferenc Ordentlich, Samu Weinberger, Manó Weinberger and Andor Agai. Dr. Oszkár Engelberg provided medical care, while Zoltán Singer was the economic representative in charge of provisions.

Sanitary conditions were lamentable, likewise basic services and provisions. This situation was largely due to ill will from Mayor Veress and the city's chief doctor, Zsigmond Lehnár. The teams that searched for valuables were as cruel as elsewhere. Among the searchers were József Fekete, József Gecse, Mária Fekete, Jenő Takács, József Lakadár and the policemen Albert (Béla) Garamvölgyi, János Somorlyai, János Kassai and Miklós Désaknai. Due to the poor conditions in which the Jews were held in the Dej ghetto, 25 people died and many became seriously ill.

The ghetto was liquidated in three transports: 28 May (3,150), 6 June (3,160) and 8 June (1,364), with a total of 7,674 Jews sent to the Auschwitz concentration camp. A few Jews managed to escape, including Rabbi József Paneth of Ileanda, who, together with nine family members, reached safety in Romania.
