= Sfântu Gheorghe ghetto =

The Sfântu Gheorghe ghetto was one of the Nazi-era ghettos for European Jews during World War II. It was located in the city of Sfântu Gheorghe (Hungarian: Sepsiszentgyörgy) in today's Covasna County, Transylvania, now part of Romania but administered by the Kingdom of Hungary from the 1940 Second Vienna Award's grant of Northern Transylvania until late 1944. It was active in the spring of 1944, following Operation Margarethe.

== History ==
The ghetto housed Jews from the city as well as from surrounding villages in Háromszék County (Trei Scaune), and from the southern part of Csík County (Ciuc). Its total population was 850. The committee for deciding on its location was composed of county prefect Gábor Szentiványi, whose conduct toward the rural Jews was relatively humane; his assistant Andor Barabás; the Sfântu Gheorghe chief of police, István Vincze; and lieutenant-colonel Balla, commander of the county's gendarmerie. Together with Adolf Eichmann's assistant László Endre, they had all taken part in a planning conference at Târgu Mureș.

The ghettoization procedure for the Jews of Sfântu Gheorghe unfolded differently from other areas. On May 2, the police asked them to come to their headquarters at 6 am the following day, together with all their family members. One member of each family was allowed to return home, accompanied by a policeman, in order to pick up essential possessions allowed by officials. Subsequently, the Jews were transferred to an unfinished building without doors or windows.

The Ciuc Jews, including those from Miercurea Ciuc, were rounded up under orders from county prefect Ernő Gaáli; his assistant József Abraham; Miercurea Ciuc mayor Gerő Szász; his chief of police, Pál Farkas; and the city's gendarmerie commander, locotenent-colonel Tivadar Lóhr. These individuals too had taken part in the Târgu Mureș conference. The ghetto was commanded by an unidentified SS officer, and conditions were harsh. After one week, residents were transported to the Reghin ghetto.
