= Satu Mare ghetto =

The Satu Mare ghetto was one of the Nazi-era ghettos for European Jews during World War II. It was located in the city of Satu Mare (Hungarian: Szatmárnémeti) in Satu Mare County, Transylvania, now part of Romania, but administered as part of Szatmár County by the Kingdom of Hungary from the 1940 Second Vienna Award's grant of Northern Transylvania until late 1944. The ghetto was active in the spring of 1944, following Operation Margarethe.

== History ==
Due to the relatively high number of Jews in the county, including the Satmar Hasidic dynasty, Hungarian authorities set up two ghettos - one in Satu Mare, and one in Baia Mare. Carei was initially also a ghetto site for the Jews of that city and its surroundings. However, after a short period, the inhabitants, led by a Judenrat composed of István Antal, Jenő Pfefferman, Ernő Deutsch, and Lajos Jakobovics, were transferred to Satu Mare.

On April 26, a regional ghettoization conference took place at Satu Mare; there, the county's representatives included László Csóka, mayor of Satu Mare; Endre Boér, assistant to the county prefect; Zoltán Rogozi Papp, assistant to Csóka; Ernő Pirkler, the city's secretary general; and members of the police and gendarmerie. Shortly after the conference, a meeting set up committees for arresting Jews in the city and its surroundings. The meeting was chaired by Csóka, and attended by Károly Csegezi, Béla Sárközi, and Jenő Nagy of the police, and N. Deményi of the gendarmerie. Additionally, members of the finance and education committees of Satu Mare took part in the committee work. Within the city, Csóka administered the ghettoization, while Boér handled the rest of the county.

At its peak, there were some 18,000 residents in the ghetto. They had been rounded up from the following districts: Ardud, Baia Mare, Carei, Copalnic-Mănăștur, Csenger, Fehérgyarmat, Mátészalka, Orașu Nou, Satu Mare, Șomcuta Mare, and Seini. Sárközi, the policeman in charge of the National Central Alien Control Office's local branch, commanded the ghetto. The Judenrat was headed by Zoltán Schwartz, and included Jewish community head Samuel Rosenberg, Singer, Lajos Vinkler, and József Borgida, all highly respected figures among the city's Jews.

The search for valuables was undertaken with the usual level of cruelty by Sárközi, Csegezi, and Deményi. A special unit of fifty gendarmes from the Mérk area increased their efficiency. The ghetto was liquidated in six transports: May 19 (3,006), May 22 (3,300), May 26 (3,336), May 29 (3,306), May 30 (3,300), and June 1 (2,615), with a total of 18,863 Jews sent to Auschwitz concentration camp.
