= Reghin ghetto =

The Reghin ghetto was one of the Nazi-era ghettos for European Jews during World War II. It was located in the city of Reghin (Hungarian: Szászrégen) in Mureș County, Transylvania, now part of Romania but administered by the Kingdom of Hungary from the 1940 Second Vienna Award's grant of Northern Transylvania until late 1944. It was active in the spring of 1944, following Operation Margarethe.

== History ==
The ghetto was located in a brick factory unsuitable for habitation, selected by mayor Imre Schmidt and police chief János Dudás. Together with Adolf Eichmann's assistant László Endre, they had both taken part in a planning conference at Târgu Mureș on April 28. In the matters of selecting a site for the ghetto and the operation of rounding up Jews, they were aided by Major László Komáromi, head of the city's Royal Hungarian Army unit; lieutenant G. Szentpály Kálmán, commander of the local gendarmerie unit; and Jenő Csordácsics, adviser at city hall and the local "expert" in Jewish matters.

Most of the Jews were housed in buildings without walls, previously used for drying bricks. Some had to live outdoors, while a few were allowed to live in houses near the ghetto, and the edge of the city. At its peak, the ghetto housed 4,000 people, of whom some 1,400 came from the city itself, with the rest brought in from the eastern part of Maros-Torda County (Mureș-Turda) and the north of Csík County (Ciuc). The residents of the Sfântu Gheorghe ghetto also ended up there. The Jews of Gheorgheni were taken in under supervision by mayor Mátyás Tóth and his police chief Géza Polánkai. This included Jews who had received an exemption; the entire community was placed in the primary school building, where local policeman Béla Ferenczi led the search for valuables. After spending three days in the building with almost no food, the Jews were transported to Reghin's ghetto.

Conditions were similar to those found in other ghettos of the region. Local police and a special unit of forty gendarmes from Szeged guarded the ghetto. These individuals searched Jews for valuables, aided by Pál Bányai, Balázs Biró, András Fehér and István Gősi, members of special investigative units from the gendarmerie. Béla Ferenczi was asked to come from Gheorgheni to Reghin in order to help with the interrogation of Jews from his hometown. Irma Lovas led the vaginal inspections for hidden goods. The ghetto was under the direct command of János Dudás. On June 4, 3,149 Jews from the ghetto left on a train bound for the Auschwitz concentration camp.
