= Munkács Ghetto =

Nazi ghetto in occupied Ukraine

Ghetto Munkács or Ghetto Mukachevo was a ghetto established by Nazi Germany in Munkács (Mukachevo) in Hungary. The ghetto was one of the first ghettos in Hungary, along with several other ghettos in Transcarpathia (now in Ukraine). Two ghettos were established in the city, one for the city and one for the surrounding area.

== Establishment of the Ghetto ==
In March 1944, two ghettos were established in Munkács, one for the city's residents and one for the area's residents. The city ghetto was intended to house 15,000 Jews, and the area ghetto - 14,000. The city ghetto was established in a neighborhood that was densely populated by Jews, the second ghetto was established in the "Shiyovitz" brick factory. At the beginning of April, consultations and discussions were held between the Hungarian Ministry of the Interior, SS officers, gendarmerie, and police, in which they discussed the Jews of Hungary. Eventually, it was decided to concentrate the Jews, plunder their property, and send them out of Hungary's borders. Originally, every Jew in Transcarpathia was supposed to be in the ghetto by April 6, 1944, but the process of bringing the Jews into the ghetto was delayed because the Hungarian army claimed that a rapid process would disrupt its activities in the area. On April 15, a consultation took place in Munkács in the presence of Dieter Wisliceny, one of Adolf Eichmann's senior aides, on concentrating the city's Jews in the ghetto. Eichmann himself visited the Munkács ghetto at the end of April accompanied by Laszlo Endre. On April 18, after Passover. Two days later, all Jews of Munkács were concentrated in the ghetto, except for a few dozen Jews who had distinguished themselves in the Hungarian army in World War I. Later, the area of the ghetto was reduced.

== Life in the Ghetto ==
On the first Sabbath after the Jews entered the ghetto, hundreds of Jews were forced to destroy the synagogues in the city. The affairs of the ghetto were managed by the Judenrat (see also Jewish councils in Hungary), whose members lived in a special area, along with their families. In this area was also located the Jewish hospital of the ghetto. The head of the Judenrat was Sándor Steiner. Every day, about 11,000 cooked food portions were prepared in the ghetto kitchen, but they were not enough for all the residents of the ghetto.

== Deportation of the Ghetto Jews ==
On May 8 and 9, discussions were held for the transfer of the Jews of Transcarpathia and mainly from Munkács. It was determined that each train would transfer about 3,000 Jews. The ghetto inhabitants in the brick factory were transferred to Auschwitz on May 15, 1944, and the Jews of the city ghetto were transferred between May 19 and 24. In total, 9 trains departed, containing 28,587 Jews.
