= Baia Mare ghetto =

The Baia Mare ghetto was one of the Nazi-era ghettos for European Jews during World War II. It was located in the city of Baia Mare (Hungarian: Nagybánya) in Maramureș County, Transylvania, now part of Romania but administered as part of Szatmár County by the Kingdom of Hungary from the 1940 Second Vienna Award's grant of Northern Transylvania until late 1944. It was active in the spring of 1944, following Operation Margarethe.

== History ==
The process of ghettoization for the Jews of Baia Mare and the communities of Szatmár County's southeastern districts took place several days after a conference in Satu Mare set basic operational parameters for the process. A meeting of local officials took place at the Baia Mare Arrow Cross Party headquarters; Adolf Eichmann's assistant László Endre was also in attendance. Károly Tamás, the mayor's assistant, first represented the city, but he was soon replaced by István Rosner, an aide to the chief of police who showed more enthusiasm. Other participants included Jenő Nagy, chief of police; Sándor Vajai, former general secretary of the mayor's office; Tibor Várhelyi, commander of the local gendarmerie unit; Gyula Gergely, head of Northern Transylvania's Arrow Cross Party; and József Haracsek, leader of the Baross Organization, a virulently anti-Semitic association of Christian businessmen.

Jews from the city itself were housed on the vacant lot of the König glass factory, while those from the districts of Baia Mare, Șomcuta Mare and Copalnic-Mănăștur were placed in barns in Valea Borcutului village, some 3 km distant from the city center. Jenő Nagy and Gyula Gergely supervised the roundup of the Jews and the search for their valuables; SS officer Franz Abromeit assisted. Some 3,500 residents lived in the city ghetto, with a further 2,000 in Valea Borcutului. Of the latter, only about 200 could fit into the barns, with the rest living outside. Tibor Várhelyi was the ghetto's commander.

As was customary, the Jews were tortured and subjected to other methods of interrogation. These were led by Nagy and Várhelyi; their assistants included Károly Balogh and László Berentes, associates at the city's Phoenix Factory, as well as Haracsek, Péter Czeisberger, Zoltán Osváth and the detectives József Orgoványi, Imre Vajai and István Bertalan. On 25 April, the Döme Sztójay government named Barnabás Endrödi county prefect, and he held general responsibility for the area's administration. The deportations from Baia Mare took place in two transports: 31 May (3,073) and 5 June (2,844), with a total of 5,916 Jews sent to the Auschwitz concentration camp.
