= Northern Transylvania =

Region of Romania that became part of Hungary in 1940; returned to Romania in 1944

Northern Transylvania Ardealul de Nord (ro) Észak-Erdély (hu)
- Territory of the Kingdom of Hungary (1940–1945); Territory under the Allied Control Commission administration (1944–1945)
- Flag Coat of arms

- Northern Transylvania is highlighted in dark green
- Area
  - 1940: 43,104 km^{2} (16,643 sq mi)
- Population
  - 1940: 2,577,260
  - Type: Military, later civil administration (1940–1944); Military (1944–1945)
- Historical era: World War II
  - Second Vienna Award: 30 August 1940
  - Occupation: 5–13 September
  - Military administration: 11 September 1940
  - Incorporation: 8 October 1940
  - Civil administration: 26 November 1940
  - Battle for Transylvania: 26 August – 25 October 1944
  - Second Vienna Award voided by the Allied Commission: 12 September 1944
  - Romanian administration restored: 9 March 1945
  - Paris Peace Treaty: 10 February 1947
- Political subdivisions: Counties: Beszterce-Naszód; Bihar; Csík; Háromszék; Kis-Küküllő; Kolozs; Maros-Torda; Máramaros; Szatmár; Szilágy; Szolnok-Doboka; Udvarhely; Ugocsa
Preceded by	Succeeded by
Kingdom of Romania	Kingdom of Romania
- Today part of: Romania

Northern Transylvania (Romanian: Ardealul de Nord; Hungarian: Észak-Erdély) was the region of the Kingdom of Romania that during World War II, as a consequence of the August 1940 territorial agreement known as the Second Vienna Award, became part of the Kingdom of Hungary. With an area of 43,104 km^{2} (16,643 sq mi), the population was largely composed of both ethnic Romanians and Hungarians.

In October 1944, Soviet and Romanian forces gained control of the territory, and by March 1945 Northern Transylvania returned to Romanian administration. After the war, this was confirmed by the Paris Peace Treaties of 1947.

== Background ==
Transylvania has a varied history. Once part of the Kingdom of Dacia (82 BC–106 AD), in 106 AD, the Roman Empire conquered the territory, after the Roman legions withdrew in 271 AD, it was overrun by a succession of various tribes such as Carpi, Visigoths, Huns, Gepids, Avars, and Slavs, in the 9th century various parts came under the rule of the First Bulgarian Empire.

The Magyars conquered the Carpathian Basin at the end of the 9th century and for almost six hundred years, Transylvania was a voivodeship in the Kingdom of Hungary. After the Hungarian defeat at Battle of Mohács by the Ottomans in 1526, two rival kings claimed the Hungarian kingdom. The Eastern Hungarian Kingdom is the predecessor of the Principality of Transylvania, which was established by the Treaty of Speyer in 1570 and the Eastern Hungarian King became the first Prince of Transylvania. The Principality of Transylvania was a semi-independent state, and a vassal state of the Ottoman Empire under the rule of the local Hungarian nobility, it continued to be part of the Kingdom of Hungary in the sense of public law, John Sigismund's possessions belonged to the Holy Crown of Hungary, and was a symbol of the survival of Hungarian statehood. In 1690, it became part of the Habsburg monarchy as the Lands of the Hungarian Crown, and after 1848, and again from 1867 to 1918 it was reincorporated into the Kingdom of Hungary. The Austro-Hungarian Empire was dissolved after World War I, in the wake of the expected territorial rearrangements, the dispute over Transylvania and former ethnic tensions escalated between Romania and Hungary. The elected representatives of the Romanian National Assembly proclaimed the Union with Romania on 1 December 1918, while the Hungarian General Assembly 22 December 1918 reaffirmed their loyalty to the Hungarian state. By 1919, as a result of the Hungarian–Romanian War, much of Eastern Hungary - including Transylvania - fell under Romanian control. Eventually on 4 June 1920 the Treaty of Trianon assigned Transylvania and further areas to the Kingdom of Romania.

Considered as a national tragedy having about 3,3 million Hungarians (32% of its ethnic Hungarians) outside the new borders, the loss of 71% of its historical territory, majority of its economy, Hungary sought for revision which in the 1930's culminated as a primary goal and significantly determined her international and external politics. After the successful revision regarding southern Czechoslovakia by the First Vienna Award in 1938 and the full recovery of Carpathian Ruthenia in 1939, the Hungarian Government prepared to resolve the Transylvanian question and initiated a mass mobilization near the Hungarian-Romanian border. At the early stage of World War II the Axis Powers were not interested in the outbreak of another armed conflicts in the wake of other ongoing military events, therefore they intervened to persuade the parties to enforce diplomatic solution to reduce tensions in order to prevent further escalation.

== Second Vienna Award ==
Romania's territorial losses in the summer of 1940

In June 1940, Romania was forced (as a consequence of the Molotov–Ribbentrop Pact) to submit to a Soviet ultimatum and accept the annexation of Bessarabia and Northern Bukovina. Subsequently, Hungary attempted to regain Transylvania, which it had lost in the immediate aftermath of World War I. Germany and Italy pressured both Hungary and Romania to resolve the situation in a bilateral agreement. The two delegations met in Turnu Severin on 16 August, but the negotiations failed due to a demand for a 60,000 square kilometres (23,000 sq mi) territory from the Hungarian side and only an offer of population exchange from the Romanian side. To impede a Hungarian-Romanian war in their "hinterland", the Axis powers pressured both governments to accept their arbitration: the Second Vienna Award, signed on 30 August 1940.

== Population ==
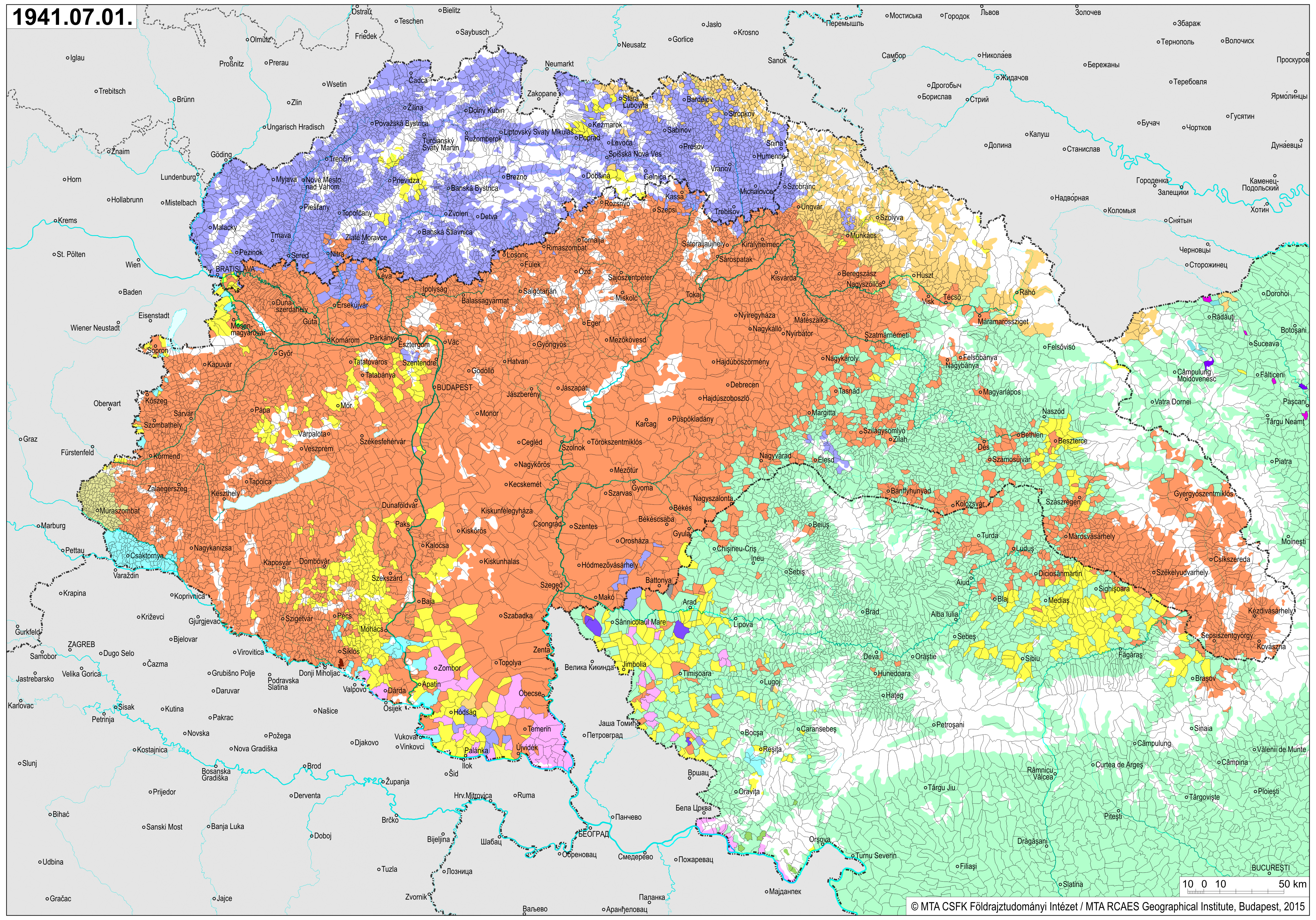
Ethnic map of the Kingdom of Hungary in 1941 and the Carpatho-Pannonian area, based on the Slovak (1940), Hungarian (1941), and Romanian (1941) censuses. Hungarians Croats Germans Serbs Slovaks Slovenes Romanians Ruthenians Uninhabited

After World War I, the multiethnic Kingdom of Hungary was divided by the 1920 Treaty of Trianon, to form several new states, but Hungary noted that the new state borders did not follow ethnic boundaries. Hungarians were the majority in border regions outside the post-Trianon Hungarian borders in Czechoslovakia, Romania and Yugoslavia. Deep within Romania, far from the Hungarian border, in the region of eastern Transylvania known as Székely Land, the Hungarian population found itself in the unusual situation of being an overwhelming majority. By the Second Vienna Award, the solution decided upon was to carve out a claw-shaped corridor with mixed population through northwestern Romania, which included a large Romanian-populated area, in order to incorporate this Hungarian-majority region into Hungary.

Historian Keith Hitchins summarizes the situation created by the award:

Far from settling matters, the Vienna Award had exacerbated relations between Romania and Hungary. It did not solve the nationality problem by separating all Magyars from all Romanians. Some 1,150,000 to 1,300,000 Romanians, or 48 percent to over 50 percent of the population of the ceded territory, depending upon whose statistics are used, remained north of the new frontier, while about 500,000 Magyars (other Hungarian estimates go as high as 800,000, Romanian as low as 363,000) continued to reside in the south.

Ethnic map

The 1930 Romanian census registered for the region a population of 2,393,300. In 1941, the Hungarian authorities conducted a new census, which registered a total population of 2,578,100. Both censuses asked language and nationality separately.

Major ethnic groups	1930 Romanian census		1941 Hungarian census	
Major ethnic groups	Nationality	Language	Nationality	Language
Hungarian	912,500 (38.13%)	1,007,200 (42.08%)	1,380,500 (53.55%)	1,344,000 (52.13%)
Romanian	1,176,900 (49.17%)	1,165,800 (48.71%)	1,029,000 (39.91%)	1,068,700 (41.45%)
German	68,300 (2.85%)	59,700 (2.49%)	44,600 (1.73%)	47,300 (1.83%)
Jewish (Yiddish language)	138,800 (5.80%)	99,600 (4.16%)	47,400 (1.83%)	48,500 (1.88%)
Other	96,800 (4.04%)	61,000 (2.55%)	76,600 (2.97%)	69,600 (2.70%)
Total	2,393,300		2,578,100	

The dissimilar ratios were caused by a combination of complex factors such as migration, the assimilation of Jews, and bilingual speakers. According to Hungarian registrations, 100,000 Hungarian refugees had arrived in Hungary from South Transylvania by January 1941. By then, there were a total of 109,532 Romanian refugees from Northern Transylvania. A fall in the total population suggests that a further 40,000 to 50,000 Romanians moved from North Transylvania to South Transylvania, including refugees who were omitted from the official registration for various reasons. Additionally, Hungarian gains by assimilation were balanced by losses for other groups of native speakers, such as Jews.

== Hungarian rule ==
Hungary held Northern Transylvania from September 1940 to October 1944. In 1940, ethnic disturbances between Hungarians and Romanians continued after some incidents following the entrance of the Hungarian Army, culminating in massacres at Treznea and Ip. In the first two weeks approximately 1000 Romanians perished.

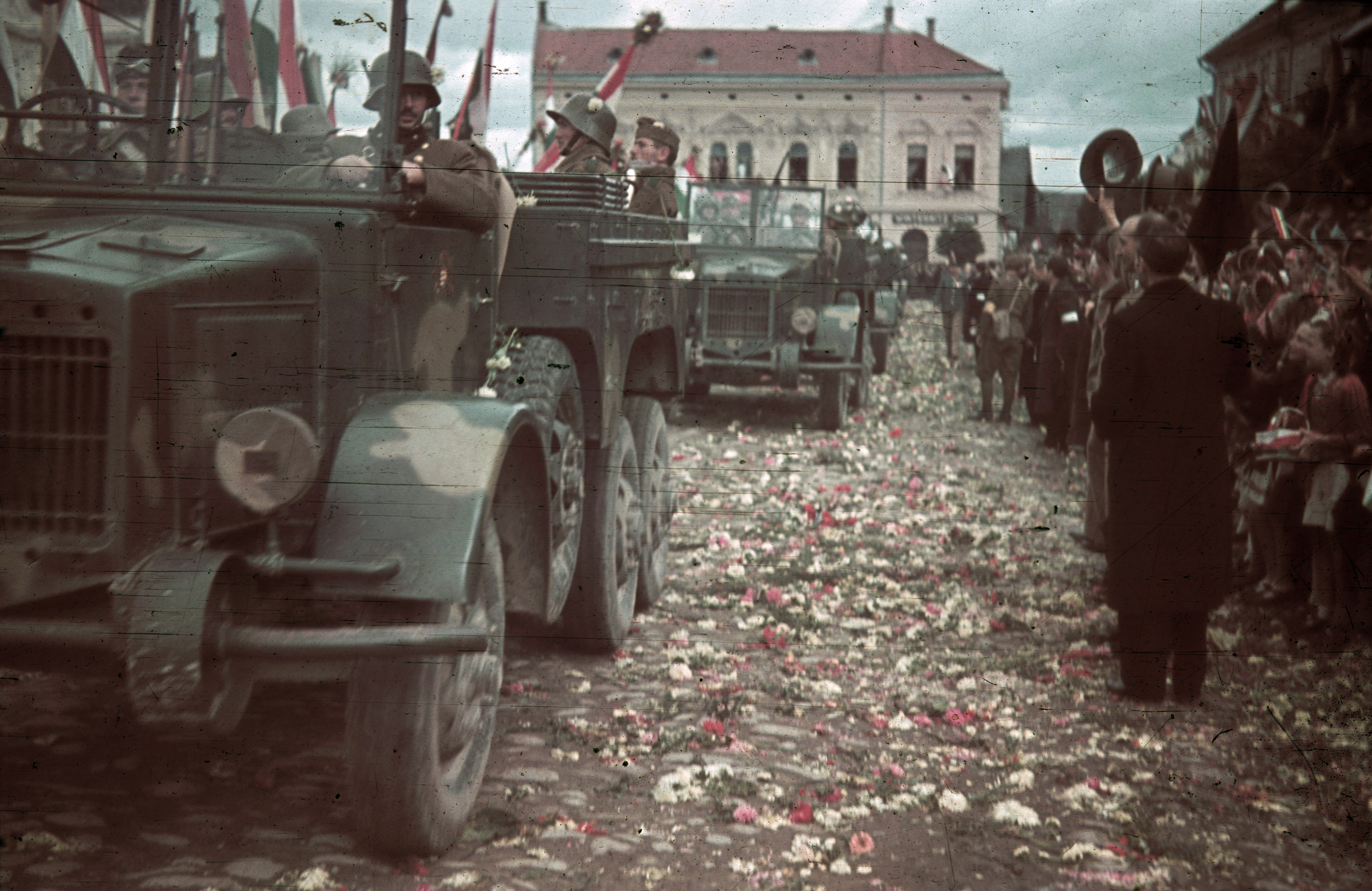
Crowds throw flowers to welcome the Hungarian troops into Kézdivásárhely (Târgu Secuiesc), September 13, 1940

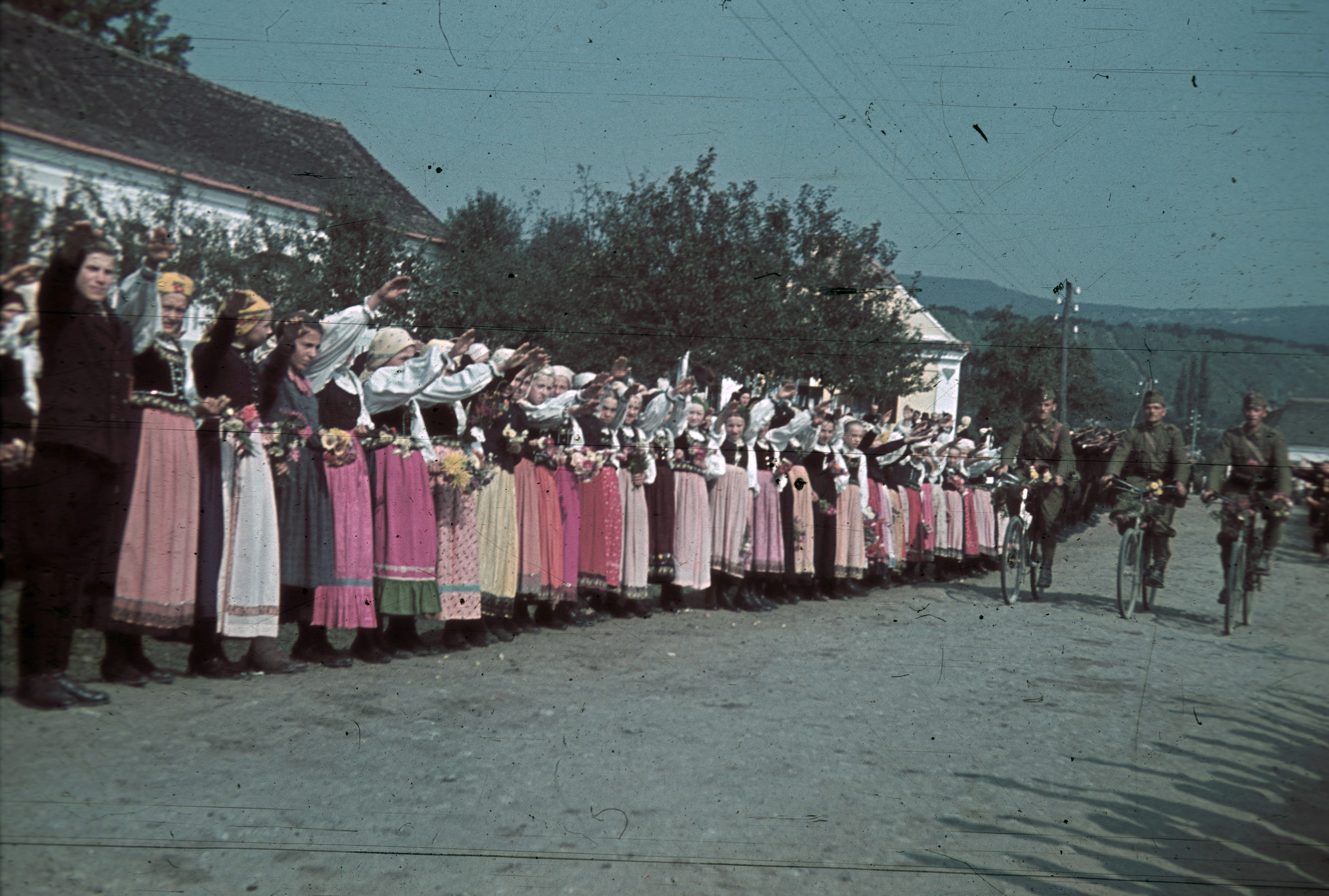
Ethnic Germans giving the Nazi salute while welcoming the Hungarian troops

On 5 September 1940, five days after the Second Vienna Award, the first Hungarian military unit crossed the border at Sighetul Marmației. Two Hungarian armies entered the territory of annexed Transylvania: the first army (with a force of 208,000 soldiers) operated in the northeastern part of Transylvania, while the second army (with a staff of 102,000 soldiers) operated in the Oradea-Cluj area.

On the first day, the main occupied cities were Carei, Satu Mare, Sighetul Marmației, and Ocna Șugatag. Nine stages of progress were established, each over a distance of 40-80 kilometers. The last localities taken over, on 13 September 1940, were Sfântu Gheorghe and Târgu Secuiesc. The advance of Hungarian units took place in peaceful conditions, with only a few scattered incidents with Romanian soldiers retreating to southern Transylvania. The Hungarian army was greeted enthusiastically by the majority of the Hungarian population, which was documented in detail in the 1940 films, with the parade of military units, as well as Horthy riding on a gray horse, marching through the main cities of Northern Transylvania.

After some ethnic Hungarian groups considered unreliable or insecure were sacked/expelled from Southern Transylvania, the Hungarian officials also regularly expelled some Romanian groups from Northern Transylvania. Many Hungarians and Romanians either fled or chose to opt between the two countries. There was a mass exodus; over 100,000 people on both sides of the ethnic and political borders relocated. This continued until 1944.

Following the occupation of Hungary by Nazi Germany on 19 March 1944, Northern Transylvania came under German military occupation. Like the Jews living in Hungary, most of the Jews in Northern Transylvania (about 150,000) were sent to concentration camps during World War II, a move that was facilitated by local military and civilians. Following several decrees of the Hungarian government and high-level consultations at a meeting on 26 April with László Endre in Szatmárnémeti (now Satu Mare), the deportation of the Jews was decided. On 3 May, authorities in Dés (now Dej) launched the action of ghettoization of Jews in the Bungăr forest, where 3,700 Jews from Dej and 4,100 Jews from other localities in the area were imprisoned. During the operation of the Dej ghetto, Jews were mistreated, tortured, and starved. The deportation of the Jews to the Nazi death camps was done with freight wagons, in three stages: the first transport on 28 May (when 3,150 Jews were deported), the second on 6 June (when 3,360 Jews were deported), and the third on 8 June (when the last 1,364 Jews were deported). Most of those deported were exterminated in the Auschwitz–Birkenau camp, with just over 800 deportees surviving. The Kolozsvár Ghetto (in what is now Cluj-Napoca) was initiated on 3 May, and was put under the command of László Urbán, the local police chief. The ghetto, comprising about 18,000 Jews, was liquidated in six transports to Auschwitz, with the first deportation occurring on 25 May, and the last one on 9 June. Other ghettoes that were set up in Northern Transylvania during this period were the Oradea ghetto (the largest one, with 35,000 Jews), the Baia Mare ghetto, the Bistrița ghetto, the Cehei ghetto, the Reghin ghetto, the Satu Mare ghetto, and the Sfântu Gheorghe ghetto. If one excludes the Szekely area, 127,377 Jews were deported to the Auschwitz death camp, 19,764 returned and 107,613 did not return.

After King Michael's Coup of 23 August 1944, Romania left the Axis and joined the Allies. Thus, the Romanian Army fought Nazi Germany and its allies in Romania – regaining Northern Transylvania – and further on, in German occupied Hungary and in Slovakia and Protectorate of Bohemia and Moravia, for instance, in the Budapest Offensive, the Siege of Budapest, and the Prague Offensive.

The Second Vienna Award was voided by the Allied Commission through the Armistice Agreement with Romania (12 September 1944) whose Article 19 stipulated the following: "The Allied Governments regard the decision of the Vienna award regarding Transylvania as null and void and are agreed that Transylvania (or the greater part thereof) should be returned to Romania, subject to confirmation at the peace settlement, and the Soviet Government agrees that Soviet forces shall take part for this purpose in joint military operations with Romania against Germany and Hungary."

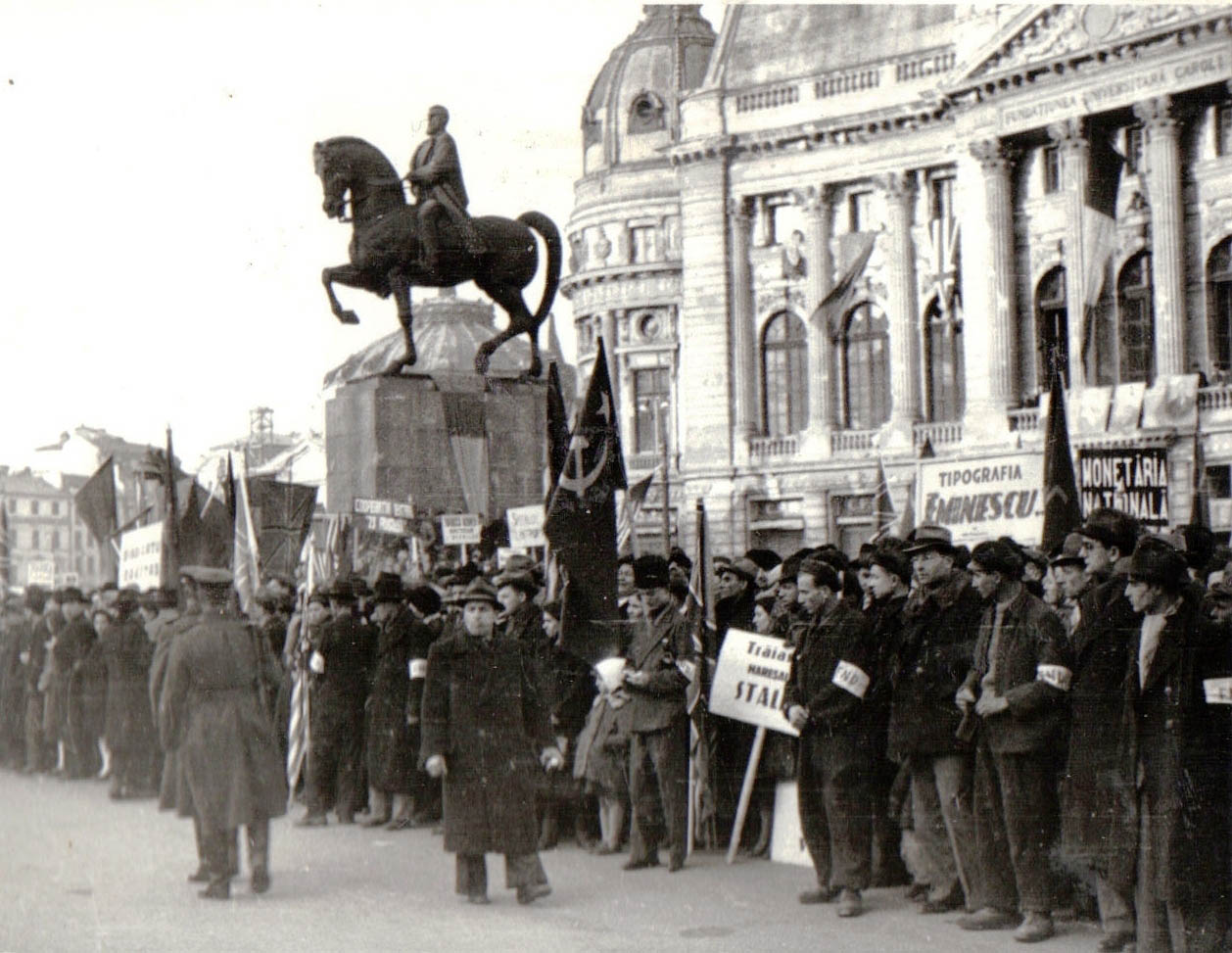
Demonstration in Bucharest's Palace Square celebrating Northern Transylvania's return, 14 March 1945

The territory was occupied by the Allied forces by late October 1944. On 25 October, at the Battle of Carei, units of the Romanian 4th Army under the command of General Gheorghe Avramescu defeated the last remaining Hungarian and German troops in the area and took control of the last piece of the territory ceded in 1940 to Hungary. However, due to the activities of Romanian paramilitary forces, the Soviets expelled the Romanian administration from Northern Transylvania in November 1944 and did not allow them to return until 10 March 1945.

On 20 January 1945, the Provisional National Government of Hungary accepted the obligation to evacuate all Hungarian troops and officials from the territory, to retreat to its pre-war borders, and to repeal all legislative and administrative regulations in connection with the incorporation of the territory.

The 1947 Paris Peace Treaty reaffirmed the borders between Romania and Hungary, as originally defined in the Treaty of Trianon, 27 years earlier, thus confirming the return of Northern Transylvania to Romania.

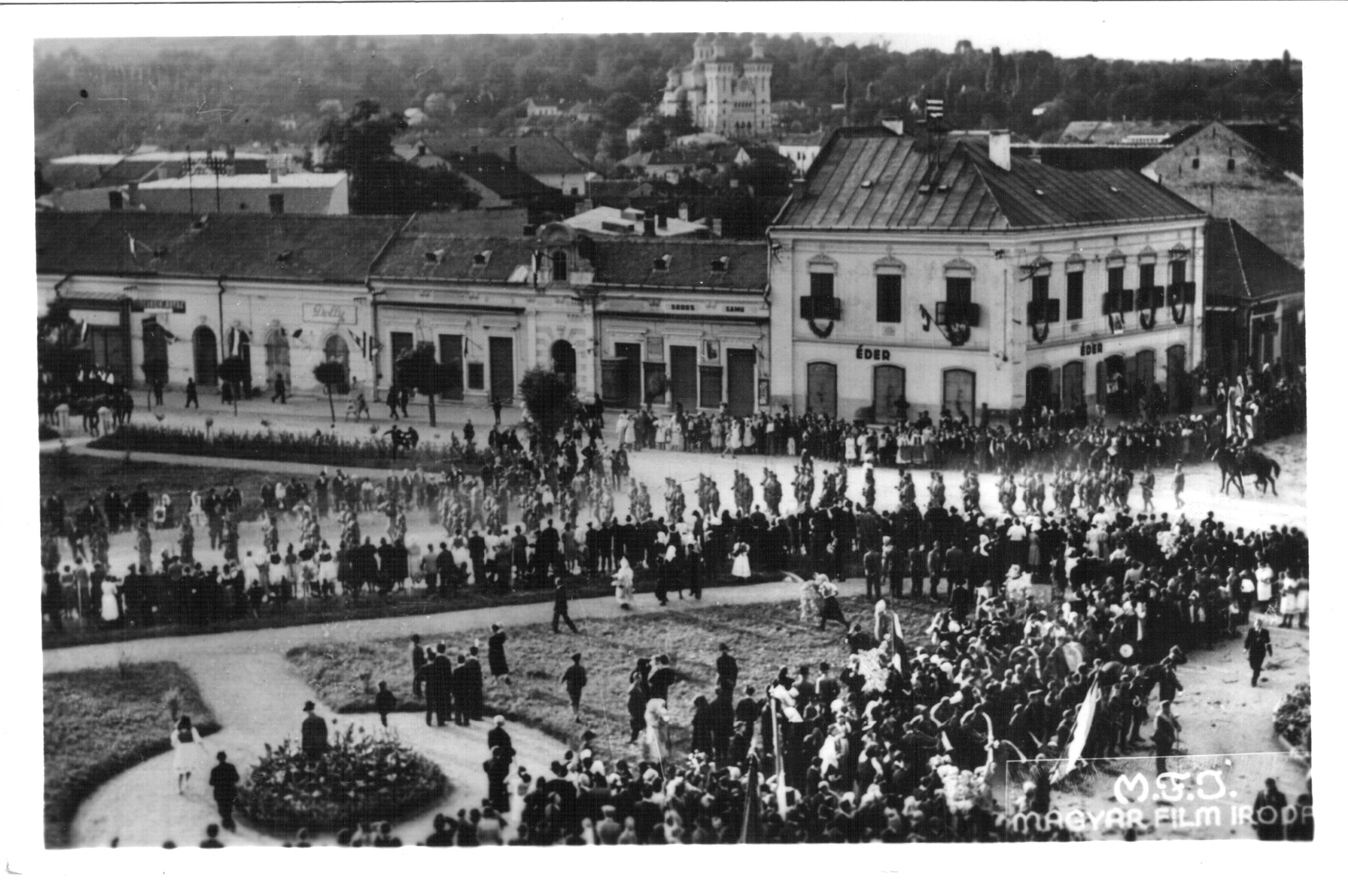
Hungarian troops marching in Zalău (Zilah) on 8 September 1940

=== Romanian statistics on abuses committed by Hungarian authorities ===
In a statistical report of the State Secretariat for Nationalities, from Bucharest, on the situation in Northern Transylvania from 30 August 1940 to 1 November 1941, 919 murders, 1,126 maimings, 4,126 beatings, 15,893 arrests, 124 desecrations, 78 and 447 collective and individual devastations are mentioned. A few days after the installation, the occupation authorities started deporting the Romanians to the camps. According to a report by the camp commander in the town of Püspökladány, it turns out that 1,315 Romanians were interned in that camp alone in September 1940, well above its maximum capacity. Consequently, that same month, other camps were established at Szamosfalva (now Someșeni) and Szászfenes (now Florești), near Kolozsvár (now Cluj).

There were also mass expulsions of ethnic Romanians across the new border imposed by the Second Vienna Award, especially of those considered dangerous or presumably hostile to the new regime. Beginning in 1940, the expulsions were practiced until 1944, when, in September and October, the Hungarian authorities were expelled by the Soviet and Romanian military units. Until 1 January 1941, there were a total of 109,532 Romanian refugees, of which 11,957 were Transylvanians expelled by the Hungarian authorities (including cases of ethnic Hungarians not recognized as Hungarians).

A statistical covering the period from 1 September 1940 to 1 December 1943 indicates a total of 218,919 expelled persons. This included numerous refugees who left their localities of residence out of fear of the new Hungarian administration. On 23 August 1944, when King Michael's Coup turned Romania against the Axis and together with the Soviet forces the occupation of Northern Transylvania began, there were over 500,000 people from the ceded territory based on the Second Vienna Award in Romania.

During this period, Romanian schools and churches also suffered. On the territory of the ceded part of Transylvania, there were (on 30 August 1940) 1,666 Romanian-language elementary schools and 67 high school, vocational and higher education units. At the beginning of the 1941/1942 school year, the number of primary schools decreased by 792 units, and in 1940/1941 there was only one high school with Romanian as the language of instruction – the one in Naszód (now Năsăud) – and only "seven" Romanian sections within high schools with another language of instruction.

However, in a few cases, there were also Hungarian locals who were involved in rescuing Romanian families. Among them is the case of József Gáll, who saved several Romanians from death during the Treznea Massacre. A testimony in this regard is that of Gavril Butcovan, one of the survivors of the drama in Ip commune, Sălaj:

I have to tell you the truth to the end. Not all my countrymen made a deal with the Horthyist criminals. There were also Hungarians who came to defend Romanian families, putting their lives in danger through this gesture. Thus, at least three Romanian families were saved from the murderous hands of the Horthyists. Certainly, if the criminal action had taken place during the day, there would have been many more who would have come to our aid (the Romanians), and certainly the number of those killed would be much smaller.

There were cases in which Hungarian locals fell victim trying to help the Romanians. Among them was the maid Sarolta Juhász from Omboztelke (now Mureșenii de Câmpie), who was killed along with the entire family of the town's Romanian priest Bujor while trying to protect them from the Hungarian army.

=== List of massacres in Northern Transylvania (1940–1944) ===
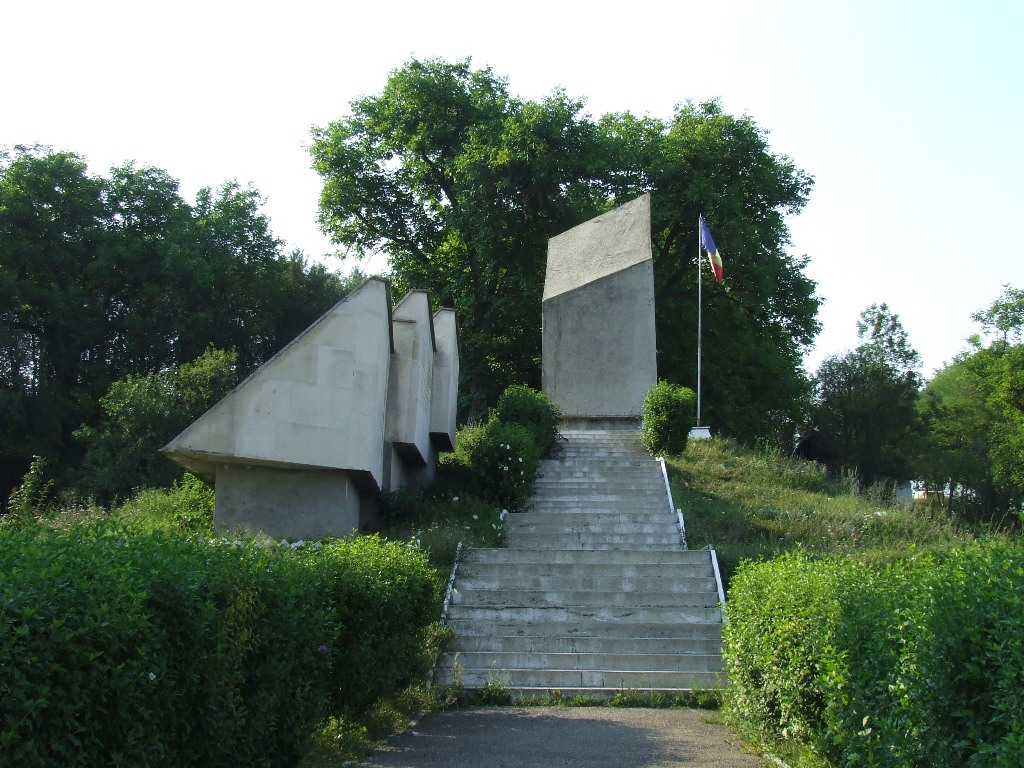
Monument in memory of the victims of the Treznea massacre

- Nușfalău massacre
- Treznea massacre
- Ip massacre
- Moisei massacre
- Turda massacre

== Geography ==
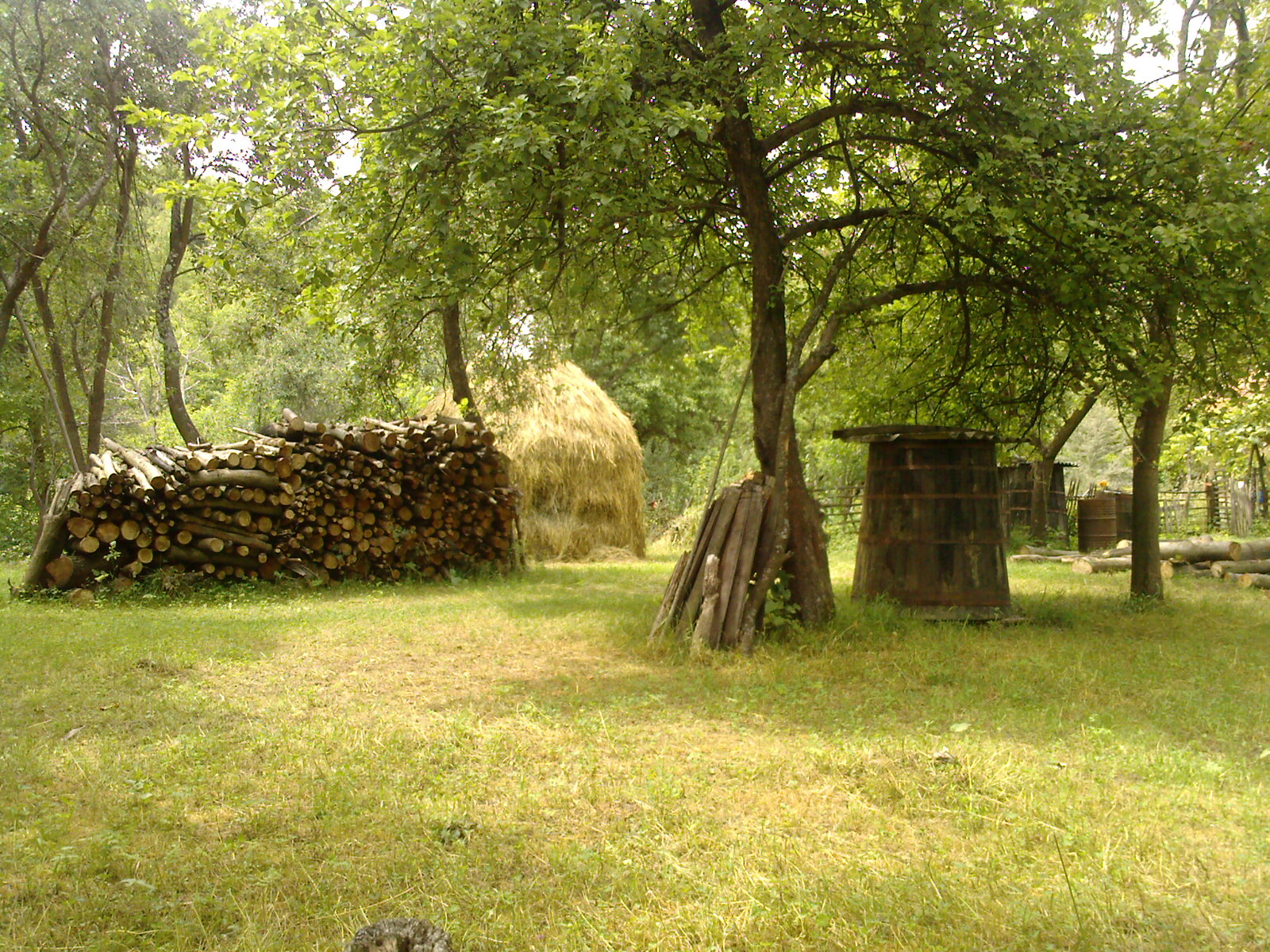
Countryside landscape, Sălaj County

Northern Transylvania is a diverse region, both in terms of landscape and population. It contains both largely rural areas (such as Bistrița-Năsăud County) as well as major cities, such as Cluj-Napoca, Oradea, Târgu Mureș, Baia Mare, and Satu Mare. Centers of Hungarian culture, such as Miercurea Ciuc and Sfântu Gheorghe, are also part of the region. An important tourist destination is Maramureș County, an area known for its beautiful rural scenery, local small woodwork, including wooden Churches, its craftwork industry, and its original rural architecture.

== See also ==
- Southern Transylvania
- Romanian People's Tribunals
- Northern Transylvania Holocaust Memorial Museum
- Magyar Autonomous Region

== Sources ==
- Varga E., Árpád (1999) [1998]. "Hungarians in Transylvania between 1870 and 1995" (PDF). Magyar Kisebbség. 3–4 (New series IV). Cluj/Kolozsvár: Teleki László Foundation: 331–407. ISSN 1224-2292.
