= Svislach Ghetto (Mogilev region) =

Svislach (Mogilev) Ghetto
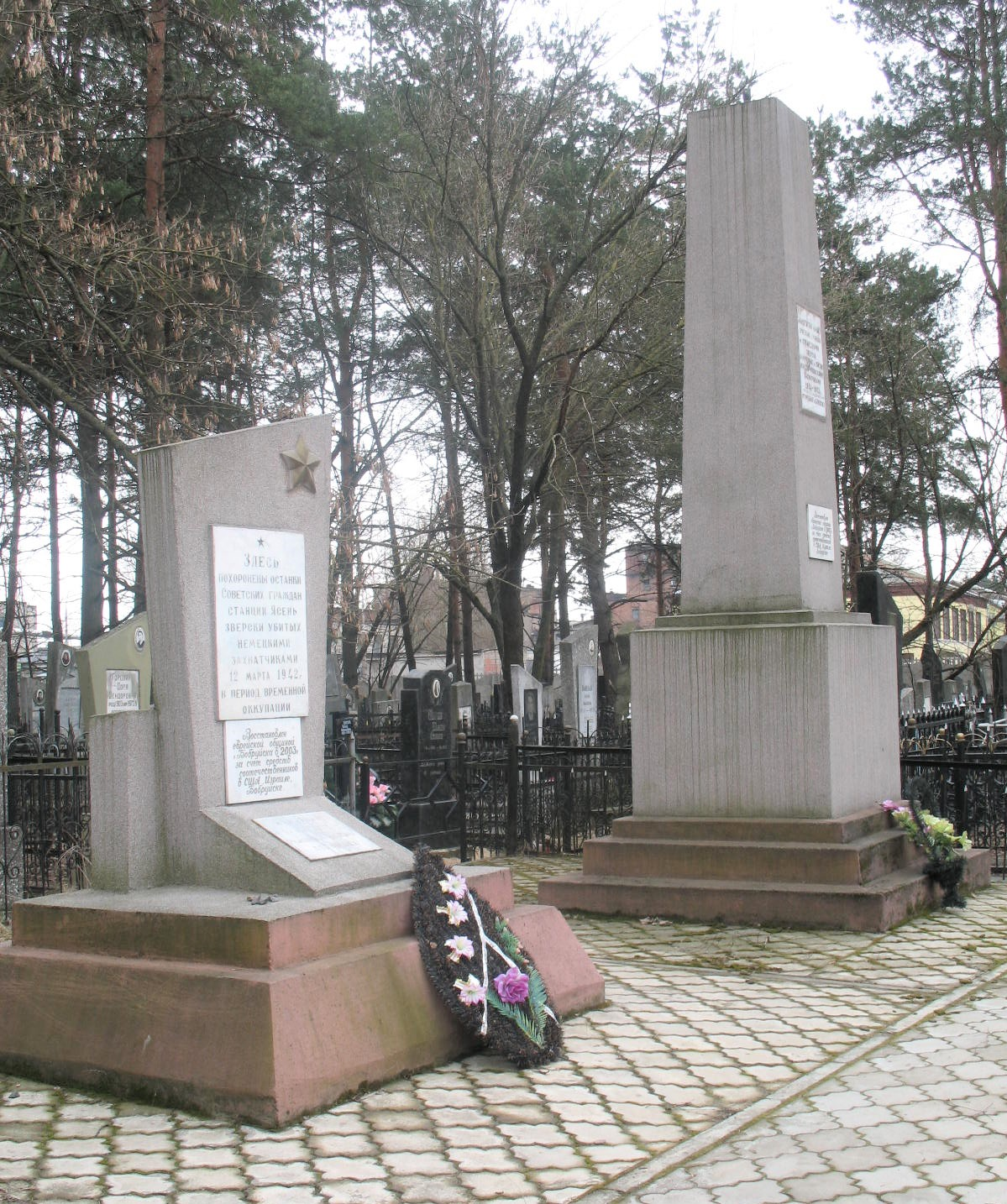
- Svislach and Yasen Holocaust memorial in Babruysk
- Location: Svislach, German-occupied Belarus
- Date: June 1941 - October 1942
- Incident type: Imprisonment, mass shootings, starvation, forced suicide, public humiliation
- Perpetrators: Germany
- Participants: Gestapo; Order Police battalions; Schutzstaffel; Wehrmacht
- Organizations: Schutzstaffel (SS)
- Camp: None
- Victims: Unknown, 200-1000
- Survivors: At least 3
- Witnesses: M.V. Bondarev
- Documentation: Yad Vashem; Journal of M.V. Bondarev
- Memorials: Svislach/Yasen Babruysker Memorial

The Ghetto in Svisloch was a ghetto for the forcefully relocated Jews of Svisloch in the Osipovichi district (Belarus), and nearby settlements. It was in operation during the Holocaust, from the summer of 1941 to autumn of 1942

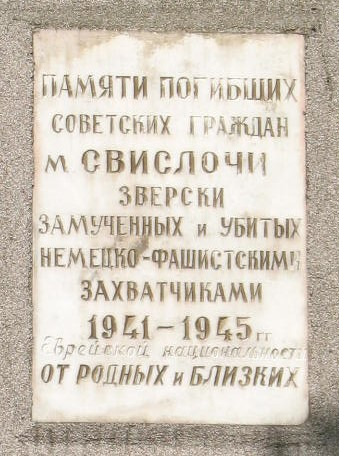
Svislach Ghetto plaque

== Creation and Occupation ==
By the summer of 1941, before Nazi occupation, there were between 600 and 700 Jews, among more than 1,000 inhabitants of Svisloch. The village was captured by German troops on June 29, 1941, and the occupation lasted until July 17, 1944, when the village was liberated by allied forces.

The police were housed in the building of the village council, and the first to be headed by a Volksdeutsche from local residents, a former forester Burstelle. Nikolai Bondar, a stove-maker, who came to the police with his sons, became a burgomaster of Svislach. He was replaced by Shidlovsky, a former military instructor at the Svislach secondary school.

== Conditions in the ghetto ==
In preparation for the extermination of Jews in the region, the Nazis organized a ghetto in Svislach. The ghetto was an open-type, lacking guards outside of the facility. It was constructed in the section of the village where Jews lived before the war.

The Jews of the village were required to wear yellow badges on the front and back of their clothing under order of the Nazi regime. Policemen Ivan Luzanov, Vasily Kobylyanets, Nikolai Bondar, and his nephews Grisha and Misha Yanovskiy nailed the same stars to buildings, marking them as Jewish households.

== Liquidation and massacres ==
To prevent military-aged men from uprising against the Nazis, male Jews aged between 15 and 50 were often killed, despite the lack of economic reason, as they were the most able-bodied prisoners. For these reasons, on July 3, 1941, the Germans took Jewish men to "work" at labor camps, although in reality, they were killed behind the bridge over the Berezina river. A group of at least 40 men were shot in late August and early September in a collective farm on a mountain, and they were buried in ditches dug the day prior. The Jews themselves were forced to dig the pits that they would later be buried in. The execution was carried out by the town's policemen under the command of the Germans.

In September, Nazi policemen gathered all Jewish women who were married to non-Jews, and said that they would be taken to Osipovichi. In reality, they were taken to Lipen, thrown off the bridge into the Svislach tributary, and shot from above.

On October 14, 1941, the Germans and the police drove the Jews out of their homes, took them by trucks to the forest of Virkau, and shot hundreds of Jews. According to eyewitnesses, on that day:

"...those who lived on the edge of Svislach were simply driven with sticks, women, children, old people through the streets on foot to their place of execution. Terrible cries, sobs, and screeches came from all over. The policemen brothers Bondari and their father yelled all over the street: "Beat the Jews, save Russia!". Aunt Rachel, the wife of a local rabbi, was being led to a truck, and some woman was tearing a downy shawl from her shoulder. In another place, two women attacked a Jewish girl, knocked her down, and began to pull shiny rubber boots off her feet. Moreover, one woman tore from one foot, and the second from another."

In the winter of 1941–1942, the conditions of the ghetto became unbearable. There were severe frosts, and the prisoners died of hunger and cold against the backdrop of incessant robberies and harassment by Nazis and other citizens of Svislach.

In the beginning of 1942, the Germans and the police herded the Jews into a "factory" site, near which pits had already been dug. Local residents stood around the site, and examined the prisoners and ordered the Jews to hand over their possessions, such as jewelry and clothes, to the policemen. The Jews who resisted or children who cried were severely beaten. They beat a female doctor, Mrs. Zaks, who did not hand over her cap. They beat and took away Miss Bella's coat, who asked policemen Marchenko, a friend of hers, to let her use the bathroom. Policemen from neighboring villages and SS officers arrived. An SS officer, under the threat of being shot, ordered the Jews to bring and hand over all the hidden winter clothes. When the Jews returned with their clothes, the Germans forced the half-dead Jews to sing and dance for several hours, and then released them back into the ghetto.

Later that year, during another "action" (a euphemism for massacres used by the Nazis), the last Jews of Svislach were killed, and the ghetto was liquidated.

== Survivors ==
Only a few Jews survived in Svislach, among whom were Israel Isaakovich Asievich, Bella Iosifovna Barshai, and Tsilya Gilievna Rubinchik.

In Svislach, Orthodox Priest Stefan Kuchinsky (1875-1955) was awarded the honorary title Righteous Among the Nations from the Yad Vashem Memorial Institute as a sign of gratitude for his actions during the Holocaust, where he saved Leonid and Boris Gershanovich from being killed.

== Memorial ==
The exact number of Jews who died in Svislach during the Holocaust is not known. So far, 202 names and surnames of the victims of the genocide have been identified and published. In 2018, the diary of M.V. Bondarev, a resident of Svislach, was discovered, which refers to 1,016 Jews killed in Svislach.

After the war, at the site of the mass execution, the Jews of Svislach, who returned from the evacuation by the Red Army, erected a small obelisk with a metal fence. Subsequently, the monument was removed, and the ashes of those killed were reburied at the Jewish cemetery in Bobruisk. As of 2021, the place of execution in Svislach is not indicated. In 1949, in Bobruisk, an obelisk was erected at the place of reburial with the word "In memory of the dead Soviet citizens of Svislach, brutally tortured and killed by Nazi Invaders in 1941-1945; From relatives and friends" In 2003, at the initiative of the Jewish community of Bobruisk, the monument was reconstructed and the words "of Jewish nationality" were added to the slab.
