= Southern Transylvania =

Southern Transylvania was a region of the Kingdom of Romania between 1940 and 1944, during World War II. The region of Transylvania, belonging entirely to Romania when the war started in 1939, was split in 1940 between Romania and Hungary, with the latter taking Northern Transylvania in the aftermath of the Second Vienna Award.

== Overview ==
Timișoara was the largest city in Southern Transylvania, with a population of 116,878 as of April 1941. However, this city was located in the Banat sub-region. The largest city in Southern Transylvania-proper was Brașov, with a population of 84,557 as of April 1941. Southern Transylvania-proper had a population of just over 1.74 million people.

Southern Transylvania (including its adjacent regions to its West) had a total area of 59,000 square kilometers. Subtracting from this area the areas of the five counties to its West: Timiș-Torontal (7,600 square km), Caraș (4,693), Severin (6,422 square km), Arad (6,248 square km) and the half of Bihor (~3,700 square km) which remained in Romania after the Second Vienna Award, the area of Southern Transylvania-proper amounted to just over 30,000 square km.

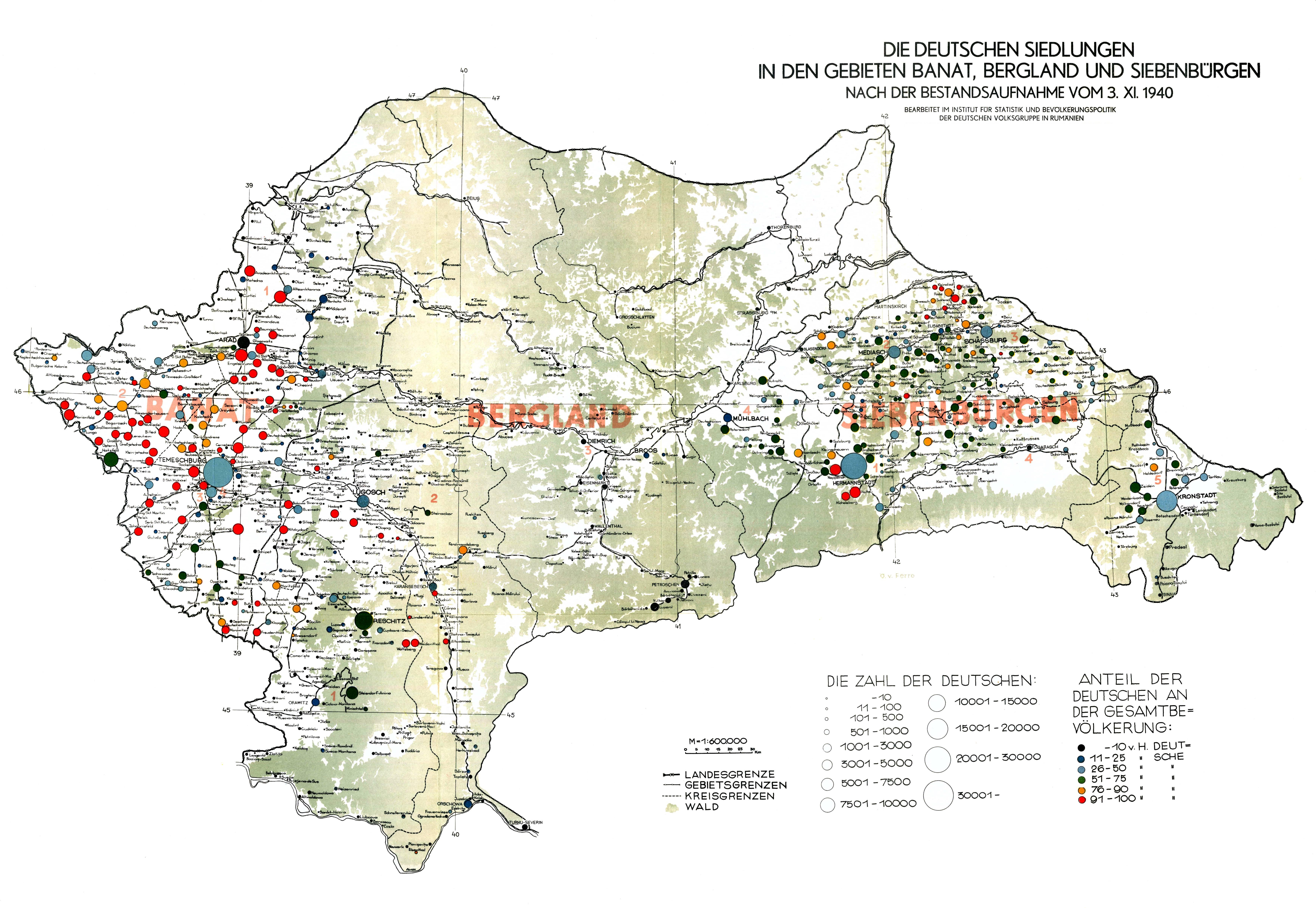
German map of Southern Transylvania, showing the ethnic German population

Romanian counties as of 1942: Southern Transylvania had a total of 13, 8 belonging to Southern Transylvania-proper

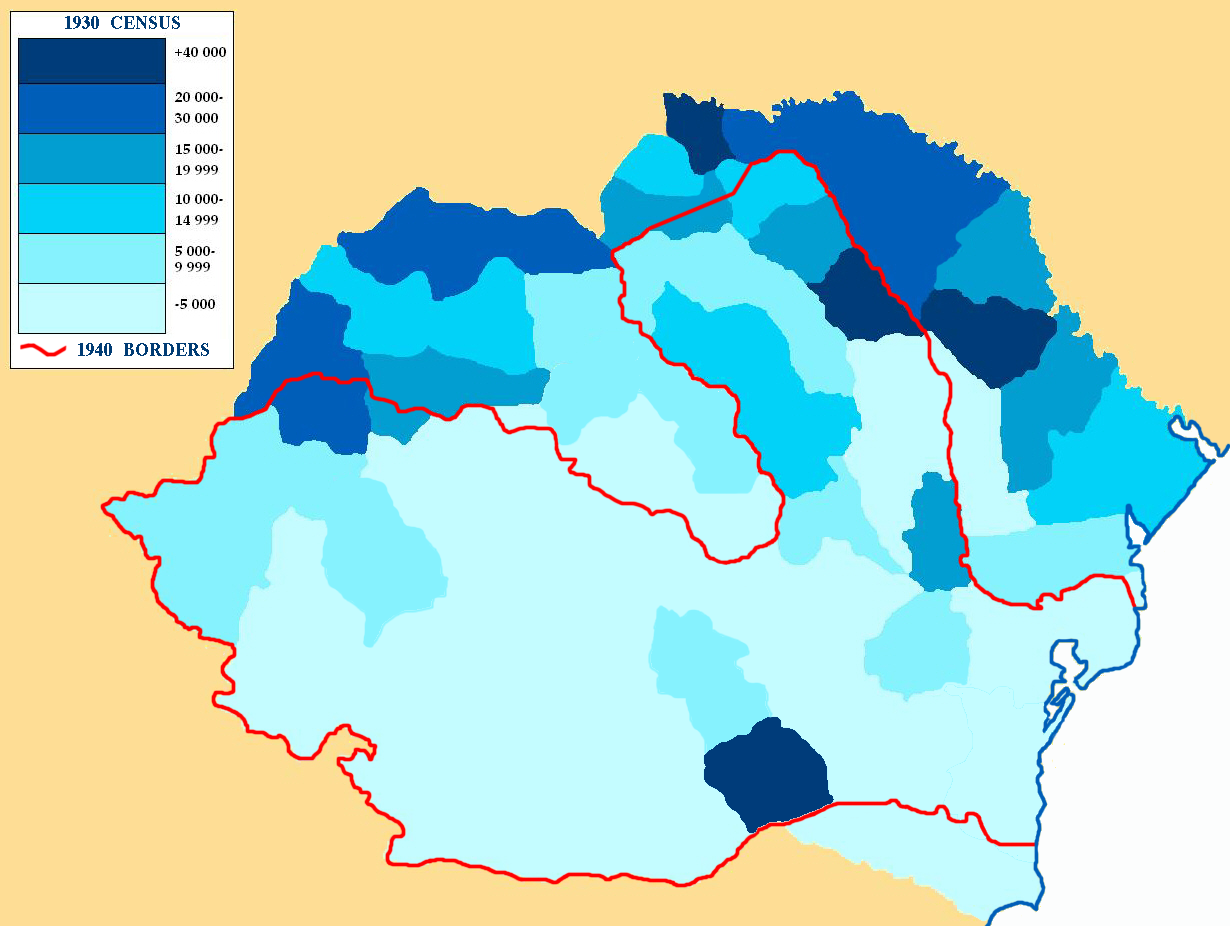
This map depicts the Jewish population in Romania by county, but it also shows how the Vienna Award split Bihor County (dark blue, West)

== Armaments industry ==
Demographic map of Romania according to the 1941 census; in the top-left corner the mini-map shows Southern Transylvania-proper (Transilvania de Sud)

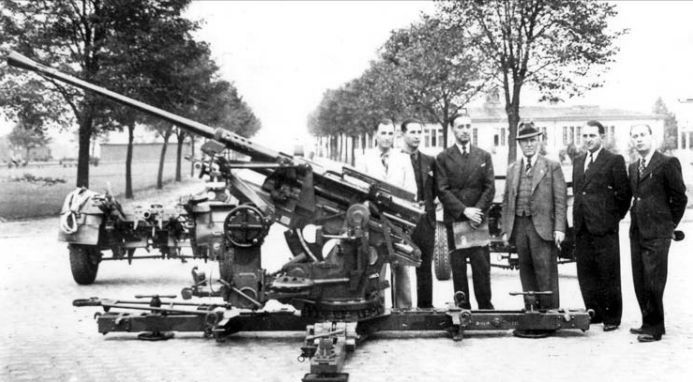
37 mm Astra anti-aircraft gun

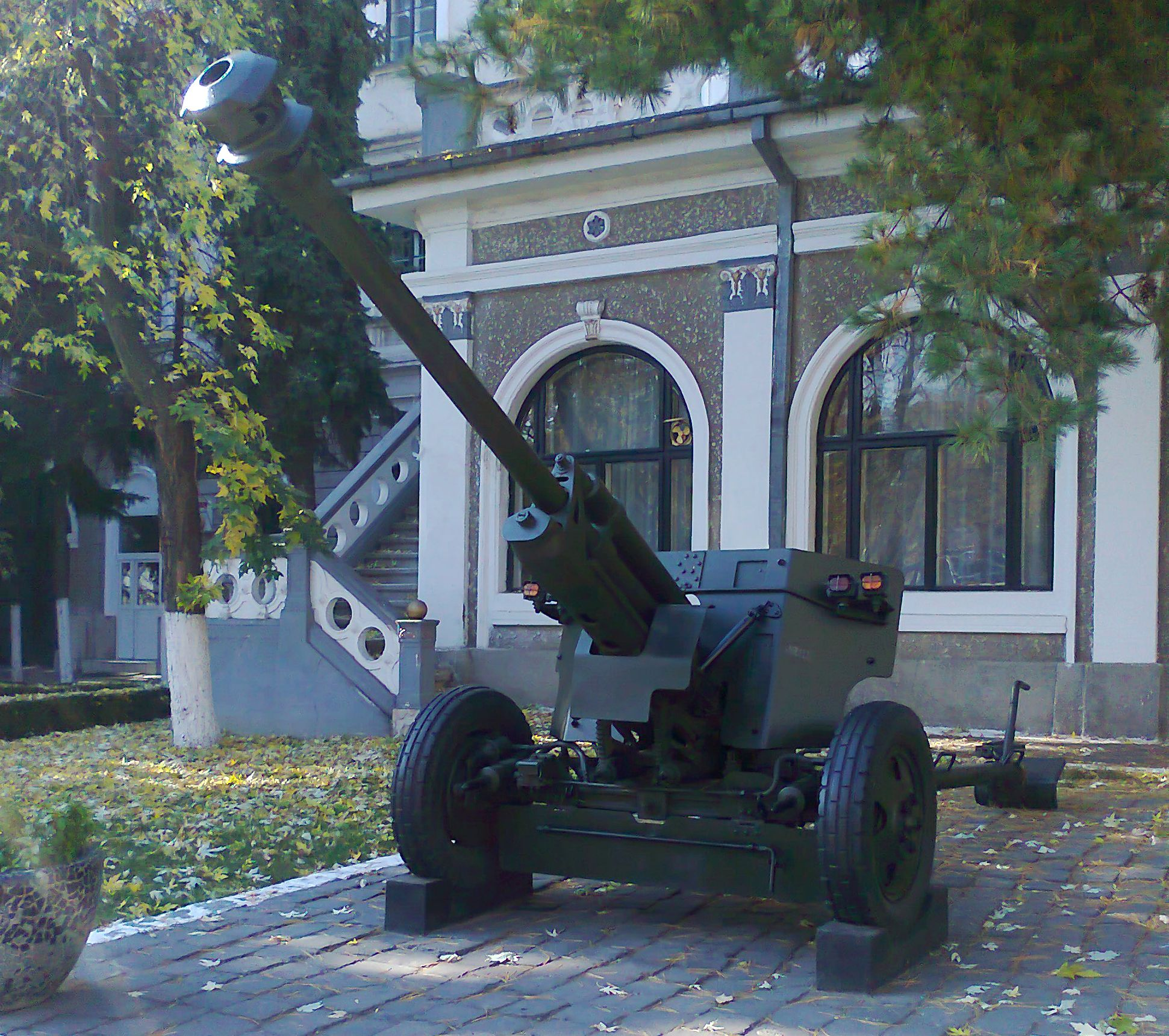
75 mm Reșița anti-tank gun

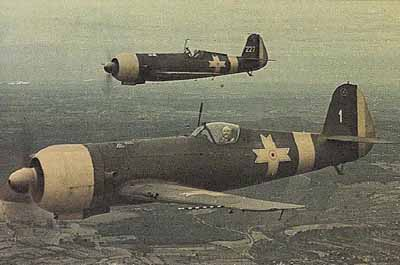
IAR-80 fighter aircraft

The following is a list of weapons produced during World War II and the years prior throughout the Romanian (Southern) part of Transylvania-proper.

=== Weapons ===
Vessel	Design/Licence Origin	Number	Notes
Submachine guns
Orița M1941	Romania	6000+	Local design, entered operational service with the Romanian Army in 1943 with a production rate of 666 pieces per month as of October 1942 (6,000 produced until October 1943)
Machine guns
ZB vz. 30	Czechoslovakia	10,000	10,000 licence-built locally at Cugir after Czechoslovak design, with a production rate of 250 pieces per month as of October 1942
Mortars
Brandt Mle 27/31	France	410+	Licence acquired from France to produce 410 mortars at the Voina Works in Brașov, but the number specified by the licence was far exceeded during the war, with a production rate of 30 pieces per month as of October 1942
Anti-aircraft guns
3.7 cm flak	Germany	360	360 produced under German licence at the Astra Works beginning with 1938, with 102 delivered by May 1941 and a production rate of 6 pieces per month as of October 1942
75 mm Vickers	United Kingdom	200	100 built under British licence acquired by the Reșița Works beginning with 1936, with 100 delivered by mid-1941 and then a second batch of 100 started in July 1941 outside the licence, the production rate being of 5 pieces per month as of October 1942; it appears that, although the licence was acquired by Reșița, the actual production took place at Astra
Anti-tank guns
75 mm Reșița	Romania	120	Native design combining features from several foreign models, a total of 120 pieces were produced at the Astra Works in Brașov

Transylvanian monthly armament production (October 1942)

Model	Production capacity	Actual production	Percentage of production capacity achieved
Orița M1941 submachine gun	1,080	666	62.35%
ZB vz. 30 machine gun	500	250	50%
Brandt 81 mm mortar	90	30	33.33%
Rheinmetall 37 mm AA gun	16	6	37.5%
Vickers 75 mm AA gun	8	5	62.50%

=== Aircraft (armed) ===
- IAR 80 (448 built)
- IAR 37 (220 built)
- IAR 79/SM.79 (67 built)
- Potez 25 (184 built)
- Messerschmitt Bf 109 (17 built)
- PZL P.11 (95 built)
- PZL P.24 (25 built)

=== Ammunition ===
There were factories for the assembly and filling of artillery shells at Orăștie, Avrig and Copșa Mică. The one at Avrig was the largest, accounting for up to 40% of the total Romanian production of artillery shells. In 1942, the Nitramonia plant in Făgăraș started producing explosives.

=== Armored fighting vehicle components ===
Two Transylvanian factories, Industria Sârmei in Turda and IAR in Brașov, along with one factory outside Transylvania (Concordia in Ploiești), were responsible for the production of the torsion bars and wheels used in the manufacturing of the TACAM T-60 tank destroyers. The Astra Works in Brașov, together with the Lemaitre Works in Bucharest, were responsible for the finishing of the gun carriages used by the TACAM T-60 tank destroyers (the carriages were designed and cast at Concordia). For Romania's Renault R35 tanks, IAR in Brașov finished the cylinder heads and drive shafts which were cast at the Basarab Works in Bucharest.

=== Artillery components ===
The Astra Works produced gun barrels for Romania's Skoda 150 mm and 100 mm howitzers.
