= Mogilev Ghetto =

Ghetto in Mogilev, German-occupied Belarus

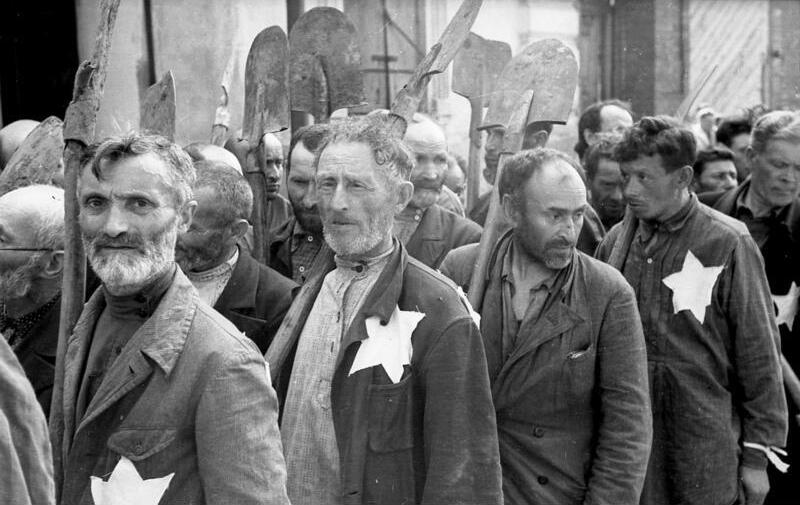
- Jewish slave labourers in the Mogilev Ghetto
- Location: Mogilev, Army Group Rear Area Command
- Date: 13 August 1941–1942; September 1941–September 1943
- Incident type: Imprisonment, forced labour
- Perpetrators: Einsatzgruppen; Einsatzkommando; Belarusian Auxiliary Police; Ukrainian Auxiliary Police
- Victims: 10,000-12,000

The Mogilev Ghetto (Belarusian: Магілёўская гета, romanized: Mahilioŭskaja hieta; Russian: Могилёвское гетто, romanized: Mogilyovskoye getto) was a Nazi ghetto in the city of Mogilev, in eastern Belarus, during World War II. Established shortly following the German victory in the Siege of Mogilev, around 10,000 Jews (51 percent of a pre-war population of 19,715) were killed by the Nazis and collaborationist forces by the time it was abolished in 1943.

== Background ==
Located in northeastern Belarus, the city of Mogilev was an early target of Nazi Germany's 1941 Operation Barbarossa, which began the Eastern Front of World War II. Mogilev's position placed its Jewish community, numbering at 19,715 in 1939, in a relatively advantageous position compared to Jews in other cities throughout Belarus, and prior to the occupation an unknown number of Jews were able to escape eastwards.

On 26 July 1941, Mogilev was occupied by German troops following the Siege of Mogilev. Power over the city was shared between a local and occupational Kommandantur, the former named Krantz and the latter Jaschwitz. Immediately following the beginning of the occupation, measures were taken to separate the Jewish population from others; a curfew of 17:00 was imposed, Jews were required to wear yellow badges on their chests and backs, and they were additionally forbidden to walk on sidewalks or interact with non-Jews. Likewise, non-Jews were forbidden from interacting with Jews; in particular, they were forbidden from giving food. Jewish citizens of Mogilev were assigned to tasks of hard labour.

Beginning in August 1941, a population register was established in Mogilev. The city's local Judenrat played a significant role in these events, establishing a four-man "Jewish committee", which acquired statistics on the city's Jewish population. The register recorded 6,437 Jews. However, it is likely that these figures do not reflect the true situation of Mogilev's Jewish population; amidst the siege, many Jews abandoned their homes, but remained in the city. Others went underground, not wishing to fall into German hands.

== Establishment ==
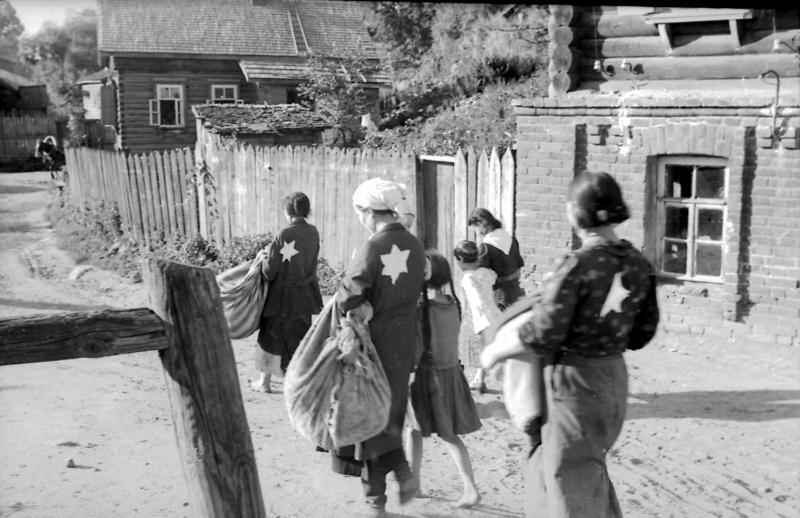
Jews being deported to the Mogilev Ghetto, 1941

Executions of Jews also began immediately following Mogilev's occupation. The first executions were among those from "Category One", active opponents of Nazism and those regarded as possible organisers of a resistance. In August 1941, the Einsatzgruppen and Sicherheitsdienst executed 80 Jews from among "Category One". The next category, "Category Two", consisted of the remainder of Mogilev's Jews, who were then sent to the ghetto.

On 13 August 1941, the Mogilev Ghetto was established. The edict establishing the ghetto, written by Felzin, the city's German-installed mayor, said, "By order of the commander of the city of Mogilev, all persons of Jewish nationality of both sexes have the obligation within 24 hours to leave the city limits and move to the ghetto area. People who do not comply with this order within the given time will be taken away by force by the police and their property will be confiscated." During the relocation process, Jews were paraded through the central Gradzhanskaya Street. In addition to those from the city of Mogilev, Jews from the neighbouring villages of Varatynščyna and Kniažycy were included in the ghetto.

One month after the ghetto's establishment, it was moved from its original location in Mogilev's "Podnikol" area to an area on the banks of the Dubaravienka river, as decided by mayor Felzin. The transfer of the ghetto's inhabitants likely took place on 30 September 1941. The matter of recouping monetary costs was placed on the city Judenrat, with the local German government demanding 50,000 rubles within 24 hours. Another 108 Jews were taken from the village of Sialiec to the ghetto.

The ghetto's territory was kept under the guard of the Belarusian Auxiliary Police. According to the plans of the German occupational administration, a wire fence was to temporarily separate the ghetto from the rest of Mogilev before a wooden fence could be erected, as well as a sign indicating that the entrance of non-Jews to the ghetto was prohibited. In addition to the Dubaravienka site, additional holding areas for Jews existed in a field near what is now the Mogilev Hotel and the Strommašyna mechanical factory. The former site served as a killing field, while the latter held long-term internees. In accordance with the demands of the occupational government, fifteen men were recruited by the Mogilev judenrat as members of the Jewish Ghetto Police.

== Conditions ==
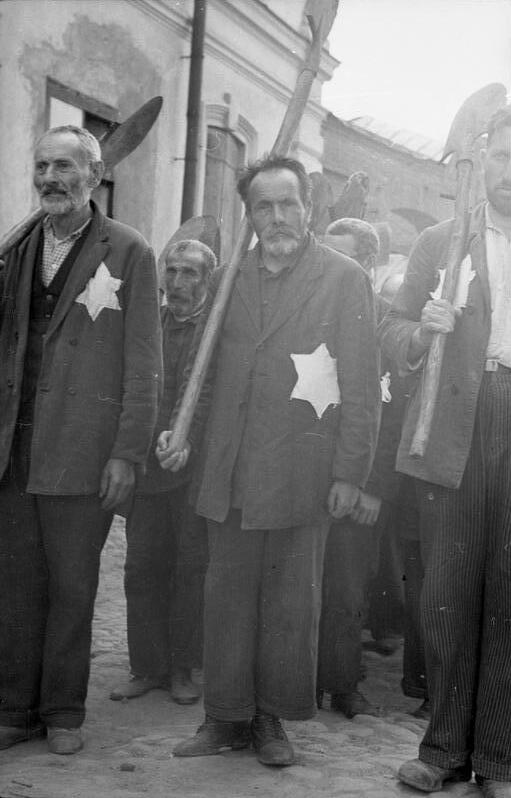
Jewish slave labourers in Mogilev, July 1941

Much like other Nazi ghettos, conditions in the Mogilev Ghetto painted a stark picture of Nazi cruelty towards Jews. Each house in the ghetto was inhabited by 40-60 individuals, who were not provided with food. All able-bodied ghetto inhabitants became slave labourers. Abuses against Jews were rampant, with young Jews being beaten indiscriminately and older Jews having their facial hair shaved. Arbitrary executions also continued unabated; 337 Jewish women were killed for "impudence". Additional killings included two who were accused of not wearing their yellow badges, two accused of being NKVD agents, three found to possess explosives, four for refusing to work, and eight for "incitement and propaganda."

== Liquidation of the Dubaravienka ghetto ==
In October 1941, only one month after the ghetto's move to Dubaravienka, the process of liquidation began. That month, two massacres were committed by occupational forces. The first, including the Einsatzkommando, Ukrainian Auxiliary Police, and police detachments, led to the deaths of 2,273 Jews. Sixty-five were executed on 2 October 1941 in the confines of the ghetto, while the remaining 2,208 were moved to Strommašyna before being shot to death in Mogilev's Jewish cemetery the next day. The second massacre, also involving the Einsatzkommando and Ukrainian Auxiliary Police, was the slaughter of 3,726 Jews near the villages of Kazimiraŭka and Novaje Paškava on 19 October.

In August 1941 or the winter of 1942, another massacre of ghetto inmates occurred in the village of Palykavičy, with the number of victims at approximately 4,800. Over the course of several days, ghetto inhabitants were killed and dumped in a nearby ravine, along with people who had been killed in gas vans.

== The ghetto at Strommašyna ==
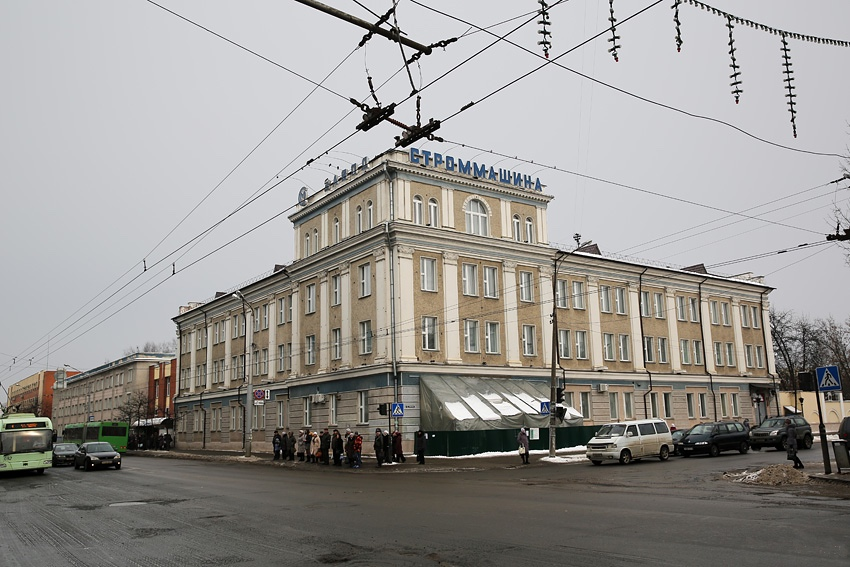
Strommašyna (pictured here in 2011) was the site of a second ghetto in Mogilev

After the liquidation of the ghetto, the remaining 1,000-1,500 Jews were sent to Strommašyna, where they were used as forced labour. Food rations were scarce, with 150–200 g (5.3–7.1 oz) supplied in the morning and soup made from the meat of dead horses, dogs, and cats in the evenings. Every Sunday, Jews were "selected" for the "Gimel Team" – a euphemistic phrase used by German authorities to indicate those being executed. The lack of food, combined with harsh measures, led to the deaths of 15-20 prisoners daily.

Following a visit by Heinrich Himmler on 23 October 1941, the ghetto was expanded. In December 1941, 180 prisoners were shot for "instigation." At the same time, another 135 were rounded up and shot for not wearing yellow badges or having proper identification. On 26 May 1942 roughly 400 Jews were deported from Slonim to Mogilev, where they were interned at Strommašyna. Massacres continued, with an increasing number of deaths; at some point in 1942, 4,000 Jews were killed in a singular act.

According to intelligence collected by the Belarusian partisans, 500 people (including 276 Jews) remained interned at Strommašyna by September 1943. The remaining Jews were sent to Minsk, from which they were transferred to Majdanek concentration camp.

In total, according to Yad Vashem, 10,000 Jews were killed in the Mogilev Ghetto during the war.

== Resistance ==
The Jews of Mogilev actively resisted the city's occupation and their ghettoisation. A common form of resistance was hiding outside the ghetto, for which four were executed and 510 were detained. They also joined the Belarusian partisans, typically working in intelligence. S. E. Fayntzayg worked under the pseudonym of M. G. Leonova in the German military hospital, collecting intelligence for partisans. An underground partisan organisation also existed at Strommašyna, facilitating the escape of 73 Jews to the partisans.

== Memorialisation ==
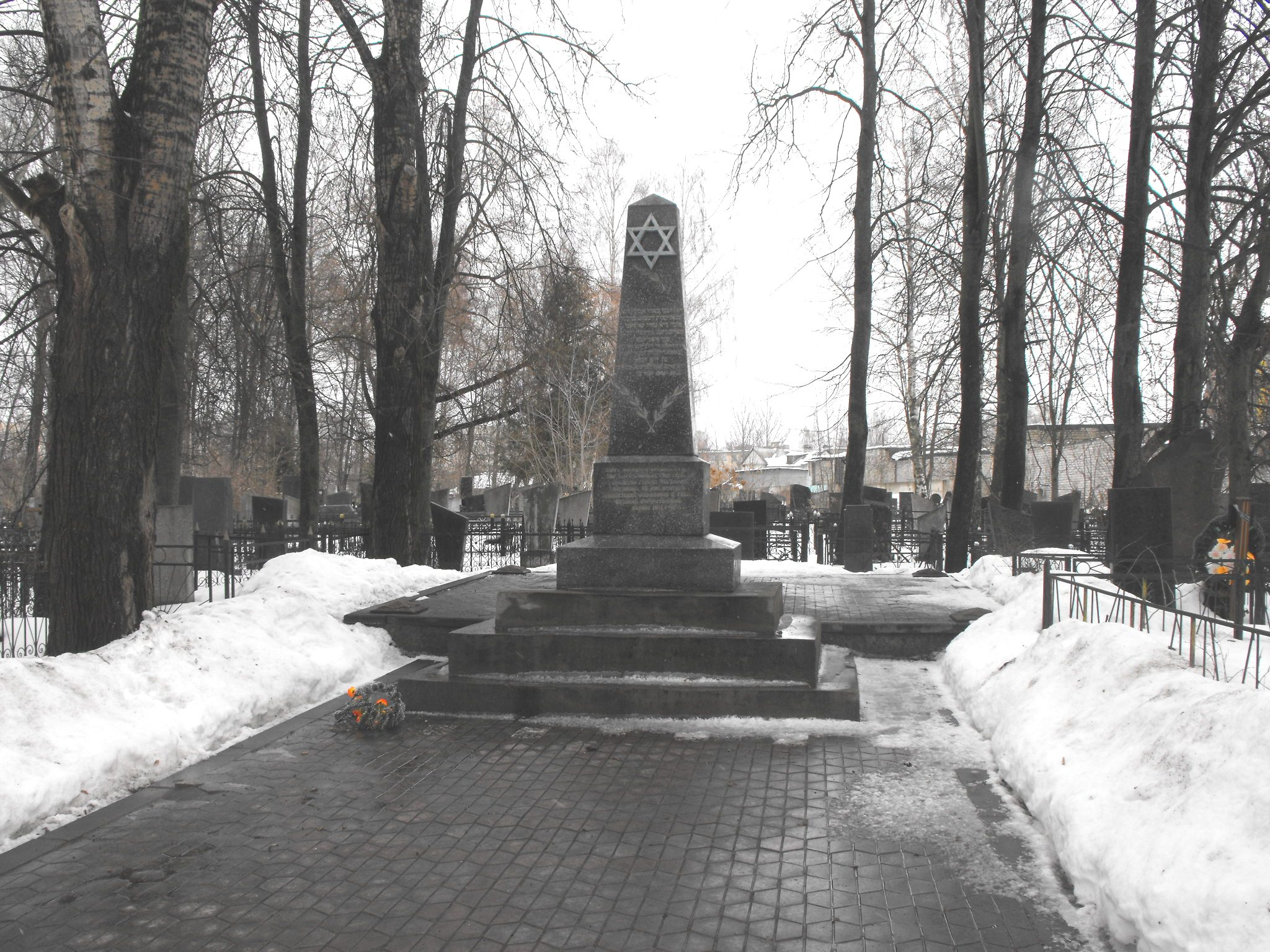
Monument to murdered ghetto inmates, Mogilev Jewish cemetery

Since the end of the war, most of Mogilev's murdered Jews have been buried with marked graves. A monument exists in Mogilev's Jewish cemetery which names 2,000 dead "Soviet citizens" without mentioning their ethnicity. In other villages where massacres took place, general monuments to "Soviet citizens" exist, though there are no graves for individual victims.
