= László Endre =

Hungarian politician

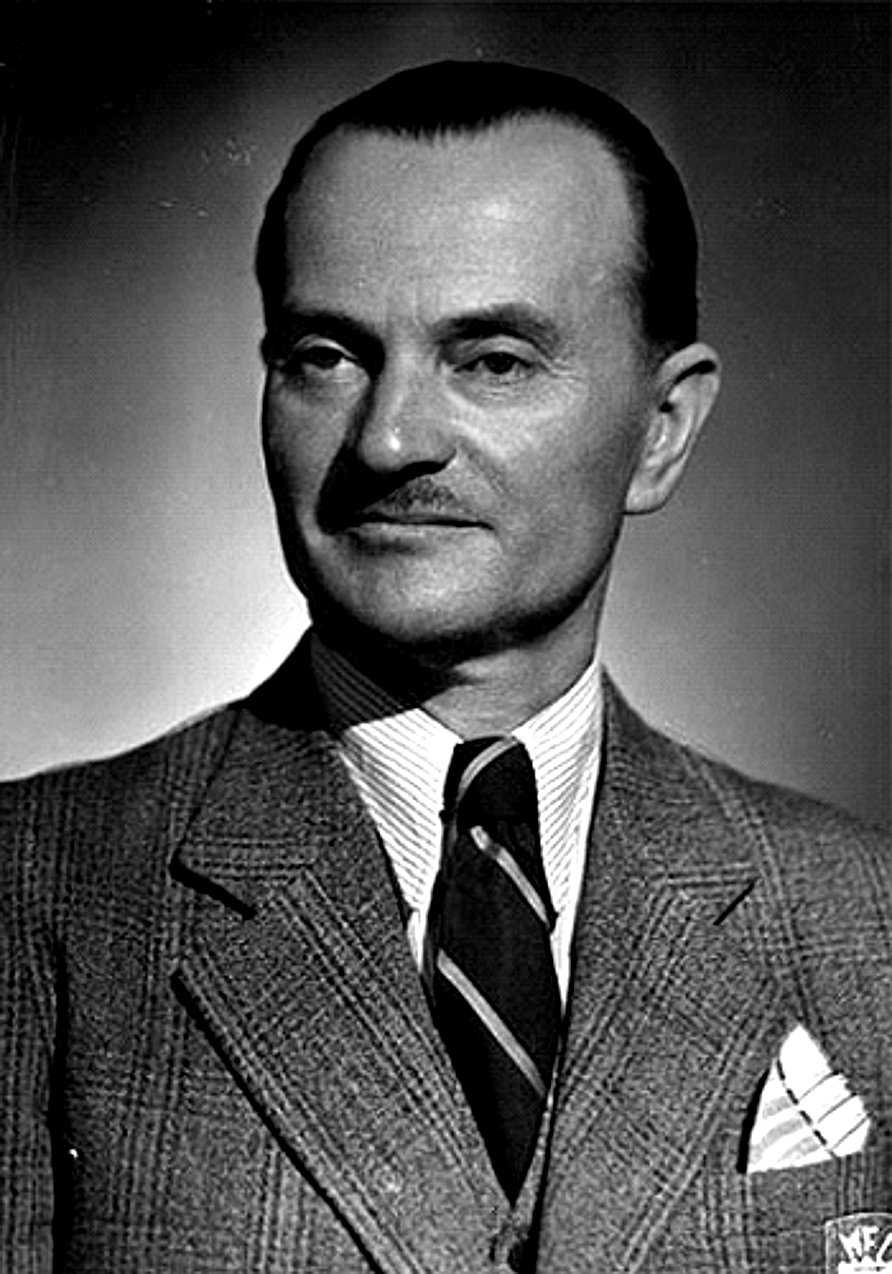
- László Endre as sub-prefect of Pest-Pilis-Solt-Kiskun County
- Born: László Endre; January 1, 1895; Abony, Austria-Hungary
- Died: March 29, 1946 (aged 51); Budapest, Hungary
- Cause of death: Execution by hanging
- Citizenship: Hungarian
- Known for: Politician and Nazi collaborator
- Title: State Secretary in the Ministry of the Interior
- Term: 1944
- Political party: Magyar Országos Véderő Egyesület, Hungarian National Socialist Party

László Endre (January 1, 1895 – March 29, 1946) was a Hungarian right-wing politician and collaborator with the Nazis during the Second World War.

== Early years ==
Born into a wealthy Abony family, Endre obtained a degree in political science after service in the First World War and became a leading local government officer in Pest county. He became involved in the right wing nationalist society Magyar Országos Véderő Egyesület (MOVE) during which he became noted for his extreme cruelty, which may have been a result of syphilis. He also became a member of various incarnations of the Hungarian National Socialist Party and even led his own minor movements on occasion.

In 1938, he joined the governing party of Béla Imrédy and became noted for his antisemitism. Endre argued that the Hungarian government's anti-Jewish laws were not harsh enough, and on his own initiative he imposed further restrictions on Jewish life, such as banning Jews from beaches and spas, and excluding Jewish vendors from fairs. These restrictions were later reversed by the Interior Ministry.

== Ministry of the Interior ==
Endre did not rise to national prominence until 1944, when Hitler, impatient with Hungary's reluctance to commit fully to German war effort, ordered the invasion and occupation of Hungary. The Nazi occupiers dissolved the tolerant government of Prime Minister Miklós Kállay, and forced the Hungarian regent Miklós Horthy to replace Kállay with the Nazi sympathizer Döme Sztójay.

A top priority for the country's new Nazi rulers was the annihilation of Hungary's Jewish population, which despite repression and economic hardships had survived the first years of the war largely intact. Endre, who in anti-Semitic circles was considered a "Jewish expert," was appointed state secretary in the Ministry of the Interior in the Nazi-controlled government under Interior Minister Andor Jaross. He was given far-reaching powers to ghettoize and deport the country's Jewish population. Along with László Baky, Endre and Jaross eagerly helped Adolf Eichmann amass and deport more than 400,000 Hungarian Jews between May and July 1944. Most of them were taken directly to Auschwitz concentration camp, where they were quickly murdered in the gas chambers, and cremated. Hungarian Jews murdered at Auschwitz in the spring of 1944 account for almost one half of all Jews killed in the camp; it was with those deaths that Auschwitz-Birkenau took its place at the head of the grim list of Nazi killing centres.

== Removal and return ==
Endre's excesses attracted the attention of regent Miklós Horthy, who as early as June called for his removal from the Interior Ministry; in July, Horthy finally succeeded in bringing the deportations to a halt.

Endre was removed from power in September of the same year; but he returned to government within a month when the Nazis deposed and arrested Horthy, and placed Ferenc Szálasi's ultra-fascist Arrow Cross Party in power; Endre served as Commissioner of Civil Administration. In March 1945, after Budapest fell to the Red Army, he fled to Austria, but was captured and returned to his homeland.

== Trial and execution ==
In December 1945 Endre, Baky and Jaross (now known as "the deportation trio") were tried in Budapest and found guilty of the murder of Jews, and of acting against the national interests of Hungary. All three were executed (as were no fewer than four of Hungary's wartime prime ministers, including Béla Imrédy and Ferenc Szálasi). Endre was hanged by way of the Austro-Hungarian pole method on March 29, 1946.
