= Mogilev =

City in Mogilev Region, Belarus

Mogilev Магілёў (Belarusian) Могилёв (Russian) Mahilyow
- City

Belarusian transcription(s)
  - BGN/PCGN: Mahilyow
  - Official: Mahilioŭ
  - Scholarly: Mahilëŭ
  - ALA-LC: Mahili͡oŭ
  - British: Mahilëw
  - Łacinka: Mahiloŭ
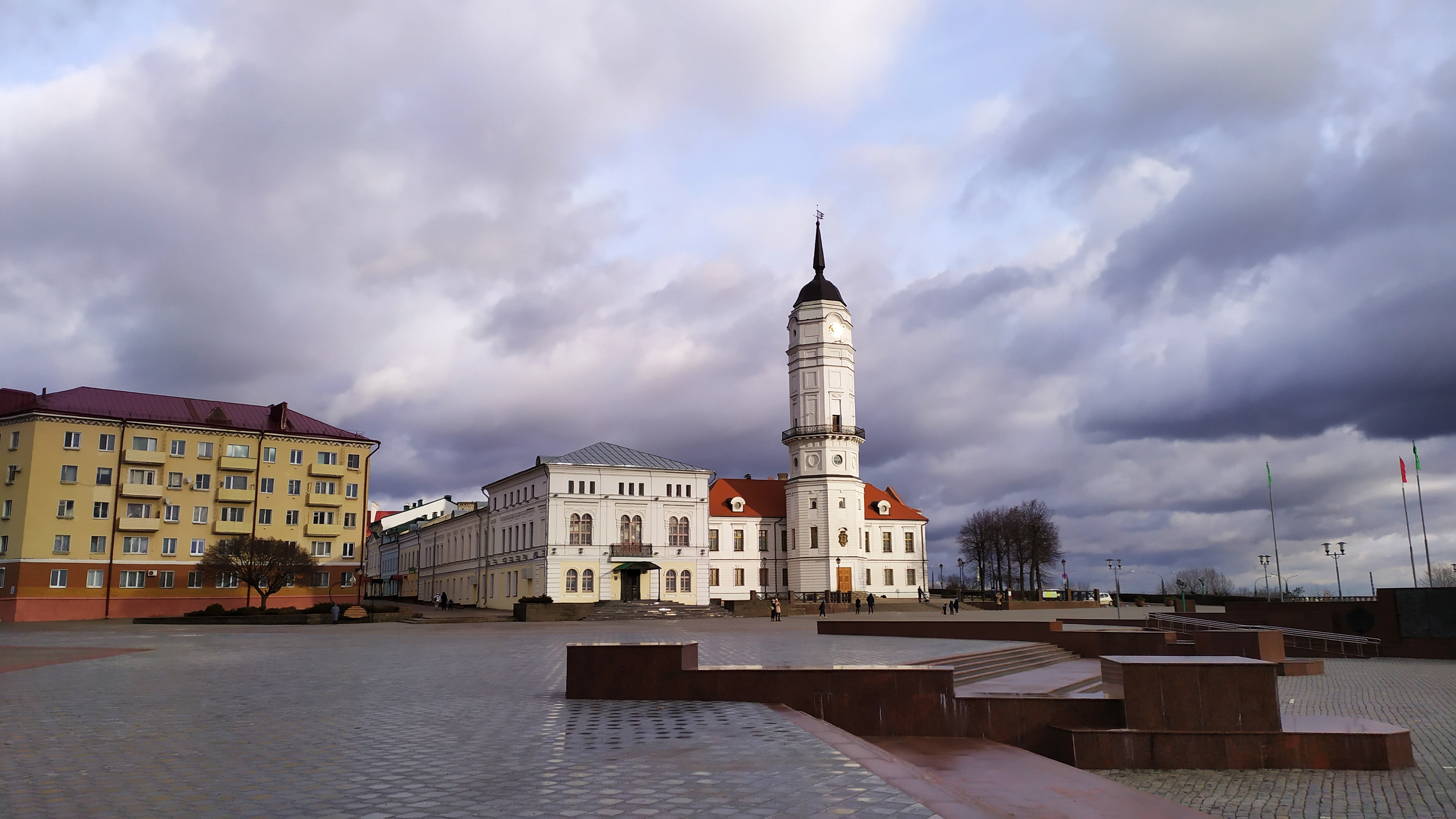
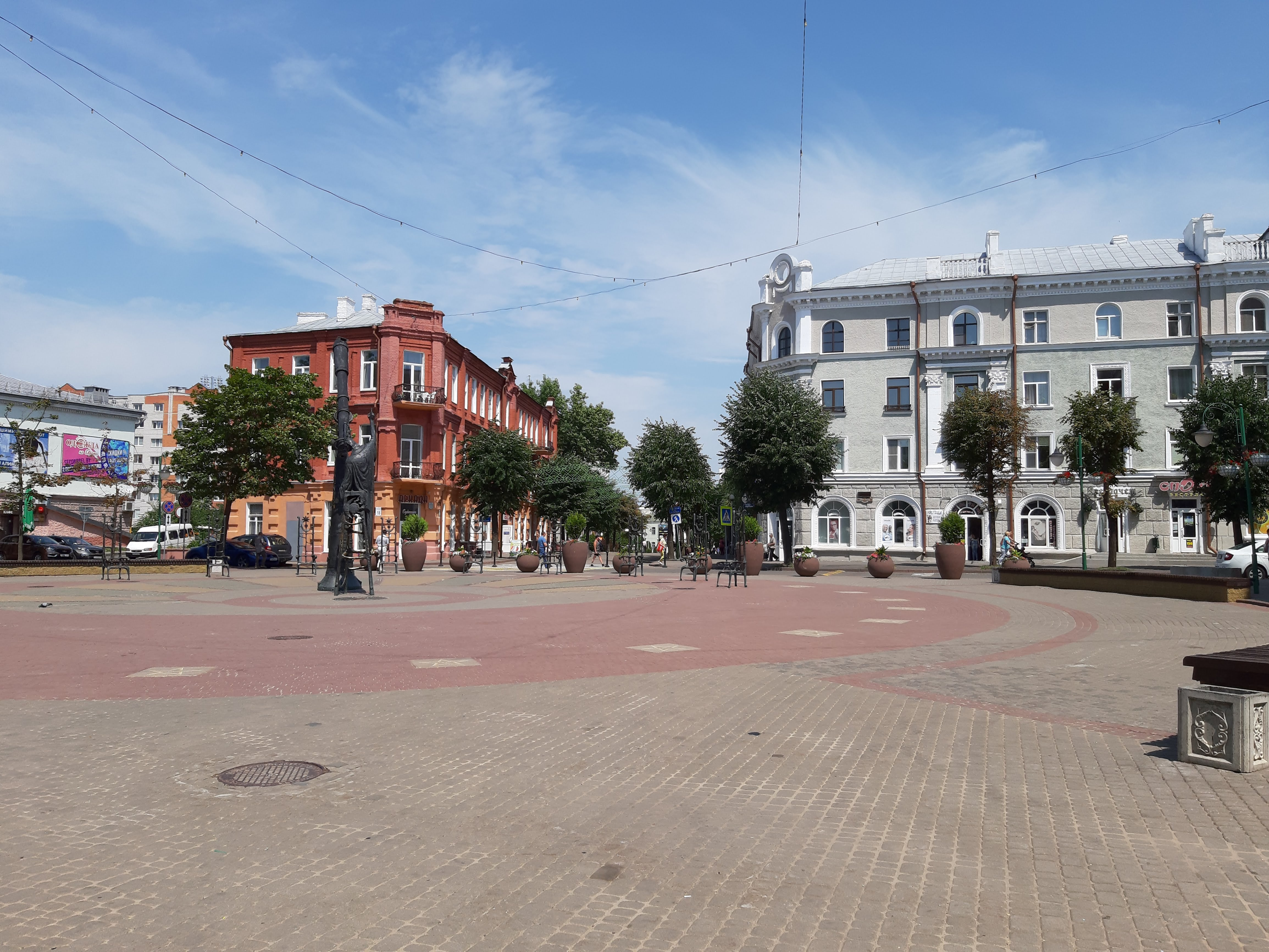
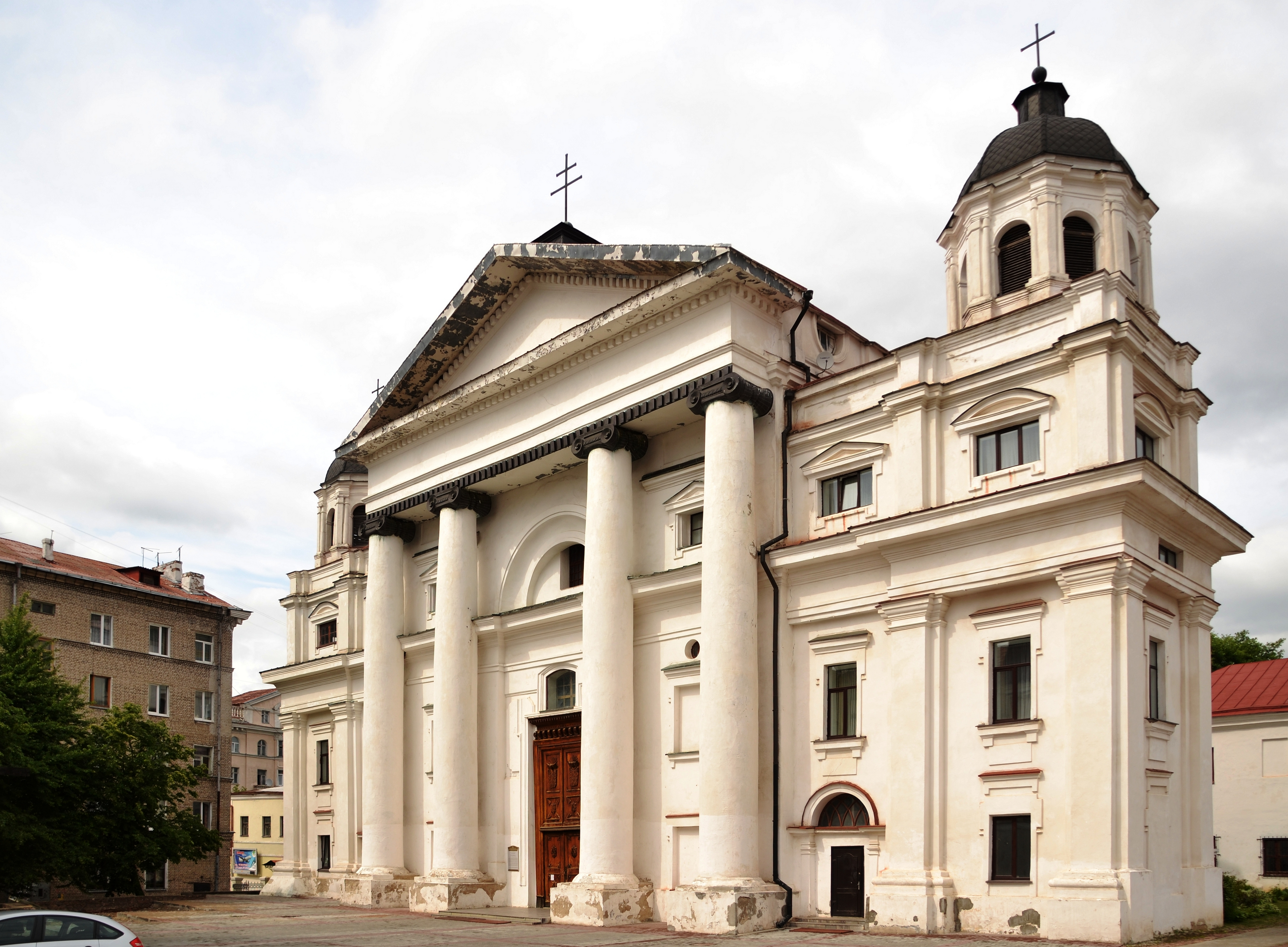
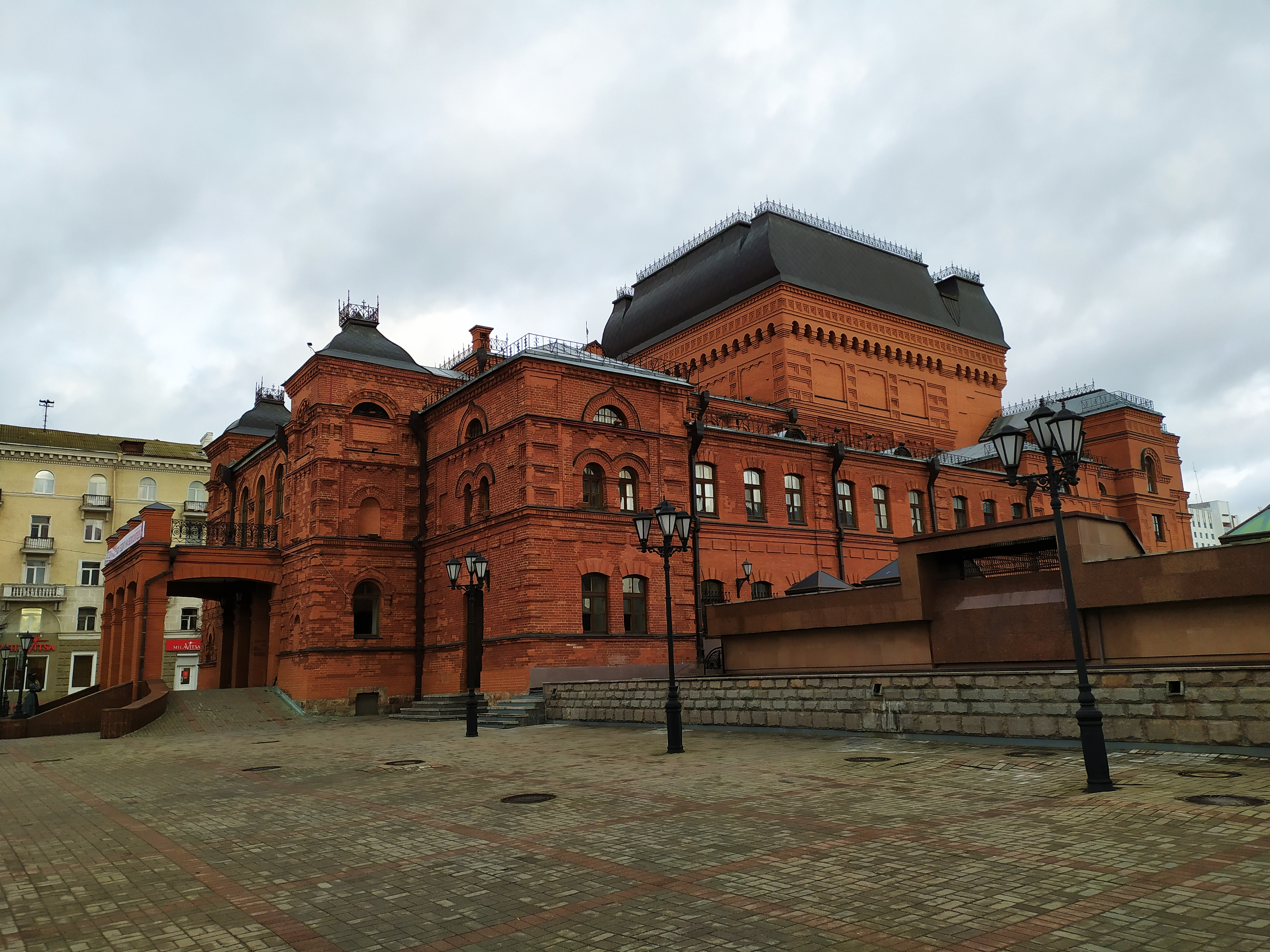
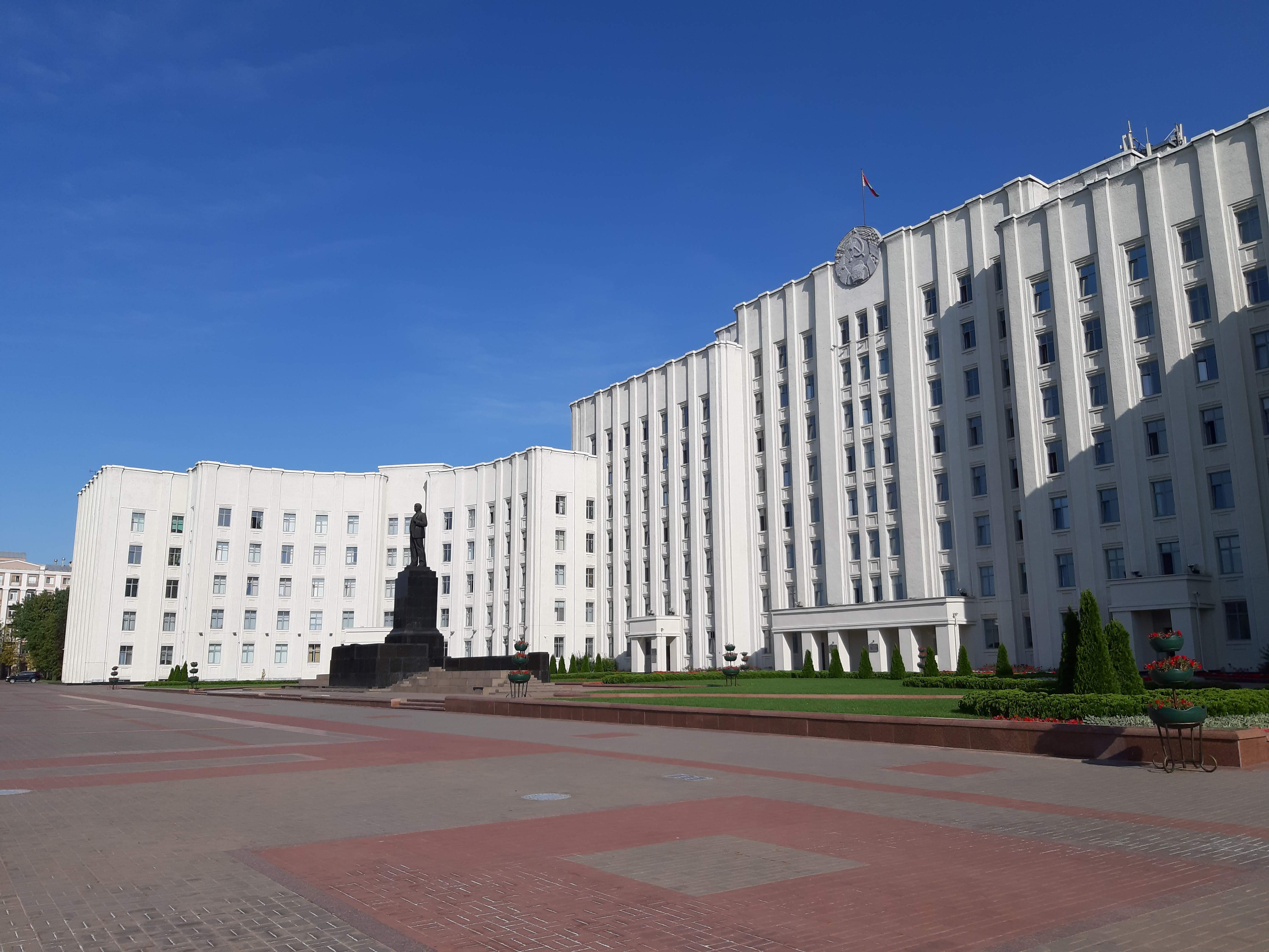
- Slavy Square and City Hall Zorak Square Catholic Cathedral Regional Drama Theater Mogilev City Council

- Flag Coat of arms
- Interactive map of Mogilev
- Location within Belarus
- Coordinates: 53°55′N 30°21′E
- Country: Belarus
- Region: Mogilev Region
- Founded: 1267

Government
  - Mayor: Sergey Chertkov

Area
  - Total: 118.50 km^{2} (45.75 sq mi)
- Elevation: 192 m (630 ft)

Population (2025)
  - Total: 352,896
  - Density: 2,978.0/km^{2} (7,713.1/sq mi)
- Time zone: UTC+3 (MSK)
- Postal code: 212 001
- Area code: +375 222
- License plate: 6
- Website: City's executive committee's official website

Mogilev, or Mahilyow, (Note: US: /məɡɪlˈjɔːf/; Russian: Могилёв, romanized: Mogilyov, IPA: [məɡʲɪˈlʲɵf]; Belarusian: Магілёў, romanized: Mahilioŭ, IPA: [maɣʲiˈlʲou̯].) is a city in eastern Belarus. It is located on the Dnieper River, about 76 kilometres (47 miles) from the border with Russia's Smolensk Oblast and 105 km (65 miles) from Bryansk Oblast. As of 2025, it has a population of 352,896. In 2011, its population was 360,918, up from an estimated 106,000 in 1956. It serves as the administrative centre of Mogilev Region, and is the third-largest city in Belarus.

== Name ==
The name Mogilev may be derived from Russian mogila (lit. 'grave') and lev (lit. 'lion'); according to folk legend, the city was named after the grave of a young peasant, which was known as the "Tomb of the Lion", and it was around this burial mound that a fortress was built. Its founding has also been linked to Galician prince Leo I.

== History ==
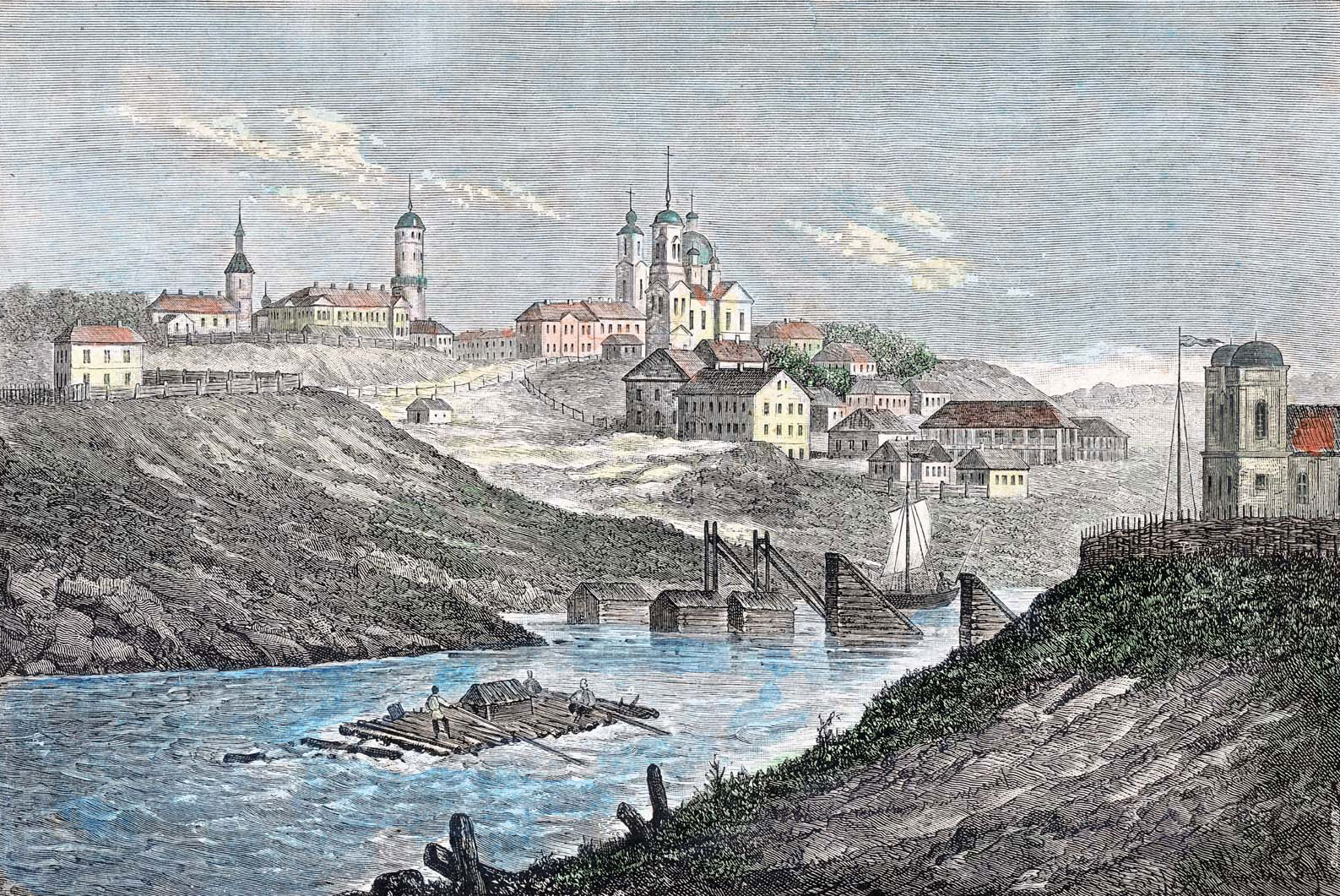
19th-century view of the city

The city was first mentioned in historical records in 1267. From the 14th century, it was part of the Grand Duchy of Lithuania, and since the Union of Lublin (1569), it has been part of the Polish–Lithuanian Commonwealth, where it became known as Mohylew. In the 16th and 17th centuries, the city flourished as one of the main nodes of the east–west and north–south trading routes.

In 1577, Grand Duke Stephen Báthory granted it city rights under Magdeburg law. In 1654, during the Russo-Polish War (1654–1667), the townsmen negotiated a treaty of surrender to the Russians peacefully, if the Jews were to be expelled and their property divided up among Mogilev's inhabitants. Tsar Aleksei Mikhailovitch agreed to their proposal. However, instead of expelling the Jews, the Russian troops massacred them after they had led them to the outskirts of the town. During this war, the city was besieged twice by the Lithuanian army: in 1655, and in 1660. In 1661, residents started an uprising against the Russian military occupation. The city was set afire by Peter the Great's forces in 1708, during the Great Northern War. After the First Partition of Poland in 1772, Mogilev became part of the Russian Empire and became the centre of the Mogilev Governorate.

In the years 1915–1917, during World War I, the Stavka, the headquarters of the Russian Imperial Army, was based in the city and the Tsar, Nicholas II, spent long periods there as Commander-in-Chief.

Following the Russian Revolution, in 1918, the city was briefly occupied by Germany and placed under their short-lived Belarusian People's Republic. In 1919, Mogilev was captured by the forces of Soviet Russia and incorporated into the Byelorussian SSR. Up to World War II and the Holocaust, like many other cities in Europe, Mogilev had a significant Jewish population: according to the Russian census of 1897, out of the total population of 41,100, 21,500 were Jews (i.e. over 50 percent). In 1938 the leadership of Soviet Belarus decided to move the capital of the country from Minsk to Mogilev because Minsk was too close to the then-Polish-Soviet border. Due to that, the now-Mogilev City Council building was built in 1938–1940 to be the government building. It was designed to resemble the Minsk Government building.

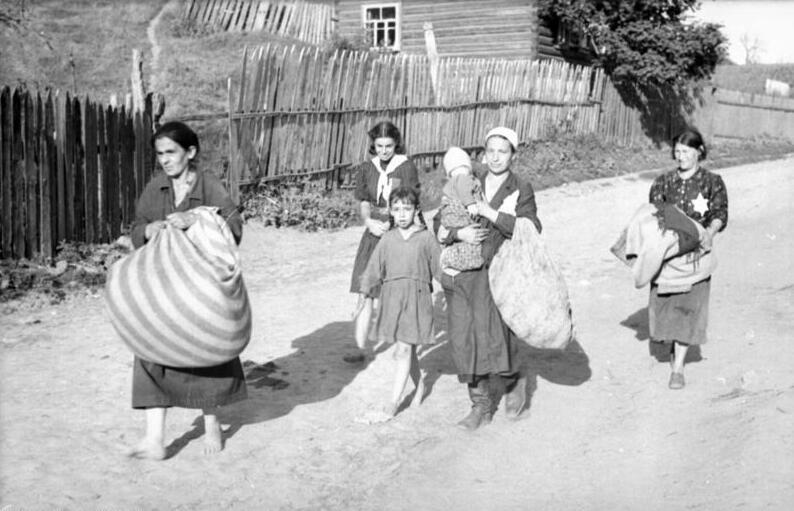
Wehrmacht propaganda photograph of Jewish women in Mogilev, July 1941; Mogilev Jews were murdered by Nazi Police Battalion 322 in October.

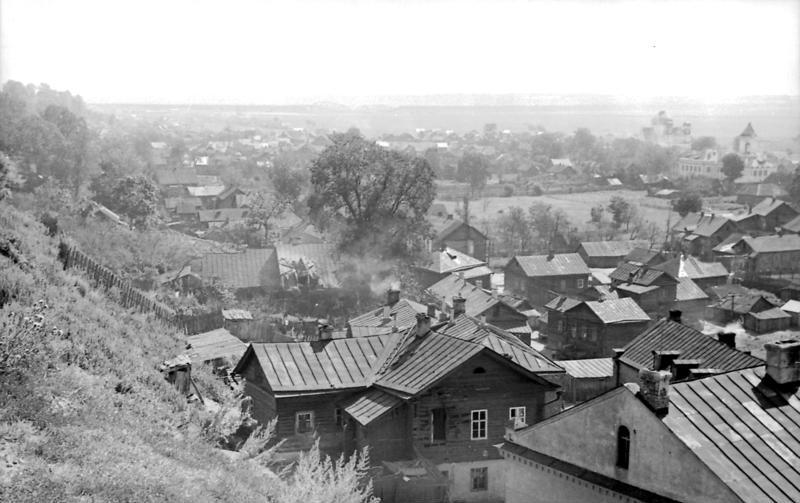
Mogilev in July 1941

During Operation Barbarossa, the city was conquered by Wehrmacht forces on 26 July 1941 and remained under German occupation until 28 June 1944. Mogilev became the official residence of High SS and police leader (HSSPF) Erich von dem Bach. During that period, the Jews of Mogilev were ghettoized and systematically murdered by Ordnungspolizei and SS personnel. Heinrich Himmler personally witnessed the executions of 279 Jews on 23 October 1941. Later that month, several mentally disabled patients were poisoned with car exhaust fumes as an experiment; the method of killing was thereafter applied in several Nazi extermination camps. Initial plans for establishing a death camp in Mogilev were abandoned in favour of Maly Trostenets.

In 1944, with the Mogilev offensive, the devastated city was liberated by the Red Army and returned to Soviet control. Mogilev then was the site of a labour camp for German POW soldiers.

Since Belarus gained its independence in 1991, Mogilev has remained one of its principal cities.

== Demographics ==
Historical population

Year	Pop.	±%
1897	43,119	—
1923	41,622	−3.5%
1926	46,562	+11.9%
1939	99,428	+113.5%
1959	121,712	+22.4%
1970	202,314	+66.2%
1979	290,361	+43.5%

Year	Pop.	±%
1989	359,188	+23.7%
1999	356,500	−0.7%
2009	358,279	+0.5%
2019	356,821	−0.4%
2024	353,110	−1.0%
2025	352,896	−0.1%

Source: pop-stat.mashke.org

== Religion ==
Mohilev was the episcopal see of the Latin Catholic Archdiocese of Mohilev until its 1991 merger into the Roman Catholic Archdiocese of Minsk-Mohilev.

It remains the see of the Eparchy (Eastern diocese) of Mogilev and Mstsislaw in the Belarusian Exarchate of the Russian Orthodox Church.

== Economy ==
After World War II, a huge metallurgy centre with several major steel mills was built. Also, several major factories of cranes, cars, tractors and a chemical plant were established. By the 1950s, tanning was Mogilev's principal industry, and it was a major trading centre for cereal, leather, salt, sugar, fish, timber and flint: the city has been home to a major inland port on the Dnieper river since and an airport since. Since the fall of the Soviet Union and the establishment of Belarus as an independent country, Mogilev has become one of that country's main economic and industrial centres.

== Notable sites ==
The convent of St. Nicholas has a cathedral built in 1668, as well as the original iconostasis, bell tower, walls, and gates. As of 2014 it was under consideration to become a UNESCO World Heritage site.

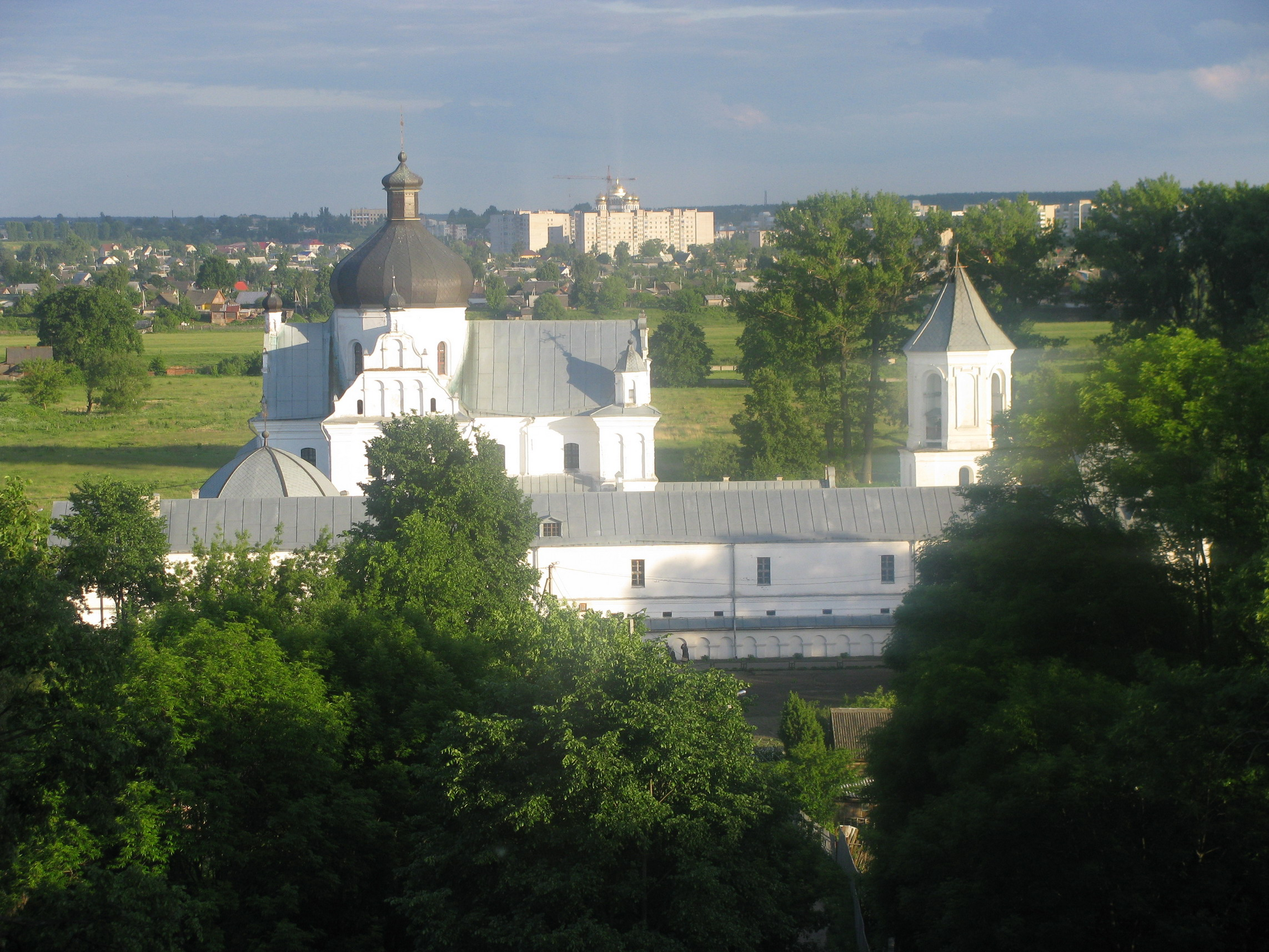
The Convent of St. Nicholas

== Geography ==
=== Climate ===
Mogilev has a warm-summer humid continental climate (Köppen climate classification Dfb) with warm summers and cold winters.

Climate data for Mogilev
Month	Jan	Feb	Mar	Apr	May	Jun	Jul	Aug	Sep	Oct	Nov	Dec	Year
Record high °C (°F)	9.8 (49.6)	12.9 (55.2)	19.3 (66.7)	29.1 (84.4)	30.8 (87.4)	32.6 (90.7)	34.3 (93.7)	36.8 (98.2)	30.6 (87.1)	25.5 (77.9)	14.5 (58.1)	10.9 (51.6)	36.8 (98.2)
Mean daily maximum °C (°F)	−3.0 (26.6)	−2.5 (27.5)	3.0 (37.4)	12.0 (53.6)	18.6 (65.5)	21.5 (70.7)	23.6 (74.5)	22.7 (72.9)	16.7 (62.1)	9.9 (49.8)	2.3 (36.1)	−2.0 (28.4)	10.2 (50.4)
Daily mean °C (°F)	−5.3 (22.5)	−5.5 (22.1)	−0.8 (30.6)	6.7 (44.1)	12.9 (55.2)	16.1 (61.0)	18.1 (64.6)	17.0 (62.6)	11.6 (52.9)	6.0 (42.8)	−0.1 (31.8)	−4.2 (24.4)	6.0 (42.8)
Mean daily minimum °C (°F)	−7.8 (18.0)	−8.5 (16.7)	−4.2 (24.4)	2.0 (35.6)	7.3 (45.1)	10.8 (51.4)	12.7 (54.9)	11.6 (52.9)	7.1 (44.8)	2.6 (36.7)	−2.3 (27.9)	−6.6 (20.1)	2.1 (35.8)
Record low °C (°F)	−37.3 (−35.1)	−34.7 (−30.5)	−35.0 (−31.0)	−17.7 (0.1)	−4.4 (24.1)	−0.7 (30.7)	3.0 (37.4)	0.9 (33.6)	−4.8 (23.4)	−14.8 (5.4)	−23.5 (−10.3)	−33.4 (−28.1)	−37.3 (−35.1)
Average precipitation mm (inches)	39 (1.5)	34 (1.3)	39 (1.5)	41 (1.6)	53 (2.1)	75 (3.0)	81 (3.2)	65 (2.6)	55 (2.2)	54 (2.1)	45 (1.8)	41 (1.6)	622 (24.5)
Average rainy days	8	7	9	12	15	17	15	13	14	15	14	10	149
Average snowy days	21	20	13	4	0.2	0	0	0	0.1	3	12	20	93
Average relative humidity (%)	87	85	80	72	69	74	74	75	80	84	89	89	80
Source: Pogoda.ru.net

== Notable citizens ==
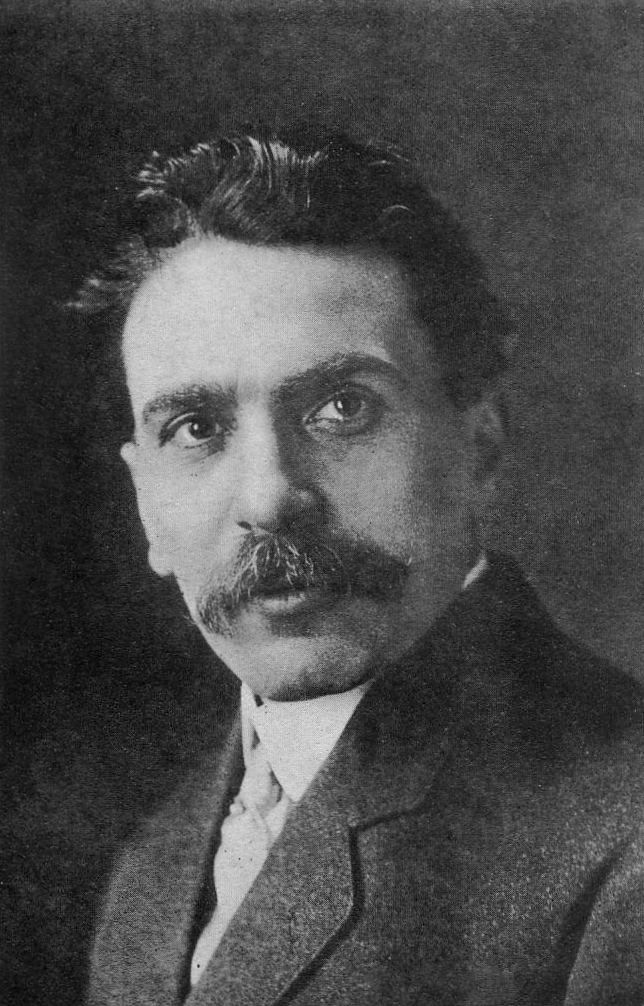
David Pinski around 1900

- Rita Achkina, cross country skier
- Matest M. Agrest, ethnologist and mathematician
- Modest Altschuler, orchestra conductor
- Abe Anellis, microbiologist
- Olga Bogdanova, chemist
- Petr Elfimov, musician
- Svetlana Baitova, gymnast
- Ihar Hershankou, serial killer
- Alyona Lanskaya, singer
- Eugenia Logvinovna Lashnyukova, nun
- Joseph Lookstein, Rabbi and President of Bar-Ilan University
- Leonid Isaakovich Mandelshtam, physicist
- Andrey Melnikov, soldier and recipient of Hero of the Soviet Union award
- Andrej Mryj, satirical writer, journalist, translator and a victim of Stalin's purges
- Ivan Nasovič, author of the first Belarusian dictionary
- Stanisław Julian Ostroróg, Polish count, Crimean War veteran, noted Victorian Photographic portraitist, naturalised British subject
- David Pinski, Yiddish playwright
- Simeon Piščević, major-general and governor of Mogilev (1777)
- Lev Polugaevsky, International Grandmaster of chess
- Leo Rogin, Economist and Writer
- Otto Schmidt, scientist, mathematician, astronomer, geophysicist, statesman, academician
- Issai Schur, mathematician
- Spiridon Sobol, Belarusian enlightener and printer; published the first ABC-book in Belarus in 1631
- Mikałaj Sudziłoŭski, revolutionary and scientist
- Sergey Evtuhov (born 1953), painter
- Nikolai Sudzilovsky, 1st President of the Hawaii Senate
- Helena Zarembina (1895–1960), Polish actress

== Sports ==
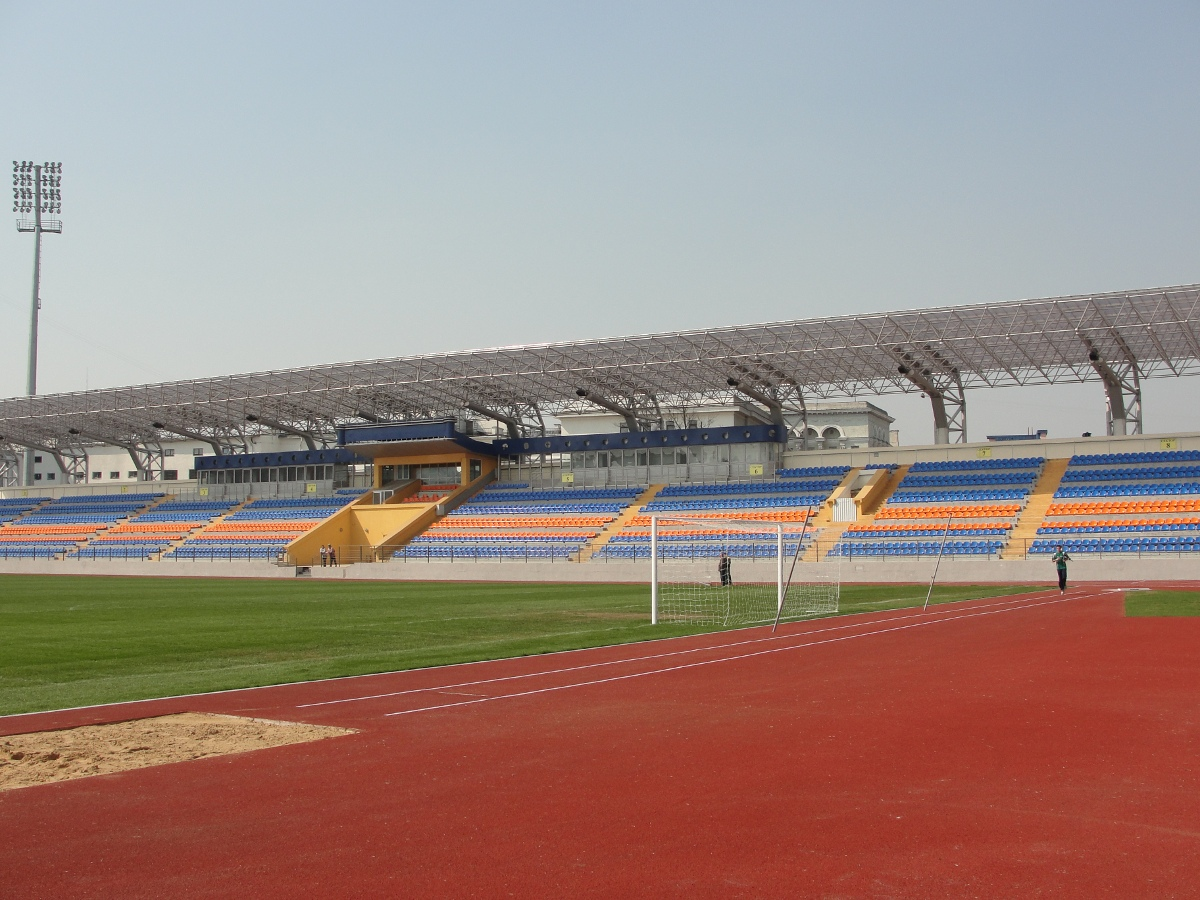
Spartak Stadium

City sports teams:

- Football: FC Torpedo Mogilev, FC Dnepr Mogilev and ZhFC Dnepr Mogilev, Nadezhda Mogilev
- Hockey: HK Mogilev
- Basketball: BC Borisfen

== Twin towns – sister cities ==
Mogilev is twinned with:

- Al Rayyan, Qatar
- Bursa, Turkey
- Changsha, China
- Eisenach, Germany
- Gabrovo, Bulgaria
- Kerch, Ukraine
- Kragujevac, Serbia
- Mykolaiv, Ukraine
- Nanjing, China
- Penza, Russia
- Sokolinaya Gora (Moscow), Russia
- Sumgait, Azerbaijan
- Tabriz, Iran
- Tula, Russia
- Villeurbanne, France
- Wittenberg, Germany
- Pivdenne, Ukraine
- Zhengzhou, China
- Zvenigorod, Russia
