= Olga Bogdanova =

Olga Bogdanova may refer to:

- Olga Bogdanova (chemist) (1896–1982), Soviet chemist
- Olga Bogdanova (actress) (born 1951), Soviet and Russian actress
- Olga Bogdanova (gymnast) (born 1994), Estonian gymnast
