= Eugenia Logvinovna Lashnyukova =

Russian nun

Eugenia Logvinovna Lashnyukova (born in 1891, in Mogilev, Russian Empire) was a Belarusian Eastern Orthodox nun who later converted to the Eastern Catholic Church.

== Biography ==
Lashnyukova was born in 1891 in Mogilev. In Kiev, she was admitted to Holy Trinity Monastery and later tonsured a nun. She was arrested in 1929, but released after nine months. In 1930, together with her sister, Lyudmila Verevsky-Sedletskaya, she joined the Catholic Church. Lashnyukova was engaged in teaching children in his apartment and taught them painting, embroidery and catechism. Arrested again in 1931, she was soon released and continued her work. On 9 July 1938, she was arrested for the third time. On October 29, that year, she was sentenced to five years in a labor camp. Her future is unknown.
