= Sergey Evtuhov =

Belarusian painter (born 1953)

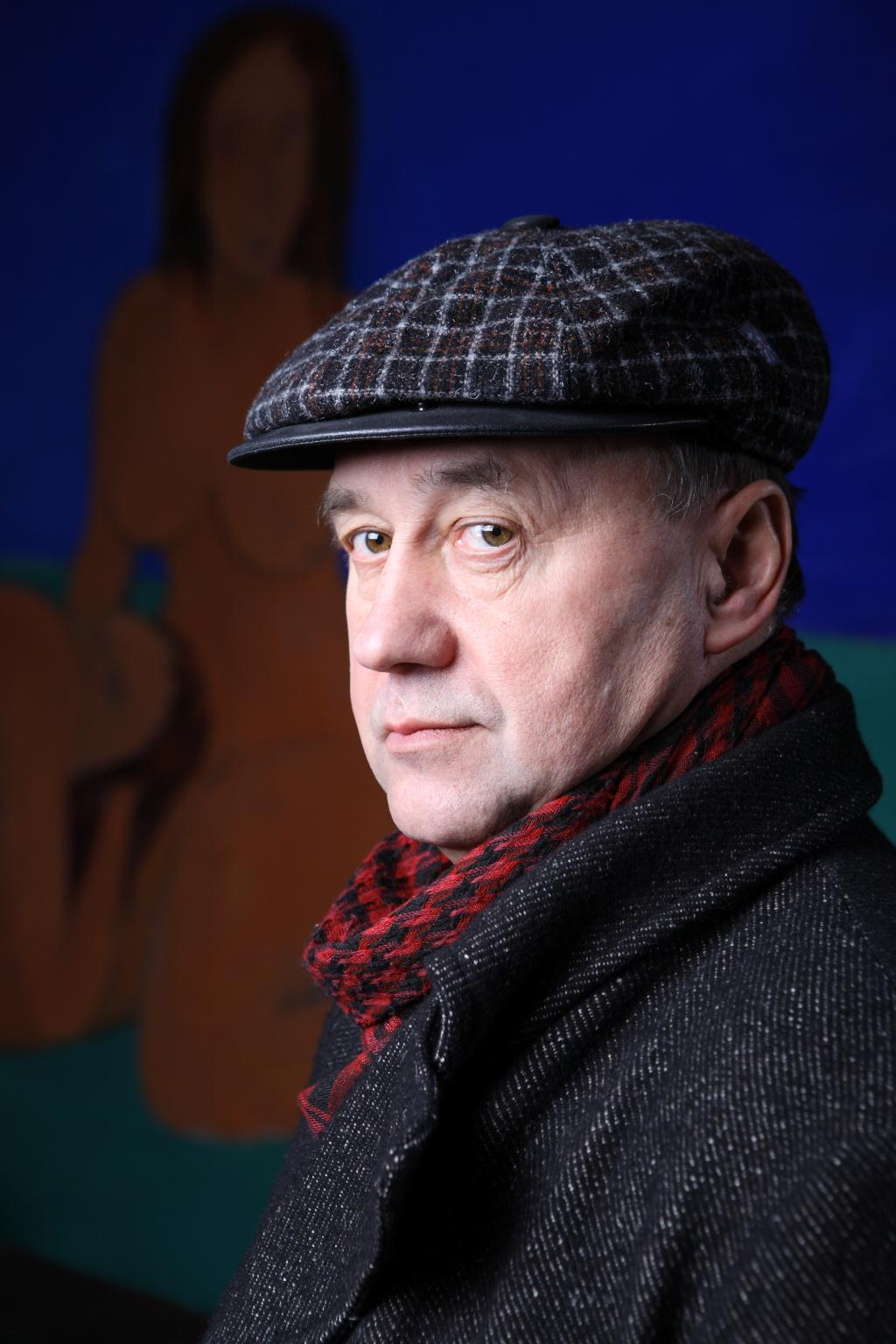
- Born: Sergey Petrovich Evtuhov; February 2, 1953 (age 73); Mogilev, Byelorussian SSR, Soviet Union

Sergey Evtuhov is a Russian painter, sculptor and author based in Vilnius, Lithuania. He has held over 30 personal exhibitions in Vilnius, Riga and Helsinki. His works are kept in private collections in the U.S., Canada, France, Russia, Lithuania and other countries.

== Early life and education ==
Sergey Evtuhov was born in Mogilev on February 2, 1953, in a family of high school teachers. Mogilev spent his childhood and teen years there until he was drafted to the Soviet army, and served for 2 years in the strategic missile troops. After having completed his military service, he enrolled in Riga Technical University, in the Department of aviation engineering, from which he graduated in 1981.

== Career ==
Sergey left aviation in 1991 in order to dedicate himself to painting. A prolific artist, Evtuhov created multiple paintings and sculptures and held more than 30 personal exhibitions. He also wrote several books, one of which received the Yuri Dolgorukiy Literature Award.

In an interview to the Lithuanian Courier, he said: “I never copied what I had found in the previous years because in my works there’s always pure search going on. This search leads me to victories.” Sergey is also an educator and author of teaching techniques in the sphere of visual arts.

== Artistic style and absurdmatism ==
Sergey Evtuhov’s works are characteristic of bright, expressive colors, usually with an absurd plot, or sometimes even devoid of plot as such. "Plotless art sets the painter free from a search of explanations to his artistic creations", says Sergey, "Refusal of plot can only enhance the impact of all the elements and the characters of the painting". The creative art of Sergey is difficult to fit into any particular artistic trend as it includes large palette of themes and scope of expressive means. The painter considers himself to belong to the new artistic trend of absurdmatism which he defines as an “attempt to combine the incongruous in order to engender harmony”.

== Literary series ==
Sergey Evtuhov wrote three books, two of which won international literary awards. The books are titled How I Spent the Summer (original title Как я провел лето. И хотел провести осень... Но осень сама чуть было меня не провела) and Thunderbird Proudly Hovers (Гордо реет буревестник, так похожий на антенну).

== Sculpture ==
In 2006 Sergey made his debut in the field of monumental sculpture with his exhibition held in honor of the French sculptor Jacques Lipchitz. The exhibition was held in the Lithuanian spa town of Druskininkai, the hometown of Lipchitz. His large sculptures could not be moved into any gallery under the roof, as a result, they were displayed outside between two lakes, with Enamored Sailor, Wounded Tiger and King and Queen receiving positive attention by critics. He also held exhibitions presenting his nude sculptures which mostly represent the characters of the paintings of Edgar Degas, Amedeo Modigliani, Toulouse-Lautrec, Paul Gauguin. These sculptures were made of chamotte clay. Sergey Evtuhov's sculpture is characteristic of unusual geometric plasticity, an aesthetic which is not equivalent to the cubism of the beginning of the 20th century.

== Auctions ==
In 2006 painter Evtuhov drew public attention and criticism when he decided to sell his painting The Firefighters to visiting designers, priced over 1 million dollars, in pieces. The buyers could not take an actual piece with them, but their names were published and promoted as sponsors of the art and co-owners of this artistic work. As a result, the painting was kept by the artist. Sergey is known for his unwillingness to sell many of his masterpieces.

== Continuation of Henri Matisse’ series ==
One of the recent projects by Evtuhov is connected with Henri Matisse. Sergey continued works by Matisse – The Dance and The Music, kept in the Hermitage Museum. In the same palette: figures are in red, ground – in green, the sky – in blue. The size of the canvas is the same as Matisse’: 2.60 by 3.90 i.e. each painting is almost 4 meters long. The second picture was named The Baithing (or The Meditation) and was taken from an unrealized project. Matisse was planning to paint the third picture, but the customer – the collector Schukin – confined himself only to The Dance and The Music. Sergey decided to sculpt the piece anyway and created the work The Baithing (or The Meditation).

== Gallery ==
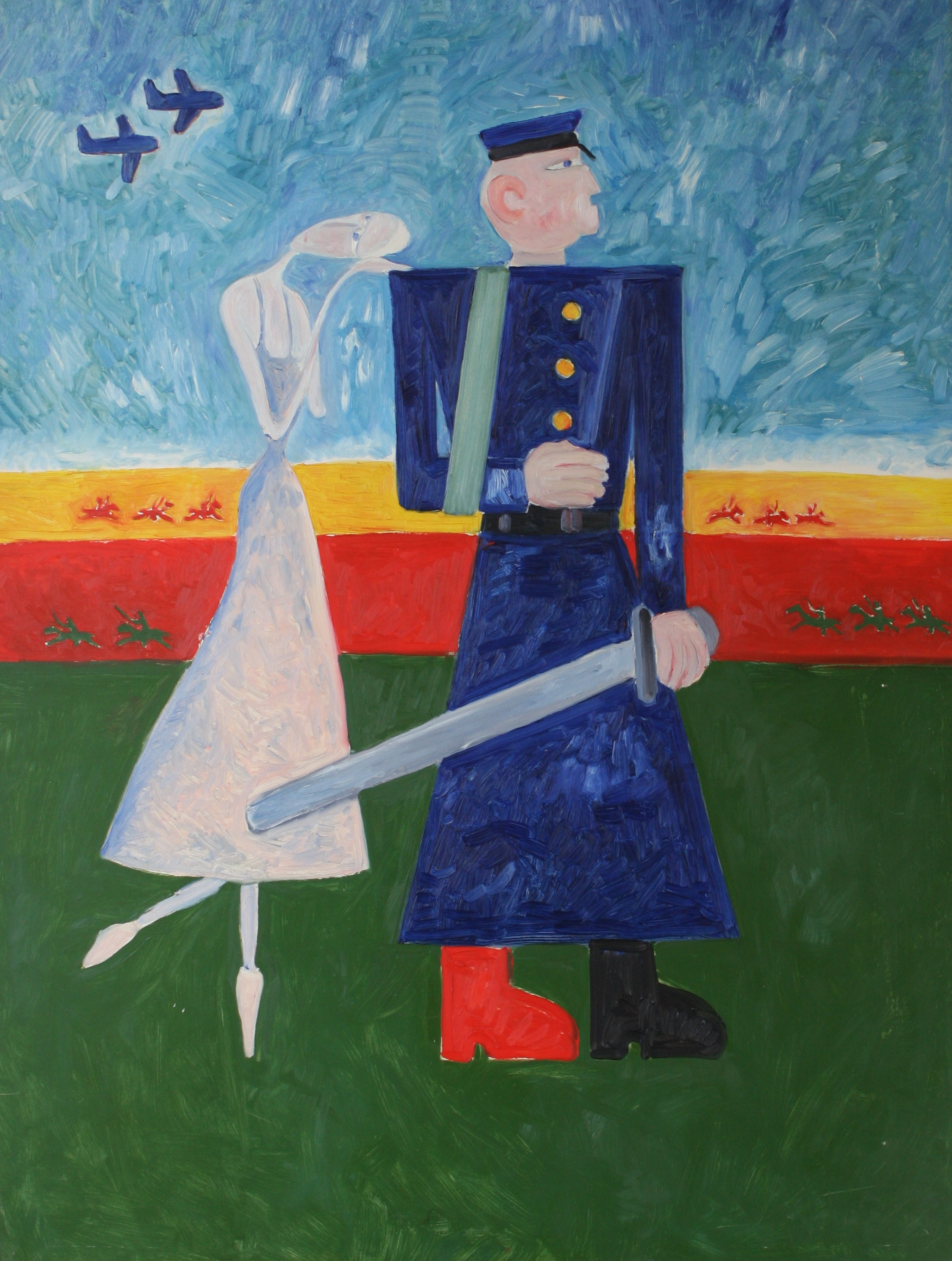

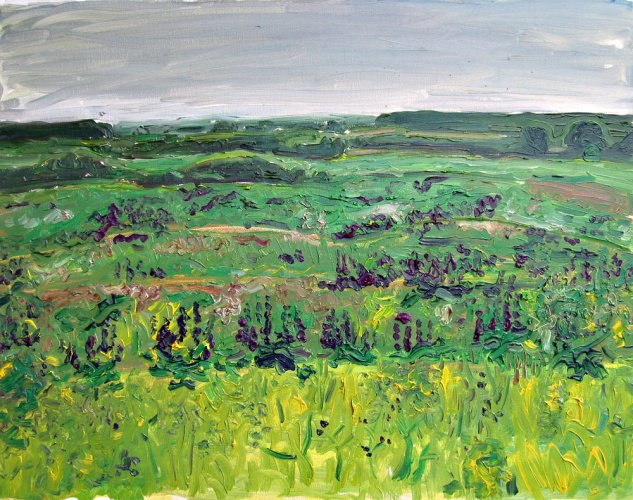

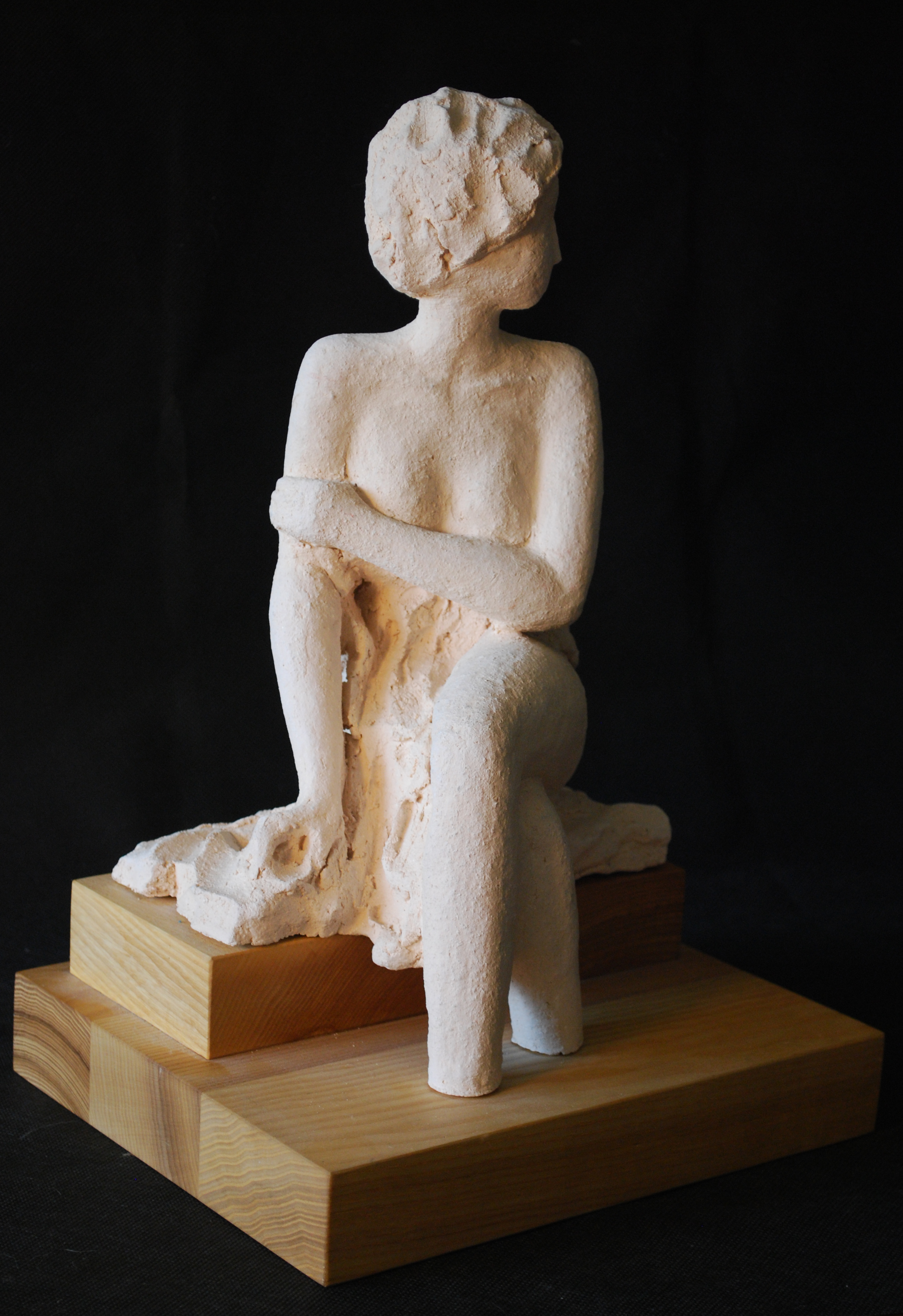

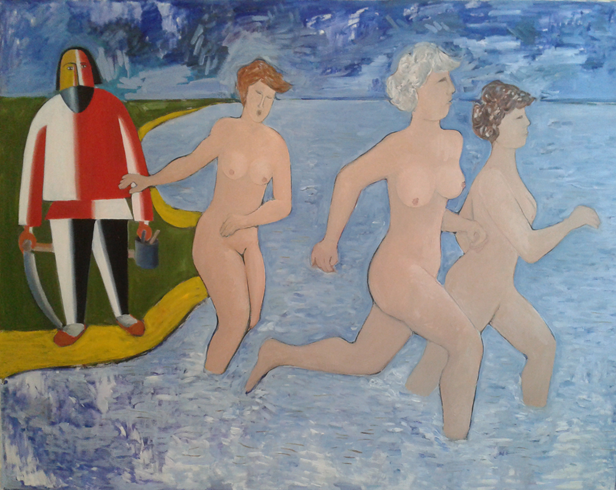

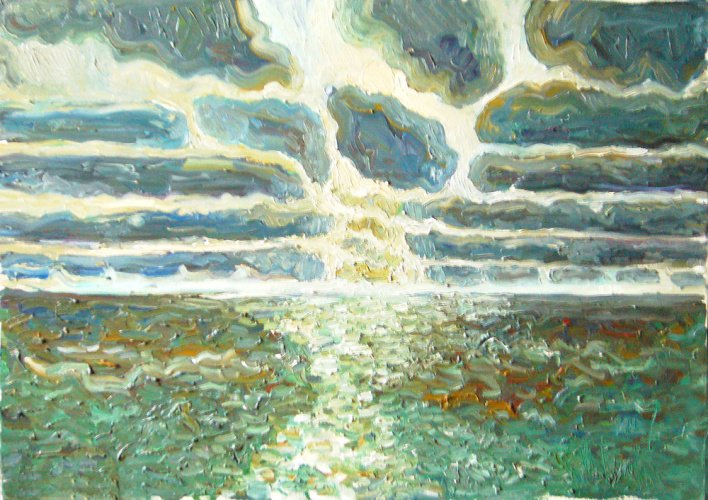

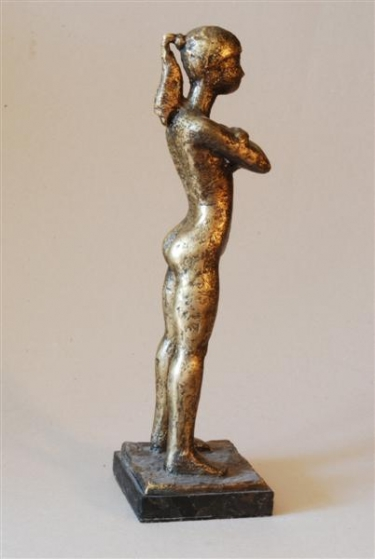

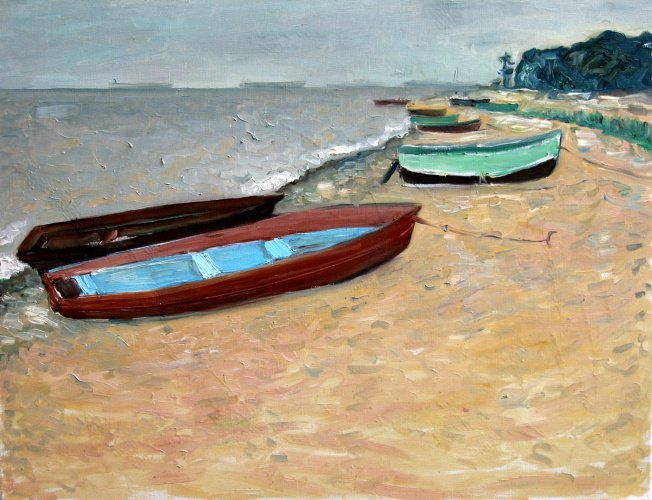

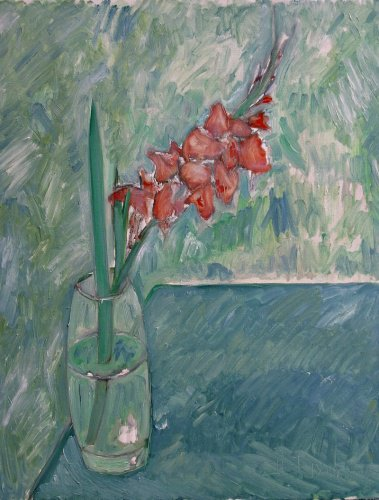

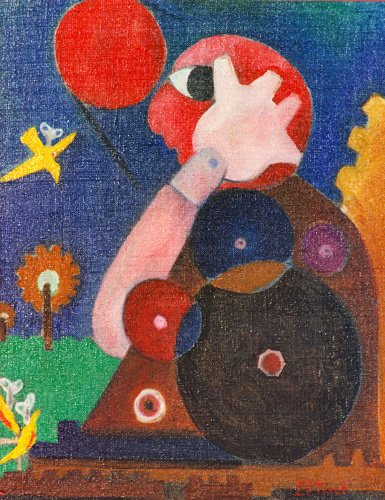

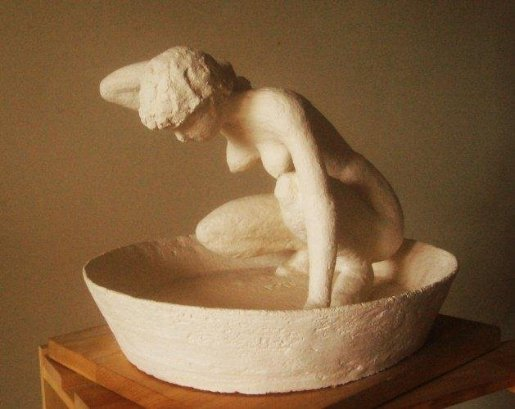

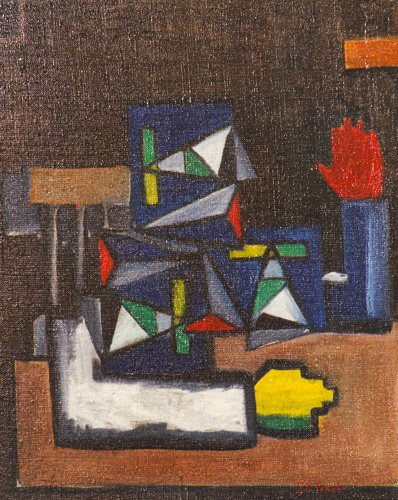

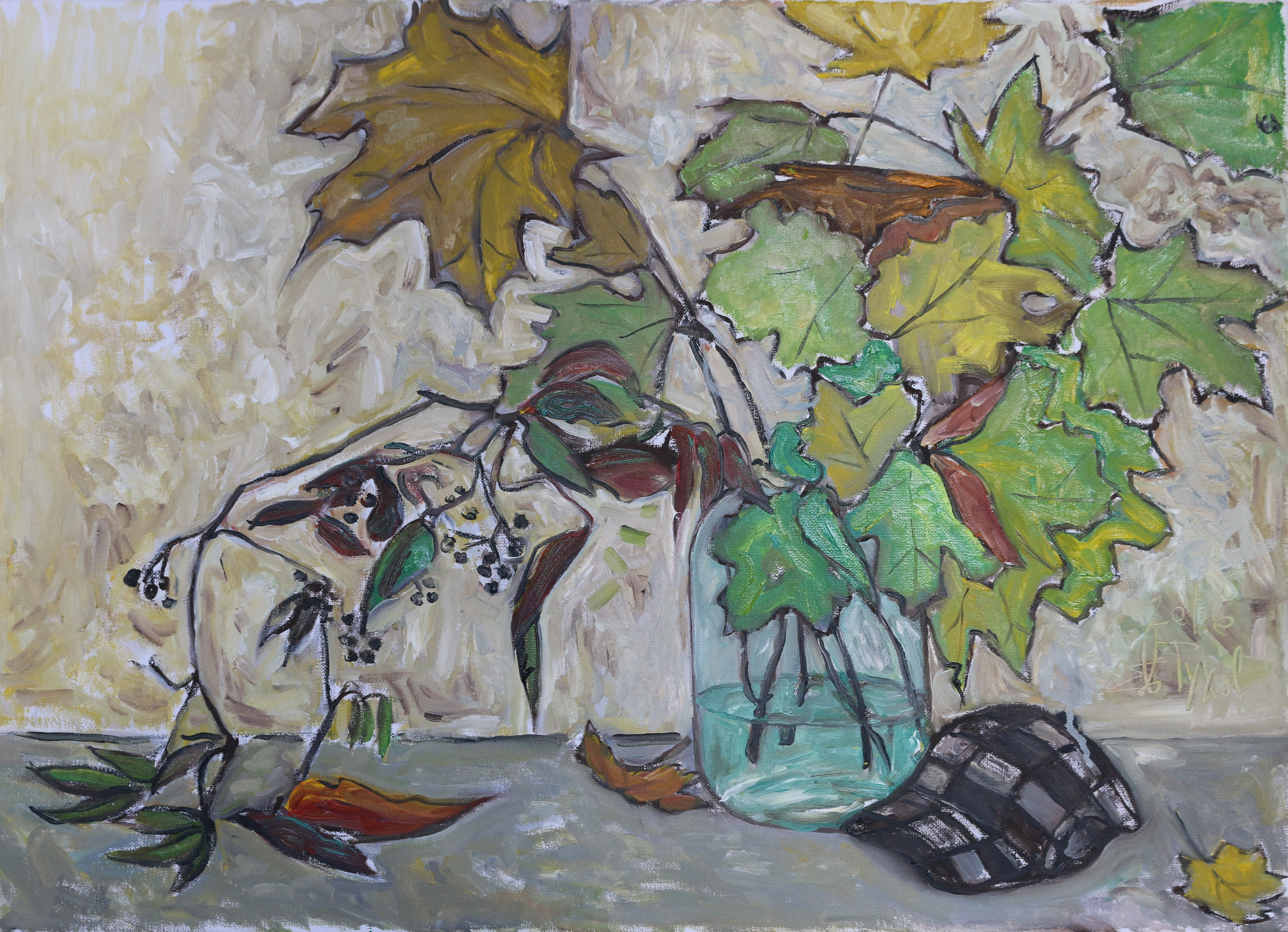

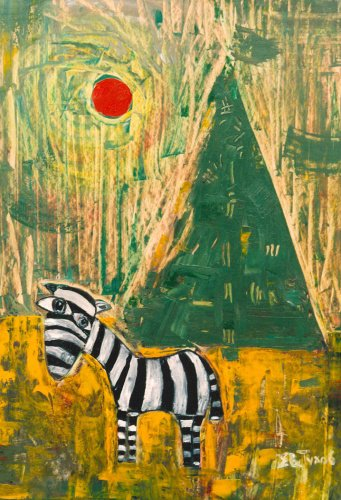

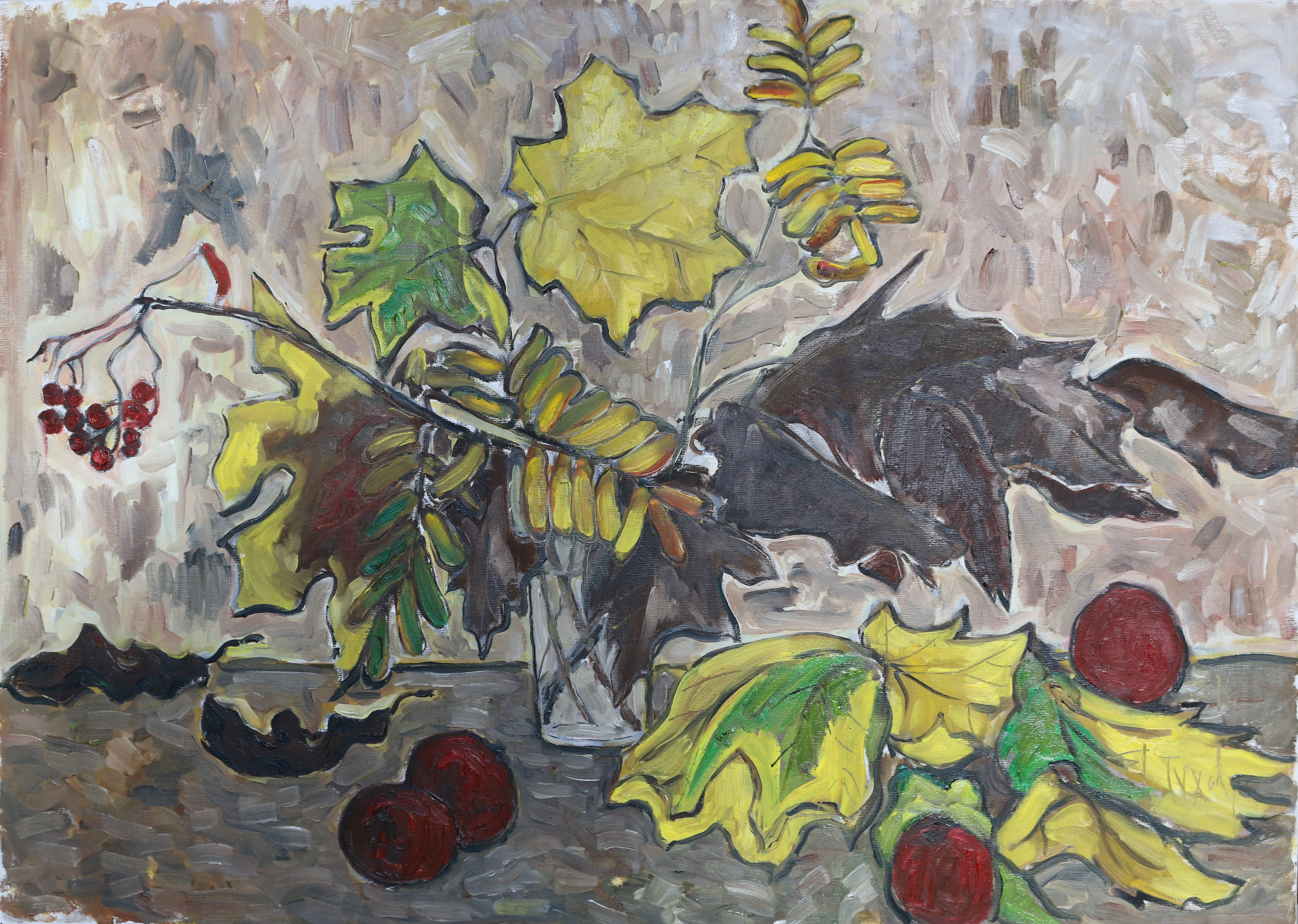
