= The Dictionary of the Belarusian Local Tongue =

Belarusian-language dictionary

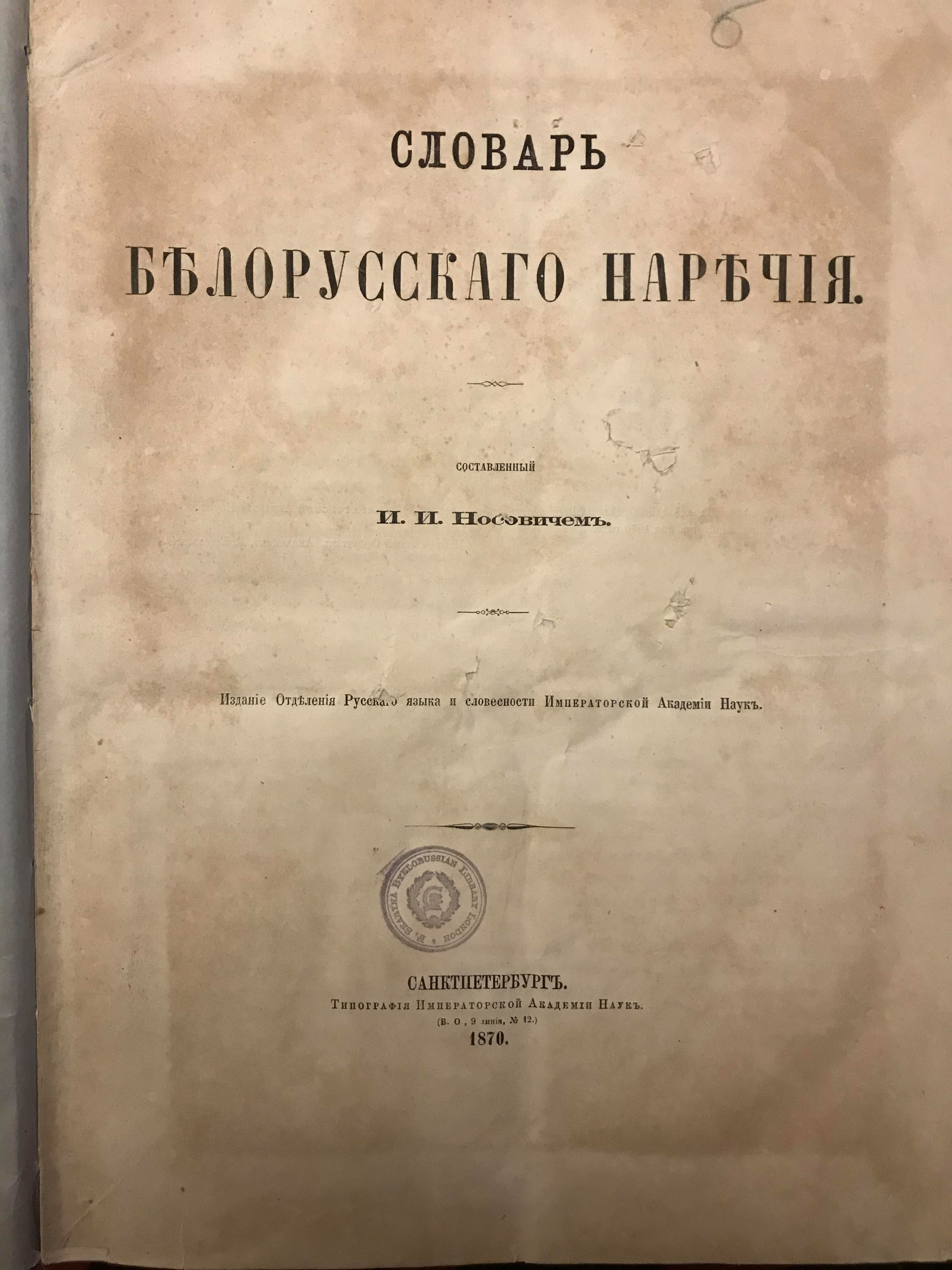
- The cover of the copy preserved at the Francis Skaryna Belarusian Library and Museum
- Author: Ivan Nasovič
- Original title: Словарь Бѣлорусскаго нарѣчія
- Language: Belarusian
- Genre: Dictionary
- Publication date: 1870
- Publication place: Russian Empire
- Website: https://belarus.github.io/Slouniki-Nasovic/index.html

The Dictionary of the Belarusian Local Tongue (the original title in Russian: Словарь Бѣлорусскаго нарѣчія; also translated as the Dictionary of the Belarusian Language or the Dictionary of the Belarusian Dialect) was the first dictionary of the modern Belarusian language published in 1870. It was authored by a prominent 19th century Belarusian ethnographer, Ivan Nasovič (Belarusian: Іван Насовіч).

== Background ==
The modern Belarusian language appeared on the basis of the Old Belarusian language widely spoken in the ethnic Belarusian territories in the 19th century. From the mid-1830s, ethnographers started studying the spoken language. Based on the variants spoken in the Minsk region, an ethnographer Pavel Špileŭski developed a Belarusian grammar using the Cyrillic alphabet in 1846.

A need for a dictionary of the Belarusian language has arisen during the publication of the “Acts Related to the History of Western Russia, compiled and published by the Archaeographical Commission” (“Акты, относящиеся к истории Западной России, собранные и изданные Археографическою комиссиею”) in 1843–53. The editor of the Acts, archpriest Ivan Hryharovič(1792–1852) intended to produce a Belarusian dictionary as part of the project. However, the idea did not materialise due to Hryharovič's untimely death - who has only had time to compete the first 10 pages.

== Author ==
Ivan Nasovič (7 October 1788 - 6 August 1877) was born in the village of Hrazivec, Mahilioŭ Province of the Russian Empire (present-day Mahilioŭ Region of Belarus) into the family of a Greek-Catholic (Uniate) priest. He graduated from a seminary in Mahilioŭ in 1812 but embarked on a career in teaching, later becoming a school supervisor.

Upon retirement in 1843, Nasovič decided to pursue academic activities in the fields of ethnography and folklore. By 1850 he has written a number of papers: "Short Philological Observations of the Belarusian Speech", "Small Belarusian Dictionary", and "Collection of Belarusian Proverbs". The last of these included approximately 3500 proverbs, tongue-twisters, wishes and greetings, explaining their meaning and origin.

In 1868, his book "Belarusian Proverbs and Riddles" was published, followed by "Belarusian Songs" in 1873. The latter included more than 350 songs dedicated to various family and calendar rites, customs and holidays.

Nasovič also researched the history of early Belarus. In his historical and linguistic study "About the Tribes Who Inhabited the Area of Belarus before the Time of Rurik" he explains the origins of ancient tribal names derived from native Belarusian words.

However, the culmination of his academic work which brought Nasovič into prominence was the Dictionary of the Belarusian Local Tongue.

He died in Mscislaŭ (present-day Mahilioŭ Region of Belarus) and was buried in a local cemetery. One of the streets in Mscislaŭ is named after him and a local arts school has a plaque in his memory.

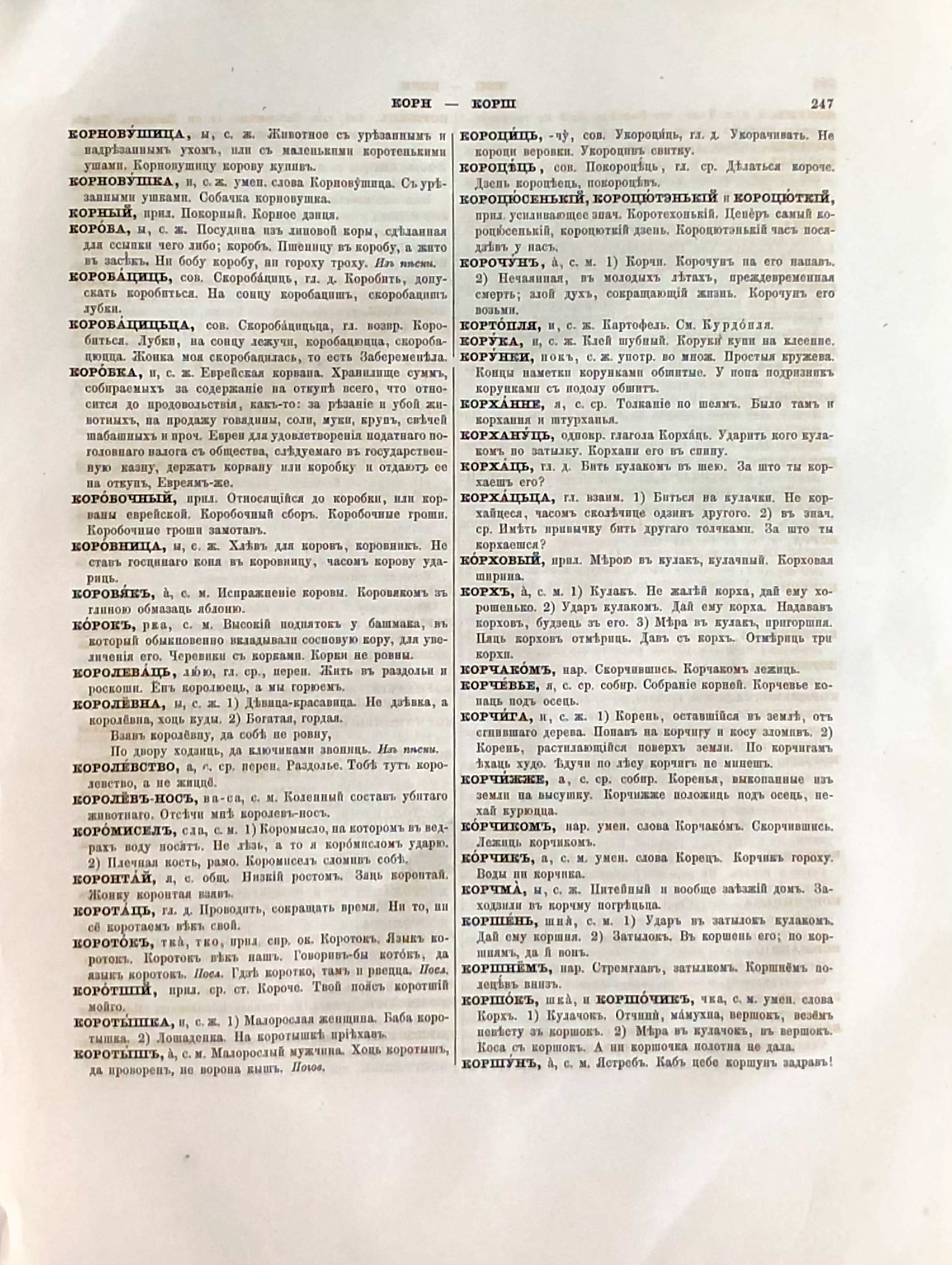
A page from the copy of the Dictionary preserved at the Francis Skaryna Belarusian Library in London, UK

== Dictionary ==
The dictionary, finished in 1863, was a result of 16 years of scrupulous work by Nasovič. Its forerunner was the unpublished Index of Ancient Belarusian Words Selected from the Acts Relating to the History of Western Russia, with the explanation of approximately 13 thousand words and concepts.

The dictionary was published by the Imperial Academy of Science in St Petersburg in May 1870. In its editorial introduction, it is noted that:

The Belarusian local tongue, which dominates a vast area from the Nioman and the Narew to the Upper Volga and from the Western Dvina to the Prypiac and the Ipuc and which is spoken by inhabitants of the North-Western and certain adjacent provinces, or those lands that were in the past settled by the Kryvic tribe, has long attracted the attention of our philologists because of those precious remains of the ancient [Ruthenian] language that survived in that tongue.

With over 30 thousand words the dictionary was described as "an unsurpassed collection of the lexicon of a living language" and as being "[a]mong the principal landmarks of the Belarusian national revival after January Uprising of 1863".

After the publication of the dictionary, Nasovič continued collecting linguistic materials, which found their way in the Supplement to the Belarusian Dictionary, published posthumously in 1881.
