= Leo Rogin =

American economist

Leo Rogin (1893, Mogilev, Belarus – 1947, Berkeley, CA, USA) was an American economist, economic historian and historian of economic thought.

== Major publications ==
- "The Introduction of Farm Machinery in its Relation to the Productivity of Labor in the Agriculture of the United States During the 19th Century", 1931.
- "Werner Sombart and the 'Natural Science Method' in Economics", JPE, 1933.
- "American Economic Thought", AER, 1933.
- "The New Deal: A Survey of the Literature", QJE, 1935.
- "Davenport on the Economics of Alfred Marshall", AER, 1936.
- "The Significance of Marxian Economics for Current Trends of Government Policy", AER, 1938.
- "Werner Sombart and Transcendentalism", AER, 1941.
- "Marx and Engels on Distribution in a Socialist Society", AER, 1945.
- "The Meaning and Validity of Economic Theory: A Historical Approach", 1956.

== Secondary sources ==
- Blaug, Mark (1962, 1st ed.) Economic Theory in Retrospect.
- Hutchison, Terence W. (1978) - On Revolutions and Progress in Economic Knowledge.
