= Olga Bogdanova (chemist) =

Soviet chemist

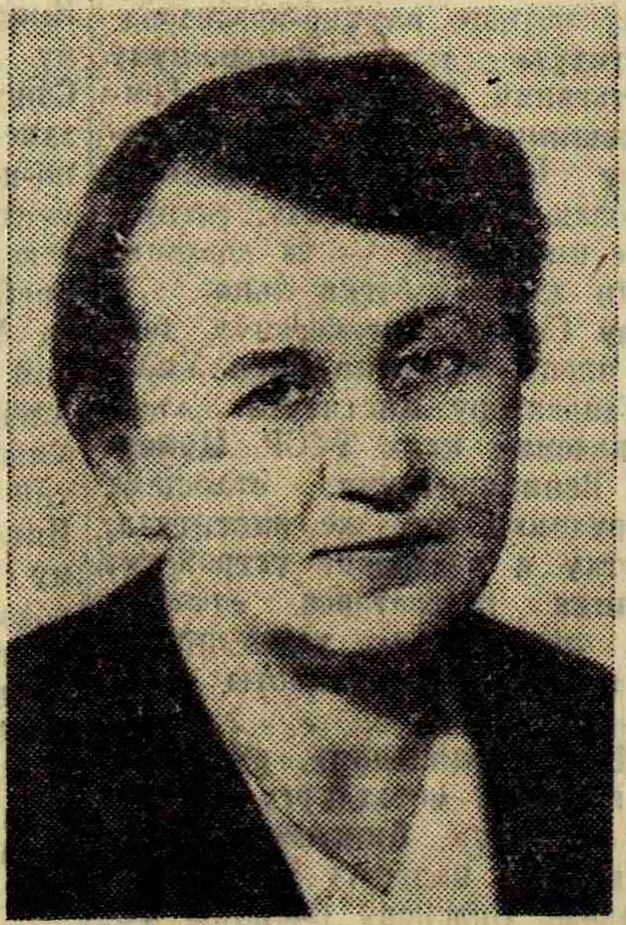
- Bogdanova in 1950
- Born: Olga Konstantinovna Bogdanova; 29 June n.s. (11 July o.s.) 1896; Mogilev, Russian Empire
- Died: March 1982 (aged 85)
- Citizenship: USSR
- Awards: Order of the Red Banner of Labour 1953, 1967; Medal “For Valorous Labour during the Great Patriotic War, 1941-1945”; Medal “In Honor of the 800th Anniversary of the Founding of Moscow”; Stalin Prize 1950
- Scientific career
- Institutions: Academy of Sciences of the Soviet Union, Institute of Organic Chemistry

Olga Konstantinovna Bogdanova (Russian: Ольга Константиновна Богда́нова; 29 June n.s., 1896 — March 1982) was a Soviet chemist who specialized in organic catalysis.

== Biography ==
In the 1920s Bogdanova worked in a laboratory at a synthetic rubber factory.

From the early 1930s she worked at the N. D. Zelinsky Institute of Organic Chemistry of the Academy of Sciences of the Soviet Union (now: Russian Academy of Sciences). Bordanova was a student and, for many years, a colleague of Academicians N. D. Zelinsky and A. A. Balandin.

=== Main achievements ===
- In 1941—1942 A. A. Balandin, O. K. Bogdanova, and A. P. Shcheglova developed and implemented at a synthetic rubber factory a method for producing a gas-resistant (polysulfide or thio) rubber, which was widely used in the production of a “self-tightening” – or, more accurately, “self-sealing” when struck by bullets – coating for aircraft fuel tanks.
- In 1946—1952, a new method was developed for obtaining 1,3 butadiene from petroleum feedstock on chromium oxide catalysts, which found industrial application at synthetic rubber factories in Sterlitamak and Sumgait (O. K. Bogdanova and A. P. Shcheglova)
- In 1974—1981 O. K. Bogdanova and D. P. Belomestnykh developed a way to produce styrene (vinylbenzene) and its homologues through the oxidative decomposition of alkyl-benzene over a complex chromium oxide catalyst, which surpassed all known industrial catalysts used to decompose ethylbenzene.

Bogdanova held a Ph.D. in Chemistry, and she was a senior research associate.

She was buried in the Vagankovo Cemetery.

== Awards and prizes ==
- Stalin Prize, 2nd degree (1950) – for the development and industrial application of a catalyst used in a new chemical process
- Order of the Red Banner of Labour (1953, 1967)
- Medals

== Publications ==
- Balandin, A. A.; Bogdanova, O. K.; Isaguliants, G. V.; Neiman, M. B.; Popov, E. I. (1958). "Use of radiocarbon for comparing the rates of dehydrogenation of butane and butane". Bulletin of the Academy of Sciences of the USSR Division of Chemical Science. 7 (1): 16–20. doi:10.1007/bf01170855.
- Balandin, A. A.; Bogdanova, O. K.; Shcheglova, A. P. (August 1957). "Effect of the molecular structure of an alcohol on the kinetics of its dehydrogenation". Bulletin of the Academy of Sciences of the USSR Division of Chemical Science. 6 (8): 942–947. doi:10.1007/bf01173588.
- Balandin, A. A.; Bogdanova, O. K.; Shcheglova, A. P. (1955). "Free energy change in the adsorptional displacement of butene by water from a catalyst surface". Bulletin of the Academy of Sciences of the USSR Division of Chemical Science. 4 (4): 643–651. doi:10.1007/bf01167349.
- Balandin, A. A.; Nelman, M. B.; Bogdanova, O. K.; isagulyants, G. V.; Shcheglova, A. P.; Popov, E. I. (1958). "Dehydrogenation of butane-butene mixtures investigated with the aid of C14". Bulletin of the Academy of Sciences of the USSR Division of Chemical Science. 6 (2): 167–175. doi:10.1007/bf01170549.
- Balandin, A. A.; Neiman, M. B.; Bogdanova, O. K.; Isagulyants, G. V.; Shcheglova, A. P.; Popov, E. I. (March 1957). "Formation of carbon dioxide in the preparation of butadiene from butane - butane mixtures". Bulletin of the Academy of Sciences of the USSR Division of Chemical Science. 6 (3): 285–288. doi:10.1007/bf01173331.
- Belomestnykh, I; Bogdanova, O; Balandin, A (1963). "Influence of the structure of hydrocarbons on the kinetics of their dehydrogenation". Petroleum Chemistry U.S.S.R. 2 (3): 341–348. doi:10.1016/0031-6458(63)90058-3.
- Bogdanova, O. K.; Balandin, A. A.; Belomestnykh, I. P. (December 1963). "Effect of the structure of alkylaromatic hydrocarbons on the dehydrogenation kinetics, and the dehydrogenation of diethylbenzene". Bulletin of the Academy of Sciences, USSR Division of Chemical Science. 12 (12): 1937–1941. doi:10.1007/bf00843986.
- Bogdanova, O. K.; Balandin, A. A.; Belomestnykh, I. P. (April 1963). "Principles of catalytic dehydrogenation of alkyl aromatic hydrocarbons". Bulletin of the Academy of Sciences, USSR Division of Chemical Science. 12 (4): 550–553. doi:10.1007/bf00843938.
- Bogdanova, O. K.; Balandin, A. A.; Shcheglova, A. P. (March 1961). "Regularities in the catalytic de hydrogenation of primary and secondary alcohols". Bulletin of the Academy of Sciences of the USSR Division of Chemical Science. 10 (3): 392–396. doi:10.1007/bf01131053.
- Bogdanova, O. K.; Balandin, A. A.; Shcheglova, A. P. (August 1959). "Effect of the structure of an alcohol molecule on the kinetics of its dehydrogenation". Bulletin of the Academy of Sciences of the USSR Division of Chemical Science. 8 (8): 1325–1330. doi:10.1007/bf00918569.
- Bogdanova, O. K.; Balandin, A, A; Shcheglova, A, P. (1958). "Effect of the molecular structure of an alcohol on the kinetics of its dehydrogenation". Bulletin of the Academy of Sciences of the USSR Division of Chemical Science. 6 (7): 807–813. doi:10.1007/bf01160222.
- Bogdanova, O; Belomestnykh, I; Voikina, N; Balandindec, A (1967). "The oxidative dehydrogenation of ethylbenzene to styrene". Petroleum Chemistry U.S.S.R. 7 (3): 186–190. doi:10.1016/0031-6458(67)90018-4.
- Bogdanova, O; Shcheglova, A; Balandin, A (1963). "Catalytic dehydrogenation of individual isopentenes to isoprene". Petroleum Chemistry U.S.S.R. 2 (3): 307–314. doi:10.1016/0031-6458(63)90055-8.
- Bogdanova, O. K.; Shcheglova, A. P.; Balandin, A. A. (July 1963). "The catalytic dehydrog enation of isomeric isopentenes. Part 3. The catalytic conversions of isopentenes in relation to their structure". Bulletin of the Academy of Sciences, USSR Division of Chemical Science. 12 (7): 1111–1114. doi:10.1007/bf00849666.
- Bogdanova, O. K.; Shcheglova, A. P.; Balandin, A. A. (February 1960). "Effect of molecular structure on dehydrogenation kinetics in the case of C4 and C8 alcohols". Bulletin of the Academy of Sciences of the USSR Division of Chemical Science. 9 (2): 327–330. doi:10.1007/bf00942913.
- Bogdanova, O. K.; Shcheglova, A. P.; Balandin, A. A. (February 1960). "Effect of molecular structure on dehydrogenation in the case of C2 and C25-C9 alcohols". Bulletin of the Academy of Sciences of the USSR Division of Chemical Science. 9 (2): 322–326. doi:10.1007/bf00942912.
- Bogdanova, O. K.; Shcheglova, A. P.; Balandin, A. A. (February 1959). "Catalytic dehydrogenation of isopentane-isopentene mixtures". Bulletin of the Academy of Sciences of the USSR Division of Chemical Science. 8 (2): 322–325. doi:10.1007/bf00917383.
- Bogdanova, O; Shcheglova, A; Balandin, A; Belomestnykh, I (1962). "Catalytic dehydrogenation of ethylbenzene to styrene". Petroleum Chemistry U.S.S.R. 1 (1): 120–127. doi:10.1016/0031-6458(62)90062-x.
- Bogdanova, O. K.; Shcheglova, A. P.; Balandin, A. A.; Voznesenskaya, I. I. (April 1961). "Catalytic dehydrogenation of n-pentenes". Bulletin of the Academy of Sciences of the USSR Division of Chemical Science. 10 (4): 532–536. doi:10.1007/bf00909114.
- Shcheglova, A. P.; Bogdanova, O. K.; Balandin, A. A. (June 1963). "Catalytic dehydrogenation of isomeric isopentenes". Bulletin of the Academy of Sciences, USSR Division of Chemical Science. 12 (6): 911–913. doi:10.1007/bf00845464.
- Voikina, N. V.; Makhlis, L. A.; Kiperman, S. L.; Bogdanova, O. K. (1 January 1974). "Kinetics of the dehydrogenation reactions of isopentenes to isoprene. I. Laws governing coke formation during the course of the reaction". Kinet. Catal. (USSR). 15 (3): 582–589. OCLC 4436965782. OSTI 4253934.
