= Wooden church =

Wooden church may refer to:

== Building styles ==
- Carpathian wooden churches:
  - Wooden churches of Maramureș, Romania
  - Wooden churches of the Slovak Carpathians, including three articular churches
  - Wooden churches of Southern Lesser Poland
  - Wooden churches in Ukraine
  - Wooden Tserkvas of the Carpathian Region in Poland and Ukraine
- Serbian wooden churches
- Churches of Chiloé, in southern Chile
- Dairthech, common in medieval Ireland
- Stave church

== Specific buildings ==
=== Hungary ===
- Wooden Church, Miskolc

=== Romania ===
- Wooden Church, Bocșa, Sălaj County
- Wooden Church, Camăr, Sălaj County
- Wooden Church, Cehei, Șimleu Silvaniei, Sălaj County
- Wooden Church, Derșida, Bobota, Sălaj County
- Wooden Church, Dumuslău, Carastelec, Sălaj County
- Wooden Church, Porț, Sălaj County
- Wooden Church, Reghin, Mureș County
- Wooden Church, Sighetu Silvaniei, Chieșd, Sălaj County
- Wooden Church, Tusa, Sâg, Sălaj County
- Wooden Church, Târgu Mureș, Mureș County
- Wooden Church, Zalnoc, Bobota, Sălaj County

=== Russia ===
- Kizhi Pogost, Kizhi Island

== Other uses ==
- Wooden Churches Trail, around Puszcza Zielonka Landscape Park, Poland
