= Alimpiu Barboloviciu =

Romanian priest (1843–1914)

Alimpiu Barbulovici
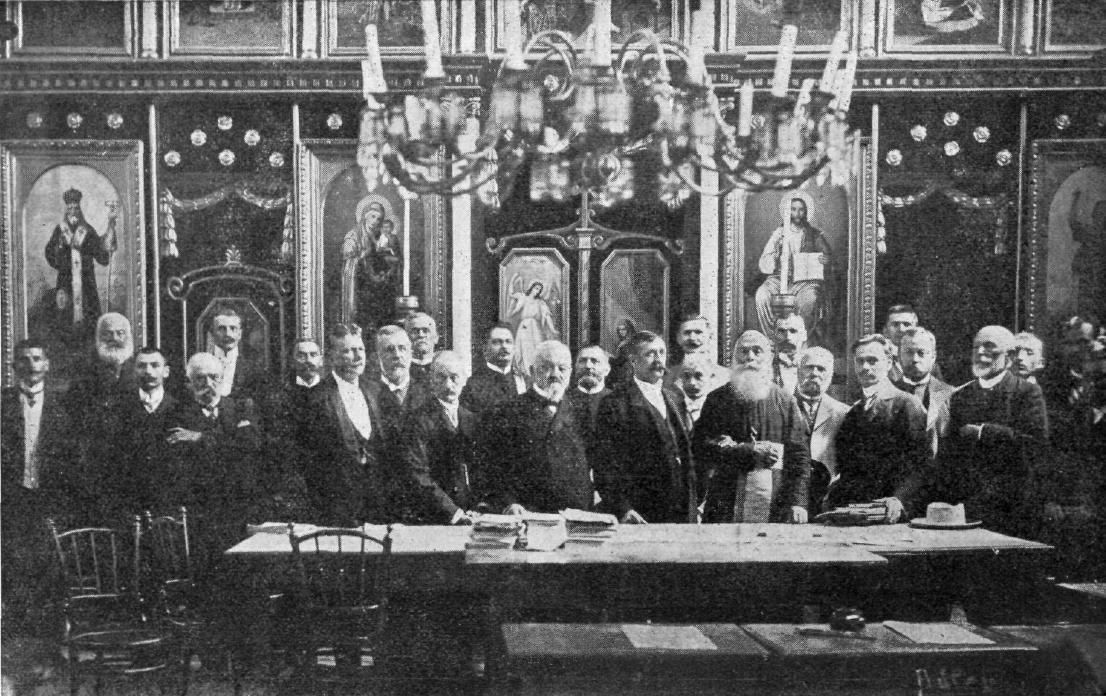
- Alimpiu Barbulovici with members of the elite of Transylvania in August 1908, his parish from Șimleu Silvaniei
- Born: August 6, 1843; Chilioara
- Died: December 10, 1914 (aged 71); Bocșa, Sălaj
- Resting place: Bocșa, Sălaj; 47°17′56″N 22°55′10″E
- Education: Central Seminary in Budapest
- Known for: Vicar Forane of the Greek Catholic Vicariate of Șimleu Silvaniei (1873–1913)
- Predecessor: Demetriu Coroianu
- Successor: Alexandru Gheţie
- Spouse: Maria Barbolovici (née Bocșa)
- Children: Virgil (Sub-judge), Cornel (machinist), Simeon Barbolovici (priest)
- Parent(s): Alexandru (1807 – 19 January 1869) and Sofia Pop (got married in 1831)
- Relatives: Brothers: Alexandru (died at 62 yo), Isidor (1832–1872), priest in Vârșolț and one unknown; Sisters: Sofia, Ana, Iustina

Alimpiu Barbuloviciu (Chilioara, August 6, 1843 – Bocşa, December 10, 1914) was the Vicar Forane of the Greek Catholic Vicariate of Șimleu Silvaniei (1873–1913) and the head of the branch of Astra in Sălaj County.

== Biography ==
His parents came at Chilioara, Sălaj from Craciunel, Coșeiu, Sălaj County. Alimpiu Barbulovici was born to Alexandru Barbolovici (1807 – 19 January 1869) and Sofia Pop (they got married in 1831) on August 6, 1843. He attended school in Șimleu Silvaniei, Cluj, Satu Mare, Trnava, and Central Seminary in Budapest. He was a priest at Gherla, Borșa, Cluj and on 6 September 1873 was appointed vicar of Șimleu Silvaniei. The two general assemblies of Astra took place in Simleu, on 6 August 1878 and 6 August 1908, under his leadership. He was among the most active supporters of the Transylvanian Memorandum.

He attended the courses of the general and secondary school in Șimleu Silvaniei. On September 1, 1850, he was enrolled in the 7th grade at the Piarist Gymnasium in Cluj, and on September 14, 1852, he was sent by Alexandru Sterca-Șuluțiu to complete his high school studies, in Trnava (Slovakia). After graduation from gymnasium, it was also sent by Metropolitan Alexandru Sterca-Șuluțiu to the Central Seminary in Budapest, to study theology. In 1858 he returned from Budapest and was appointed an official in the Diocesan Chancellery of Gherla, with a perspective to become a professor of theology. However, he did not accept the teaching career, and in the summer of 1859 he was appointed a priest in Borșa commune, Cluj. Barbulovici was a part of the priesthood without wealth. He was a member of the school senate of Doboka County. In 1861 he was invited to the National Congress of Astra in Sibiu, but it is not known if he participated.

On September 6, 1873, the bishop of Gherla has appointed A. Barbulovici the vicar of Silvania, the parish of Șimleului, the protopop of Crasna and Valcau. Like Demetriu Coroianu, he was also president of the Department of Astra in Silvania, at those two general meetings of Astra in 1878 and 1908 in Șimleu taking place under his leadership. In 1871 he was elected the president of the "Astrei" of Salaj Department. As president he organized two general meetings in Simlu: the first on August 6, 1878, and the second on August 6, 1908. On May 15, 1874, he was also elected the president of the "Meeting of the Salajeni Romanian Teachers", a position that he held for 11 years. Since 1881 he has been a founding member and a reliable member of the "Meeting of Romanian Women in Salajene", since 1888 he was a founding member and the first president of the "Silvana" Institute of Credit and Economics, a lifetime member of the Society for the creation of a Romanian theater fund. At his home in Simleu it was decided who would be part of the delegation that was to take the Memorandum of the Romanians to Vienna in 1892. Also in the time of Barboloviciu's pastorate, in 1893, in the new church in Simleu was painted and placed iconostasis. Alimpiu Barboloviciu was the longest-serving in the position of foreign vicar of Salaj (1873–1913); he was followed by Alexandru Ghetie (1914–1922). He held a continuous correspondence with George Bariț and other personalities of the time. He has collaborated with several magazines: "Sionul Român", "Amvonul", "Church, literary and scholastic sheet", etc.

Barboloviciu had 3 children: Virgil sub-judge; Cornel engineer; Simion theologian – la Gherla. His wife, an active member of the Committee of the Salajene Women's Meeting, died on June 27, 1896. On January 19, 1914, the vicar of Silvania move to Bocsa, Salaj, where his son Simion Barbulovici was a priest. On this occasion, in his honor, a ceremony was held at the vicarage house in Șimleu Silvaniei. He has died from pneumonia on December 10, 1914. His body was placed in the courtyard of the wooden church in Bocsa, near the tomb of Simion Bărnuțiu. In 1948 Barboloviciu's wreckage. were moved inside the mausoleum of the Greek-Catholic Church in Bocșa.

Vasile Alecsandri, Ioan Micu Moldovan, Ilie Măcelariu, Ioan Raţiu, Gheorghe Pop de Băsești, Vasile Lucaciu were among his correspondents.

== Legacy ==
- The remains of Alimpiu Barbuloviciu are located in the church in Bocșa, Sălaj and are a place of pilgrimage.
- Alimpiu Barbulovici Street in Zalău

== Bibliography ==
- Vasile Vetişanu Mocanu: Alimpiu Barbuloviciu. "Cartea Şimleului". Bucureºti, Editura Litera, 1985, p. 216.
- "Revista arhivelor", LVII, vol. XLII, nr. 1, 1980, p. 68-76.
- Diaconovich, Cornel, Enciclopedia română "ASTRA". Tomul I: A- Copenhaga., Editura şi tiparul lui W. Krafft, Sibiu, 1898
- Suciu, Dumitru, Antecedentele dualismului austro-ungar şi lupta naţională a românilor din Transilvania (1848–1867), Editura Albatros, București, 2000 ISBN 973-24-0691-7 pp. 299–317
- Ardeleanu, Ioan, senior: Alimpiu Barbuloviciu. În: Oameni din Sãlaj. Zalãu, 1938, p. 54.
- * * * Vicarul Alimpiu Barbuloviciu. Jubileul de 50 de ani al Preasfinþiei Sale. În: Gazeta de Duminecã, an 5, nr. 49, 30 nov. 1908, p. 1-3.
- * * * Jubileul vicarului Alimpiu Barbuloviciu. În: Gazeta de Duminecã, an 5, nr. 50, 7 dec. 1908, p. 2-3.
- Toºa, Viorel: Aspecte din viaþa ºi activitatea patriotului sãlãjean Alimpiu Barbuloviciu. În: Acta Musei Porolissensis, vol. VII, Zalãu, 1983, p. 589.
- Perneºiu, Gheorghe: Corespondenþa lui Alimpiu Barbuloviciu cu Vasile Alecsandri. În: Graiul Sãlajului, an 6, nr. 981, 15 sept. 1994, p. 2.
- Grad, Cornel: Oameni din Sãlaj. Alimpiu Barbulovici (1843–1914). În: ªcoala noastrã, an 5, nr. 1, ianuarie-martie 1995.
- Grad, Cornel: Oameni, fapte ºi locuri. Alimpiu Barbuloviciu (1834–1914). În: Limes, an 1, nr. 2–3, 1998, p. 148.
- Gazeta de Duminecã, an 5, nr. 49, 30 nov. 1908, p. 1.
