= Bob Church =

Bob Church may refer to:

People:

- Bob Church (geneticist) (1937–2019), Canadian livestock geneticist

Churches:

- Bob Church, Cluj, a Greek-Catholic church in Cluj-Napoca, Romania
- Bob Church, Mediaș, a Greek-Catholic church in Mediaș, Romania
- Bob Church, Târgu Mureș, a church in Târgu Mureș, Romania

== See also ==
- Robert Church (disambiguation)
