= Coșeriu =

Coşeriu may refer to:

- Eugenio Coșeriu (1921–2002), Romanian-born linguist
- Coşeriu, a village in Urmeniș Commune, Bistrița-Năsăud County, Romania

== See also ==
- Coșeiu, a commune located in Sălaj County, Romania
