= Robert Church =

Robert Church may refer to:

- Robert Bertram Church (1937–2019), Canadian livestock geneticist
- Robert Reed Church (1839–1912), African-American entrepreneur, businessman and landowner from Tennessee
- Robert Church Jr. (1885–1952), heir to his father's business interests and a political organizer
- Robert Church (lacrosse) (born 1991), Canadian lacrosse player on the Edmonton Rush and Saskatchewan Rush

== See also ==
- Bob Church (disambiguation)
