= Bobota =

Bobota may refer to:

- Bobota, Sălaj, a village in Sălaj County, Romania
- Bobota, Croatia, a village near Trpinja, Vukovar-Syrmia County, Croatia
- Bobota Canal, a canal in Croatia
