= Wooden Church, Sighetu Silvaniei =

Church in Sălaj County, Romania

- Biserica de lemn din Sighetu Silvaniei
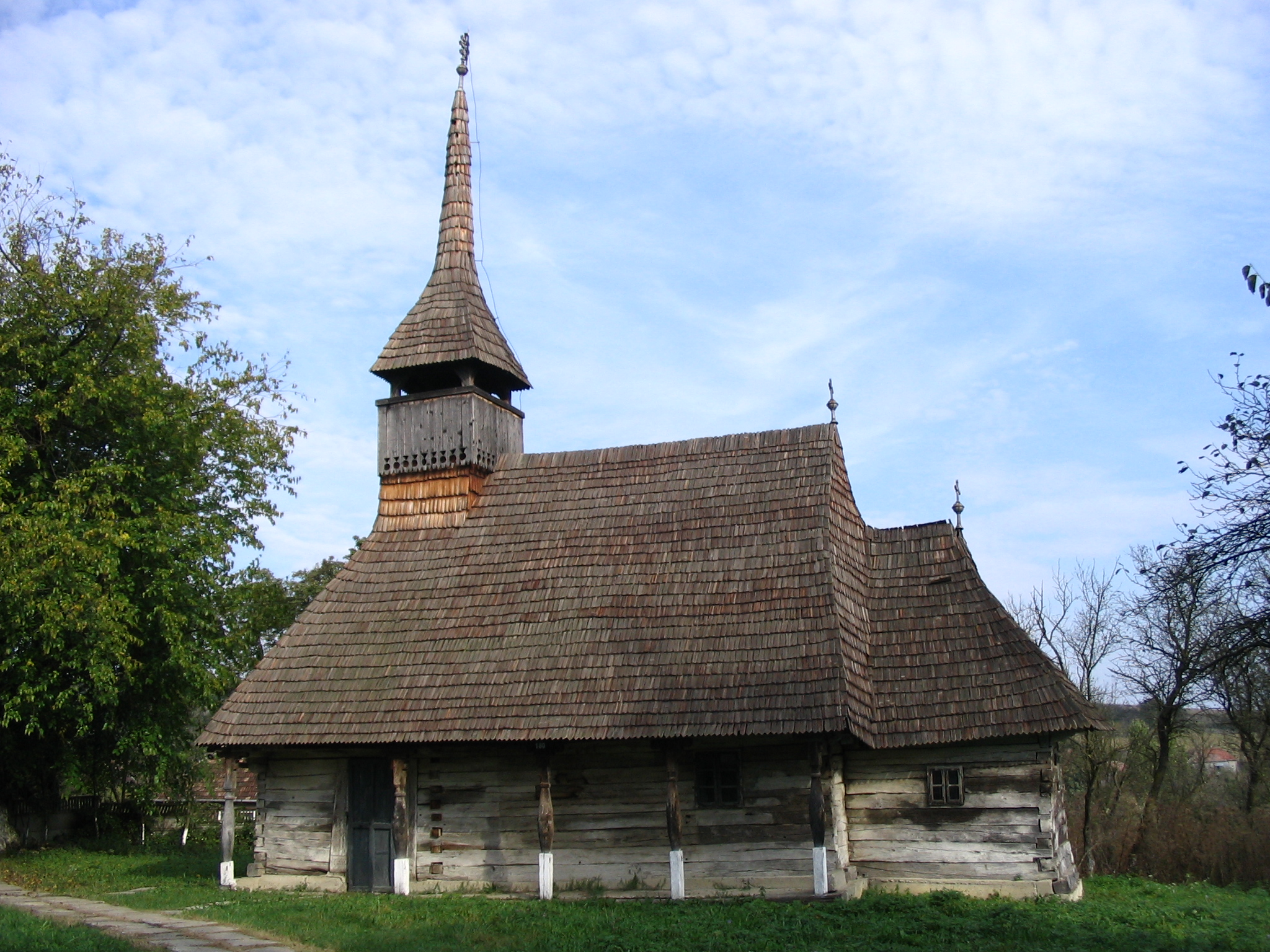

- Romania

Religion
- Region: Sălaj County
- Year consecrated: 18th century

Location
- Location: Sighetu Silvaniei
- Municipality: Chieșd
- State: Romania
- Interactive map of Wooden Church, Sighetu Silvaniei
- Coordinates: 47.34938°N 22.87297°E

The Wooden Church (Romanian: Biserica de lemn din Sighetu Silvaniei) is a church in Sighetu Silvaniei, Romania, built in 1632 in Sălăjeni, Sălaj.

== Bibliography ==
- Cristache-Panait, Ioana (17 August 1978). „Biserica Sf. Arhangheli Mihail și Gavril din Sighetu Silvaniei”. Monumente istorice bisericești din Eparhia Ortodoxă Română a Oradei. Biserici de lemn: 391, Oradea.
- Studii regionale Cristache-Panait, Ioana (17 August 1971). „Bisericile de lemn din Sălaj”. Buletinul Monumentelor Istorice 1971 (1): 31–40.
- Ghergariu, Leontin (17 August 1973). „Meșterii construcțiilor monumentale de lemn din Sălaj”. AMET 1971-73: 255–273, Cluj.
- Godea, Ioan (17 August 1996). Biserici de lemn din România (nord-vestul Transilvaniei). București: Editura Meridiane. ISBN 973-33-0315-1
