= List of places in Târgu Mureș =

The following is a list of notable places in Târgu Mureș, Romania. The city has a wide range of architecture, such as a medieval bastion and buildings in the Secessionist and Art Nouveau styles, including a concert hall and the Palace of Culture.

== Historical places ==
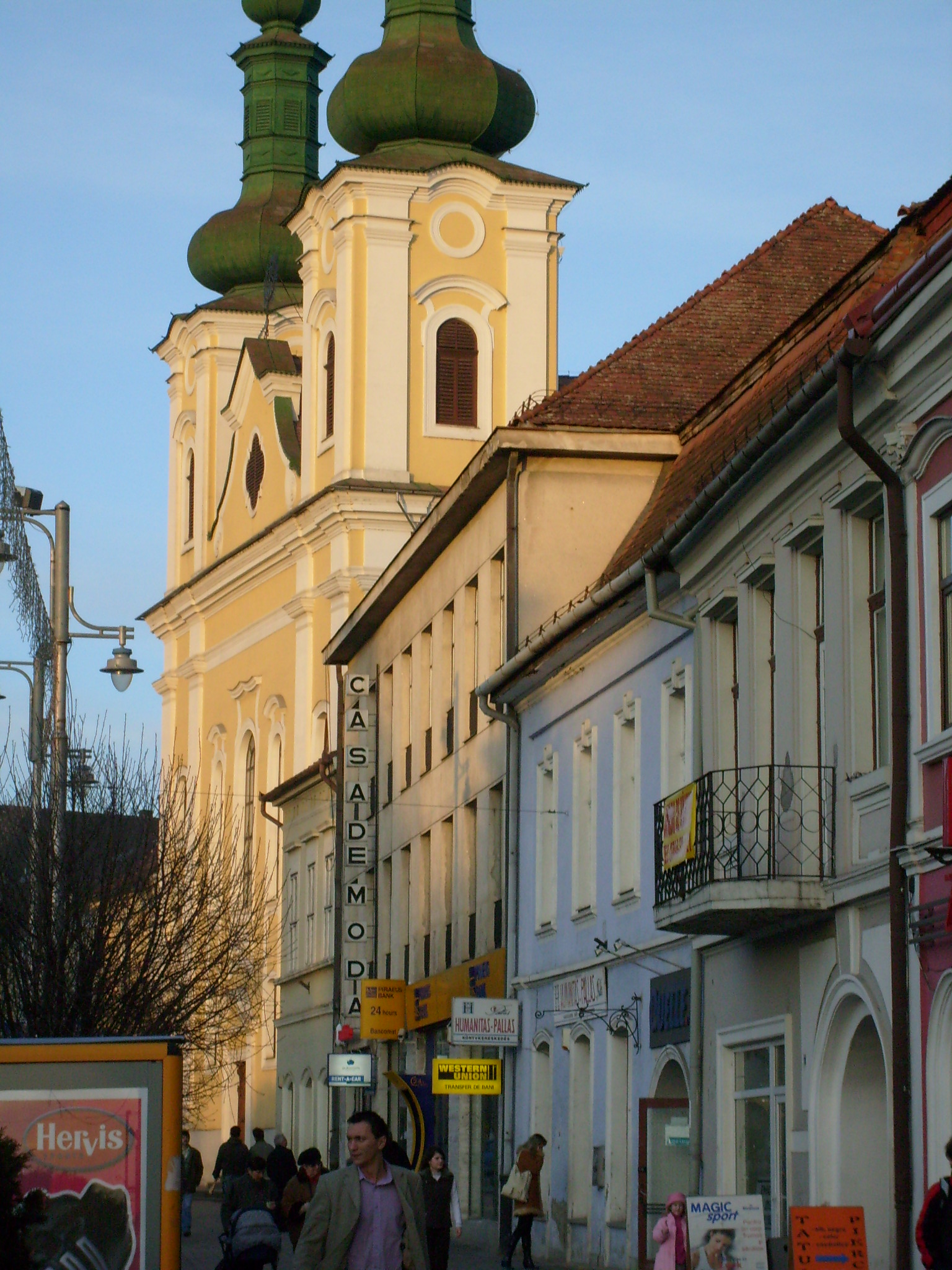
Saint John the Baptist Church

=== Places of worship ===
- Ascension of the Lord Orthodox Cathedral
- Bob Church
- Evangelical Church
- Franciscan Church
- Fortress Church
- Great Synagogue
- Minorita Church
- Nicholas Church
- St. Elisabeth Chapel
- St. John the Baptist Parish Church
- St. John of Nepomuk Church
- Small Reformed Church
- St. Michael Wooden Orthodox Church
- Unitarian Church

=== Historical buildings ===
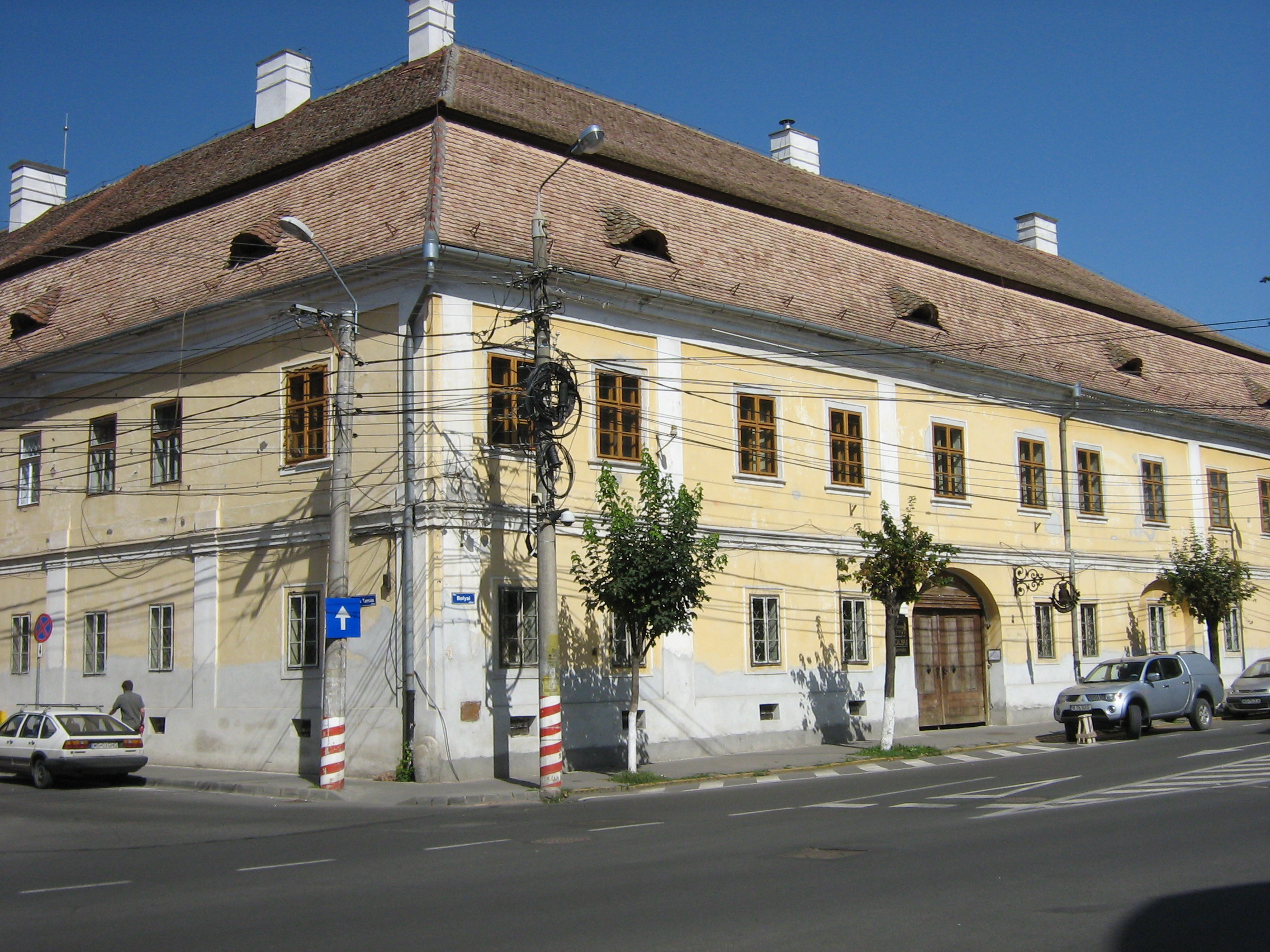
Teleki Library

- Palace of Justice
- Apolló Palace
- Bányai House
- Bissingen House
- Bolyai House
- Culture Palace
- Görög House
- Kendeffy House
- Lábas House
- Legények House
- Teleki Library
- Teleki House
- Toldalagi Palace
- Tolnai House
- Hotel Transzilvánia

=== Statues and historical monuments ===
- Avram Iancu monument (Avram Iancu)
- Bartók Béla Statue (Bartók Béla)
- Bem Józef Statue (Józef Bem)
- Capitoline Wolf Statue (Capitoline Wolf)
- Emil Dandea Statue (Emil Dandea)
- Bolyai Farkas and János Statue (Farkas Bolyai and János Bolyai)
- Aurel Filimon Statue (Aurel Filimon)
- Holocaust Statue (Holocaust)
- Kossuth Lajos Statue (Lajos Kossuth)
- Károly Kós Statue (Károly Kós)
- Kőrösi Csoma Sándor Statue (Sándor Kőrösi Csoma)
- Márton Áron Statue (Áron Márton)
- Michael the Brave statue (Michael the Brave)
- Sándor Petőfi Statue (Sándor Petőfi)
- Szentgyörgyi István Statue (István Szentgyörgyi)
- Székely martyrs' sculpture
