= István Bató =

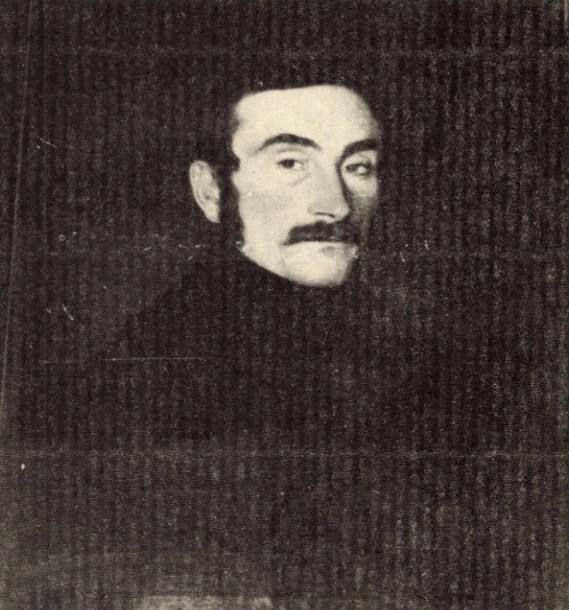

István Bató (1812–1890) was a prominent citizen of the northern Hungarian city of Miskolc in the 19th century. Several local legends are linked to him, and although the citizens of Miskolc are not superstitious, some traditions connected with the curses Bató laid on those who defy his will, remain.

== Background ==
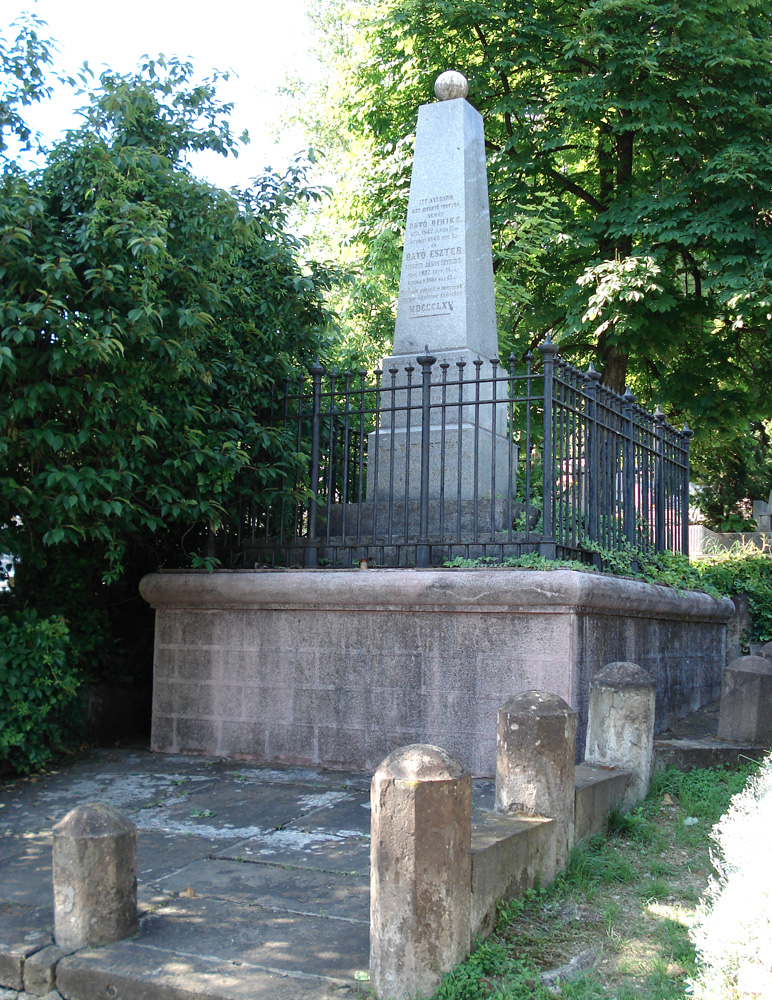
Family tomb of István Bató merchant, Deszka Cemetery, Miskolc, Hungary

Bató was a wealthy wheat merchant. He married a rich girl called Eszter Imre and had two daughters, Eszter (b. 1837) and Borbála (b. 1842). Borbala died in childhood, and Eszter was forced to marry a rich lawyer several years her senior. She died not long after that, on May 13, 1867. Since Eszter wanted to give the nearby Protestant church (the Kossuth Street Church) a bell that would be the largest bell in the city, her family collected all the gold and silver they had, and had a large bell made for the church. However, the church was allowed to ring this bell only once every year, on the anniversary of her death. Hence, the "Eszter bell" became the largest church bell in the city. The inscription on it reads:

To the glory of God and the memory of our dearest daughter Eszter Bató, who was born on 11 September 1837 and died on 13 May 1867; this bell was given for [sic] the Protestant Church of Miskolc by her grieving parents István Bató and his wife Eszter Imre. The bell was made in 1865 by Ignácz Hilczer in Wiener Neustadt, weighs 53 q 68 pounds and cost 4558 Forints.

== Accidents and curses ==
Bató ordered that the door of his daughter's room be opened only once a year, on the anniversary of her death. In 1975, when the original house was demolished for road construction, many accidents occurred on the work site. A memorial room (with the original furniture) was later opened in a house on Kossuth Street, near the church. In the 1990s, when a shopping mall was built close to where Bató's house once stood, it was named Batóház (Bató House).

Bató left a large sum of money to maintain the Wooden Church. He stated in his will that a wooden church has to stand there as long as Protestants live in Miskolc, and cursed everyone who would demolish it. In the 1930s, when the church was so old that it was threatened with collapse and had to be demolished, it was agreed that the new church will be made of wood.
