= Zalău (river) =

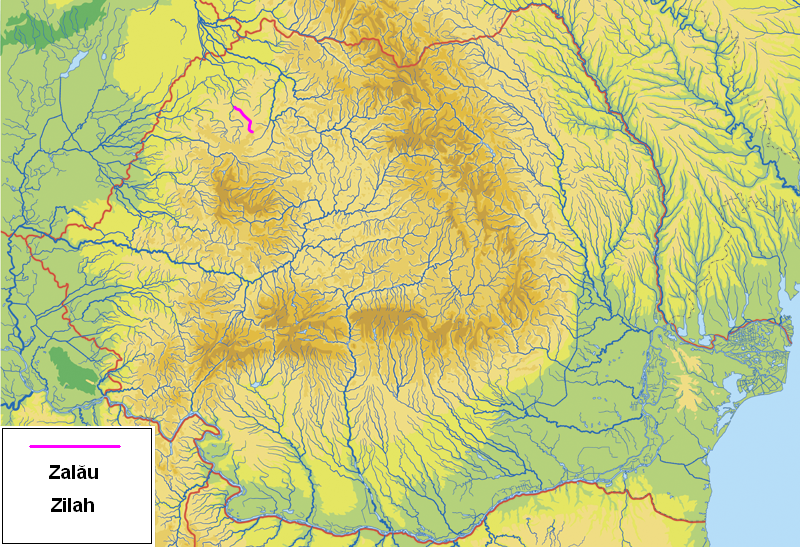

- Location within Romania

Location
- Country: Romania
- Counties: Sălaj County
- Villages: Zalău, Hereclean, Badon, Borla, Bocșa, Sălăjeni, Câmpia, Lompirt, Sărmășag

Physical characteristics
- Mouth: Crasna
  - location: Sărmășag
  - coordinates: 47.3406°N 22.8136°E
- Length: 38 km (24 mi)
- Basin size: 266 km^{2} (103 sq mi)

Basin features
- Progression: Crasna→ Tisza→ Danube→ Black Sea

The Zalău (Hungarian: Zilah-patak) is a right tributary of the river Crasna in northwestern Romania. It flows through the town Zalău. It discharges into the Crasna in Sărmășag. Its length is 38 km (24 mi) and its basin size is 266 km^{2} (103 sq mi).

== Hydronymy ==
There are several hypotheses which have been made regarding the origin of the river's name (or of the town with the same name located on the upper reach of the river):

- the name is derived from the word "silaj", meaning belt in the language spoken by the Eurasian Avars
- the name is derived from the expression "sil es agz", meaning bed of elm trees in Hungarian
- the name is a Hungarian transcription of the "Zillenmarkt", the German name of Zalău city.

== Tributaries ==
The tributaries of the Zalău are:

- left: Valea Miței, Panic, Siciu, Lescuț
- right: Guruslău
