= Carastelec =

Carastelec Kárásztelek
- Commune
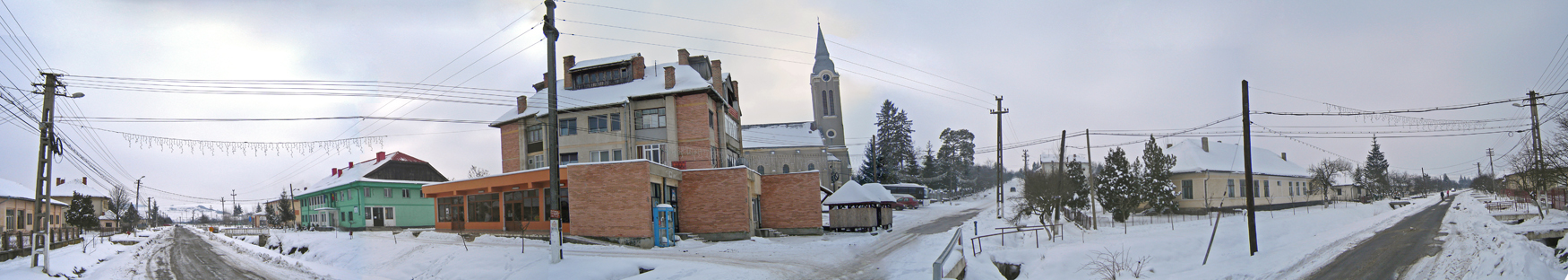

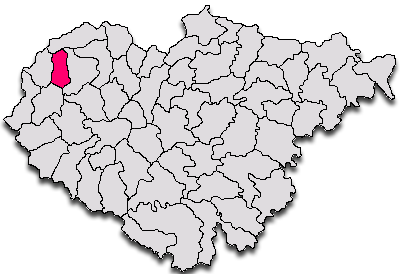
- Location in Sălaj County

- Location in Romania
- Coordinates: 47°18′N 22°42′E
- Country: Romania
- County: Sălaj

Government
  - Mayor (2020–2024): Francisc-Ștefan Faluvégi (UDMR)
- Area: 30.07 km^{2} (11.61 sq mi)
- Elevation: 219 m (719 ft)
- Population (2021-12-01): 1,044
  - Density: 34.72/km^{2} (89.92/sq mi)
- Time zone: UTC+02:00 (EET)
  - Summer (DST): UTC+03:00 (EEST)
- Postal code: 457065
- Area code: +(40) 0260
- Vehicle reg.: SJ
- Website: carastelec.ro

Carastelec (Hungarian: Kárásztelek) is a commune located in Sălaj County, Crișana, Romania. It is composed of two villages, Carastelec and Dumuslău (Szilágydomoszló).

At the 2002 census, the commune had 1,163 inhabitants, of which 90.1% were Hungarians and 9.2% Romanians; 84.2% were Roman Catholic, 9.3% Romanian Orthodox, 3.4% Pentecostal, and 2.8% Reformed. At the 2021 census, Carastelec had a population of 1,044; of those, 80.36% were Hungarians, 12.07% Roma, and 4.79% Romanians.

== See also ==
- Wooden Church, Dumuslău
