= Valea Miței =

Valea Miței Pârâul Miței
- Location within Romania

Location
- Country: Romania
- Counties: Sălaj County
- Villages and cities: Aghireș, Zalău

Physical characteristics
- Mouth: Zalău
  - location: near Zalău
  - coordinates: 47.2285°N 23.0295°E
- Length: 15 km (9.3 mi)
- Basin size: 32 km^{2} (12 sq mi)

Basin features
- Progression: Zalău→ Crasna→ Tisza→ Danube→ Black Sea
- River code: II.2.17.1

The Valea Miței or Pârâul Miței (Hungarian: Micevölgye) is a left tributary of the river Zalău in Romania. It flows into the river Zalău north of the city Zalău. Its length is 15 km (9.3 mi) and its basin size is 32 km^{2} (12 sq mi).
