= Sâg =

- Commune
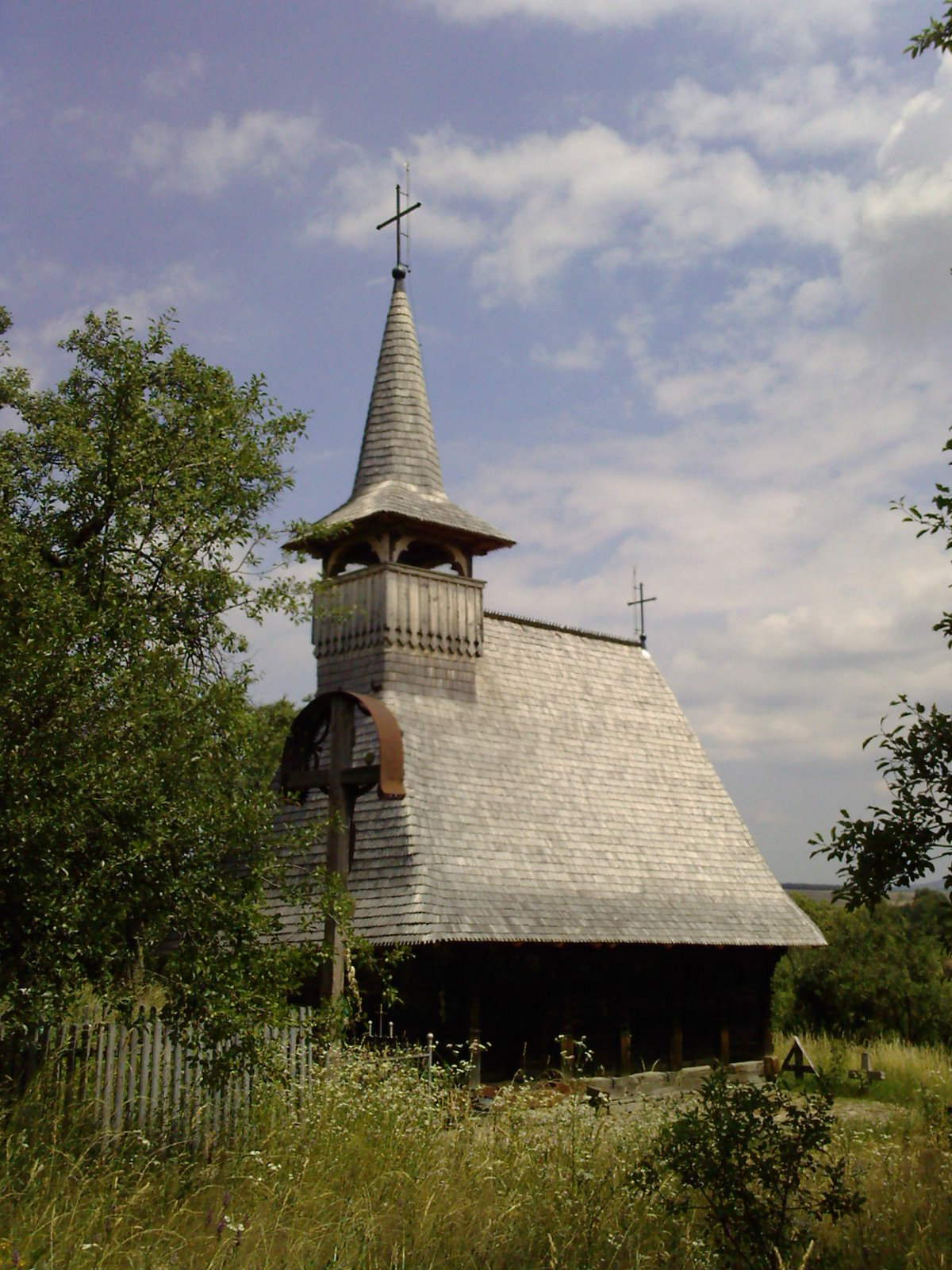
- Wooden church of Sârbi

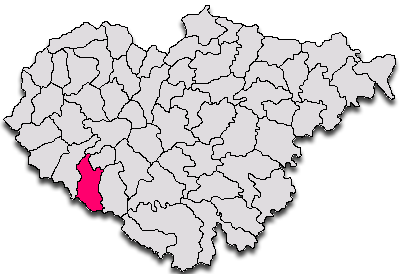
- Location in Sălaj County

- Location in Romania
- Coordinates: 47°4′35″N 22°46′45″E
- Country: Romania
- County: Sălaj

Government
  - Mayor (2020–2024): Florian Bonțe (PSD)
- Area: 87.09 km^{2} (33.63 sq mi)
- Elevation: 337 m (1,106 ft)
- Population (2021-12-01): 3,324
  - Density: 38.17/km^{2} (98.85/sq mi)
- Time zone: UTC+02:00 (EET)
  - Summer (DST): UTC+03:00 (EEST)
- Postal code: 457300
- Area code: +(40) 260
- Vehicle reg.: SJ
- Website: ghidulprimariilor.ro/businesses/primaria-sag/

Sâg (Hungarian: Felsőszék) is a commune located in Sălaj County, Crișana, Romania. It is composed of five villages: Fizeș (Krasznafüzes), Mal (Ballaháza), Sâg, Sârbi (Krasznatótfalu), and Tusa (Tuszatelke).

== Sights ==
- Wooden church in Sâg (built in the 18th century), historic monument
- Wooden church, Tusa (built in the 18th century), historic monument
