= Corneliu Coposu =

Romanian politician (1914 - 1995)

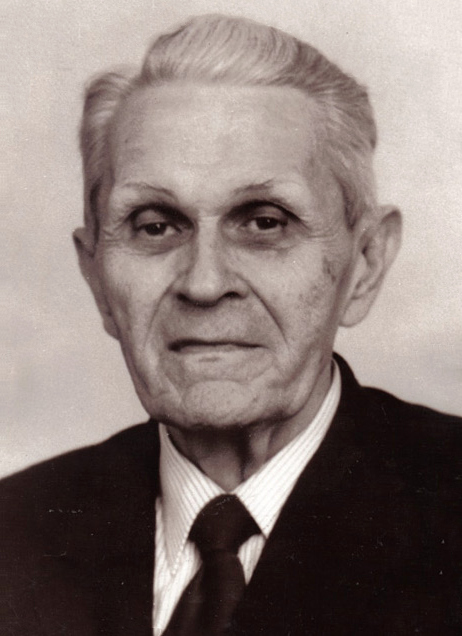

Founding Leader of the Christian Democratic National Peasants' Party
- In office 6 January 1990 – 11 November 1995
- Succeeded by: Ion Diaconescu

Member of the Senate of Romania
- In office 16 October 1992 – 11 November 1995
- Constituency: Bucharest

Leader of the Romanian Democratic Convention
- In office 26 November 1991 – November 1992
- Succeeded by: Emil Constantinescu

Personal details
- Born: 20 May 1914 Nagyderzsida, Szilágy County, Austria-Hungary (today Bobota, Romania)
- Died: 11 November 1995 (aged 81) Bucharest, Romania
- Resting place: Bellu Cemetery, Bucharest; 44.401613°N 26.101934°E
- Party: National Peasants' Party (1932–1947); Christian Democratic National Peasants' Party (1989–1995); Christian Democratic International Party
- Spouse: Arlette Marcovici (m. 1942; died 1966)
- Parents: Valentin Coposu (father); Aurelia Anceanu (mother)
- Education: University of Cluj
- Profession: Lawyer, Politician
- Awards: Legion of Honour

Corneliu (Cornel) Coposu (Romanian: [korˈnelju koˈposu]) (20 May 1914 – 11 November 1995) was a Romanian Christian democratic and liberal conservative politician, the founder of the Christian Democratic National Peasants' Party (Romanian: Partidul Național Țărănesc Creștin Democrat), the founder of the Romanian Democratic Convention (Romanian: Convenția Democratică), and a political detainee during the communist regime. His political mentor was Iuliu Maniu (1873–1953), the founder of the National Peasant Party (PNȚ), the most important political organization from the interwar period. He studied law and worked as a journalist.

== Biography ==
=== Early life ===
Corneliu Coposu was born in Bobota, Sălaj County, at that time in Austria-Hungary (now in Romania), to the Romanian Greek-Catholic archpriest Valentin Coposu (17 November 1886 – 28 July 1941) and his wife Aurelia Coposu (née Anceanu, herself the daughter of Romanian Greek-Catholic archpriest Iuliu Anceanu). Corneliu had four sisters: Cornelia (1911–1988), Doina (1922–1990), Flavia Bălescu (b. 1924), and Rodica (b. 1932).

He too was a devout member of the church and joined the Romanian National Party (PNR), a group dominated by Greek-Catholic politicians – Gheorghe Pop de Băsești was an acquaintance of the Coposu family, and Alexandru Vaida-Voevod was a relative on Corneliu Coposu's mother's side.

After studying Law and Economy at the University of Cluj (1930–1934), he engaged in local politics with the PNR's direct successor, the National Peasants' Party (PNȚ), and worked as a journalist; he wrote for România Nouă, edited by Zaharia Boilă, Mesajul (Zalău), Unirea (Blaj). He became the private secretary of Iuliu Maniu, the leader of the PNR and PNŢ, who had been a leading actor factor in Transylvania's union with Romania (1918), and as head of the Transylvania Directory Council. Coposu wrote in detail about this experience in his "secret diary", discovered after the collapse of communism and published in 2014.

=== World War II ===
Accused of propaganda against the National Rebirth Front (Frontul Renașterii Naționale), Coposu was sent into forced domicile in Bobota. After the Second Vienna Award of August 1940, when Romania was forced to cede Northern Transylvania to Hungary, Coposu moved to Bucharest. He became the political secretary of Maniu, the leader of the clandestine opposition to Marshal Ion Antonescu, and the leader of the anti-Nazi resistance in Romania. Maniu was contacted by representatives of the British authorities, and Coposu was one of his trusted assistants; the group maintained contacts between the Romanian politicians who were negotiating the country's exit from the alliance with the Axis powers, in order to join the Allies (USA, UK, USSR) (an alternative kept by the Antonescu government). In his "secret diary", Coposu explained the role of Iuliu Maniu as the main organizer of the coup d'état against Antonescu.

In 1945, after the royal coup against the Antonescu regime, Coposu became deputy secretary of the PNȚ and, after the reintegration of Northern Transylvania, the party's delegate to the leadership of provisional administrative bodies. He was also active in organizing the party as the main opposition to the Communist Party and the Petru Groza cabinet before the 1946 general election.

=== Communist persecution ===
The communist regime established and controlled by the Soviets, arrested him on 14 July 1947, together with all the leadership of the National Peasants' Party, after some of the party leadership had allegedly tried to flee the country in a plane landed at Tămădău (see Tămădău Affair). His mentor, Iuliu Maniu, the leader NPP, the most important political organization in Romania, received a life sentence in a show trial. Maniu died in 1953, in the infamous Sighet Prison, but his death certificate was released only eight years later. Coposu was imprisoned without trial for nine years, as all charges brought against him were dismissed due to lack of evidence. Coposu later attested that his imprisonment, imposed by Soviet officials overseeing the Securitate, was among those causing a stir in the higher echelons of the Communist Party. Belu Zilber, a Communist who was purged together with Lucrețiu Pătrășcanu, later told him that prominent party politician Ana Pauker had unsuccessfully opposed the move in front of Gheorghe Gheorghiu-Dej.

In 1956, Coposu was sentenced to life imprisonment for "betrayal of the working class" and "crime against social reforms". In April 1964, he was freed after 15 years of detention and 2 years of forced residence in Rubla (Brăila County), having spent, in all, 17 years of incarceration in 17 notorious detention and hard labor facilities associated with the communist regime, including Sighet Prison, Gherla Prison, Jilava Prison, Râmnicu Sărat Prison, Pitești Prison, and the Danube–Black Sea Canal (where he was imprisoned with his friend and collaborator Șerban Ghica).

Coposu later testified having been impressed by the deep scars collectivization had left in the country, as well as by the resilience of the Rubla deportees (see Bărăgan deportations) — "They traded in vegetables they had grown themselves while locals could not be convinced that these could actually grow on the Bărăgan". In the 1990s, during debates over the overall number of victims of the Communist regime between 1947 and 1964, Coposu spoke of 282,000 arrests and 190,000 deaths in custody.

After his release, Coposu started work as an unskilled worker on various construction sites (given his status as a former prisoner, he was denied employment in any other field), and was subject to Securitate surveillance and regular interrogation. After the collapse of communism, Tudor Călin Zarojanu published large excerpts from the huge Securitate file on Corneliu Coposu, kept for decades by the secret communist political police

His wife Arlette was also prosecuted in 1950 during a rigged espionage trial, and died in 1966, soon after her release, from an illness contracted in prison.

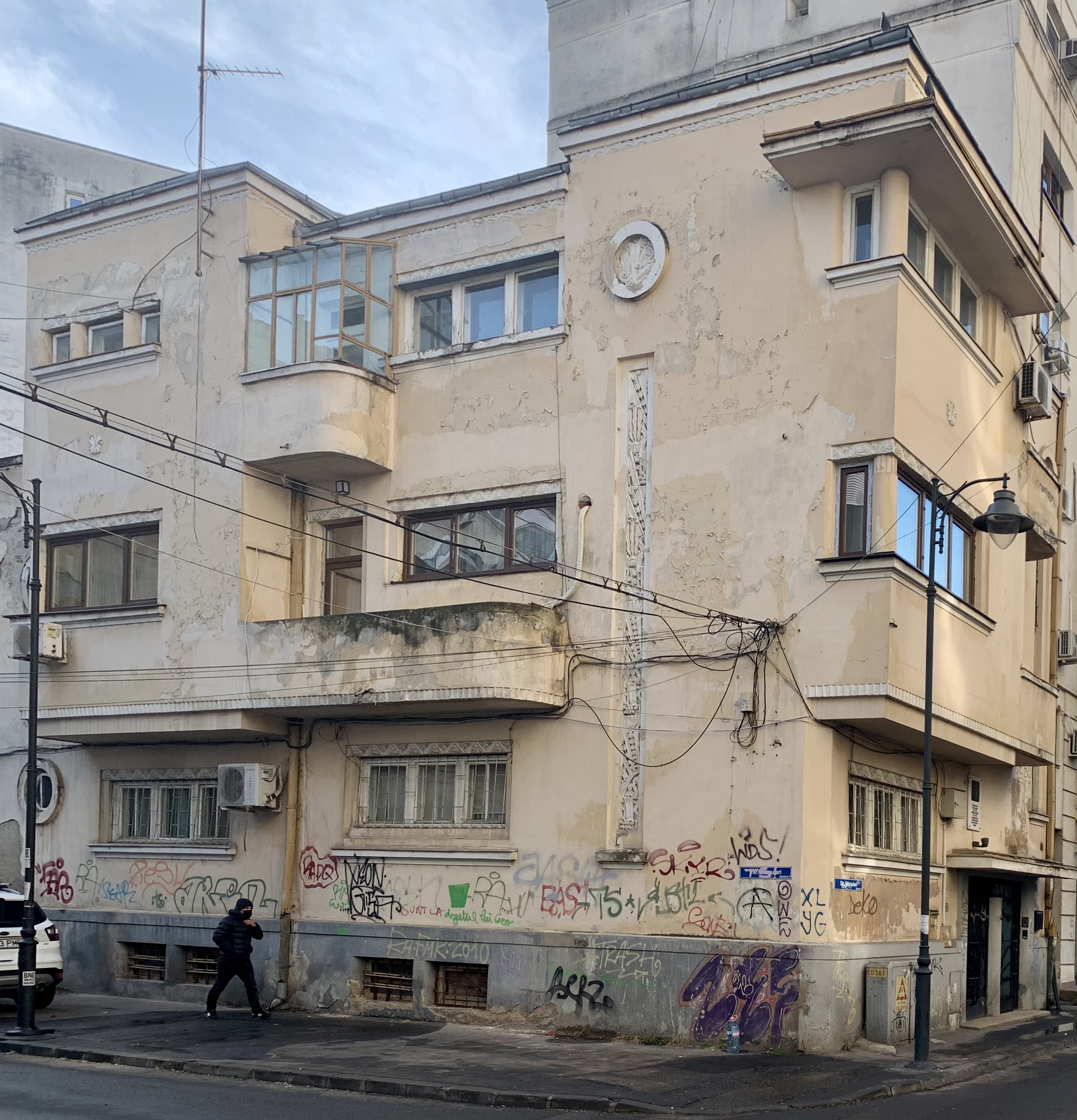
The Art Deco block in which Corneliu Coposu has lived between 1975 and 1995, Strada Mămulari no. 19 (Bucharest, not far off the Union Square)

Coposu managed to keep contact with PNȚ sympathisers, and re-established the party as a clandestine group during the 1980s, while imposing its affiliation to Christian Democracy and the Christian Democrat International.

=== Post-communism ===
On 22 December 1989, (during the Romanian Revolution), he and prominent members of the party issued a manifesto that confirmed the PNȚ's entry into legality, under the name Christian Democratic National Peasants' Party (PNȚ-CD).

For the rest of his life, Coposu was the main voice of the opposition to the National Salvation Front (from 1992, the Democratic National Salvation Front). Present at his party's headquarters, he was targeted during the January 1990 Mineriad (the first of the Mineriads) on 28 January 1990. The Prime Minister Petre Roman addressed the angry mob who wanted to lynch Coposu and the other leaders of the democratic opposition, pretending to mediate the conflict. In an attempt to create a resemblance between how the dictator Ceaușescu exited the armored vehicle before his trial and Coposu's flight, under the pretext of protecting Coposu from the angry crowd, Roman commissioned an armored vehicle to drive him to the headquarters of the Romanian National Television, where Roman promised Coposu that he could make a statement which would be aired later that day. The statement was recorded but it did not air. No copy of the recording was ever found in the archives.

Coposu successfully grouped various organizations into the Romanian Democratic Convention (CDR), of which he was the leader between 1991 and 1993. He was elected to the Senate of Romania in the 1992 general election. In 1995, the government of France granted him the Grand Officier de la Légion d'Honneur during a ceremony in Bucharest.

Regarding Emil Constantinescu's election as the CDR's candidate for the presidential office in 1992, Coposu stated: "The candidate was elected in an absolutely democratic manner. The appointment of the candidate of the Democratic Convention for the position of president of the country was made according to the most authentic democratic rules. All five candidates had the moral stature and prestige to honor the highest magistracy of the country. We, the Democratic Convention, wish the only candidate, elected by the vote of the 67 major presidential electors, to succeed in the elections and to achieve his first goal, which is the eradication of communism in Romania."

== Death ==
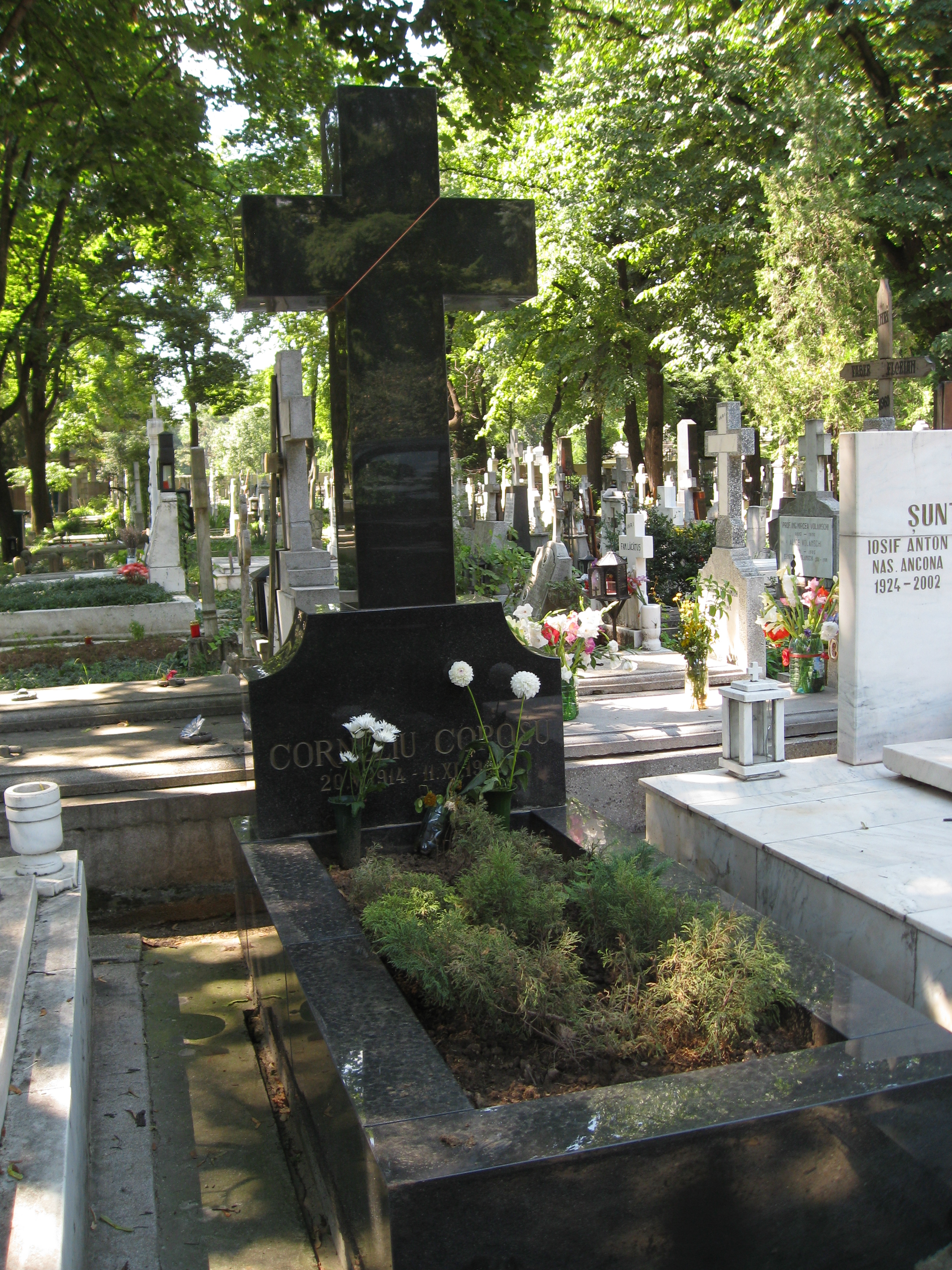
His grave at Bellu Catholic Cemetery

He died in Bucharest while undergoing treatment for lung cancer. Some 100,000 people attended his funeral three days later. He was buried in the Catholic section of Bellu Cemetery.

One of the main thoroughfares in the capital now bears his name. A bust of Coposu stands next to Kretzulescu Church, in Revolution Square.

In a 2006 poll conducted by Romanian Television to identify the "greatest Romanians of all time", Coposu came in 39th.
