= Wooden Church, Tusa =

Heritage site in Sălaj County, Romania

- Biserica de lemn din Tusa
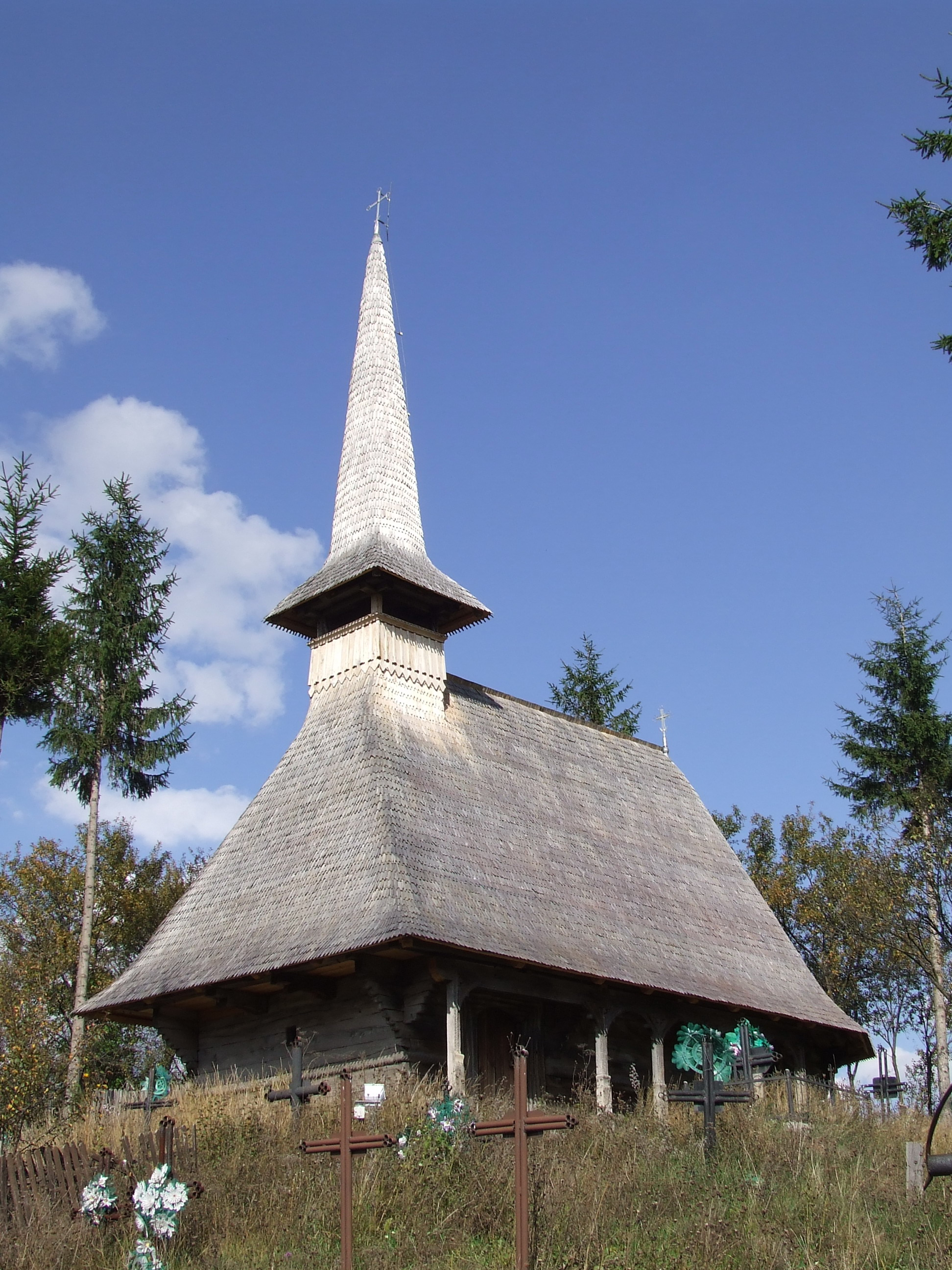

- Romania

Religion
- Affiliation: Christian
- Region: Sălaj County
- Ecclesiastical or organizational status: parish church
- Year consecrated: 18th century
- Status: Museum

Location
- Location: Tusa
- Municipality: Tusa
- State: Romania
- Interactive map of Wooden Church, Tusa
- Coordinates: 47.04625°N 22.77649°E

The Wooden Church (Romanian: Biserica de lemn din Tusa) is a church in Tusa, Sâg, Romania, built in the 18th century.
