= Bobota, Sălaj =

Bobota
- Commune
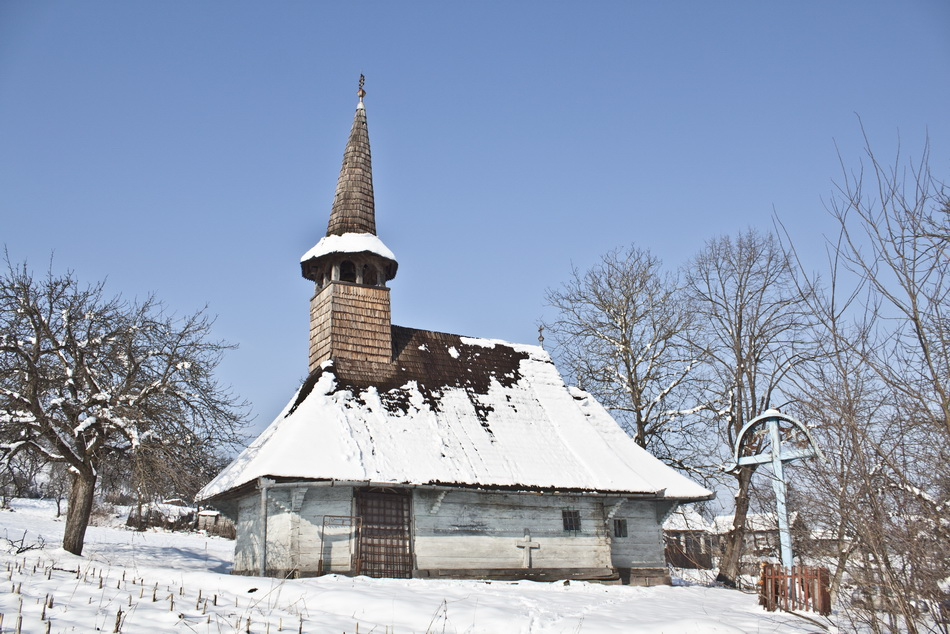
- Wooden church in Zalnoc

- Location in Sălaj County

- Location in Romania
- Coordinates: 47°23′N 22°46′E
- Country: Romania
- County: Sălaj

Government
  - Mayor (2020–2024): Dorin-Ioan Gorgan (PSD)
- Area: 73.24 km^{2} (28.28 sq mi)
- Elevation: 184 m (604 ft)
- Population (2021-12-01): 3,527
  - Density: 48.16/km^{2} (124.7/sq mi)
- Time zone: UTC+02:00 (EET)
  - Summer (DST): UTC+03:00 (EEST)
- Postal code: 457040
- Area code: +40 x60
- Vehicle reg.: SJ
- Website: www.primariabobota.ro

Bobota (Hungarian: Nagyderzsida) is a commune located in Sălaj County, Crișana, Romania. It is composed of three villages: Bobota, Derșida (Kisderzsida), and Zalnoc (Zálnok).

The commune is located in the northwestern part of Sălaj County, 23 km (14 mi) from Șimleu Silvaniei and 35 km (22 mi) from the county seat, Zalău, on the border with Satu Mare County.

== Sights ==
- Wooden Church, Derșida, built in the 18th century, historic monument
- Wooden Church, Zalnoc, built in the 17th century, historic monument

== Natives ==
- Corneliu Coposu (1914–1995), politician, the founder of the Christian Democratic National Peasants' Party and of the Romanian Democratic Convention, and a political detainee during the communist regime
- Clara Maniu (1842–1929), feminist and suffragist
