= Coșeiu =

Coșeiu Kusaly
- Commune
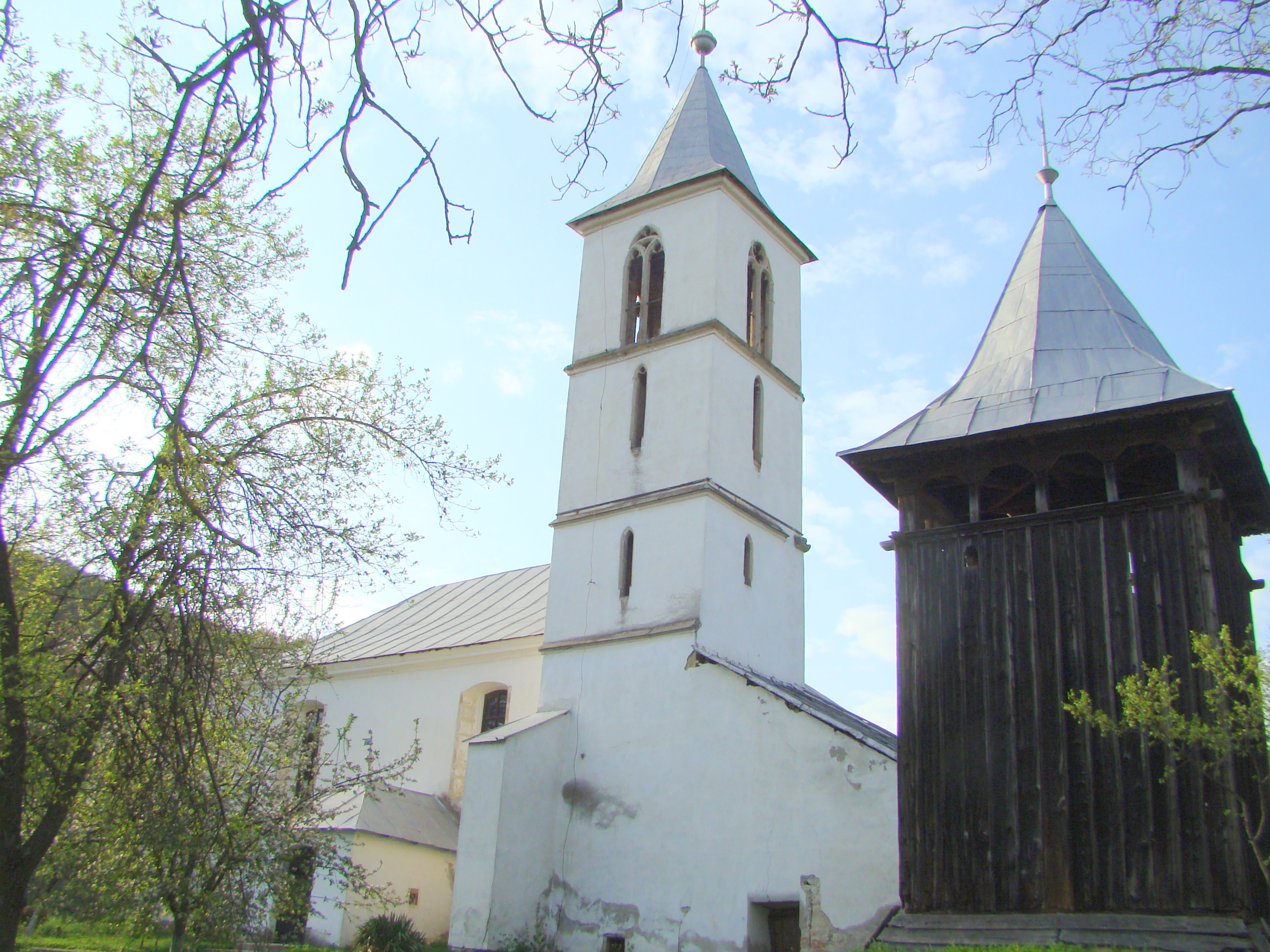
- Reformed church in Coșeiu village

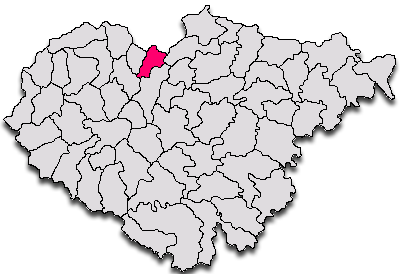
- Location in Sălaj County

- Location in Romania
- Coordinates: 47°19′8″N 22°59′34″E
- Country: Romania
- County: Sălaj

Government
  - Mayor (2020–2024): Dezideriu Debreczeni (UDMR)
- Area: 34.32 km^{2} (13.25 sq mi)
- Elevation: 289 m (948 ft)
- Population (2021-12-01): 1,110
  - Density: 32.3/km^{2} (83.8/sq mi)
- Time zone: UTC+02:00 (EET)
  - Summer (DST): UTC+03:00 (EEST)
- Postal code: 457080
- Area code: +(40) 260
- Vehicle reg.: SJ
- Website: www.primariacoseiu.ro

Coșeiu (Hungarian: Kusaly) is a commune located in Sălaj County, Crișana, Romania. It is composed of three villages: Archid (Szilágyerked), Chilioara (Szilágykirva), and Coșeiu.

== Population ==
In 1910, the majority of the inhabitants (811) were Romanian, with a significant Hungarian minority. In 1992, along with its neighboring villages, out of 1,409 inhabitants, 721 were Romanians, 672 Hungarians, and 16 were Roma. At the 2002 census, 50.4% of inhabitants were Hungarians] 47.5% Romanians, and 2.1% Roma. 48.6% were Romanian Orthodox, 33.3% Reformed and 16.6% Baptist. At the 2011 census, the commune had 1,198 inhabitants; of those, 51% of were Hungarians, 46.16% Romanians, and 2% Roma. At the 2021 census, Coșeiu had a population of 1,110, of which 50.63% were Hungarians, 40.09% Romanians, and 4.59% Roma.

== History ==
Coșeiu is located about 18 km (11 mi) from the county seat, Zalău. The earliest document to mention it dates to 1345, where it is called Kusal. In 1432 Kwsal, 1450 Kwssal, 1505 Kwssaly, 1549 Kwsaly, 1591 Kusalj, Kussally, Kusaj, and in 1805 it was written as Coșeiu. Kusaly was the ancient estate of the Jakcsi family, the name is taken from here. The kusalyi Jakcs have risen fast, having held high offices in the coming centuries. Among the Jakcs descendants — where the family name came from — George became the main royal treasurer in 1400; another of his children, Michael, between 1414 and 1428 Michael, later in 1437 he was the Voivode of Transylvania, then the espouse of Szekelyz. In 1444 Michael Jackh was also a Transylvanian voivode.

The family acquired estates in several counties, and held high offices in: Sălaj, Satu Mare, Szabolcs, and Bereg counties as well. For example, in 1430 the Lord Lieutenant of Satu Mare County was Laszlo Jakcs. In 1526, Michael Kusalyi Jackh attended the national assembly of Rakosi ambassador as the Diet of Bereg County. The family name appears in documents in 1345 for the first time, and in the 1700–1800 years on the hilltops of the settlements traces of their castle can be seen. In 1635, György Rákóczi Kusalyban II donated a portion an estate to Stephan Serédi Krasna county lord lieutenant, the estate and the mansion soon became the property of the disloyal Mihaly Szénási, the captain of the field army. In 1701 April 19, King Leopold I donated the Kusalyi estate to baron Peter Serédi.

== Natives ==
- Alimpiu Barboloviciu (1843 – 1914), cleric

== Sights ==
- Reformed Church in Coșeiu, built in the 15th century historic monument
