= Simion Bărnuțiu =

Romanian historian, academic, philosopher, jurist, and liberal politician

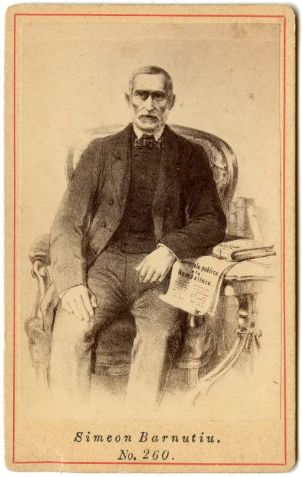
- Born: 21 July 1808; OláhbaksaKingdom of Hungary, Austrian Empire (Modern day Romania)
- Died: 28 May 1864 (aged 55); Fântâna Gorgana, Sânmihaiu Almașului, Kolozs County, Principality of Transylvania, Austrian Empire
- Resting place: Saint Mary Church in Bocșa; 47°17′56″N 22°55′10″E
- Education: List: Normal School of Șimleu Silvaniei (1817–1820); Catholic Gymnasium of Carei (1820–1825); Theological Seminary of Blaj (1826–1830); Saxon Academy of Law of Sibiu (1846–1848); Faculty of Law of Vienna (1850–1852) University of Pavia (6 June 1854)
- Occupations: Historian, philosopher, jurist
- Known for: Transylvanian Revolution of 1848
- Relatives: Ioan Maniu (Nephew); Iuliu Maniu (Grandnephew)

Simion Bărnuțiu (Romanian pronunciation: [simiˈon bərˈnut͡sju]; 21 July 1808 – 28 May 1864) was a Romanian historian, academic, philosopher, jurist, and liberal politician. A leader of the 1848 revolutionary movement of Transylvanian Romanians, he represented its Eastern Rite Catholic wing. Bărnuțiu lived for a large part of his life in Moldavia, and was for long a professor of philosophy at Academia Mihăileană and at the University of Iași.

== Biography ==
=== Early activities ===
He was born in Bocșa (Hungarian: Oláhbaksa), Szilágy County, Transylvania (now in Sălaj County, Romania). He became a teacher of history at the secondary school in Blaj, which was at the time, like the rest of Transylvania, part of the Austrian Empire. Bărnuțiu was influenced early-on by the philosophy of Immanuel Kant (Kantianism), in which he saw the means to reform society in opposition to traditional theological views.

He was an active contributor to Foaie pentru minte, inimă și literatură, the literary supplement of George Bariț's journal Gazeta de Transilvania, he became noted after 1842 for virulently opposing the decision of the Magyar-dominated Transylvanian Diet to give Hungarian a status of a semi-official language in local administration of Transylvania(see History of Transylvania).

In 1843, following widespread support of reform within Transylvanian christian communities regarding clerical representation of its members, Bărnuțiu advocates for the abolition of unilateral administrative power in the church, on the side of a democratic structure electing its leaders, able of directly participating in the social conditions of Romanians.

On 24 March 1848, Bărnuțiu issued one in a series of appeals by various authors, calling for self-determination of Romanians inside Transylvania, viewing it as a necessary step in matching Magyar success in obtaining rights from Emperor Ferdinand I, and professing that Romanians should reject the projected union of the region with the Kingdom of Hungary until ensured proportional representation and the official condemnation of serfdom. Concerning his ideals of national identity cited in 1872 by the Transylvanian faction of the Austrian, student composed, România Jună Society, in opposition to prominent Romanian authors Ioan Slavici and Mihai Eminescu, Bărnuțiu writes on the importance of moderation in favor of the liberation of Romanians in Transylvania, commends national identity as the most relevant social factor, calls for church legislative intervention for Romanians in Transylvania, and avows the Romanian national identity as directly succeeding that of the Roman Empire.

=== Blaj Assemblies and National Committee ===
The Blaj Assembly convened in April on the basis of such proclamations gathered together intellectuals, clergy, and commoners.

Bărnuțiu gave several speeches in front of the Assembly, calling for patience and moderation while continuing to campaign against all unilateral change in Transylvania's government and disagreeing with more skeptical political leaders, such as Bariț and Andrei Șaguna, and finally being persuaded to include an oath of allegiance to the Emperor in his political strategy. Just before the Second Assembly in May, he agreed to moderate his tone further, taking in view the points made by Bariț in regard to the fragile situation facing Romanians in the region, and partly reformulated his program on self-determination. On 17 May, he was elected vicepresident of the Permanent Committee formed by Blaj delegates as a supervising body (one presided by Șaguna), later the basis of the National Romanian Committee.

The rapid succession of events after the proclamation of Transylvania's union with the Hungarian Kingdom (11 July) and of Hungary's independence (27 September), with an Austrian military debacle in Transylvania, saw a rapprochement between the loyalist Austrian Anton Freiherr von Puchner, nominal governor of the region, and Bărnuțiu's Committee. From the committee's perspective, this was an Austrian recognition of Transylvania's self-government as a Romanian region, which was to be advanced to the new emperor Franz Josef.

=== In Moldavia and Romania ===
After Imperial Russian intervention in Transylvania, he decided to go into exile, and settled in Iași, Moldavia's capital. He wrote several treaties on law and philosophy (including a passionate defense of Roman law), and, before and after the union of the Danubian Principalities under Domnitor Alexandru Ioan Cuza advocated radical reforms which were a direct inspiration to the Moldavian liberal dissidents grouped as Fracțiunea liberă și independentă. In the 1850s, Bărnuțiu wrote against the popular project of electing a foreign prince as ruler of the Principalities, an opposition which Fracțiunea carried into the Constituent Assembly following the toppling of Cuza two years after Bărnuțiu's death. Junimea, a conservative literary society created during that period, criticized him along with other Transylvanian intellectuals (such as Timotei Cipariu, Gheorghe Șincai, and August Treboniu Laurian) for having supported a Romanian grammar and alphabet based on Latin etymologies instead of one reflecting the spoken language (at the time, "Latinist" influences following Transylvanian guidelines had come to be favoured by the Romanian Academy).

After having fallen gravely ill, Simion Bărnuțiu asked to be allowed to return to his native village. He died on the way there, in Hida.
