= Bocșa, Sălaj =

Bocșa Oláhbaksa
- Commune
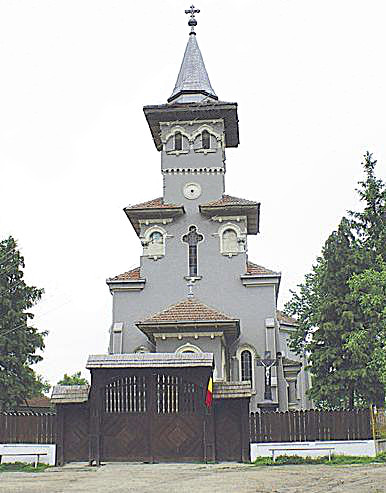
- Greek-Catholic Church in Bocșa, where the mausoleum of Simion Bărnuțiu is located

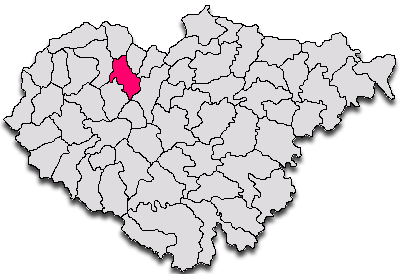
- Location in Sălaj County

- Location in Romania
- Coordinates: 47°17′41″N 22°54′49″E
- Country: Romania
- County: Sălaj
- Established: 1349 (recorded)

Government
  - Mayor (2020–2024): István Demyen (UDMR)
- Area: 47.34 km^{2} (18.28 sq mi)
- Elevation: 203 m (666 ft)
- Population (2021-12-01): 3,169
  - Density: 66.94/km^{2} (173.4/sq mi)
- Time zone: UTC+02:00 (EET)
  - Summer (DST): UTC+03:00 (EEST)
- Postal code: 457045
- Area code: +(40) 0260
- Vehicle reg.: SJ
- Website: www.comunabocsa.ro

Bocșa (Hungarian: Oláhbaksa) is a commune located in Sălaj County, Crișana, Romania. It is composed of four villages: Bocșa, Borla (Szilágyballa), Câmpia (Somlyómező) and Sălăjeni (Ököritó).

== Tourism ==
In addition to the area's scenery, such as Dealul Măgurii, there are two buildings with historical value: the former building of the commune hall in Bocșa (1937–1938) and a house in Câmpia built in the 18th century. The church in Câmpia was consecrated in 1935 by Valeriu Traian Frențiu.

The former building of the commune hall in Bocșa became the Simion Bărnuțiu memorial house in 1985. The memorial house is also a showcase of the history of Bocșa. In front of the museum is a bust of Bărnuțiu.

Another bust of Bărnuțiu (created by the artist Horea Flămându) was placed in the Central Park of Bocșa in 1967.

The brick church was consecrated in 1941. The remains of Bărnuțiu and those of a local Catholic clergyman, Alimpiu Barboloviciu, are placed in the church from Bocșa.

== Geography ==
With a land area of 47.34 km^{2} (18.28 sq mi), Bocșa is situated in the Zalău River Basin. The Zalău River flows through Bocșa. Bocșa village is situated at 18 km (11 mi) from Zalău city, and at 16 km (9.9 mi) from the projected Transylvania Motorway.

== Demographics ==
According to 2002 census, the total population of the commune counted 3,463 inhabitants, of which 51.54% were Romanians, 39.79% Hungarians, 8.63% Romani, and 0.04% are other ethnicities.

== Economy ==
The economy of the commune is primarily agricultural. It is known as an important wine-producing area, with approx. 167 ha vine-lands. The wine of Borla is well-known even abroad.

== History ==
Bocșa was first mentioned in documents in 1349 under the name Villa Baxa. In 1854, its name became Olah-Baksa or Bocșa Română. Borla was first mentioned in 1341, Câmpia in 1427 and Sălăjeni 1430.

After the conquest of the region by the Habsburgs, the inhabitants of Bocșa became, in majority, Greek Catholic. Communist government imposed a return to the Orthodox faith and a brick church replaced the ancient wooden church of Sighetu Silvaniei. At the end of the 1930s, the wooden church was transported to the Village Museum in Bucharest.

One notable Bocșa native is the scholar Simion Bărnuțiu, a historical figure and hero who fought for popular sovereignty in the 19th century. He was one of the leaders of the Transylvanian revolution in 1848–49. Bărnuțiu contributed to the development of the philosophic, politic and legal way of thinking of his people. He had lectures for pupils and students and some of his main works are still timely.

The settlements from Neolithic, Dacian state and the early Feudal period were found at the archeological site of Pietriș.

In the western part of Bocșa, toward Lompirt, on the Zalău River Valley, was found a prehistoric settlement and a pre-Feudal one.

== Villages ==
=== Borla ===
The first written source about the village dates back to 1341 and refers to it under the name of Barla. Allegedly Barla is an allusion to "barlang" (i.e. cave), where inhabitants used to retreat from waves of Tatar invasions. Excavations, however, revealed that the area was populated already in the Bronze Era, and some artifacts are even dated back to the Neolithic Era. The Szilágy-prefix was assigned when the train station was built in 1913, referring to the county.

Around 1450, the village was the property of the Bishop of Várad (Oradea), who participated on the side of Hunyadi in the battle of Belgrade, and fell hostage to the Turks. Afterwards the village was owned mostly by the Bánffy family until the early 20th century.

Borla is inhabited mainly by Reformed ethnic Hungarians, although Baptists and Romanian Orthodox are present, as well as Roma and a few ethnic Romanians.

Local education has its roots in church-owned educational institutions, with written records as of 1852. The present school was built in 1970, mainly by local effort. The old school building is used as nursery school. Classes are held mainly in Hungarian, except for the Roma community, for which one aggregate class of the first elementary grades is maintained in Romanian. Afterwards pupils travel to the school in neighboring Bocşa.

Viticulture is the traditional occupation, with the soil allegedly more acidic than in other parts of the county (Sărmășag and Șamșud), which produces a more mature and full tasting wine than its local competitors.

== Politics ==
=== 2012 election ===
The Bocșa Council, elected in the 2012 local government election, is made up of 11 councilors, with the following party composition: 6-Democratic Union of Hungarians in Romania, 6-Social Liberal Union, and 1-Democratic Party.

Party	Seats	2012 Bocşa Council
Democratic Union of Hungarians in Romania	6	
Social Liberal Union	6	
Democratic Party	1	

=== 2008 election ===
Party	Seats	2008 Bocşa Council
Democratic Union of Hungarians in Romania	5	
National Liberal Party	5	
Democratic Party	2	
Social Democratic Party	1	

=== 2004 election ===
The mayor Ioan Barou was elected for the first time in 2004 local government election as a member of the National Liberal Party and re-elected in 2008 and 2012.

Party	Seats	2004 Bocşa Council
Democratic Union of Hungarians in Romania	4	
Social Democratic Party	4	
National Liberal Party	3	
Democratic Party	2	

=== Mayors ===
- Vasile Popițiu (1872–1946) served as the mayor during the interwar period.
- Ioan Șamșudan was elected as the mayor in 1996 and 2000.
- Ioan Barou (b. 12 February 1975) was elected in 2004, 2008, and 2012.

== Notable residents ==
- Simion Bărnuțiu (1808–1864), historian, academic, philosopher, jurist, and liberal politician
- Alimpiu Barboloviciu (1843–1914), Greek Catholic priest
