= Wooden Church, Bocșa =

Church in Sălaj, Romania (1750–1937)

- Biserica de lemn din Bocșa
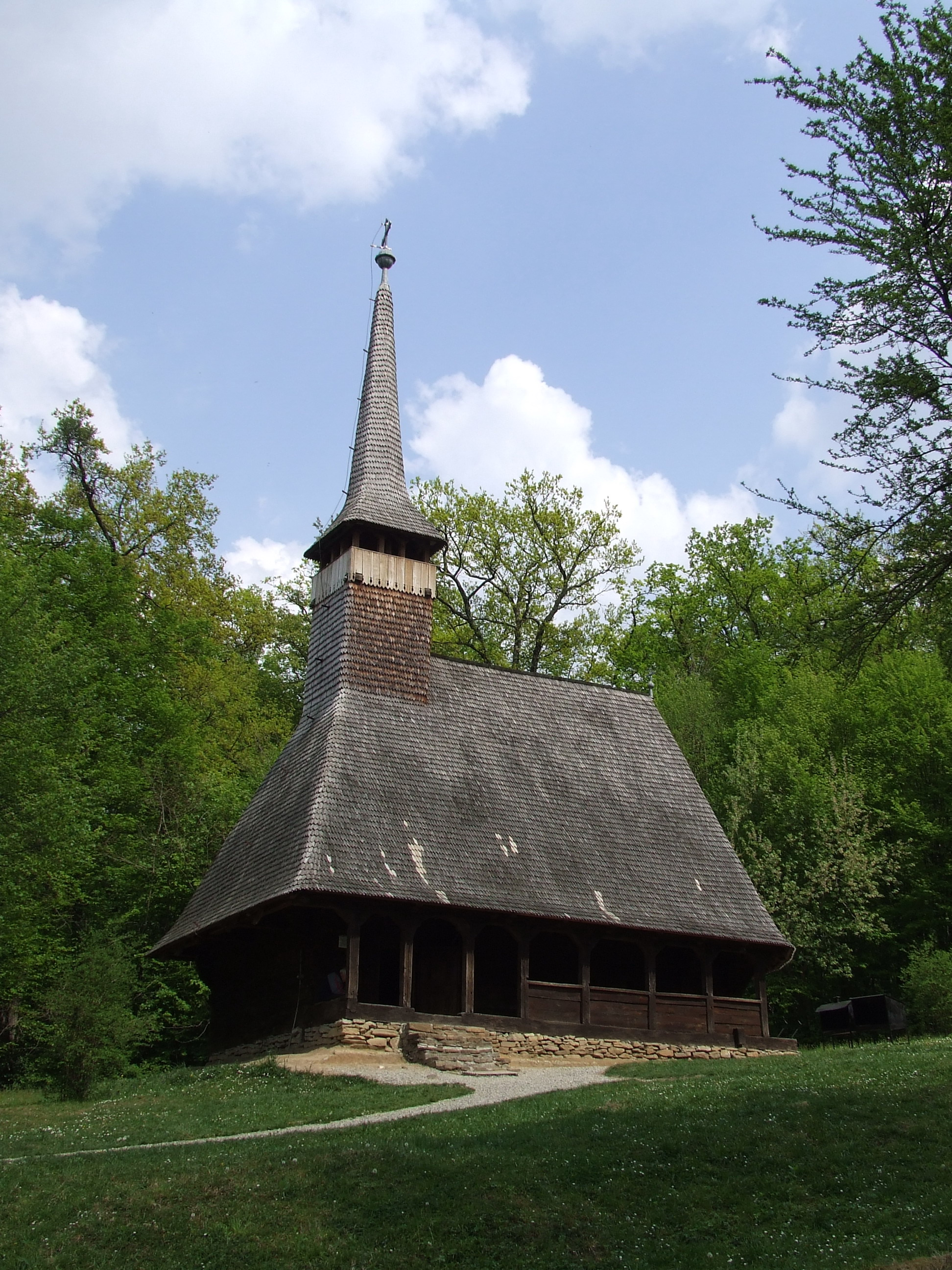

- Romania

Religion
- Affiliation: Eastern Catholic
- Region: Sălaj County
- Ecclesiastical or organizational status: parish church
- Year consecrated: 1750

Location
- Location: Bocșa, Sălaj
- Municipality: Bocșa, Sălaj
- State: Romania
- Interactive map of Wooden Church, Bocșa
- Coordinates: 47.298889°N 22.919444°E

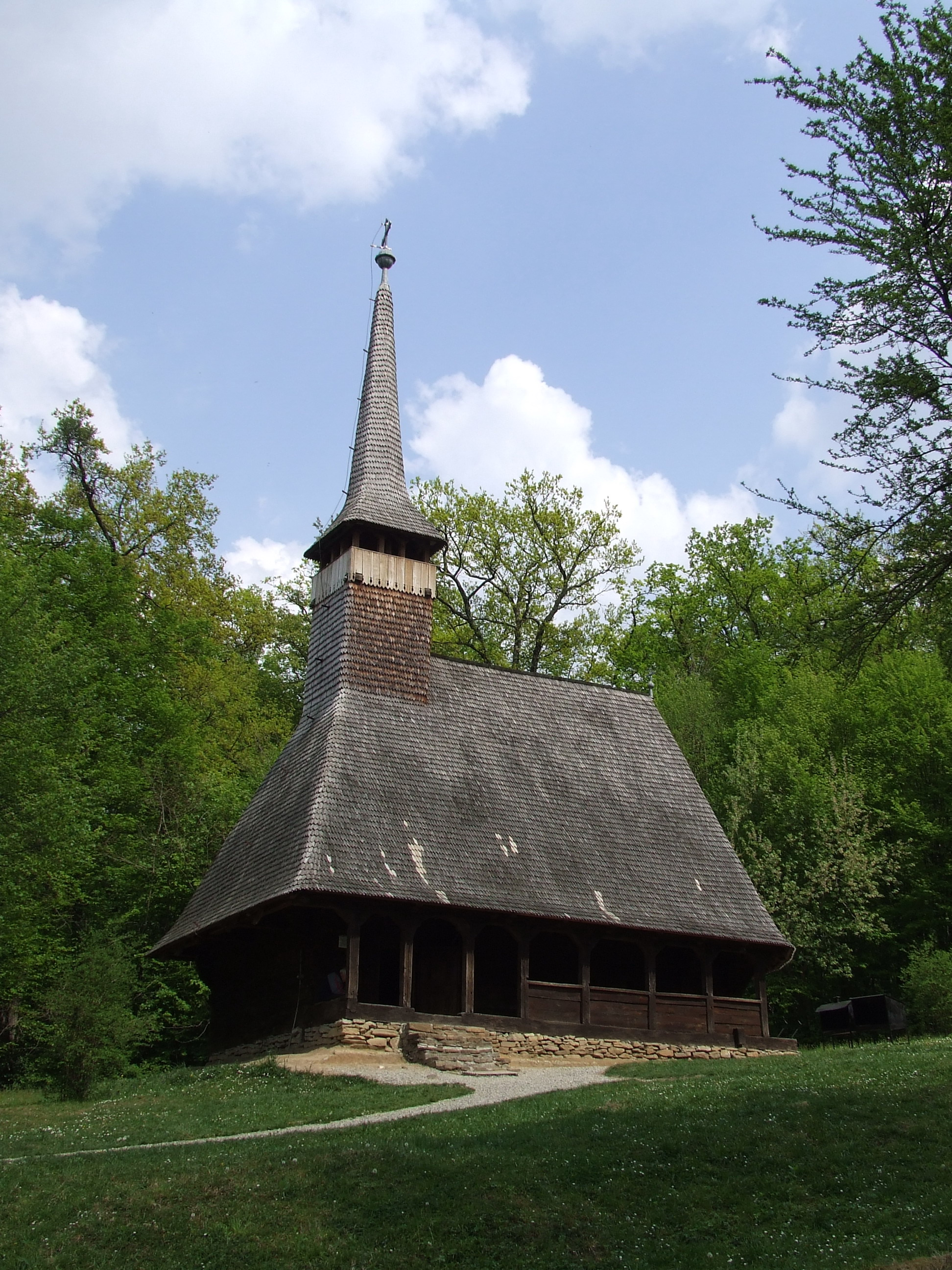

The Wooden Church (Romanian: Biserica de lemn din Bocșa) was a church in Bocșa, Sălaj, Romania, built in 1750 and demolished in 1937.

== Bibliography ==
- Leontin Ghergariu, „Biserici de lemn din Sălaj”. manuscris în Arhivele Naționale din Zalău, colecția personală Leontin Ghergariu.
