= Wooden Church, Dumuslău =

Church in Dumuslău, Romania

- Biserica de lemn din Dumuslău
- Romania

Religion
- Affiliation: Romanian Greek-Catholic Church
- Region: Sălaj County
- Rite: Greek-Catholic
- Ecclesiastical or organizational status: parish church
- Year consecrated: 1792

Location
- Location: Dumuslău
- Municipality: Dumuslău
- State: Romania
- Interactive map of Wooden Church, Dumuslău
- Coordinates: 47.333333°N 22.666667°E

The Wooden Church (Romanian: Biserica de lemn din Dumuslău) was a church in Dumuslău, Romania, built in 1792 and demolished in 1935.

== Bibliography ==
- Leontin Ghergariu (14 August 1976). „Biserici de lemn din Sălaj”. manuscris în Arhivele Naționale din Zalău, colecția personală Leontin Ghergariu (actul 11 din 1976).
