= Wooden Church, Miskolc =

Reformed Church of Miskolc-Tetemvár
- Miskolc-tetemvári református templom (Hungarian)
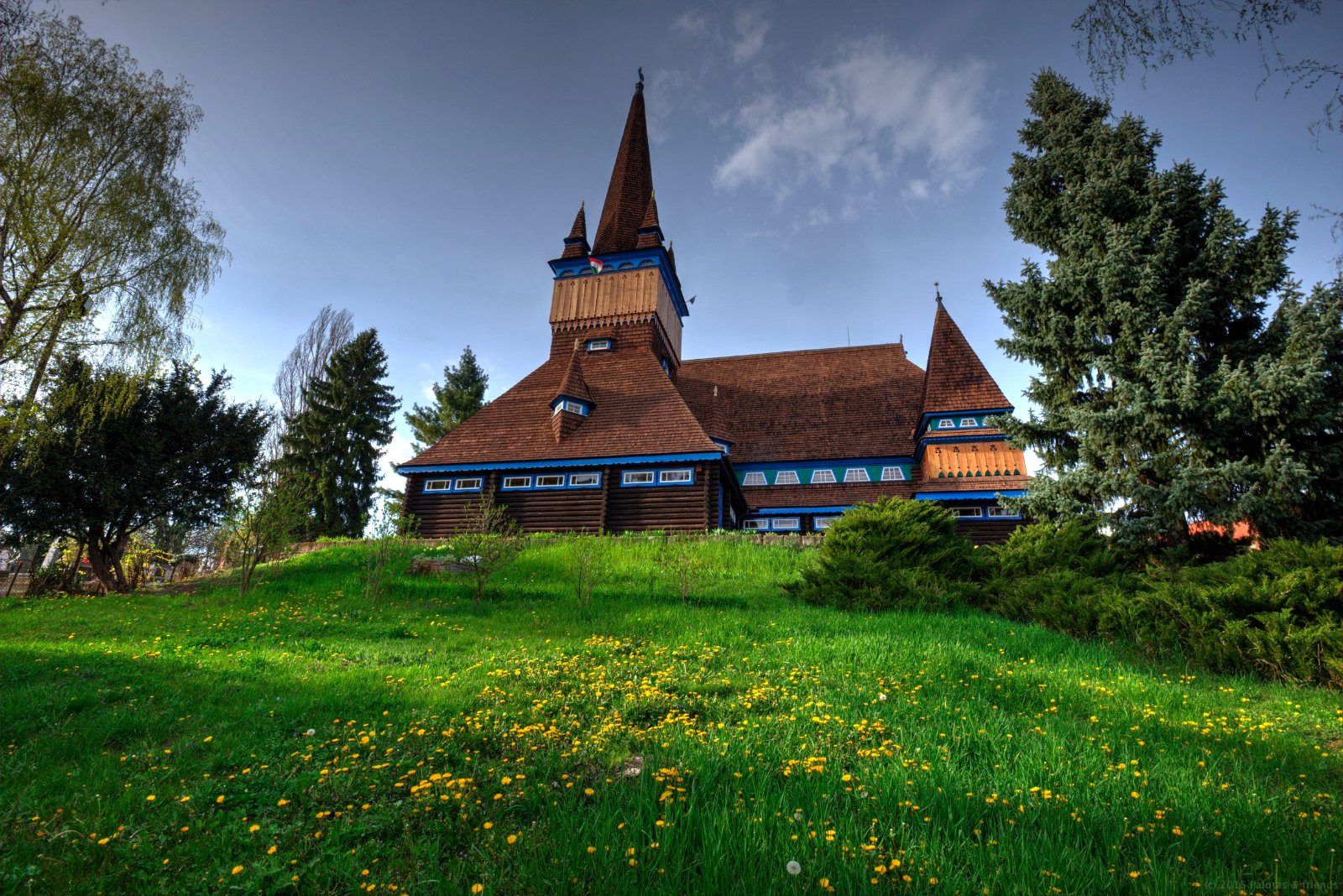

- Location within Hungary
- 48°06′53″N 20°47′15″E
- Location: Miskolc
- Country: Hungary
- Denomination: Reformed
- Website: aloldalak.tirek.hu/deszkatemplom/

History
- Status: Church
- Consecrated: September 13, 1637 (first church on this site); May 2, 1999 (current building)
- Events: Built in 1724; Demolished in 1937; Rebuilt in 1938; Destroyed by arson on December 4, 1997; Rebuilt in 1998–1999

Architecture
- Functional status: Active

Administration
- District: Cistibiscan Church District
- Parish: Reformed Congregation of Miskolc-Tetemvár

The Reformed Church of Miskolc-Tetemvár (Hungarian: Miskolc-tetemvári református templom), simply just Wooden Church (Deszkatemplom, lit. "wooden plank church") is a Protestant church in Miskolc, Hungary. It is built of carved wood. The present building was built in 1999 in place of the previous one that was destroyed by arson in 1997.

== History ==
=== First church ===
Three wooden churches had previously stood on the site of today's church. The first church was consecrated on September 13, 1637, but both this date and the existence of the church are preserved only in tradition and there is no documentary evidence. The first document mentioning a church at this site dates back to 1698. This church was built of wood, but nothing else is known about it.

=== Second church ===
The first church known by the name of 'Wooden Church' was built in 1724 and it stood until 1937. A total of 117 planks were used to construct the side walls (which is likely why, from that point on, the church came to be known as the "wooden plank church"). The building was designed with a T-shaped floor plan, which made it possible to increase its capacity without disturbing the surrounding graves in the cemetery. By the 1780s, the Reformed community had grown so large that the two Reformed churches in Miskolc (the Church of Avas and the Wooden Church) could no longer meet the demand, except by holding two consecutive services at each location. The problems were only solved by the construction of a third Reformed church in Miskolc, which was completed by the end of 1808.

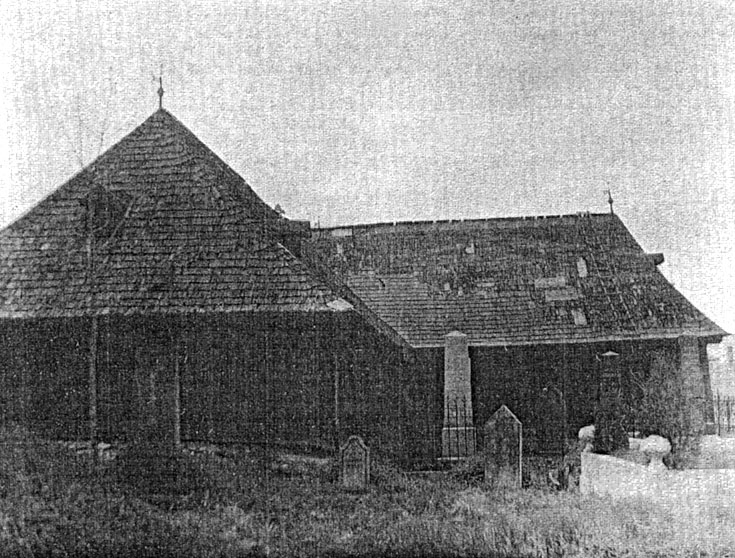
The wooden church, slated for demolition, in the 1930s

By 1874, the Wooden Church had become a danger to life, and the Reformed Church lacked the funds to repair it. István Bató, a 19th-century citizen of Miskolc left a large sum to the church. As long as there are Protestants in Miskolc, this wooden church should be kept in good condition... should it burn down, it should be rebuilt of wood, he wrote in his will. The work was completed quickly, the rafters and support posts were replaced, and the shingling was restored.

By the end of the 1920s, the church had once again fallen into disrepair; everything from the foundation to the roof had rotted away. On September 11, 1937, the citizens of Miskolc said farewell to the church during a farewell service.

=== Third church ===
The church council announced a competition, stating that any licensed architect of the Reformed faith who is a member of the Chamber of Engineers may participate. The new church was designed by Bálint Szeghalmy. It was made entirely of wood brought from Transylvania, an area with long traditions of wood-carving, and the design also had Transylvanian elements. The cornerstone of the new Wooden Church was laid on September 26, 1937. The construction was finished by 1938.

At 3:00 AM on December 4, 1997, a police patrol that had arrived at the scene in response to an alarm from the burglar alarm system, along with a witness, notified the fire department that they had spotted a fire on the southwest side of the church. Burning pieces of the roof that fell into the church destroyed the furnishings, pews, and religious artifacts. The fire was caused by a mentally disturbed arsonist. The court acquitted him because he was not aware of the consequences of his actions.

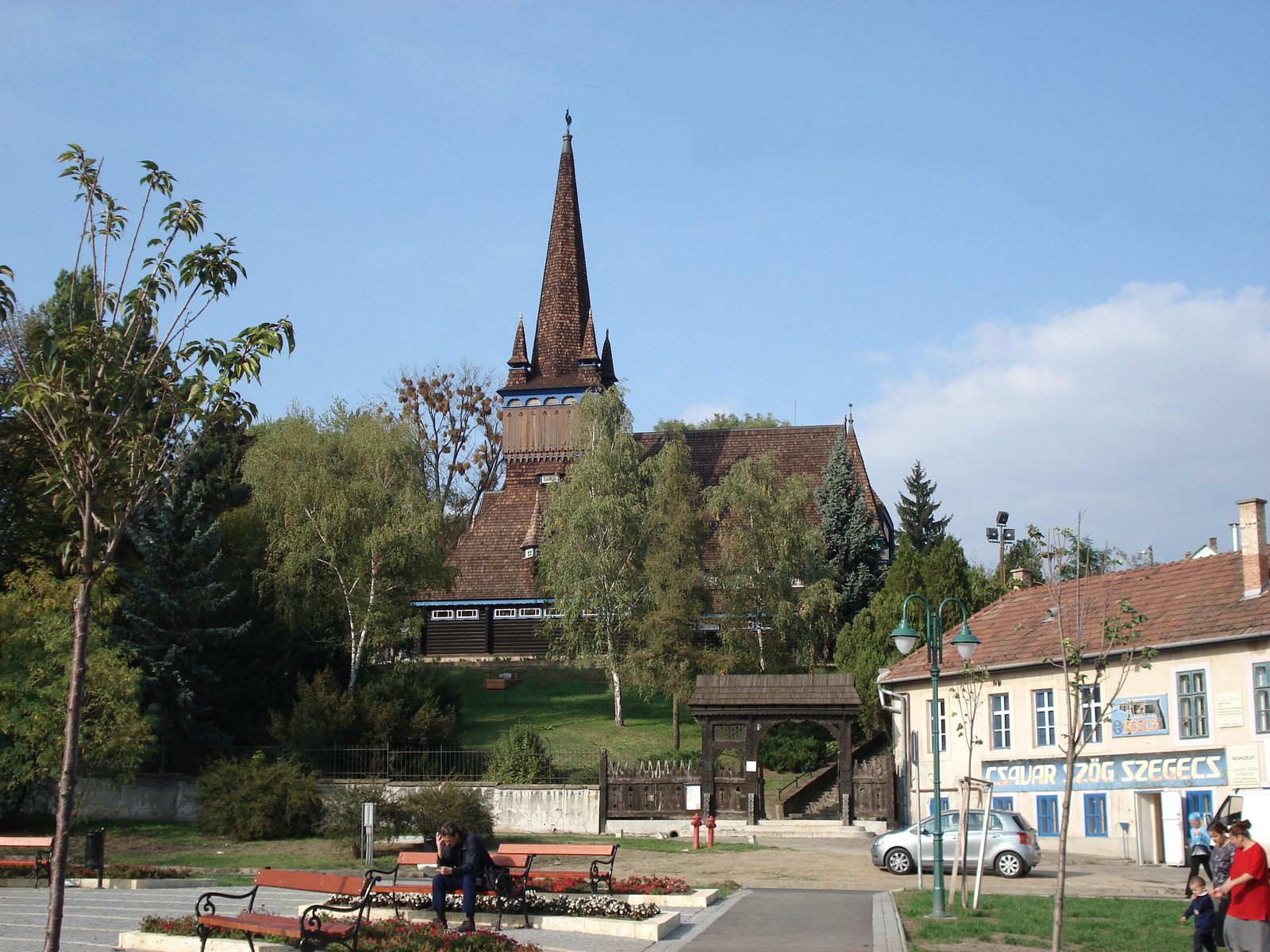
The rebuilt church from Petőfi Square

=== Fourth church ===
Immediately after the fire, a public fundraising campaign was launched. The Roman Catholic bishop of the Diocese of Spiš donated timber for the roof boarding. Citizens of the city and the congregation were unanimous in their opinion that they did not want a church with a new design, but rather that the burned-down church should be rebuilt.

The wooden structures inside the building are made of larch, while the rest is made of pine and spruce. The spruce came again from Transylvania. The decorations were crafted by woodcarvers from Cernat in Transylvania. During the construction great attention was paid to fire safety: the wood was treated with UV, fungicide, and fire retardant protection. The bell consecration ceremony was held on September 18, 1998, on the sixtieth anniversary of the third church’s dedication in 1938. The consecration ceremony for the church took place on May 2, 1999.

== See also ==
- Reformed Church in Hungary
- Church of Avas
- Miskolc

== Gallery ==
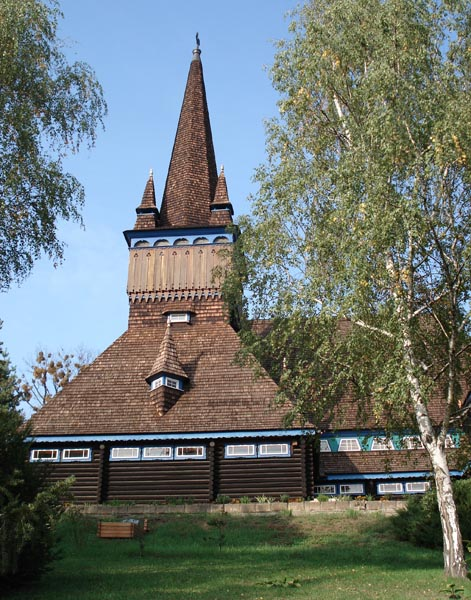

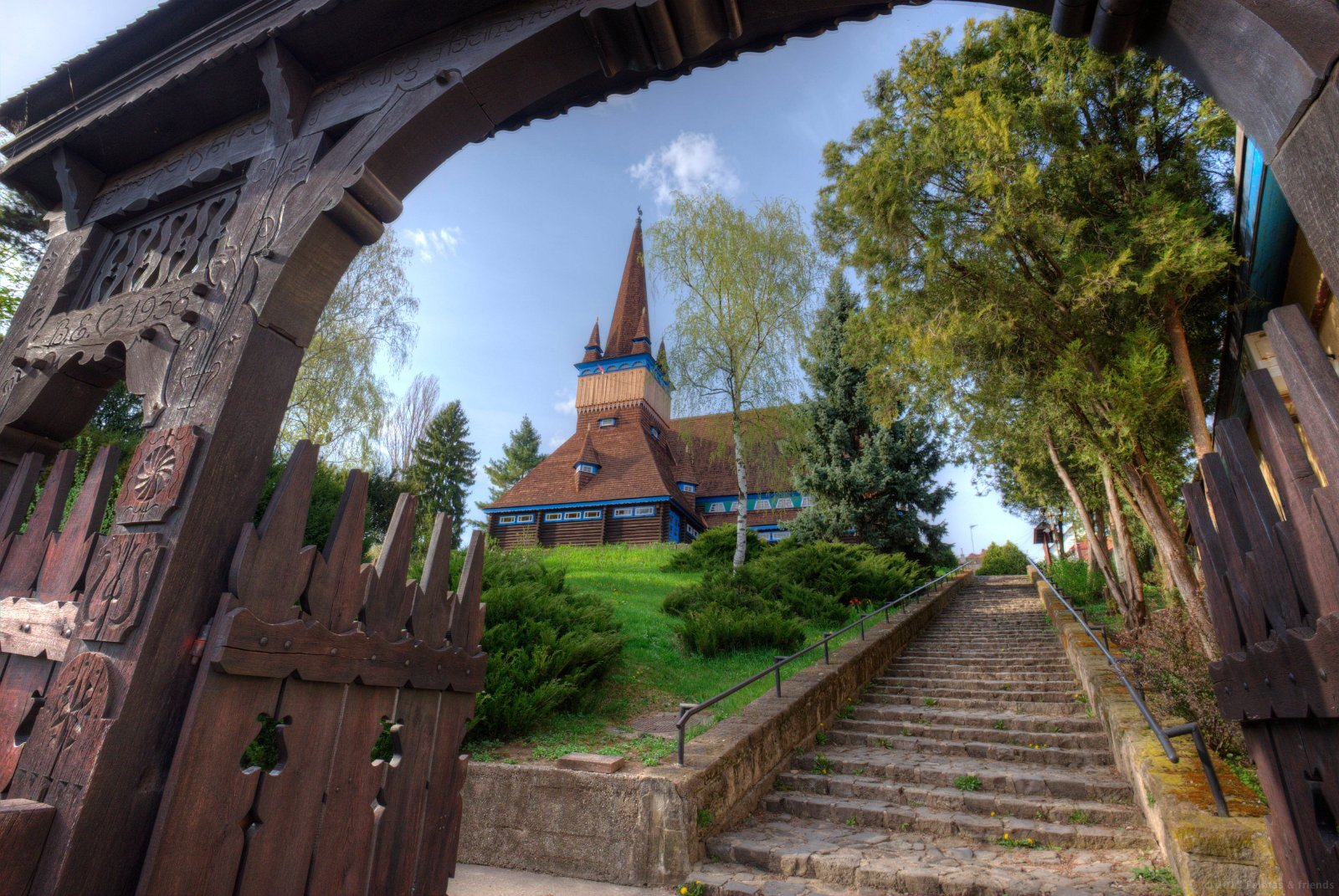

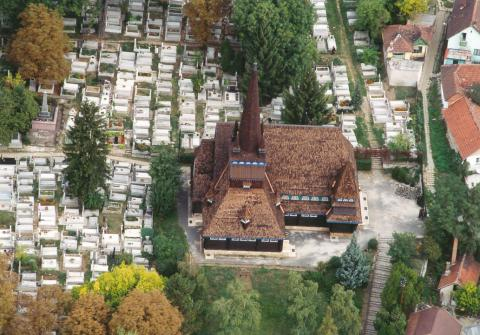
