= Chieșd =

- Commune
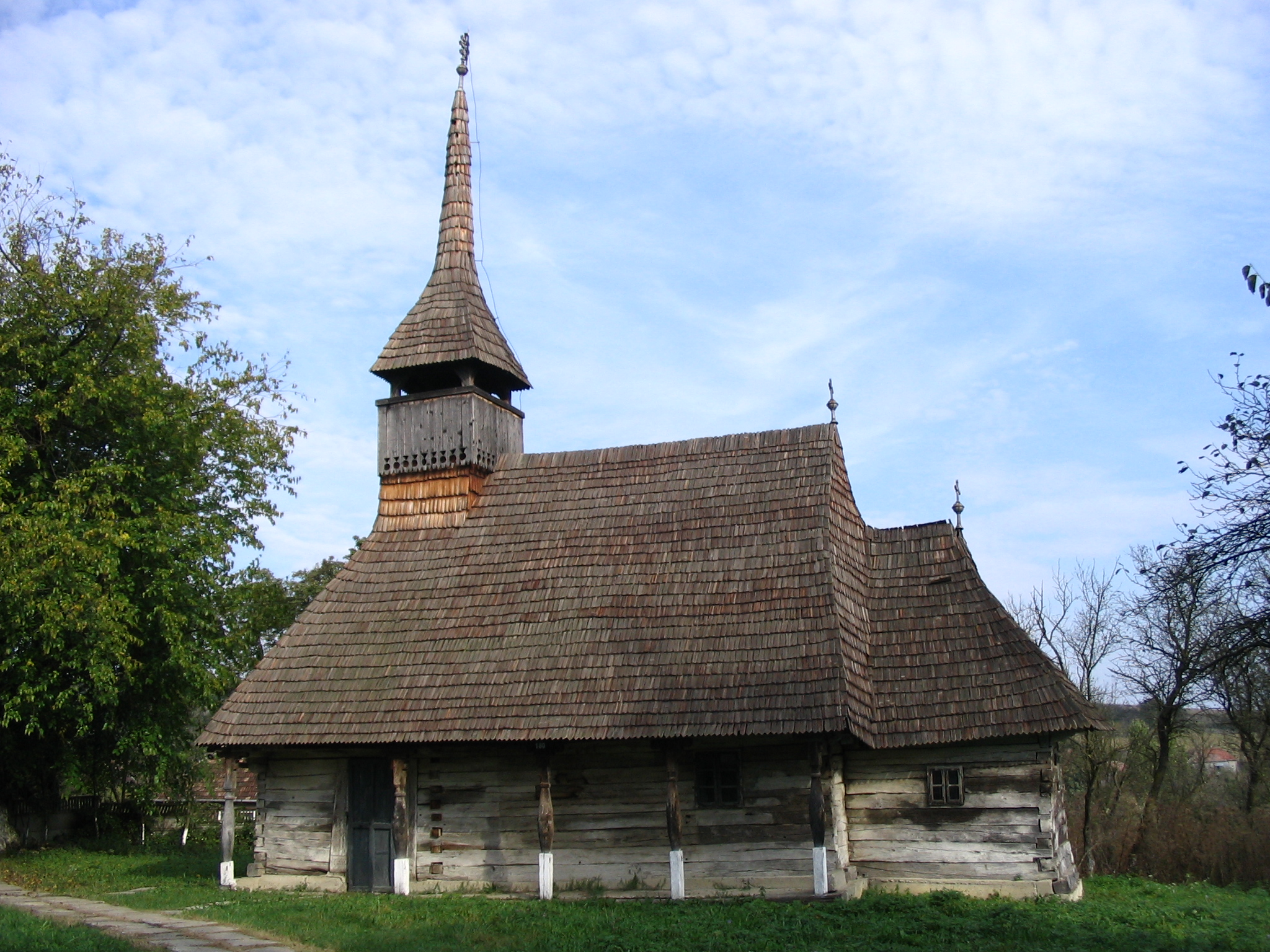
- Wooden Church in Sighetu Silvaniei

- Coat of arms

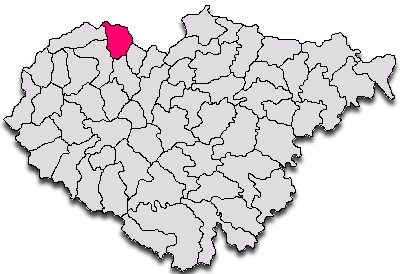
- Location in Sălaj County

- Location in Romania
- Coordinates: 47°22′59″N 22°53′18″E
- Country: Romania
- County: Sălaj

Government
  - Mayor (2020–2024): Leontin Chiș (PSD)
- Area: 43.42 km^{2} (16.76 sq mi)
- Elevation: 175 m (574 ft)
- Population (2021-12-01): 2,271
  - Density: 52.30/km^{2} (135.5/sq mi)
- Time zone: UTC+02:00 (EET)
  - Summer (DST): UTC+03:00 (EEST)
- Postal code: 457070
- Area code: +(40) 0260
- Vehicle reg.: SJ
- Website: www.comunachiesd.ro

Chieșd (Hungarian: Szilágykövesd) is a commune located in Sălaj County, Crișana, Romania. It is composed of three villages: Chieșd, Colonia Sighetu Silvaniei (Szilágyszigettelep), and Sighetu Silvaniei (Szilágysziget).

== Sights ==
- Wooden Church in Sighetu Silvaniei, built in the 17th century (1632), historic monument
- Wooden Church in Chieșd, built in the 18th century, historic monument
