= Wooden Church, Zalnoc =

Heritage site in Sălaj County, Romania

The Zalnoc wooden church
- Biserica de lemn din Zalnoc
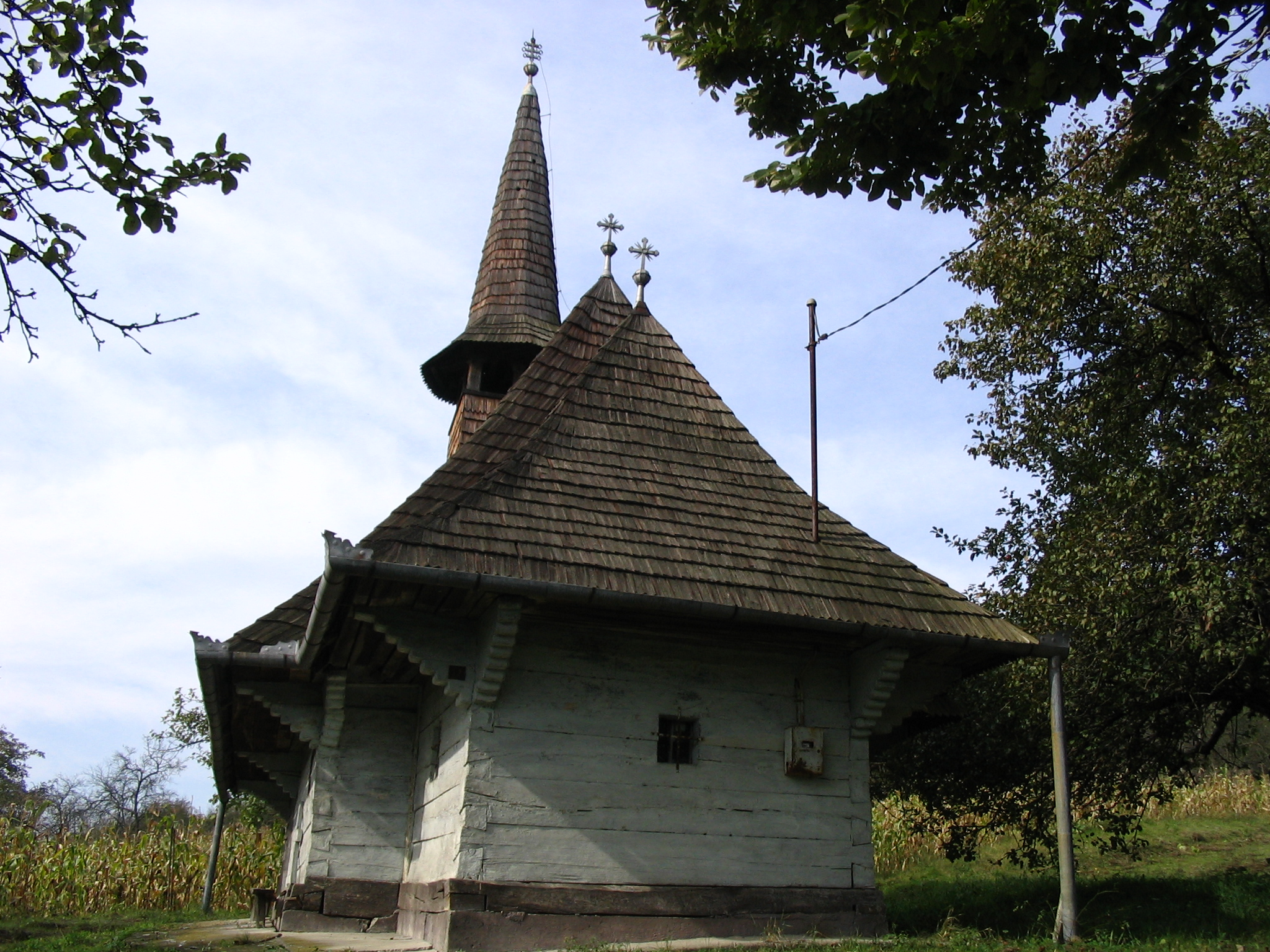

- Romania

Religion
- Affiliation: Greek Catholic
- Region: Sălaj County
- Ecclesiastical or organizational status: parish church
- Year consecrated: 18th century

Location
- Location: Zalnoc, Bobota, Sălaj
- Municipality: Zalnoc
- State: Romania
- Interactive map of The Zalnoc wooden church
- Coordinates: 47.36015°N 22.68055°E

The Zalnoc wooden church (Romanian: Biserica de lemn din Zalnoc) is a church in Zalnoc, Bobota, Sălaj, Romania, built in the 18th century.

In summer 2020, a colony of 250 greater horseshoe bats was discovered in the church, while rehabilitation work was being done.

== See also ==
- Wooden Church, Derșida
