= Wooden Church, Derșida =

Church in Sălaj County, Romania

The Derșida wooden church
- Biserica de lemn din Derșida
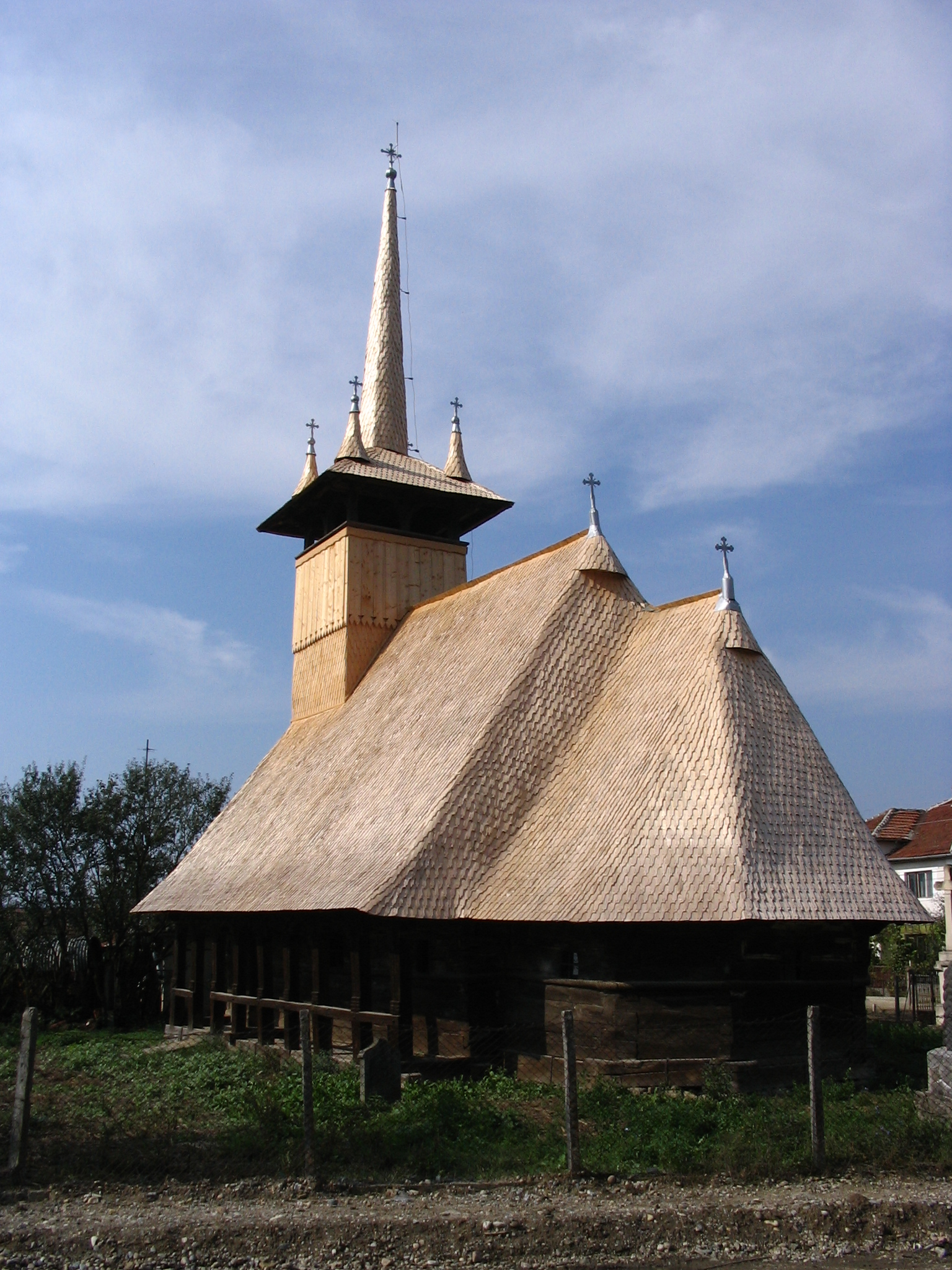

- Romania

Religion
- Affiliation: Romanian Greek-Catholic Church
- Region: Sălaj County
- Rite: Greek-Catholic
- Ecclesiastical or organizational status: parish church
- Year consecrated: 1771

Location
- Location: Derșida, Bobota, Sălaj
- Municipality: Derșida
- State: Romania
- Interactive map of The Derșida wooden church
- Coordinates: 47.38764°N 22.80330°E

The Derșida wooden church (Romanian: Biserica de lemn din Derșida) is a church in Derșida, Bobota, Sălaj, Romania, built in 1771.

== See also ==
- Wooden Church, Zalnoc
