= Greek-Catholic Church in Bocșa =

Church building in Bocșa, Romania

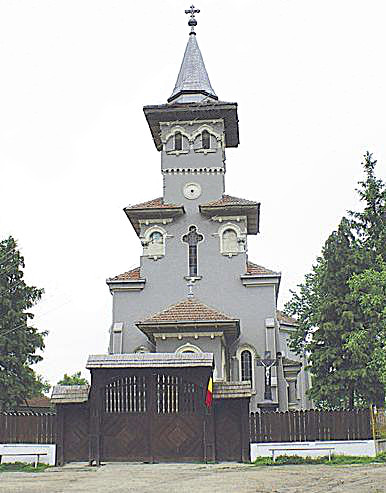

Religion
- Affiliation: Romanian Greek-Catholic Church

Location
- Municipality: Bocșa, Sălaj
- Interactive map of Greek-Catholic Church in Bocșa
- Coordinates: 47.296982°N 22.923806°E

Architecture
- Groundbreaking: 1937

The Greek-Catholic Church in Bocșa is a church in Bocșa, Sălaj, Romania. The mausoleum of Simion Bărnuțiu, which is listed as a historic monument, is located inside the church. Iuliu Hossu consecrated the church on September 8, 1937.
