= Bob Church (geneticist) =

Canadian geneticist (1937–2019)

- Born: Robert Bertram Church; May 7, 1937; Calgary, Alberta, Canada
- Died: September 6, 2019 (aged 82); Calgary, Alberta, Canada
- Education: University of Edinburgh; University of Alberta; Olds College
- Spouse(s): Joyce, Gina
- Children: 2
- Scientific career
- Fields: Genetics
- Workplaces: University of Calgary
- Thesis: Genetic and biochemical studies of growth in Drosophila (1965)
- Doctoral advisor: Forbes W. Robertson
- Other academic advisors: Roy Berg

Robert Bertram Church CM AOE (May 7, 1937 – September 6, 2019) was a Canadian geneticist, rancher, and a Professor Emeritus at the University of Calgary, noted for having helped modernize agriculture in Canada by transferring molecular biology and genetics techniques to the agricultural and biotechnology industries. He was also the director of the Canadian Institute for Advanced Research and the Calgary Stampede, as well as a founding member of the University of Calgary's Faculty of Medicine and of Canada's Natural Sciences and Engineering Research Council. In 1969, he became the founding head of the Department of Biochemistry and Molecular Biology at the University of Calgary's Faculty of Medicine, which has been since renamed to Cumming School of Medicine.

Church was inducted into the Canadian Agricultural Hall of Fame in 1991 and into the Alberta Order of Excellence in 1993. He received an honorary Doctor of Laws degree from the University of Lethbridge in 1998. In 2000, he was made a Member of the Order of Canada. In 2002, he received the Queen Elizabeth II Golden Jubilee Medal and in 2012, he received the Queen Elizabeth II Diamond Jubilee Medal. He died on September 6, 2019, at Foothills Medical Centre.
