= Wooden Church, Târgu Mureș =

Orthodox church in Târgu Mureș, Romania

Coordinates: 46°33′02″N 24°34′11″E

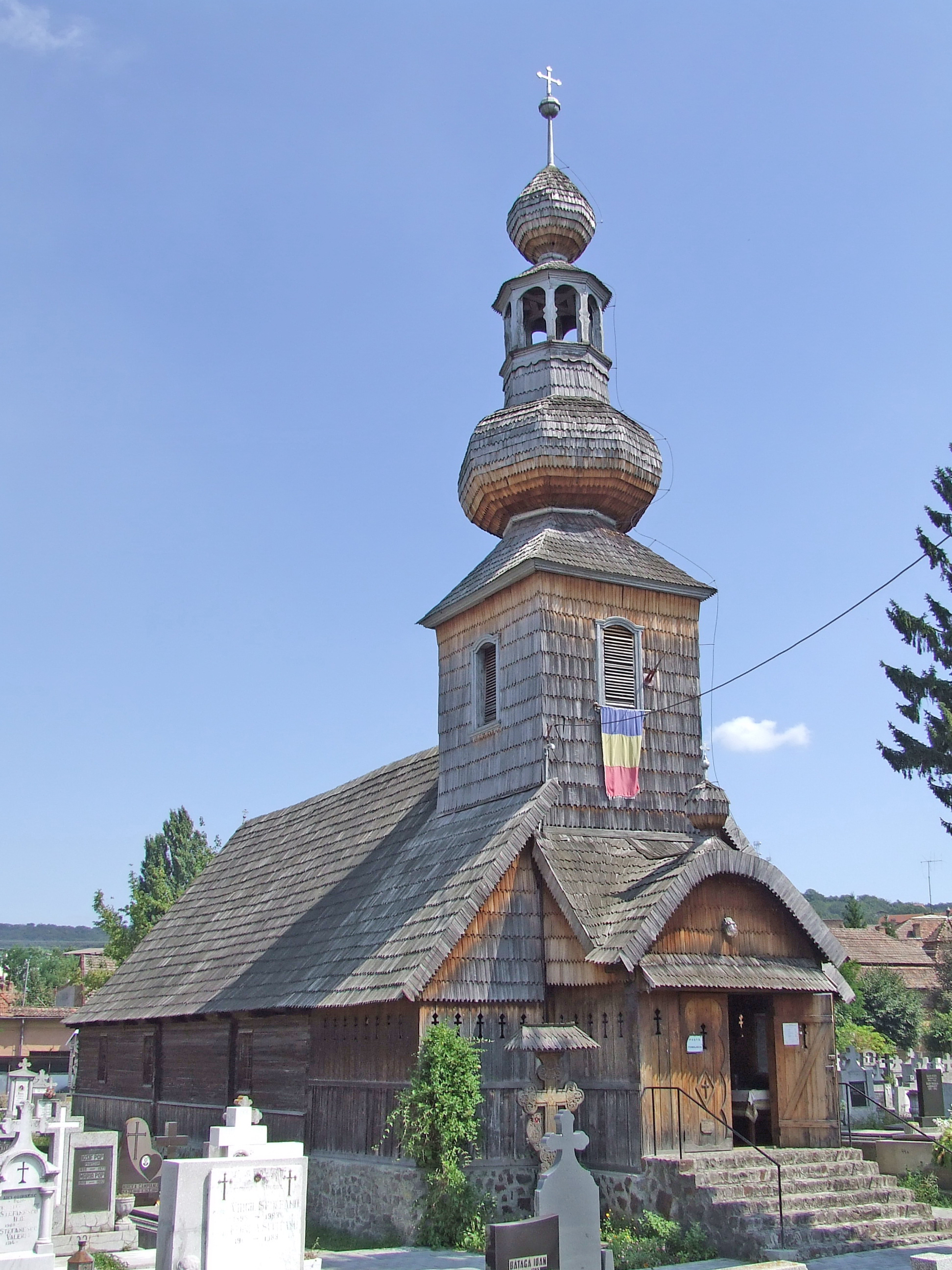
Târgu Mureș Wooden Church

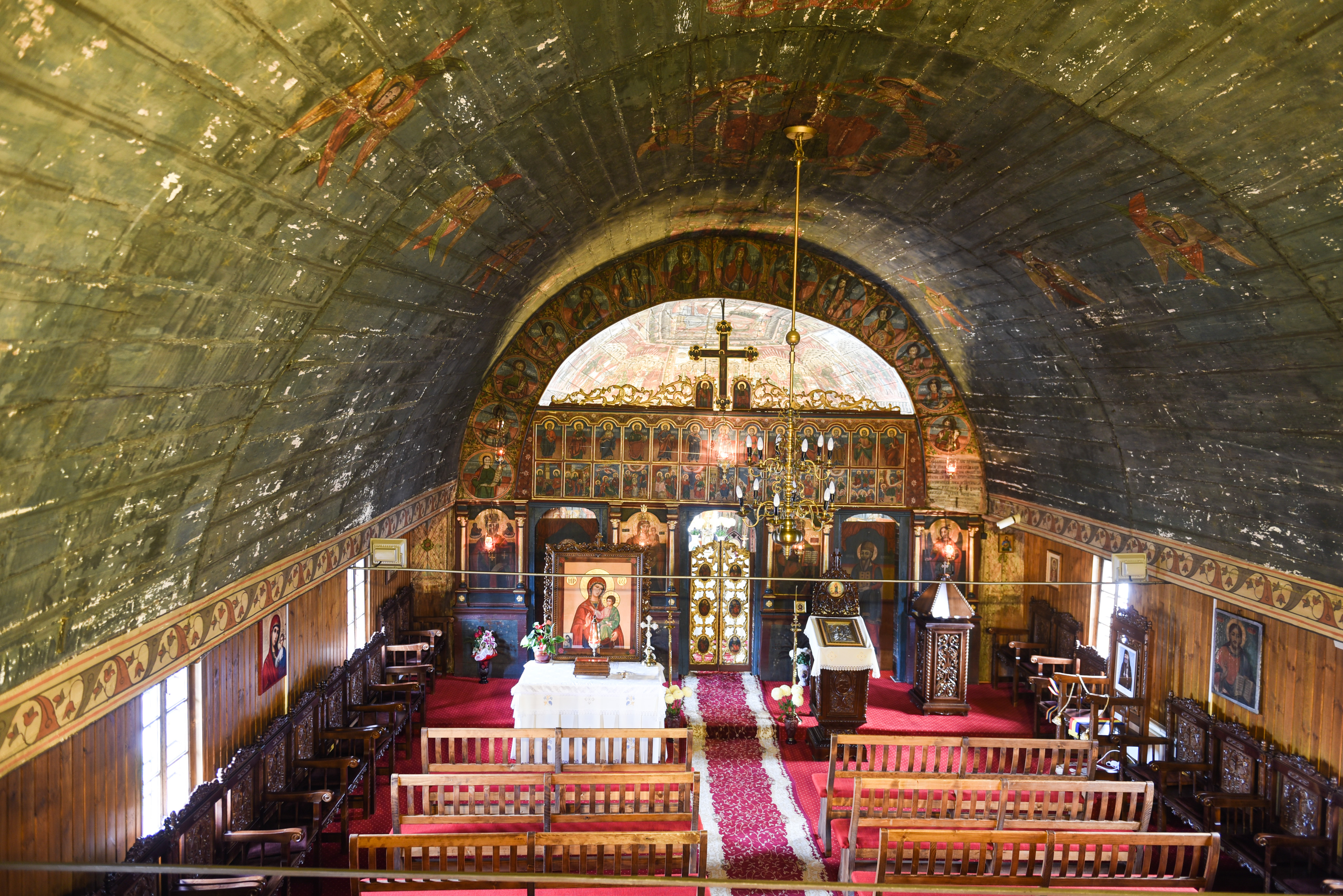
Interior

The Wooden Church is a Romanian Orthodox church located at 13 Mitropolit Andrei Șaguna Street in Târgu Mureș, Romania. It is dedicated to the Archangel Michael.

== History ==
In 1761, the authorities of the Principality of Transylvania seized the city's Orthodox church and gave it to the Romanian Greek-Catholic Church. Thereafter, Orthodox believers, obliged to journey to Cornățel in order to attend services, began to think about building a new one. At last, in April 1793, the wealthy merchant Constandin Hagi Stoian paid 550 forints for a plot of land. Construction began that month, briefly interrupted by hostile opposition. Following repeated and insistent petitions to the Royal Council in Cluj, permission was granted to continue. The Orthodox managed to complete the church the same year, in winter.

The finishing touches were only completed in 1814, the year when the interior was painted. An inscription between the nave and altar includes the names of the ktetors, Hagi Stoian and his wife Siriana, as well as a large number of parishioners; and of the painters, Nicolae Popa and Vasile Bon (or Ban). Over time, the church, built of wooden beams, suffered damage that was repaired. Rotten beams were replaced with new ones, while the old foundation, eaten away by rainwater, was consolidated with cement. The paintings were cleaned and restored in the 1970s.

The church acquired its current look in two phases. The first (1793) produced a simple rectangular building with narthex, nave and an easterly altar. The second (1810-1814) involved adding a porch on the west end and painting. The style and technique of the artwork points to three different painters. The first, rather lacking in talent, was responsible for the few scenes on the semicircular narthex and nave ceiling. The other two, Popa and Bon, worked on the iconostasis and altar, demonstrating keen knowledge of their craft and imagination.

== Iconography ==
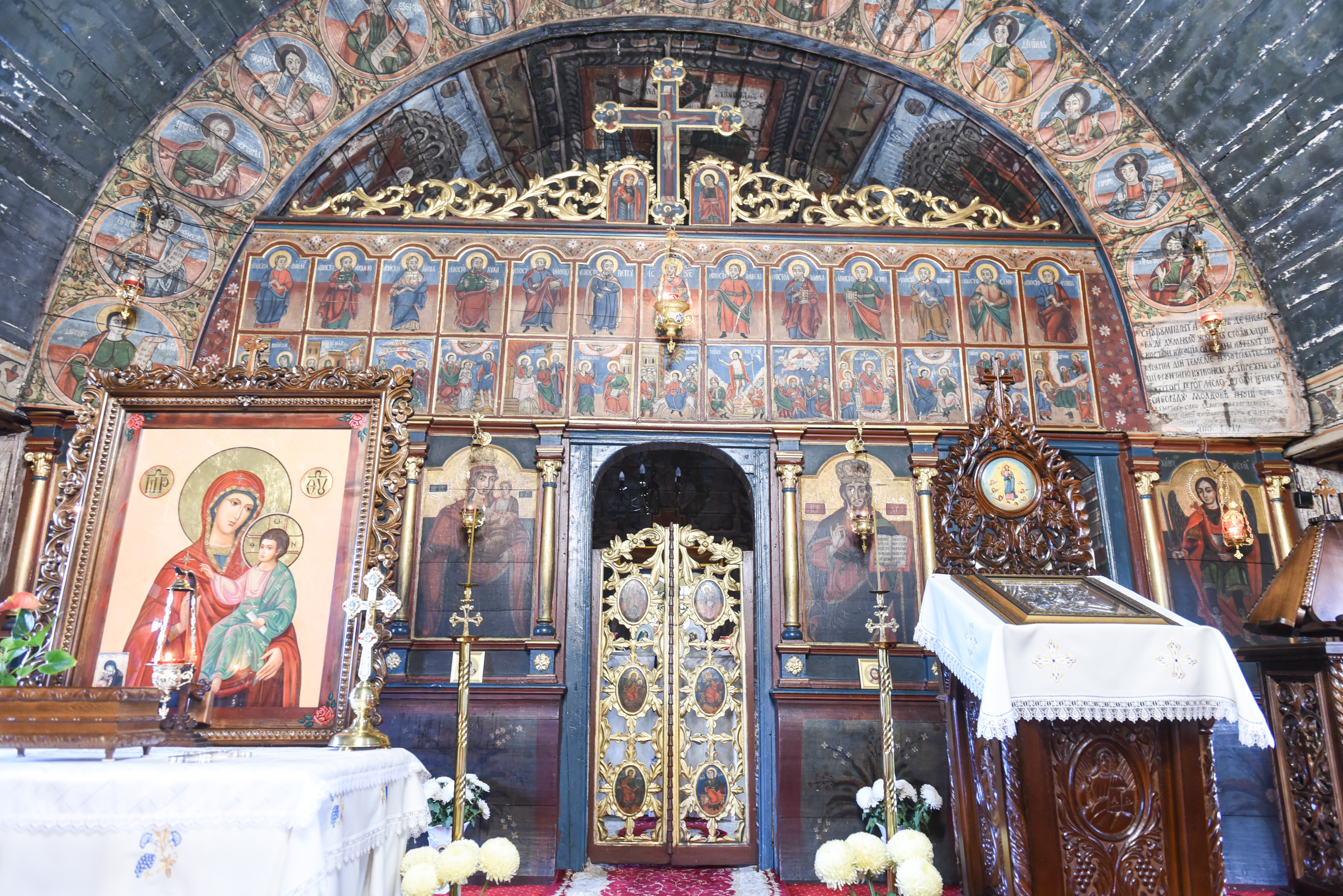
Iconostasis

The iconostasis and murals show the influence of the late Transylvanian Baroque style in the plant and geometric decor, while the human figures fall into the formal schemes of the 18th century. The two painters’ contributions are practically impossible to tell apart, pointing to a joint effort and perhaps a studio linked to the artistic center of Feisa.

In general, the iconostasis arrangement follows the canonical rules, with portraits of Jesus, the Madonna and Child, Saint Nicholas and the patron Saint Michael. Moses and Aaron appear on the deacons’ doors, while the Baroque royal doors feature six medallions. These depict the Virgin Mary, the Archangel Gabriel during the Annunciation of Mary, and the Four Evangelists. The next register passes through the Twelve Great Feasts, while the uppermost shows the Twelve Apostles with Christ in the center. A cross sits atop the iconostasis, painted with the crucified Christ; the Evangelists are at each extremity. Icons of Mary and John the Apostle flank the cross.

On the arch dividing the altar from the nave, there appear medallions of the Virgin Mary, the Four Major Prophets and nine of the Twelve Minor Prophets. The dedicatory inscription is at the end, in Romanian Cyrillic. The altar apse is painted on three registers: first, the Holy Trinity, then a variety of angels, and last a number of scenes primarily from the Gospels. Despite the limited space, the artists also managed to fit fifteen images of bishops, including Gregory the Illuminator, uniquely for a Transylvanian Orthodox wooden church.

The church is listed as a historic monument by Romania's Ministry of Culture and Religious Affairs.
