= Șimleu Silvaniei =

Town in Sălaj County, Romania

Șimleu Silvaniei Szilágysomlyó
- Town
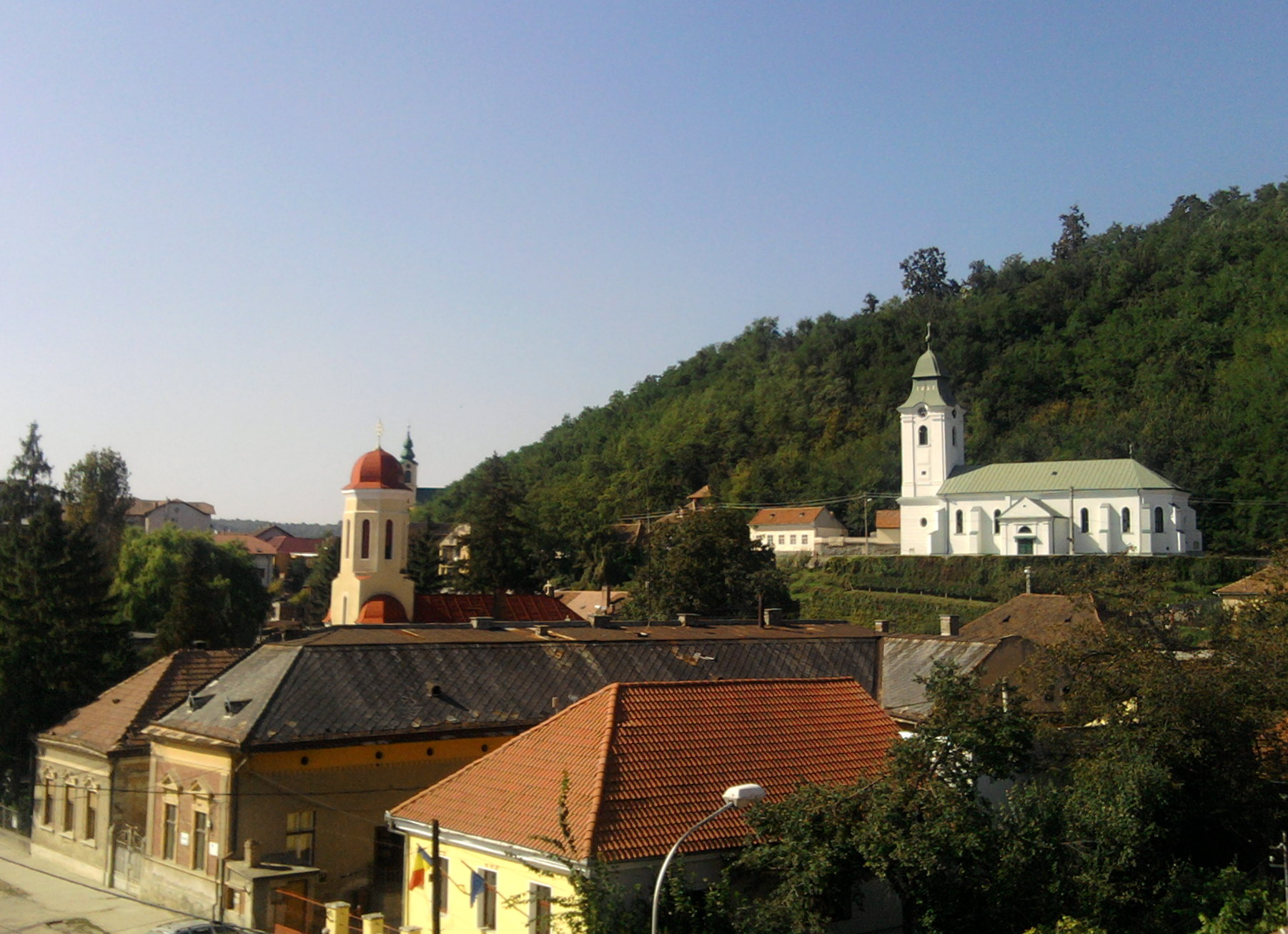
- Orthodox and Reformed churches

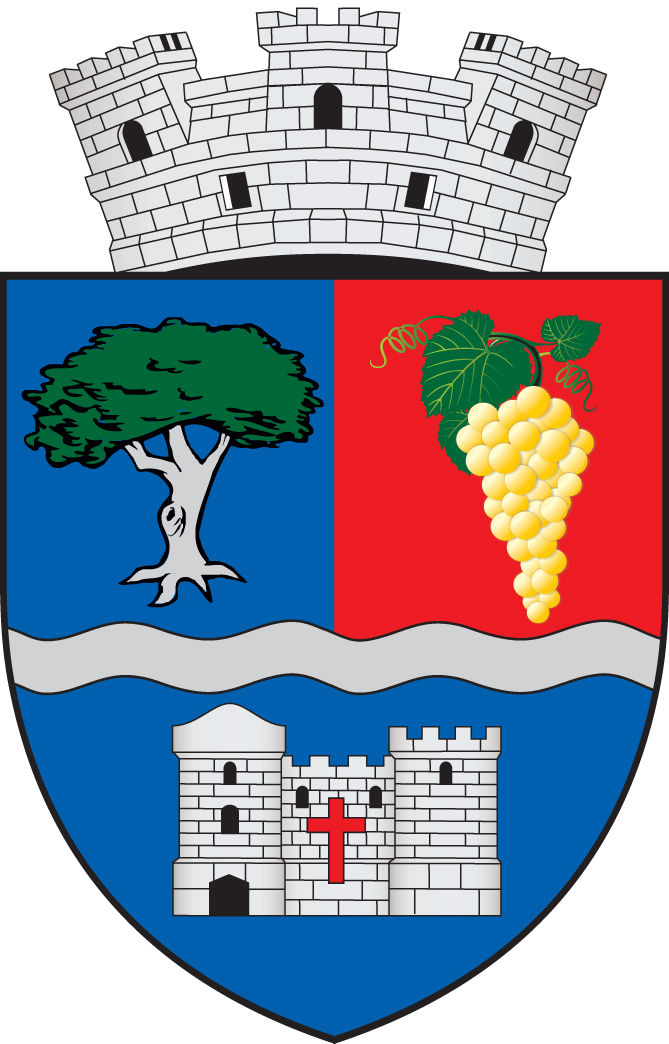
- Seal

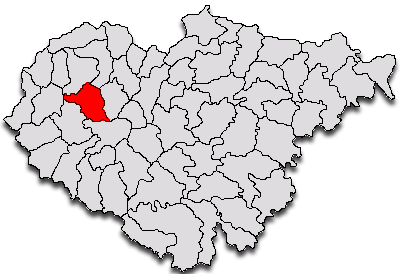
- Location in Sălaj County

- Location in Romania
- Coordinates: 47°13′50″N 22°48′00″E
- Country: Romania
- County: Sălaj

Government
  - Mayor (2024–2028): Mihai-Cristian Lazar (PNL)
- Area: 62.26 km^{2} (24.04 sq mi)
- Elevation: 234 m (768 ft)
- Population (2021-12-01): 13,948
  - Density: 224.0/km^{2} (580.2/sq mi)
- Time zone: UTC+02:00 (EET)
  - Summer (DST): UTC+03:00 (EEST)
- Postal code: 455300
- Vehicle reg.: SJ
- Website: www.simleusilvaniei.ro

Șimleu Silvaniei (Romanian pronunciation: [ʃimˌle.u silˈvani.ej]; Hungarian: Szilágysomlyó, German: Schomlenmarkt, Yiddish: שאַמלױ) is a town in Sălaj County, Crișana, Romania with a population of 13,948 people (2021 census). It is located near the ancient Dacian fortress Dacidava.

Three villages are administered by the town: Bic (Bükk), Cehei (Somlyócsehi), and Pusta (Csehipuszta).

== History ==
=== Ancient times ===
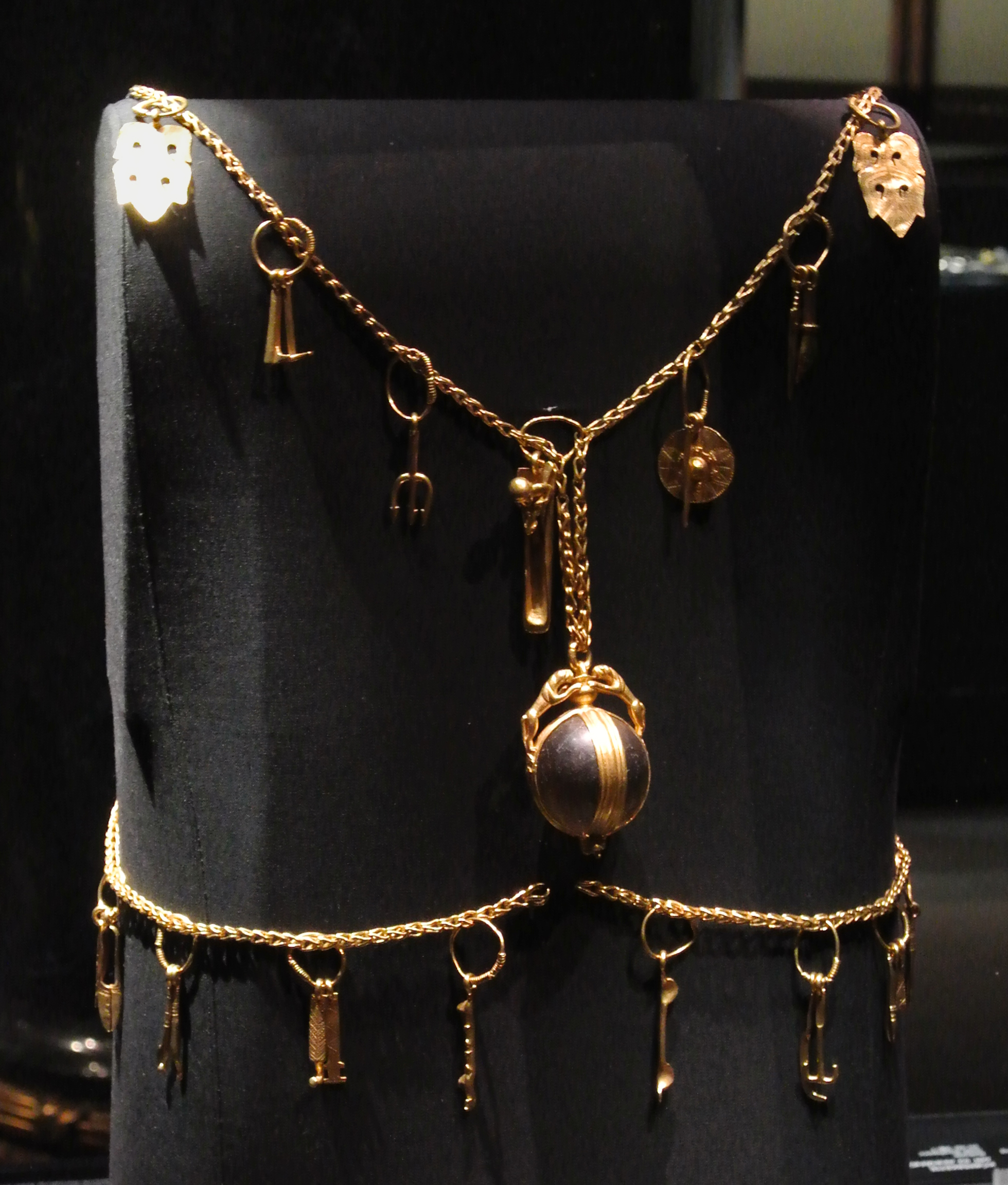
Gepid gold necklace with 52 pendants discovered at Șimleu, now exhibited at Kunsthistorisches Museum, Vienna

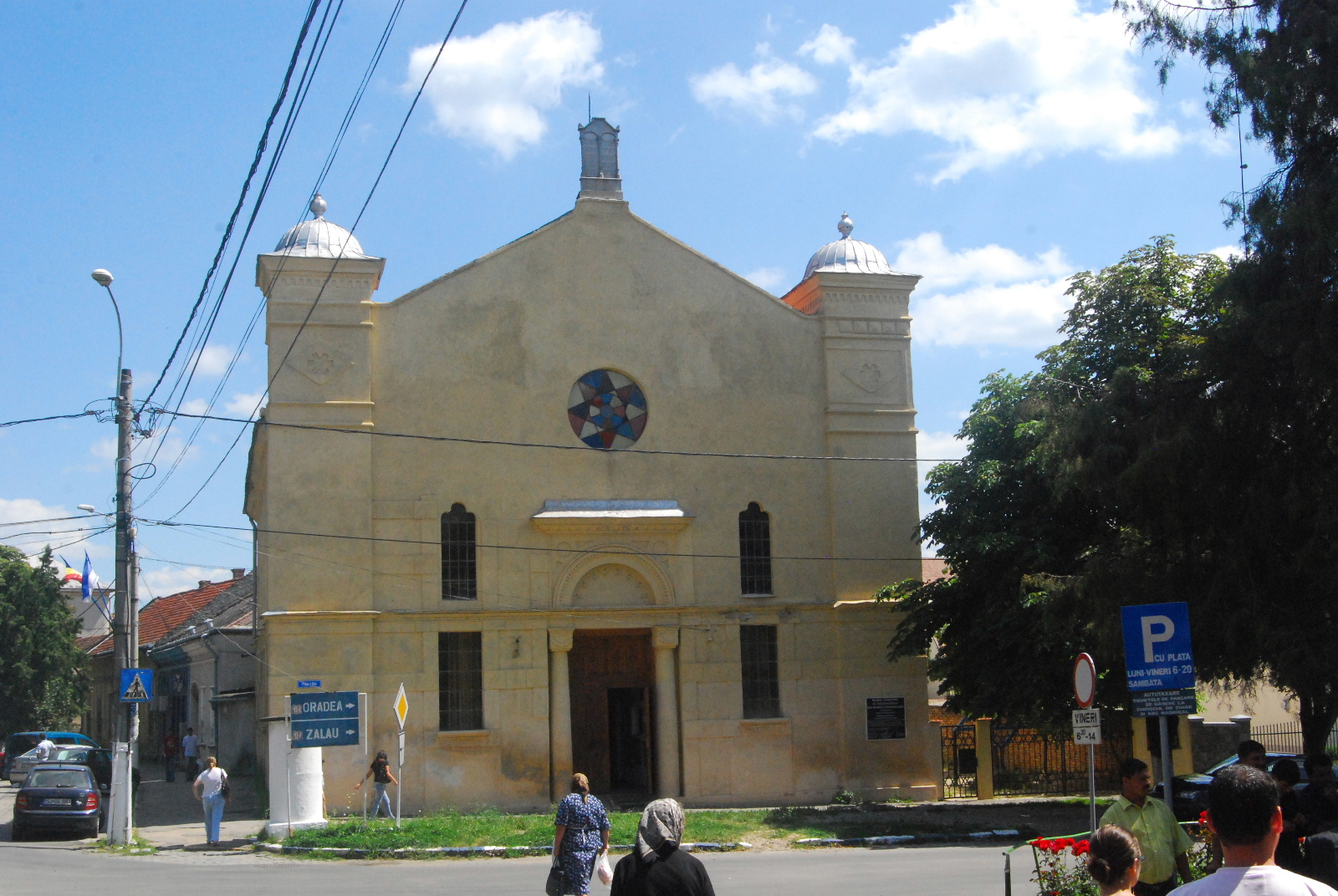
Northern Transylvania Holocaust Memorial Museum

Before the Roman conquest of Dacia, Șimleu was a political, social and administrative Dacian centre, of high importance. Seven Dacian fortresses, some with associated settlements, were arranged in an arc shape around the hills of Șimleu. They had a strategic role in supervising the trade along the salt road coming from areas around Napoca, Potaissa, and modern Dej, and heading to Pannonia.

The centre of an early Gepidia, on the plains northwest of the Meseș Mountains, appears to have been located around Șimleu Silvaniei, where early 5th-century precious objects of Roman provenance have been unearthed.

=== Middle Ages ===
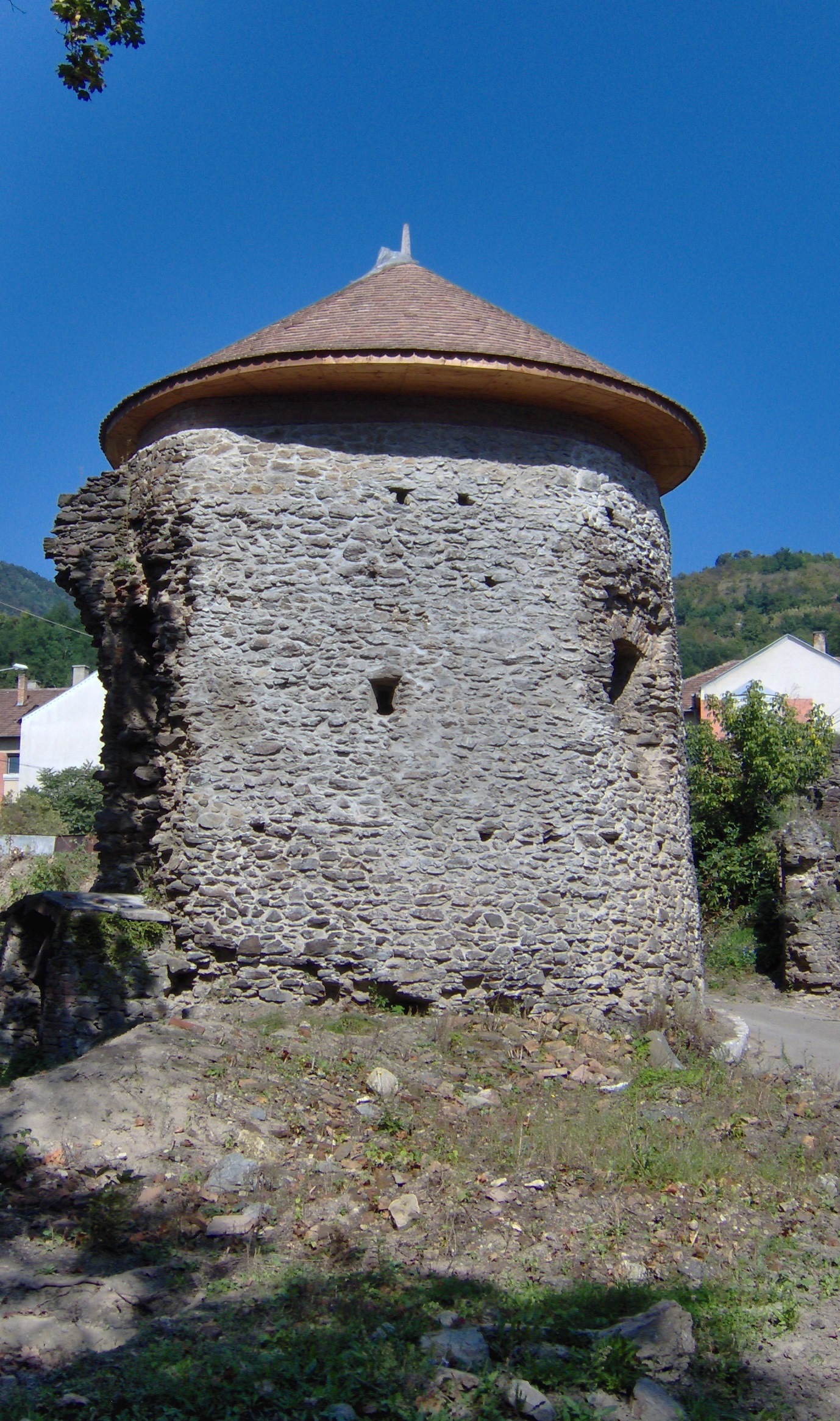
Șimleu Silvaniei Fort built by the Báthory family

The town was mentioned in 1258 as Wathasomlyowa. The name means "Wata's mountain"; the name Wata is of Old Turkish origin, while somlyowa is an archaic Hungarian word for mountain(side).

The town belonged to the Báthory family, whose ancestral castle stood here. The castle was built by Miklós, voivode of Transylvania in the early 13th century and was first mentioned in 1319. After the Báthory family built a mansion in the town in 1592, the castle became deserted and today lies in ruins.

The Catholic church was built in 1534 by Transylvania's voivode Báthory István and his wife Telegdy Katalin with the occasion of their son's birth. Holy Trinity Statue was built in 1772. The Reformed church was rebuilt between 1729 and 1736. The synagogue was built in 1876.

The mansion was occupied by Giorgio Basta from Zsigmond Báthory in 1600. It was occupied by the Ottomans in 1660 and was part of Varat Eyalet until 1692. In 1703 it was occupied by Kurucs.

From 1876 to 1920, Șimleu Silvaniei was part of the Szilágy County of the Kingdom of Hungary.

The Greek Catholic Vicariate of Șimleu Silvaniei was formed in 1910 and in 1817 the vicariate opened its own school. George Tatu (1810-1824), Georgiu Abraham (1824-1828), Isidor Alpini (1828-1835), Alexandru Sterca-Șuluțiu (1836-1850), Demetriu Coroianu (1850-1873), Alimpiu Barboloviciu (1873-1914), Alexandru Ghetie (1914-1922), Emil Bran (1926-1932), Petru Cupcea (1932-1940), Cornel Darabant (1940-1945), Gheorghe Țurcaș (2004-2009) served as vicars of Șimleu Silvaniei. The old Greek Catholic church was destroyed by a storm in 1866. Notre Dame Church was built between 1871 and 1873.

In 1919, the Simion Bărnuțiu National College, the first Romanian language high school in Sălaj County was founded here, and today the town is home to three high schools.

In 1940, Șimleu Silvaniei, along with the rest of Northern Transylvania, was given to Hungary through the Second Vienna Award imposed by Nazi Germany and Fascist Italy; Romania regained the area in 1944.

Since 1997, inside Bic Monastery, there is the wooden church from Stâna; built in 1778 it has a rectangular plan with nave and pronave.

== Holocaust ==
The Cehei ghetto operated within the town's administrative area. The ghetto was one of the Nazi-era ghettos for European Jews during World War II. It was active in the spring of 1944, following Operation Margarethe. The deportations from Cehei took place in three transports: May 31 (3,106), June 3 (3,161) and June 6 (1,584), with a total of 7,851 Jews sent to Auschwitz. Some 1,200 Sălaj Jews survived the Holocaust but later emigrated from Romania, so that by the 2000s, under fifty Jews remained in the county.

== Population ==
Historical population
Year	Pop.	±%
1850	4,027	—
1880	4,890	+21.4%
1900	6,553	+34.0%
1910	7,886	+20.3%
1920	7,954	+0.9%
1930	8,682	+9.2%
1941	10,353	+19.2%
1948	7,931	−23.4%
1956	10,009	+26.2%
1966	12,324	+23.1%
1977	14,575	+18.3%
1992	17,642	+21.0%
2002	17,053	−3.3%
2011	13,200	−22.6%
2021	13,948	+5.7%
Source: Census data

At the 2021 census, Șimleu Silvaniei had a population of 13,948. According to the census from 2011, there were 14,436 people living within the town; of those, 66.77% were ethnic Romanians, while 22.87% were ethnic Hungarians, 9.82% ethnic Romani, and 0.51% others. At the 1910 census, out of 6,885 inhabitants, 6,030 were Hungarians (87.58%) and 759 were Romanians (11.02%).

== Politics ==
=== 2012 election ===
The Șimleu Silvaniei Council, elected in the 2012 local government election, is made up of 17 councilors, with the following party composition: 7-Democratic Party, 4-Social Democratic Party, 3-Democratic Alliance of Hungarians in Romania, 2-National Liberal Party, and 1-People's Party – Dan Diaconescu.

Party	Seats	2012 Şimleu Silvaniei Council
Democratic Party	7	
Social Democratic Party	4	
Democratic Alliance of Hungarians in Romania	3	
National Liberal Party	2	
People's Party – Dan Diaconescu	1	

=== 2008 election ===
The mayor Septimiu Țurcaș was elected in the second round of 2008 local government election.

=== 2004 election ===
The mayor Septimiu Țurcaș was elected for the first time in 2004 local government election as a member of the Democratic Liberal Party and re-elected in 2008 and 2012.

Party	Seats	2004 Şimleu Silvaniei Council
Democratic Alliance of Hungarians in Romania	5	
National Liberal Party	5	
Democratic Party	4	
Social Democratic Party	3	

=== Mayors ===
- József Udvari
- Octavian Guțu (b. February 23, 1946) was elected in 2000.
- Septimiu Țurcaș (b. September 6, 1968) was elected in 2004, 2008, 2012, 2016 and 2020.
- Mihai-Cristian Lazar was elected in 2021.

== Flora and fauna ==
Cehei Pond Nature Reserve is a protected area with aquatic vegetation and fauna within the town's administrative area.

== Sights to see ==
- Cehei Pond (18.20 ha)
- Castle ruins
- Báthory mansion (16th century)
- Roman Catholic church (1532)
- Northern Transylvania Holocaust Memorial Museum
- Wooden Church, Cehei

== Notable people ==
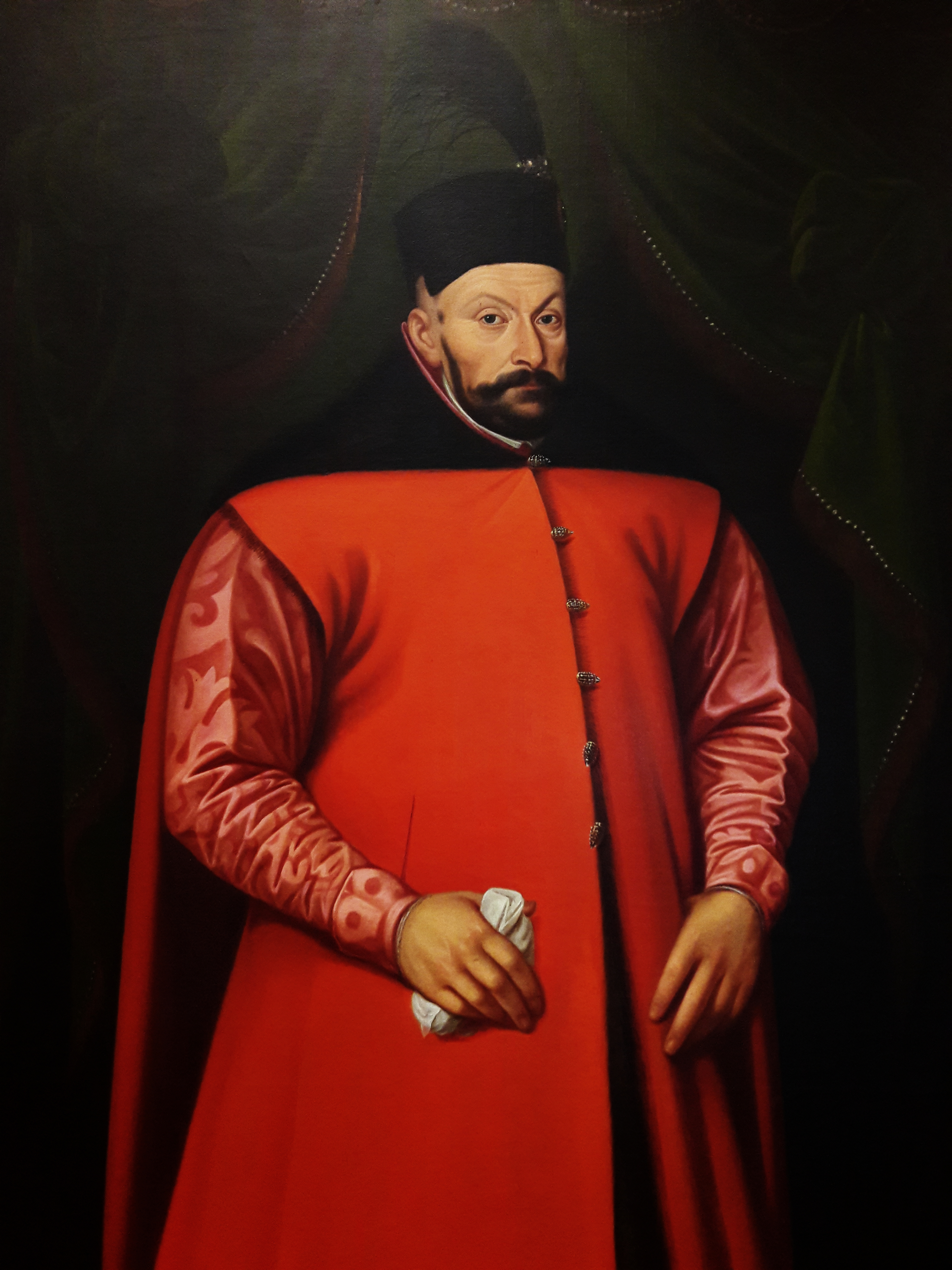
Painting of Stephen Báthory

- Andrew Báthory (ca.1562–1599) a Cardinal-deacon and Prince of Transylvania in 1599.
- Christopher Báthory (1530–1581) voivode of Transylvania from 1576 to 1581.
- Sophia Báthory, (died 1680), notable member of the Somlyó branch of the Báthory family.
- Stephen Báthory (1533–1586) Prince of Transylvania, King of Poland and Grand Duke of Lithuania (1576–1586).
- György Bölöni (1882–1959), Hungarian writer and journalist.
- Zoltan Farmati (1924–2006) a Romanian footballer with 219 club caps and 21 for Romania.
- Elly Gross (born 1929) a Holocaust survivor and public speaker in the United States.
- Gisella Grosz (1875–1942) a Hungarian classical pianist.
- Miklós Nyiszli (1901–1956) a Hungarian prisoner of Jewish heritage at Auschwitz.
- Joe Pasternak (1901–1991) a Hungarian-American film producer in Hollywood.
- Liviu Antal (born 1989) a Romanian footballer with 500 club caps.

== International relations ==
=== Twin towns — sister cities ===
Șimleu Silvaniei is twinned with:

- Nyírbátor, Hungary
- Szarvas, Hungary

== Climate ==
Șimleu Silvaniei has a humid continental climate (Cfb in the Köppen climate classification).

Climate data for Șimleu Silvaniei
Month	Jan	Feb	Mar	Apr	May	Jun	Jul	Aug	Sep	Oct	Nov	Dec	Year
Mean daily maximum °C (°F)	2.1 (35.8)	4.4 (39.9)	9.6 (49.3)	16 (61)	20.5 (68.9)	23.7 (74.7)	25.6 (78.1)	25.8 (78.4)	20.7 (69.3)	15.2 (59.4)	9.6 (49.3)	3.4 (38.1)	14.7 (58.5)
Daily mean °C (°F)	−1.4 (29.5)	0.3 (32.5)	4.9 (40.8)	10.9 (51.6)	15.6 (60.1)	19.2 (66.6)	21 (70)	21 (70)	16 (61)	10.5 (50.9)	5.4 (41.7)	0.1 (32.2)	10.3 (50.6)
Mean daily minimum °C (°F)	−4.8 (23.4)	−3.8 (25.2)	0.1 (32.2)	5.1 (41.2)	9.9 (49.8)	13.6 (56.5)	15.6 (60.1)	15.5 (59.9)	11.1 (52.0)	6.1 (43.0)	1.8 (35.2)	−2.9 (26.8)	5.6 (42.1)
Average precipitation mm (inches)	48 (1.9)	49 (1.9)	59 (2.3)	70 (2.8)	85 (3.3)	100 (3.9)	98 (3.9)	74 (2.9)	75 (3.0)	62 (2.4)	56 (2.2)	59 (2.3)	835 (32.8)
Source: https://en.climate-data.org/europe/romania/salaj/simleu-silvaniei-15433/

== Gallery ==
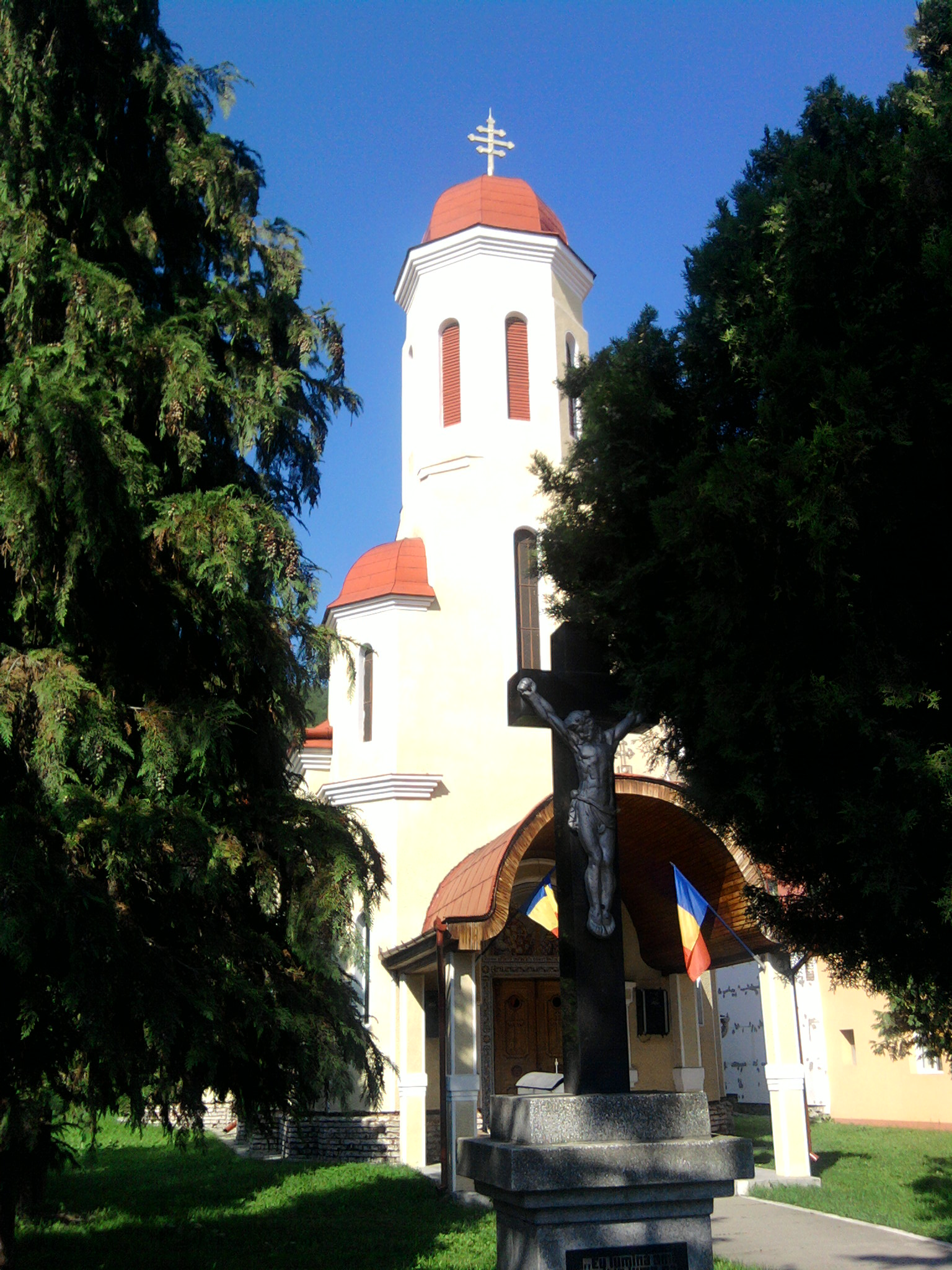
Greek Catholic Church

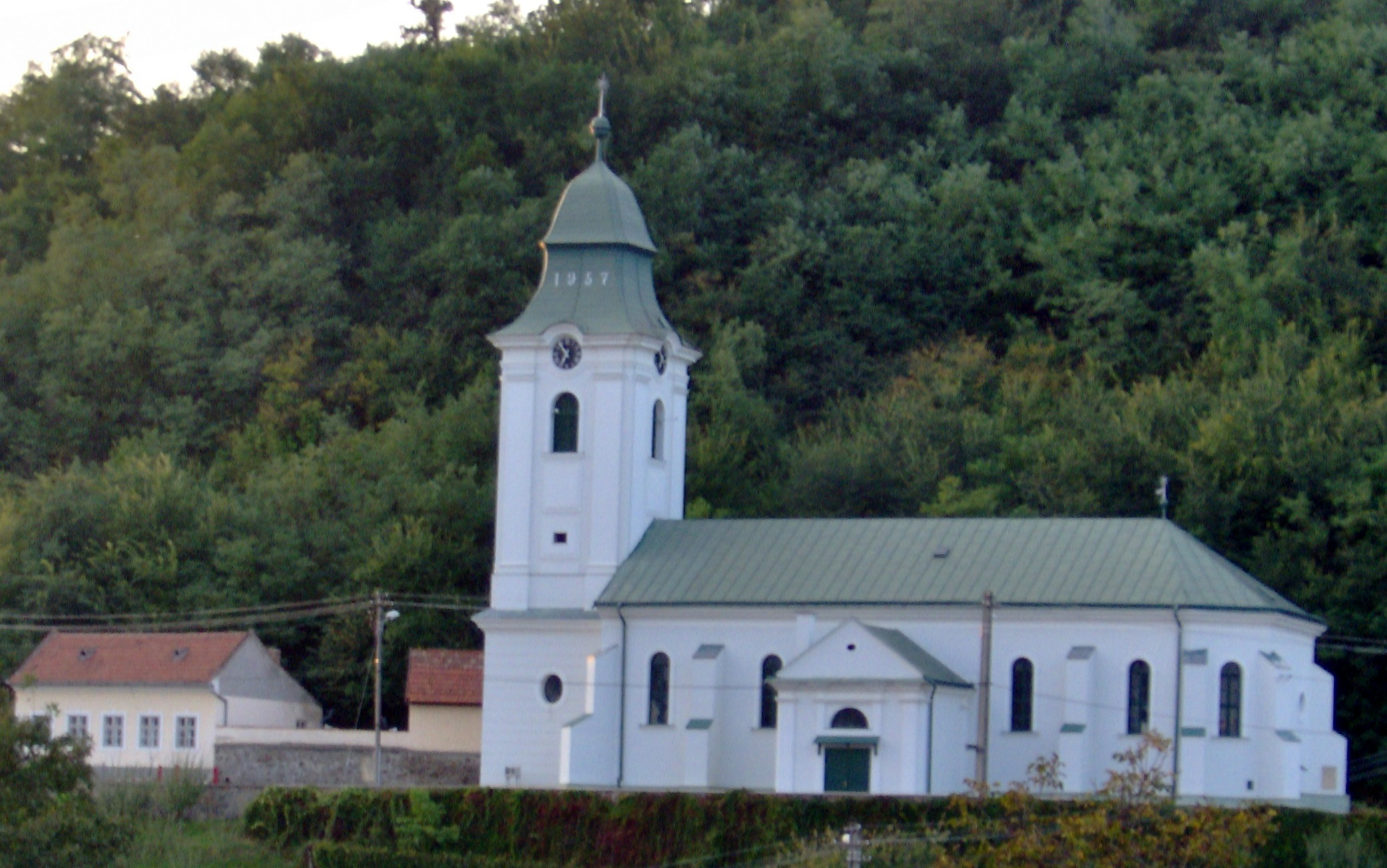
Reformed Church

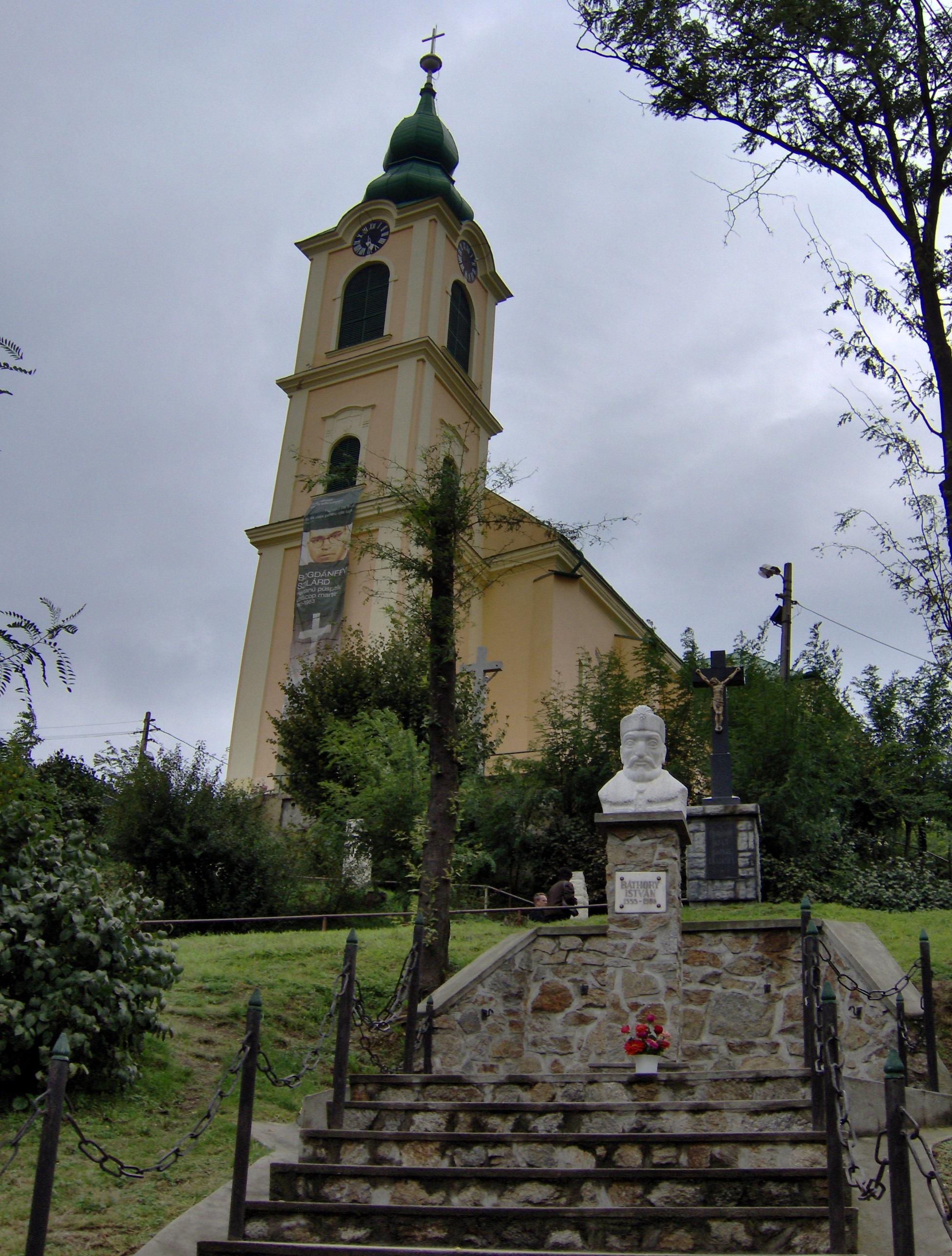
Roman Catholic Church

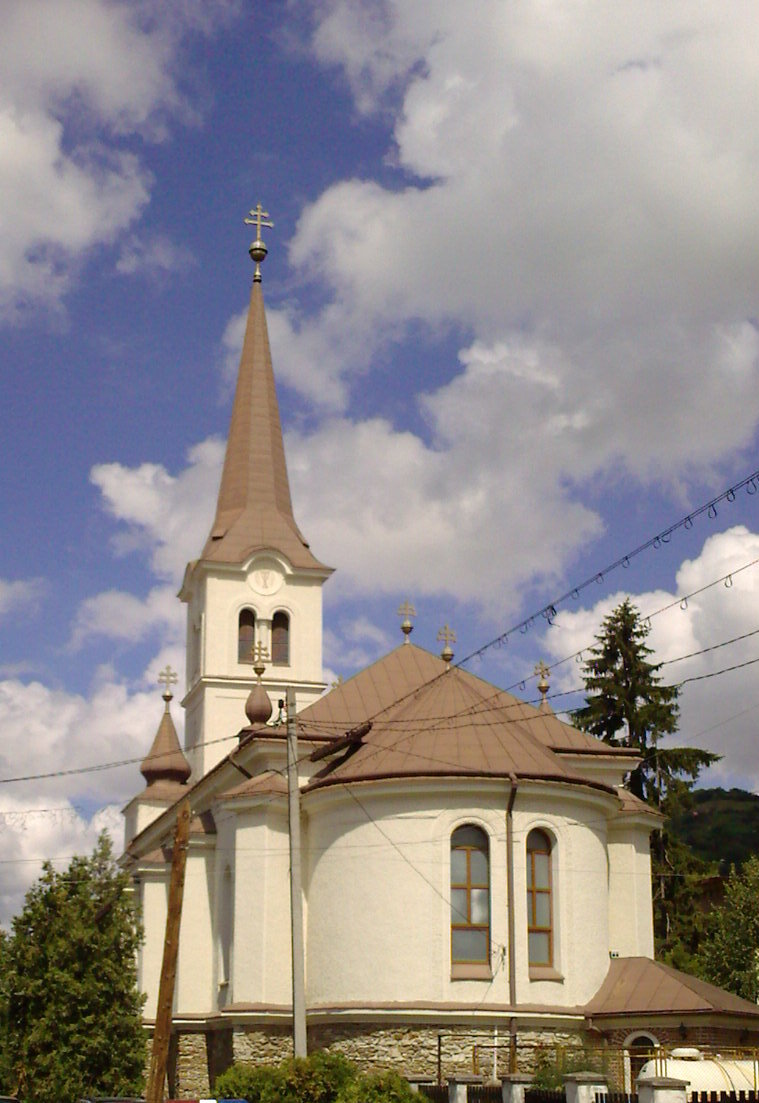
Orthodox Church

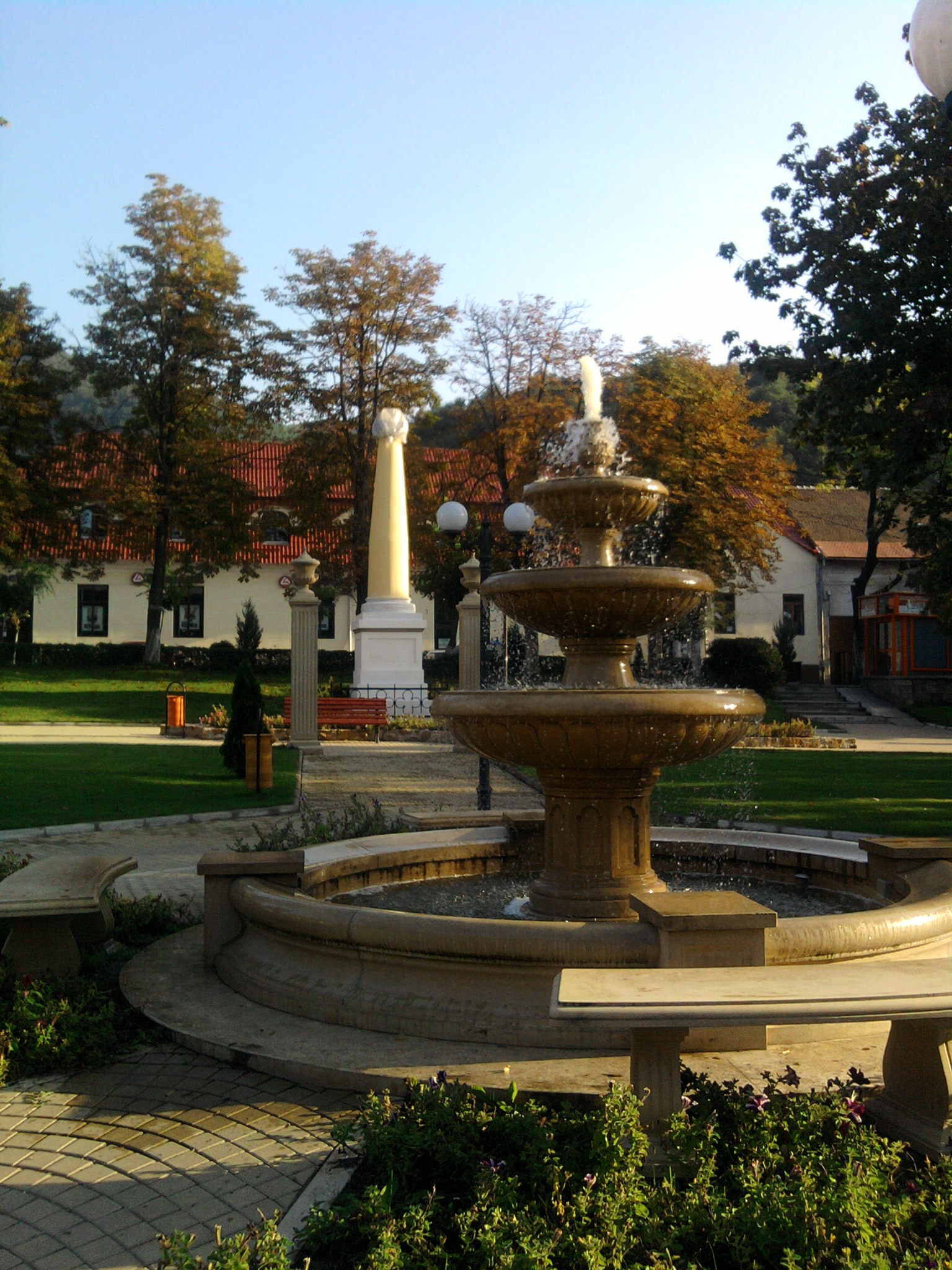
Central park

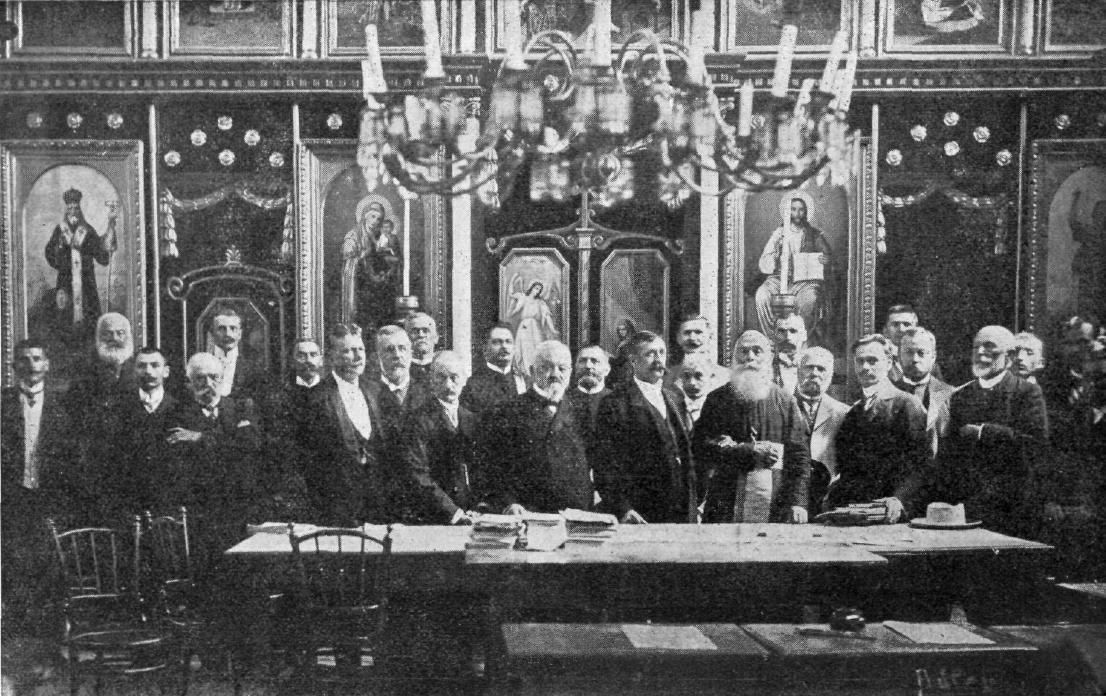
ASTRA group picture at Notre Dame Church, Șimleu Silvaniei, August 1908
