= 1736 in architecture =

Events concerning Architecture from the year 1736.

== Buildings and structures ==
=== Buildings ===
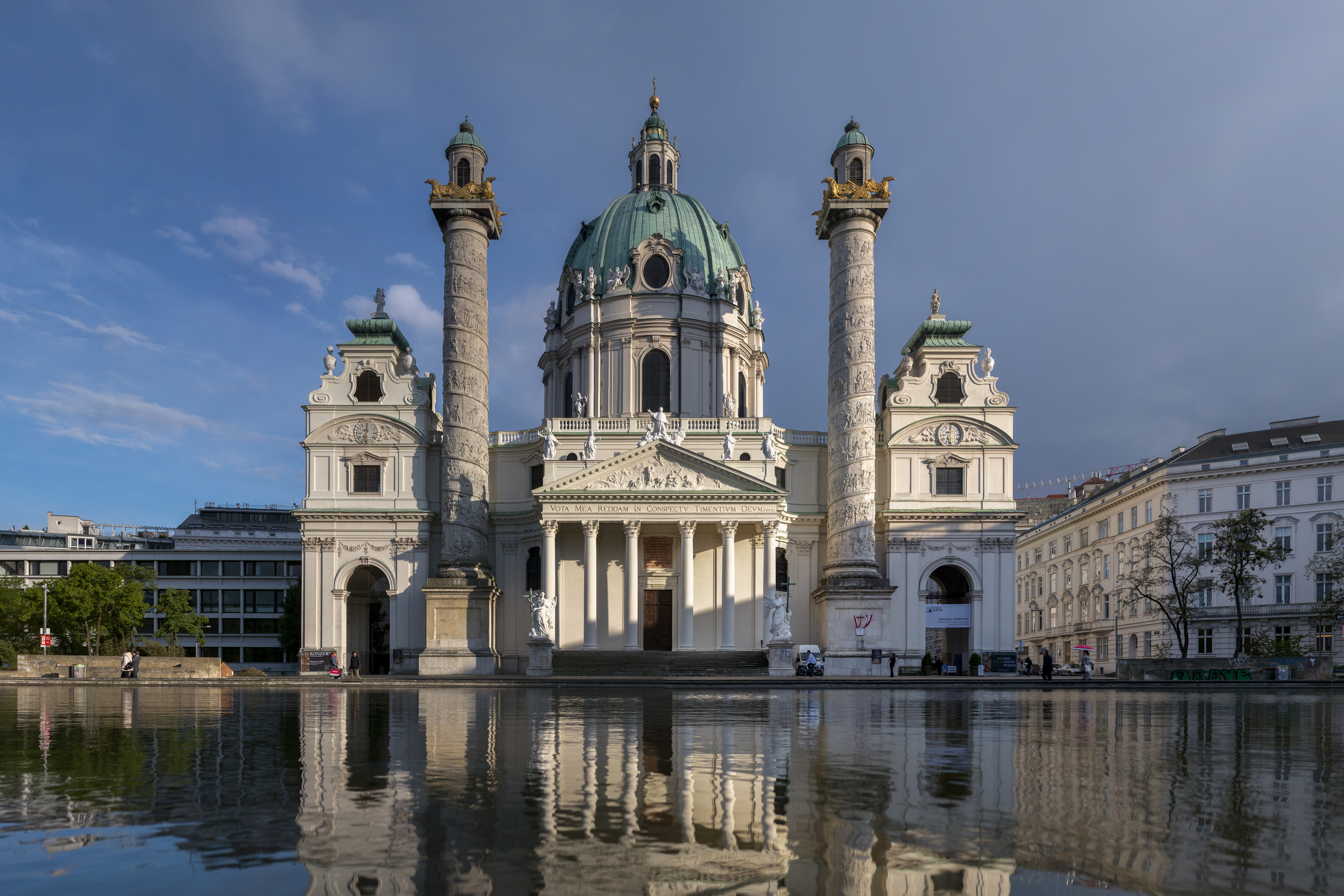
Karlskirche, Vienna

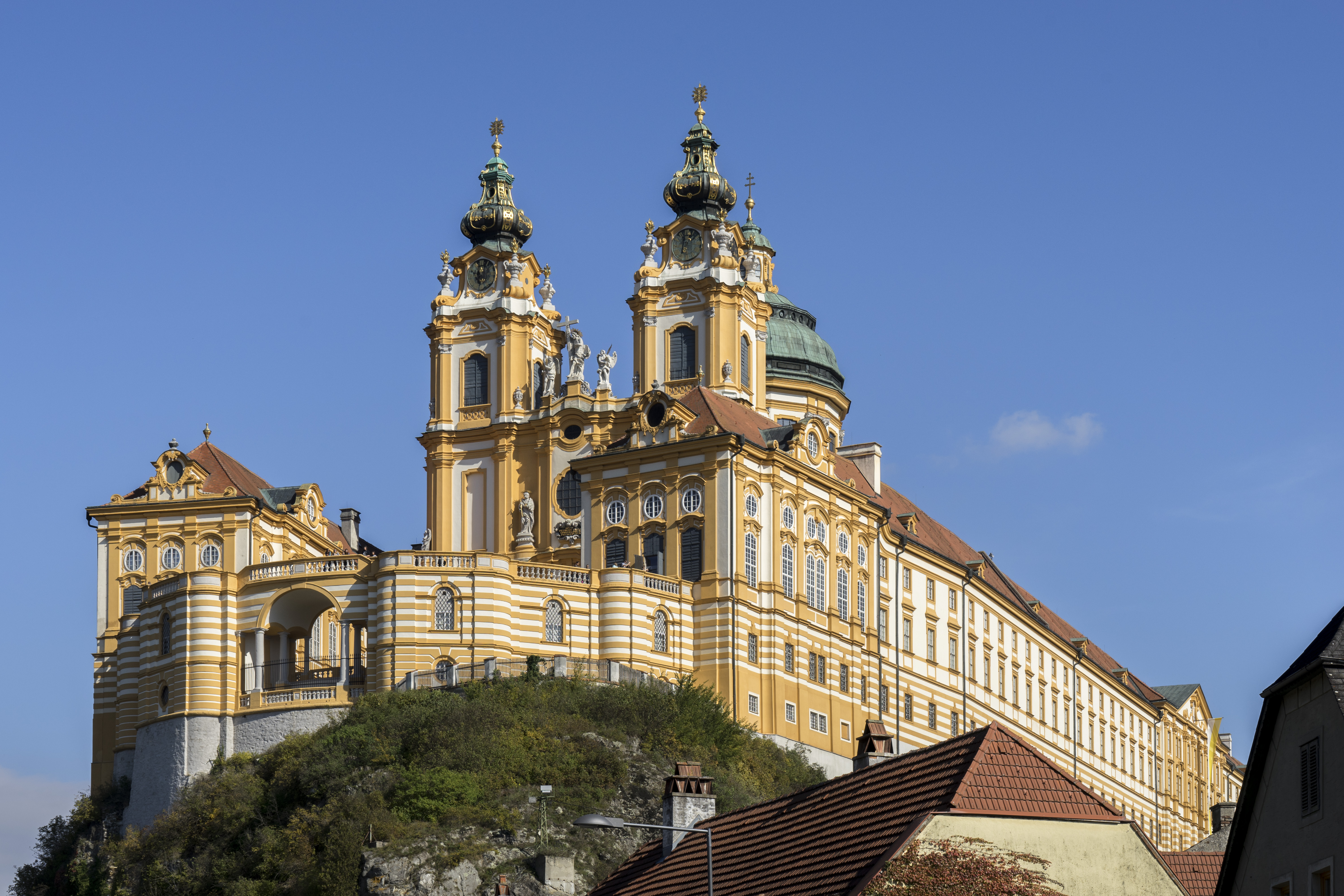
Melk Abbey in Austria

- Karlskirche in Vienna (begun 1716), designed by Johann Bernhard Fischer von Erlach, is completed by his son, Joseph Emanuel Fischer von Erlach.
- Melk Abbey in Austria (begun 1702), designed by Jakob Prandtauer, is completed.
- Town church of Piaseczno in Poland, designed by Carl Frederick Pöppelmann, is built.
- Rebuilt church of St George the Martyr Southwark in London, designed by John Price, is completed.
- Rebuilt St Swithun's Church, Worcester, England, designed by Thomas and Edward Woodward, is completed.
- Rebuilt Reformed Church, Șimleu Silvaniei in Romania is completed and consecrated.
- Reconstruction of church of San Marcuola on the Grand Canal in Venice, designed by Antonio Gaspari, is completed by Giorgio Massari.
- Church and Convent of Capuchins in Antigua Guatemala is consecrated.
- Khan Sulayman Pasha in Damascus is completed.
- Đình Bảng communal house in Vietnam is completed.
- Roskilde Royal Mansion (Denmark), designed by Lauritz de Thurah, is completed.
- Hermitage Hunting Lodge, designed by Lauritz de Thurah, is completed.
- Scots Mining Company House at Leadhills in Scotland, attributed to William Adam, is built (approximate date).
- North wing of house at Bregentved on the Danish island of Zealand, designed by Lauritz de Thurah, is completed.
- The Burrough's Building at Peterhouse, Cambridge, England, designed by James Burrough, is built.
- York House, St James's Palace, London, is built.
- Marschall Palais in Wilhelmstraße, Berlin, designed by Philipp Gerlach, is built.
- Hôtel de Hanau in Strasbourg is completed (begun in 1731)
- Hôtel de Klinglin in Strasbourg is completed (begun in 1732)

== Births ==
- March 21 – Claude Nicolas Ledoux, French neoclassical architect (died 1806)

== Deaths ==
- January 31 – Filippo Juvarra, Sicilian-born architect (born 1678)
- March 25 – Nicholas Hawksmoor, English architect (probably born 1661)
- October 22 – George Clarke, English politician, scholar and amateur architect (born 1661)
