= Bic Monastery =

Romanian Orthodox monastery

Coordinates: 47.23285°N 22.85000°E

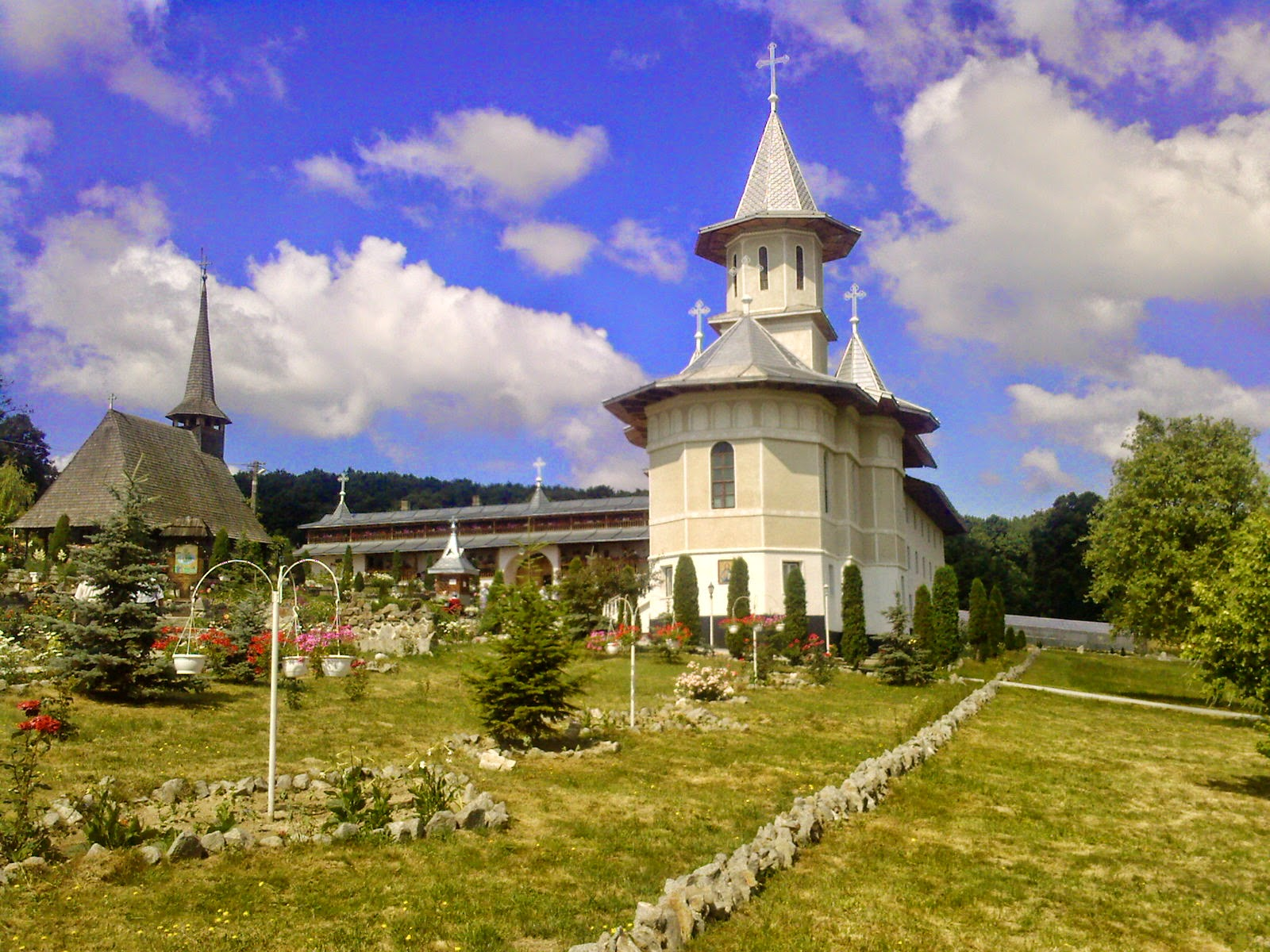

Religion
- Affiliation: Eastern Orthodox
- Ecclesiastical or organizational status: Monastery
- Leadership: Diocese of Oradea, Bihor and Sălaj
- Year consecrated: 1996
- Status: Active

Location
- Municipality: Bic
- Interactive map of Bic Monastery

Architecture
- Groundbreaking: 29 August 1994

The Bic Monastery (Romanian: Mănăstirea Sfanta Treime Bic) is a Romanian Orthodox monastery in Bic, Șimleu Silvaniei, Romania.

Since 1997, inside Bic Monastery, there is the wooden church from Stâna; built in 1778 it has a rectangular plan with nave and pronave.

== Photos ==
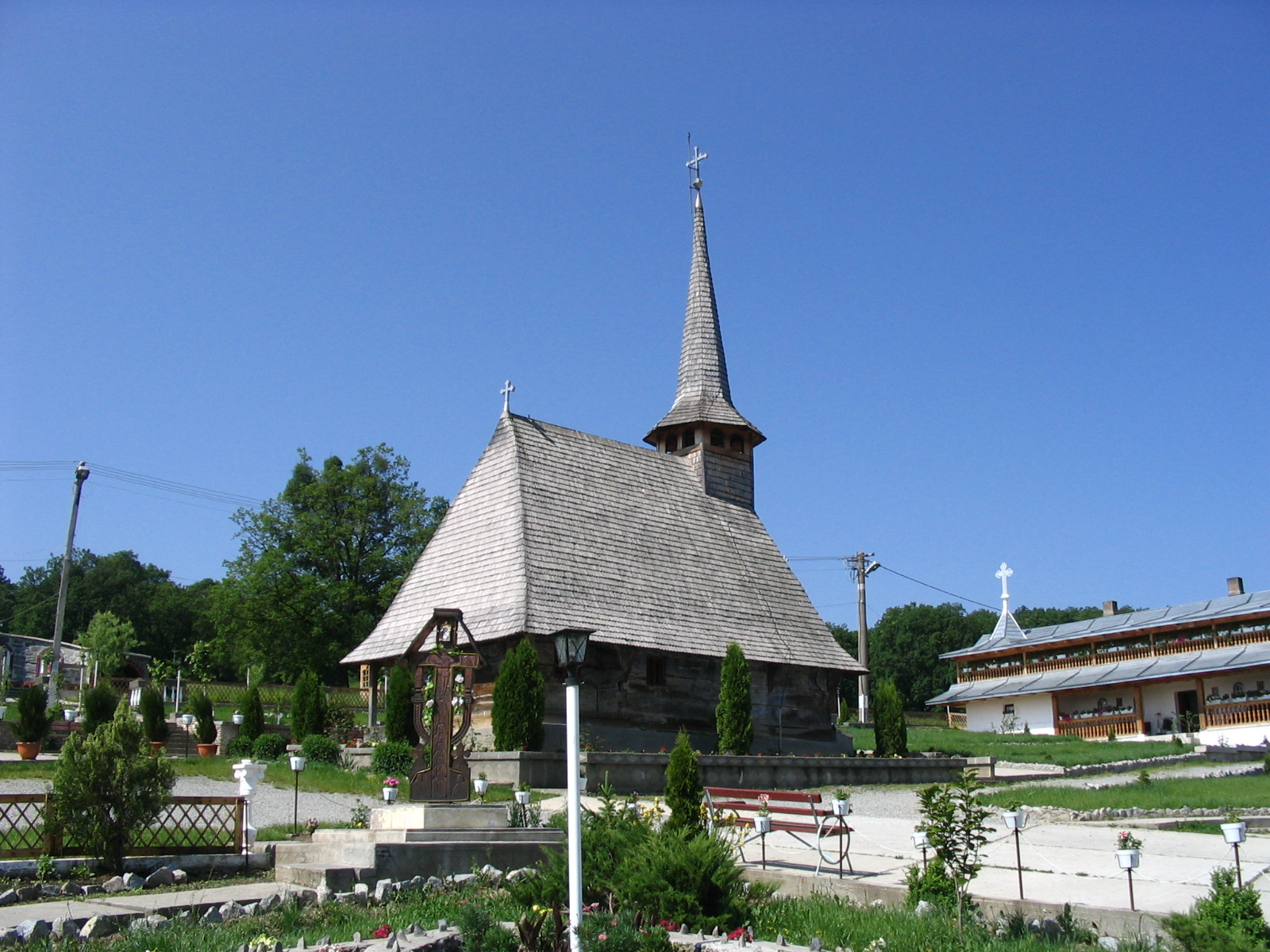

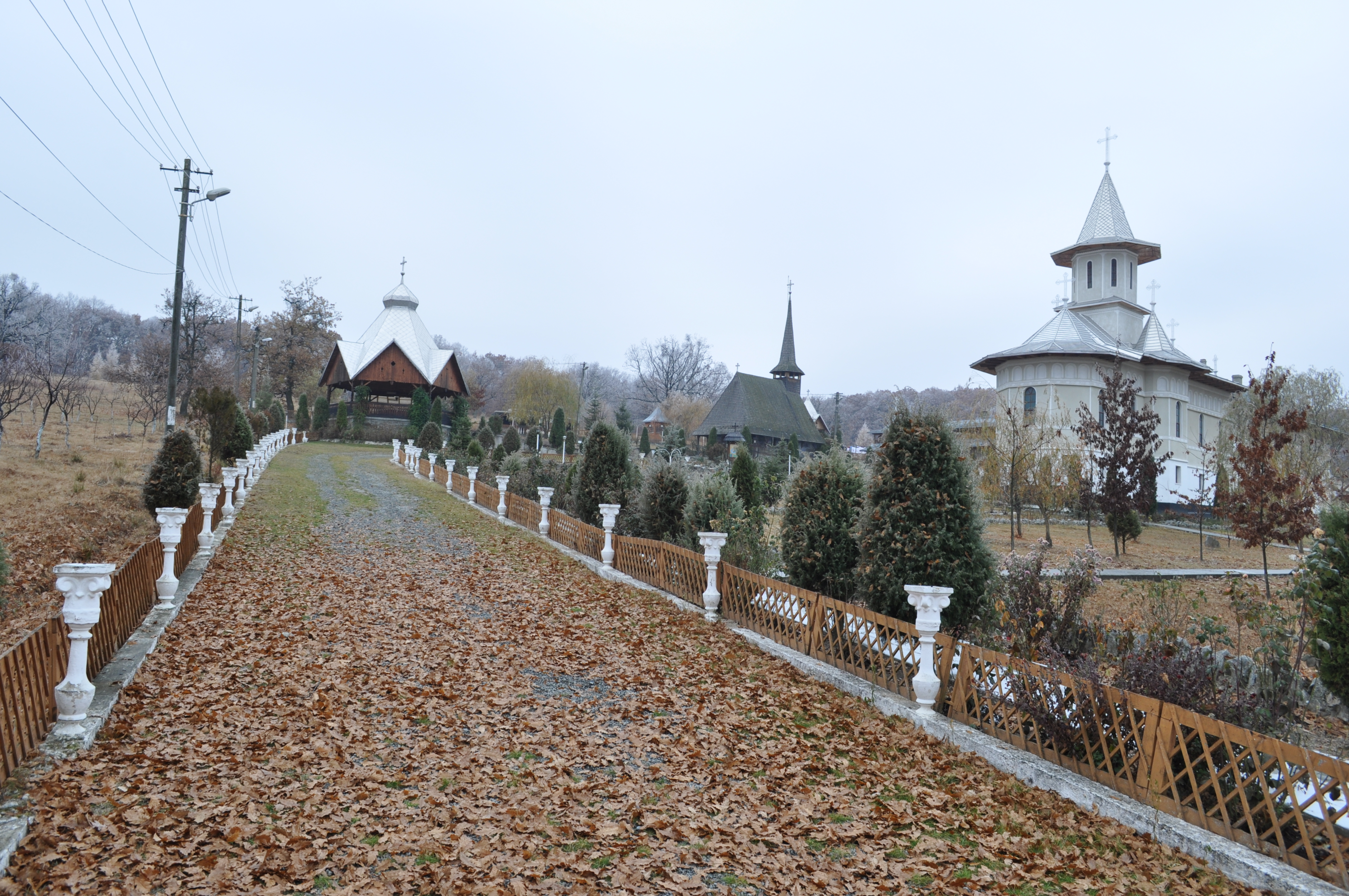

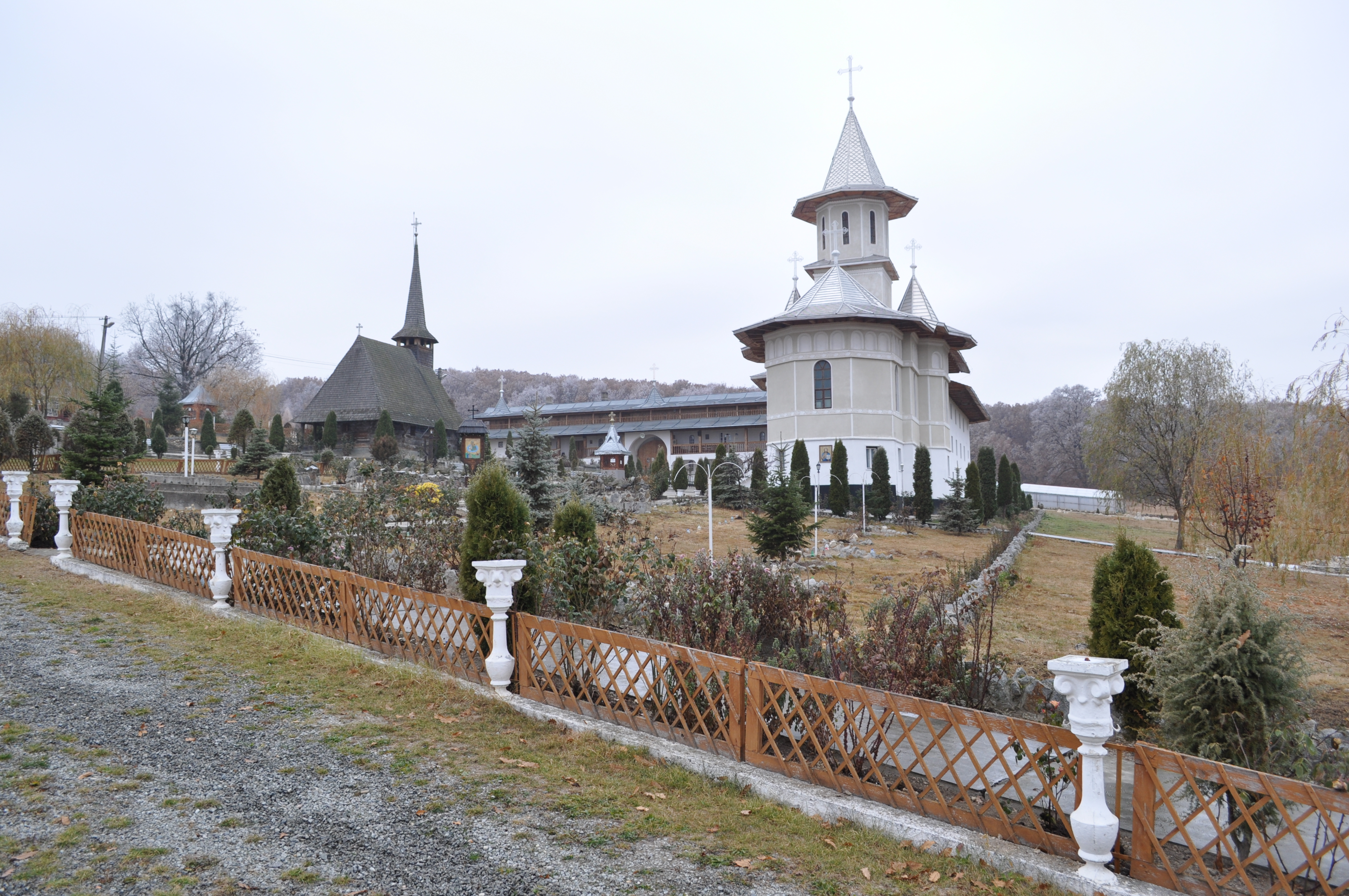

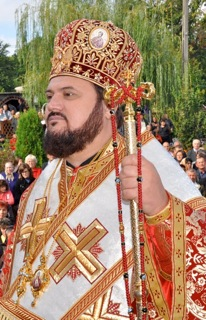

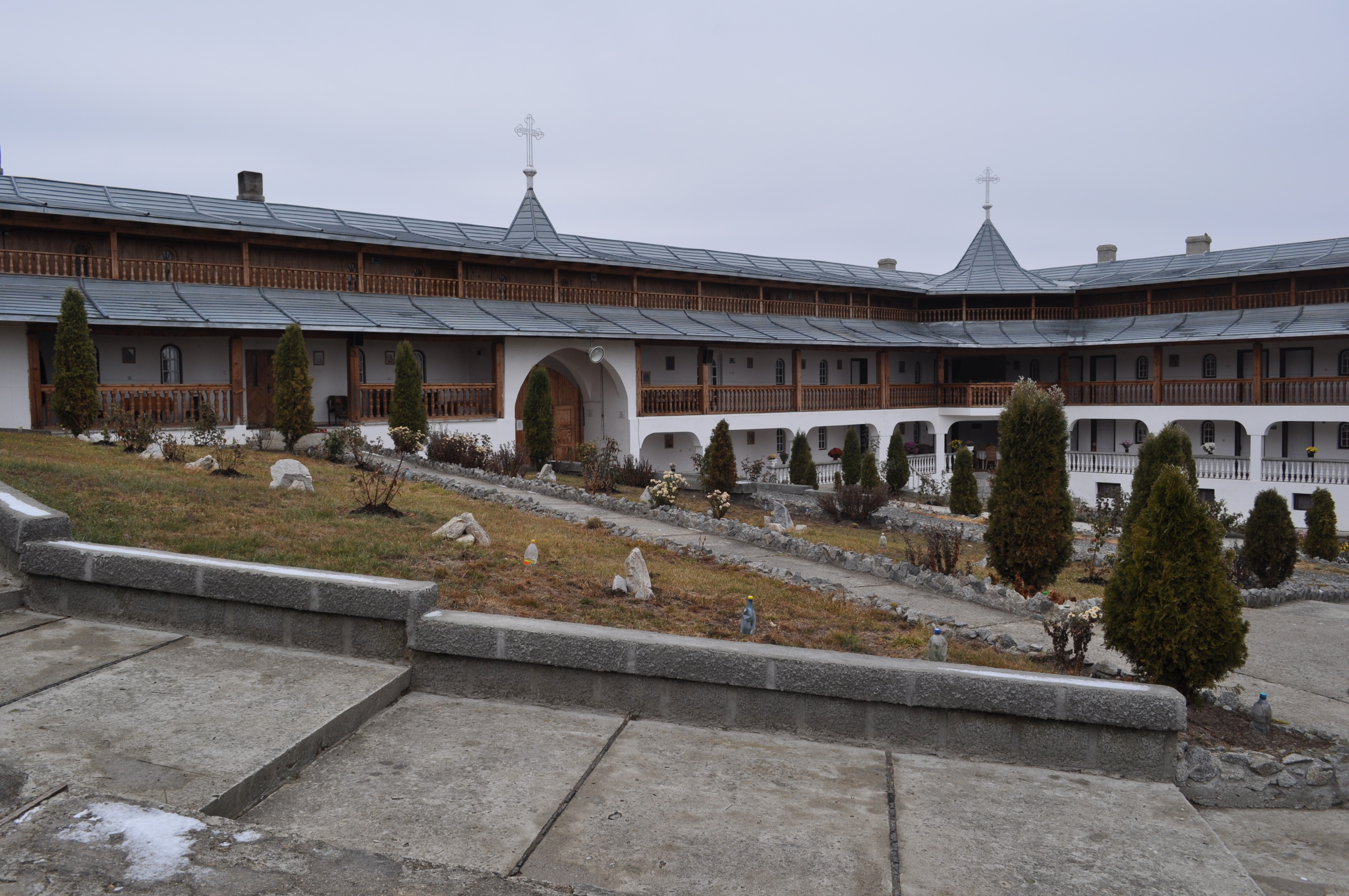

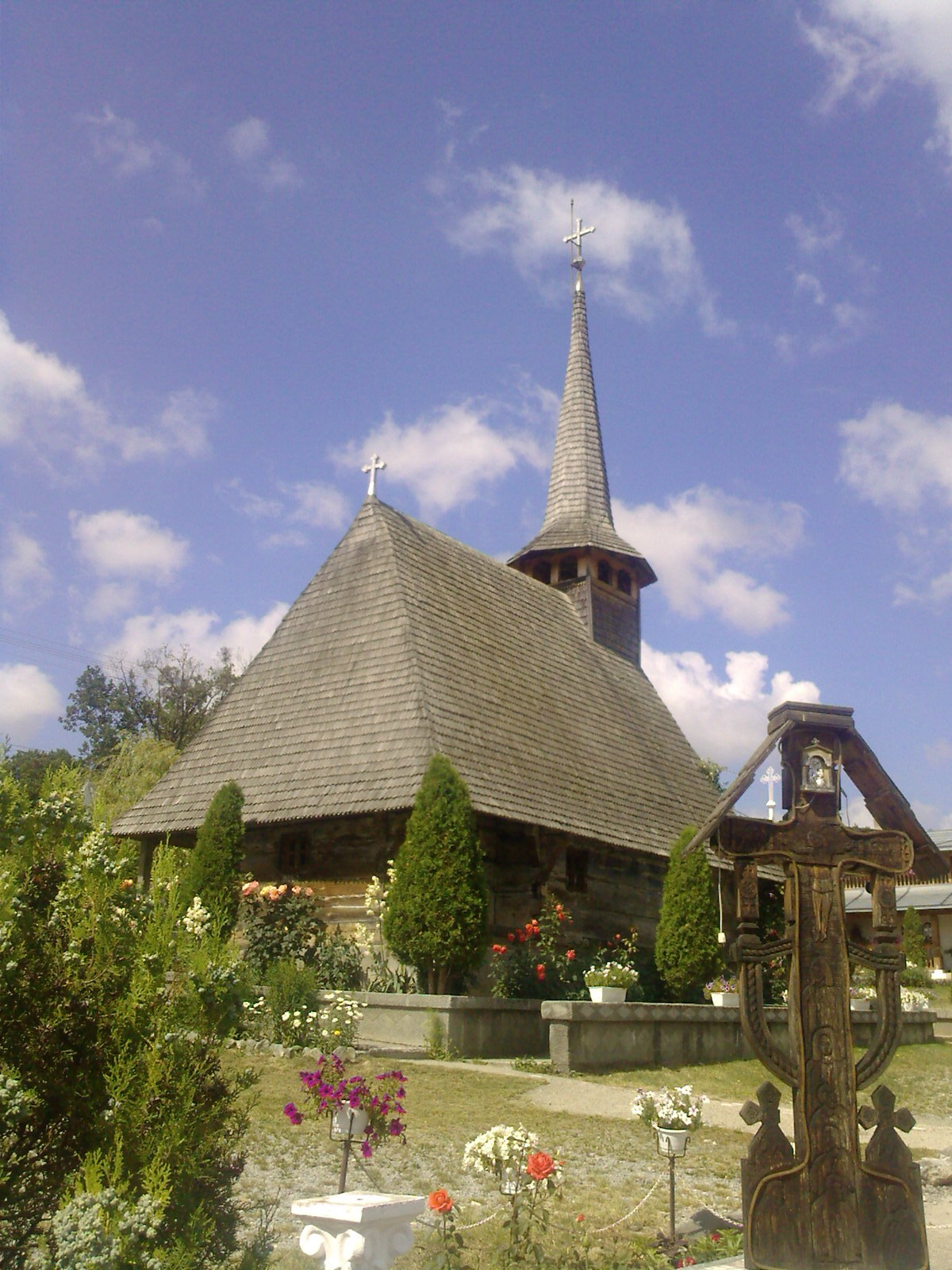

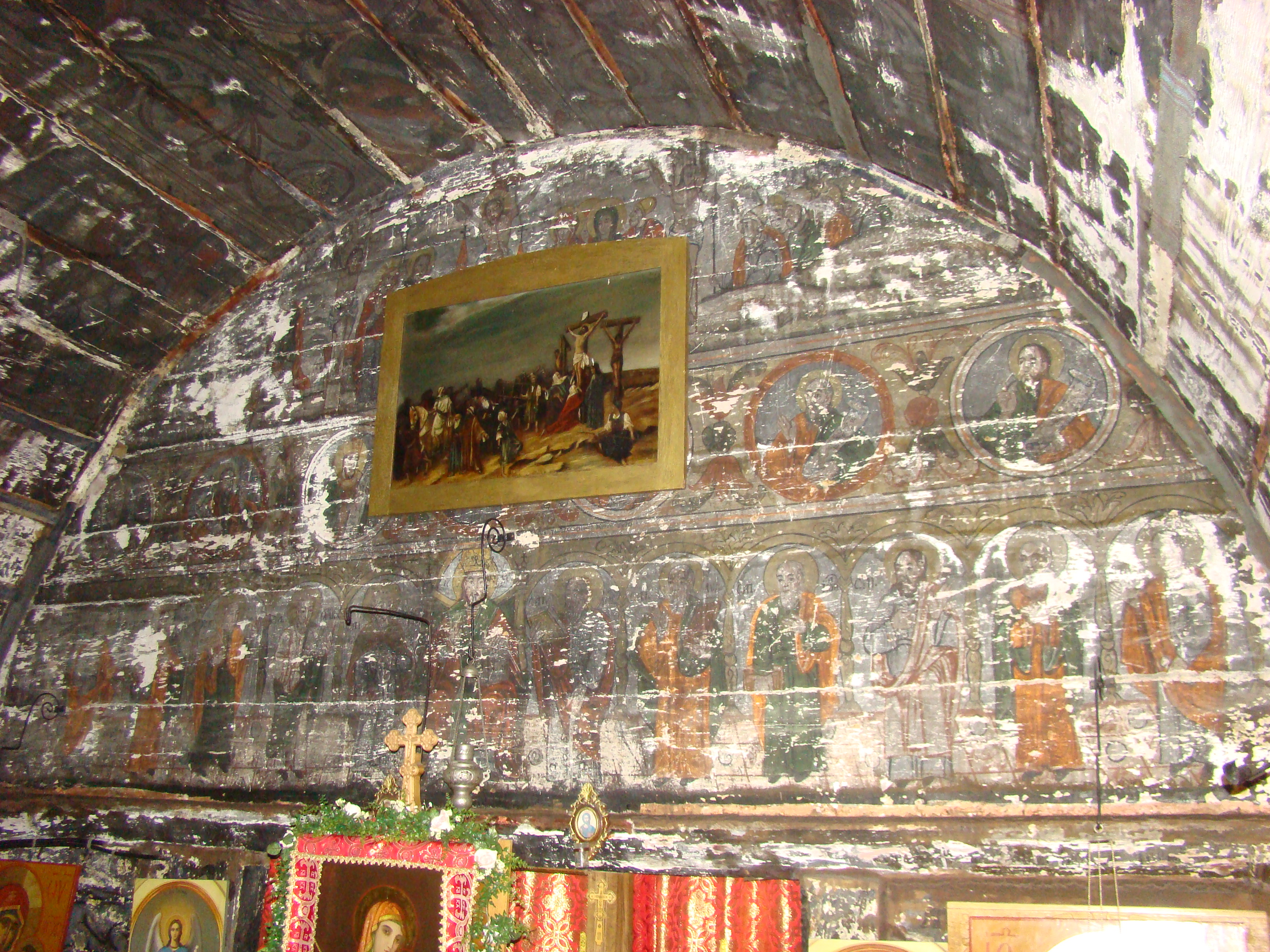

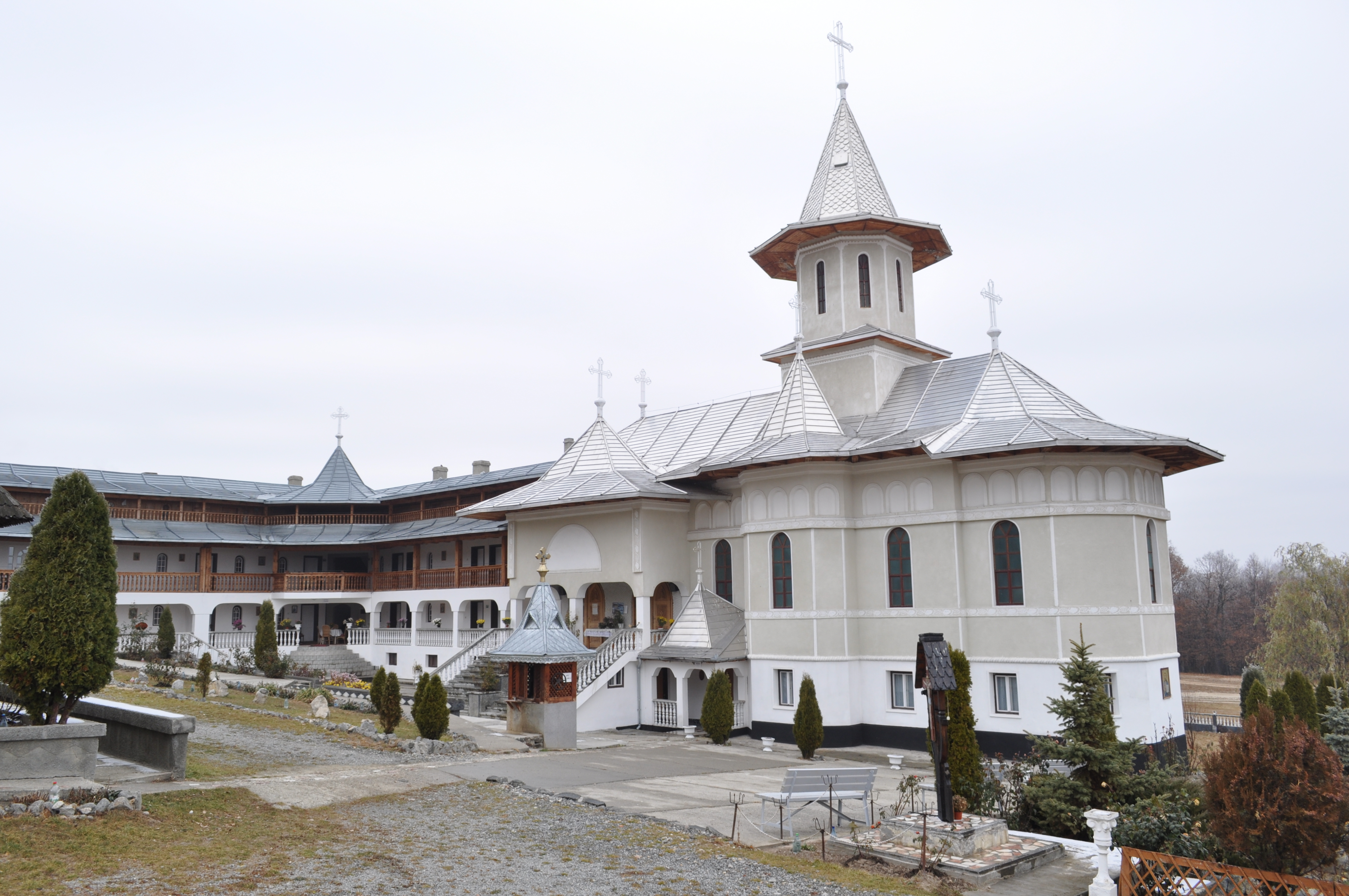
