= Gisella Grosz =

Hungarian pianist (1875–1942)

Gisella Grosz, originally Gizella Grosz (26 November 1875, Szilágysomlyó, Austria-Hungary – 1942, Riga Ghetto, Latvia) was a Hungarian classical pianist.

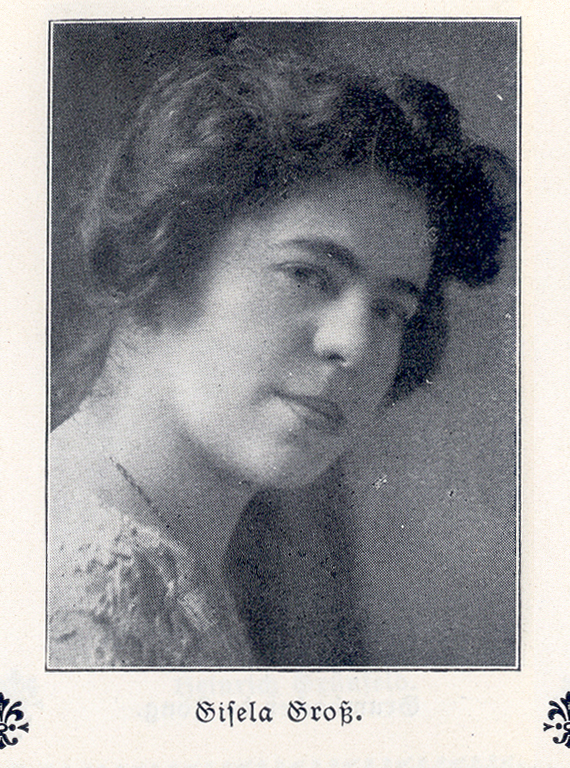
Gisella Grosz, about 1910

Grosz was born into a Jewish family in Szilágysomlyó, then Austria-Hungary, today Șimleu Silvaniei, Romania. She studied piano at the Royal National Hungarian Academy of Music in Budapest with István Thomán. In 1897 she gave her first concerts in Budapest and in 1898 and 1899 in Leipzig and Berlin with good success. From 1898 on she lived in Berlin, where she studied with Teresa Carreño.

She performed as a soloist with the Berlin Philharmonic in 1902, 1905, 1908 and 1909. On February 6, 1906 she was one of the first female pianists to record for Welte-Mignon.

In 1911, she retired from her concert career to marry Adolf Weissmann (1873–1929), a well known Berlin music critic and author of biographies of Bizet, Chopin, Verdi, and Puccini. Grosz continued as a teacher of the piano and hosted frequent musicales into the 1920s, until her husband's untimely death in 1929. She was listed in Berlin telephone directories from 1937 to 1940 as Gisella Weissmann (Weißmann). In 1940 the statutory Jewish middle name Sara was added to her listing, and in 1941 Jews were omitted altogether. In January 1942 she was deported to Riga, Latvia, and died there in that year.

Grosz and Weissmann had in 1908 a child born out of wedlock, Ilse. The daughter became a pianist too, taught mainly by her mother in Berlin and Konrad Wolff in Paris. From 1933 on Ilse Weissmann lived in France, England and Italy and finally emigrated to the US, where she died in 2000.
