= Dacidava =

- Location within Romania
- 47.2365°N 22.8007°E
- Location: Măgura Hill, Șimleu Silvaniei, Sălaj, Romania

Site notes
- Condition: Ruined

Dacidava was a Dacian fortified town, located in the North-Western part of present Transylvania, Romania, about 35 km North of the border established on Meseș Mountains, which was separating the dacian territory controlled by the Roman Empire and the territories inhabited by the free Dacians. It was built before ca. 5th century and it was in ruins by 1592. The city Șimleu Silvaniei is located near the ancient site of Dacidava.

== 3D Reconstructions ==
- Dacian fortress from Simleu Silvaniei (possibly the former Dacidava), virtual 3D reconstruction (hypothetical) v.1
