= Notre Dame Church, Șimleu Silvaniei =

Church in Șimleu Silvaniei, Romania

Coordinates: 47.23285°N 22.85000°E

Notre Dame Church
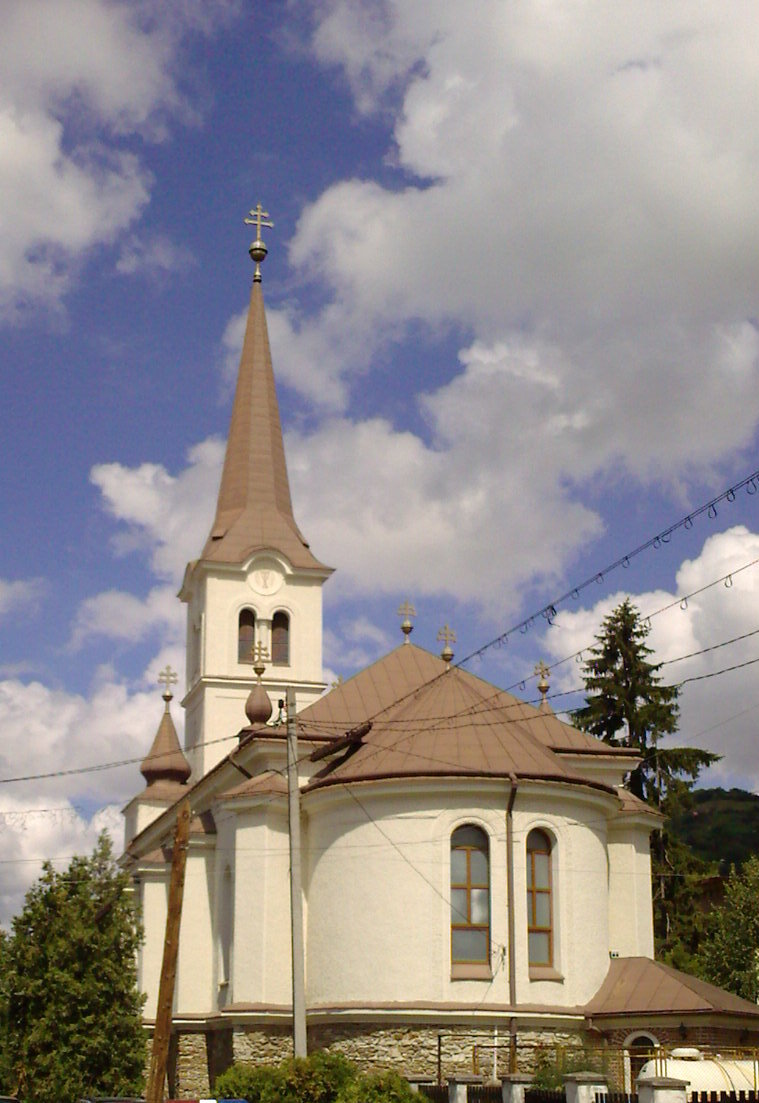

Religion
- Affiliation: Catholic
- Year consecrated: 1873

Location
- Municipality: Șimleu Silvaniei
- Interactive map of Notre Dame Church

The Notre Dame Church (Romanian: Intrarea în Biserică a Maicii Domnului) is a church in Șimleu Silvaniei, Romania. The church was built by the Romanian Greek Catholic community between 1871 and 1873. The iconostasis and peinture were completed in 1893, while Alimpiu Barboloviciu served as vicar.

== Photos ==
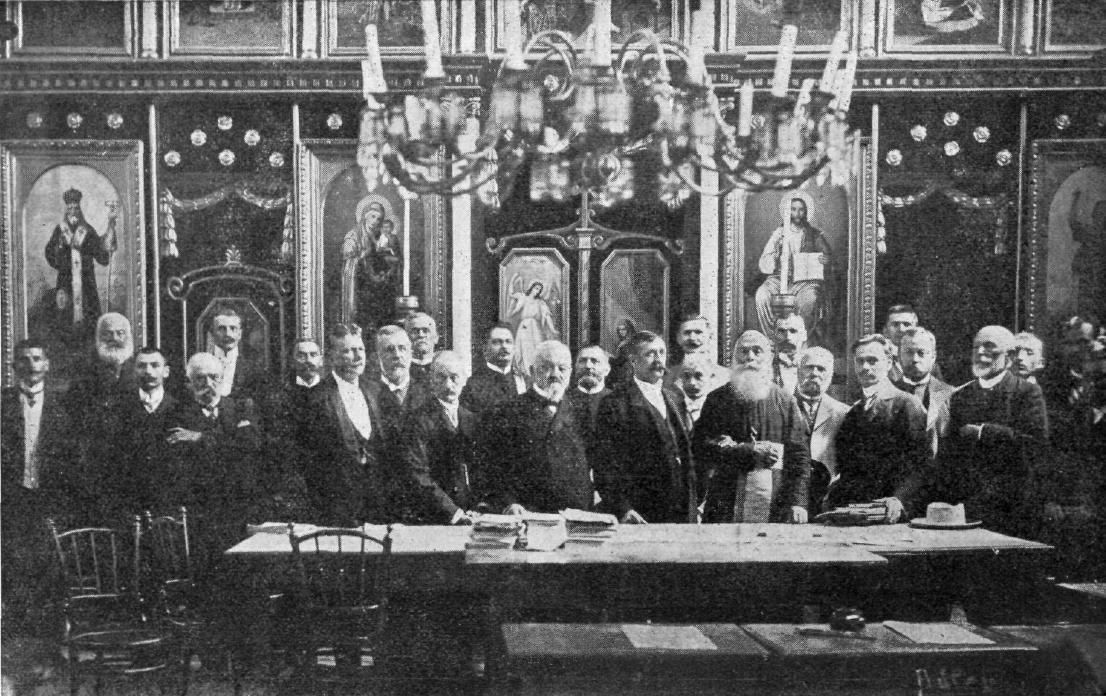
ASTRA group picture taken inside the church in August 1908
