= Simion Bărnuțiu National College =

- Colegiul Național Simion Bărnuțiu
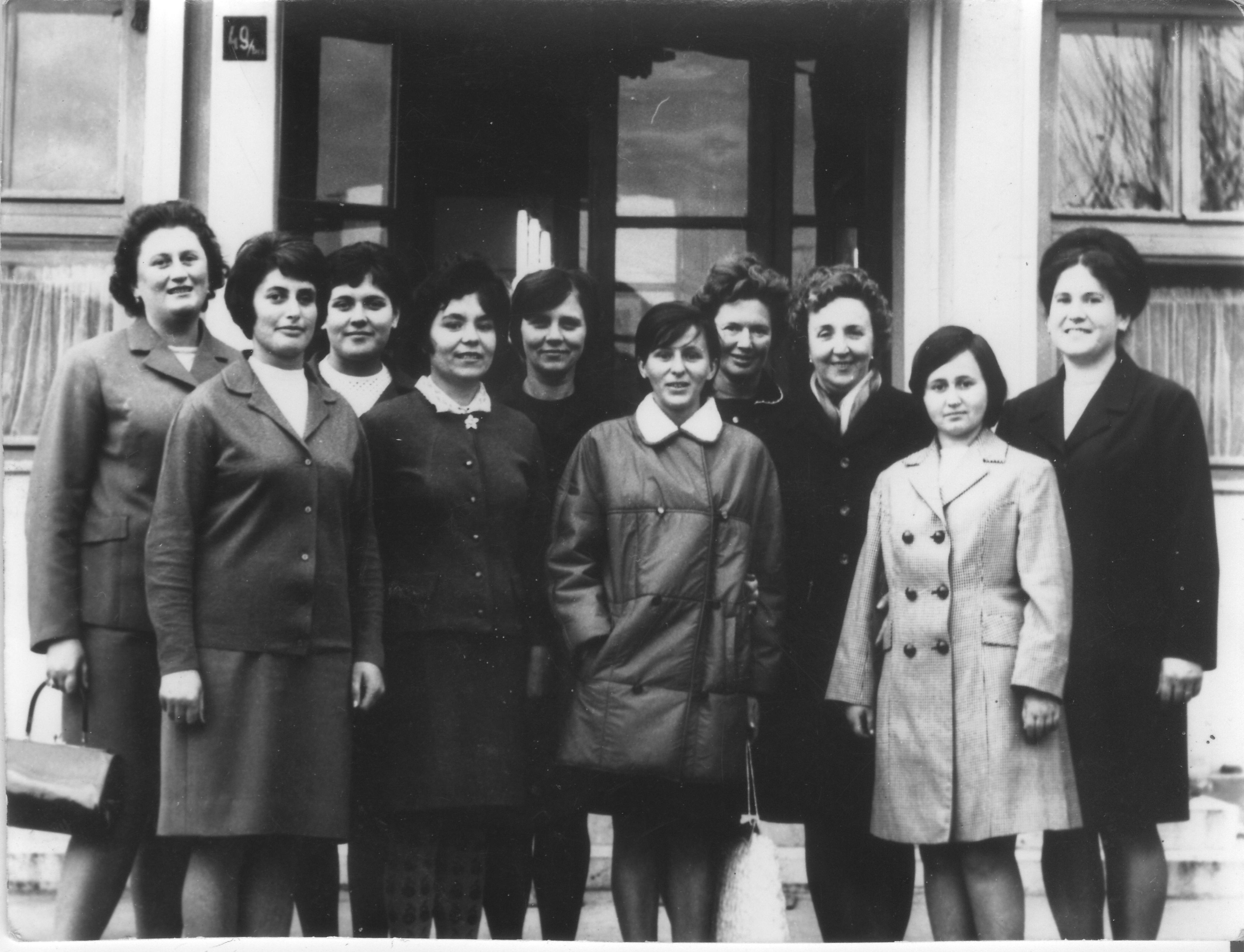
- Teaching staff (1969)

Location
- Strada 1 Decembrie 1918, nr. 49B; Șimleu Silvaniei, Sălaj County; Romania
- Coordinates: 47°13′N 22°48′E

Information
- Type: Public
- Established: October 1, 1919
- Website: colegiu-simleu.ro

The Simion Bărnuțiu National College (Romanian: Colegiul Național Simion Bărnuțiu) is a high school located at 49B 1 Decembrie 1918 Street, Șimleu Silvaniei, Romania, that opened on October 1, 1919.

The first principal was Ioan Ossian, a Latin and History teacher. In 1948, after the establishment of Communist Romania, the high school was shut down and was replaced by a professional school, the precursor of today's Ioan Ossian Technological High School. The high school was reopened in 1956 in a different location; the current building dates from 1965.

In 1990, right after the fall of communism, the school was renamed the Simion Bărnuțiu Theoretical High School. It was declared a national college in 2004.
