= Holy Trinity Statue, Șimleu Silvaniei =

Coordinates: 47°10′32.98″N 23°3′34.00″E

Holy Trinity Statue
- Statuia Sfintei Treimi
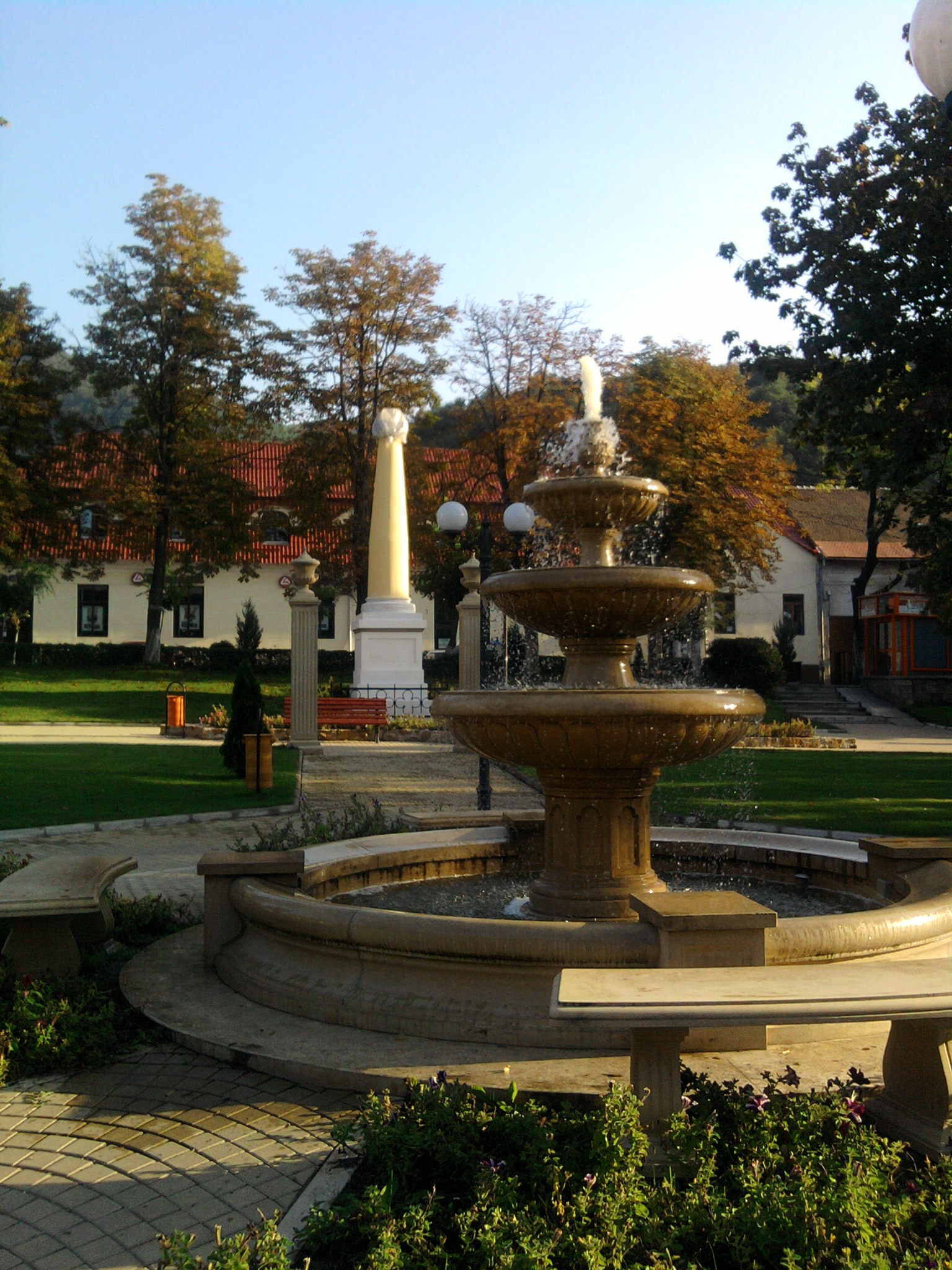
- Holy Trinity Statue is in the background
- Interactive map of Holy Trinity Statue
- Location: Șimleu Silvaniei; Romania
- Material: stone
- Opening date: 1772
- Dedicated to: Trinity

The Holy Trinity Statue (Romanian: Statuia Sfintei Treimi) is an obelisk in Șimleu Silvaniei, Romania.

== History ==
The obelisk was opened in 1772 as a sign of gratitude because plague avoided locality which affected the region; the Russian plague of 1770-1772 claimed tens of thousands of lives. The Holy Trinity Statue was never moved from its original place. The statue was renovated in 2010.
