= Wooden Church, Cehei =

Church in Cehei, Romania

- Biserica de lemn din Cehei
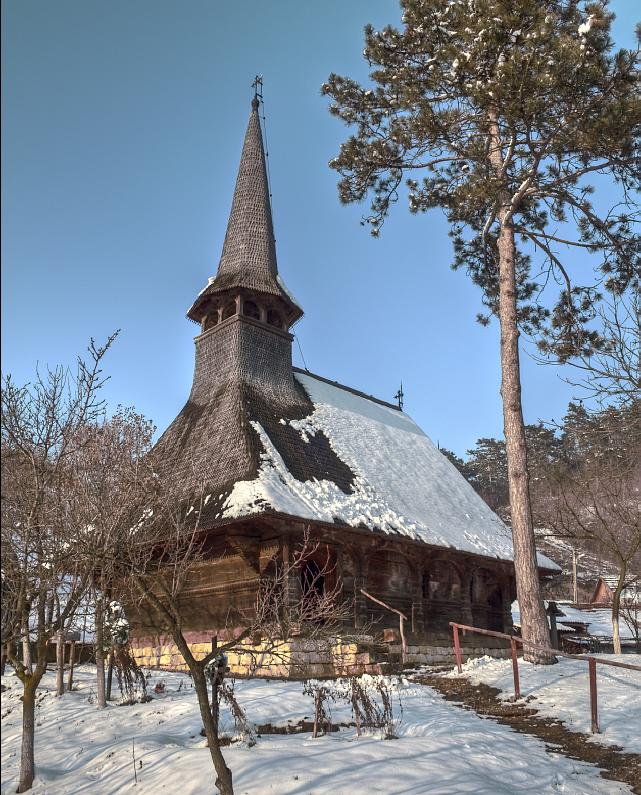

- Romania

Religion
- Affiliation: Eastern Catholic
- Region: Sălaj County
- Ecclesiastical or organisational status: parish church
- Year consecrated: 18th century

Location
- Location: Cehei
- Municipality: Cehei
- State: Romania
- Coordinates: 47.25714°N 22.77491°E

The Wooden Church (Romanian: Biserica de lemn din Cehei) is a church in Cehei, Romania, built in the 18th century.
