= Catholic Church, Șimleu Silvaniei =

Church in Șimleu Silvaniei, Romania

Coordinates: 47.23285°N 22.85000°E

Catholic Church
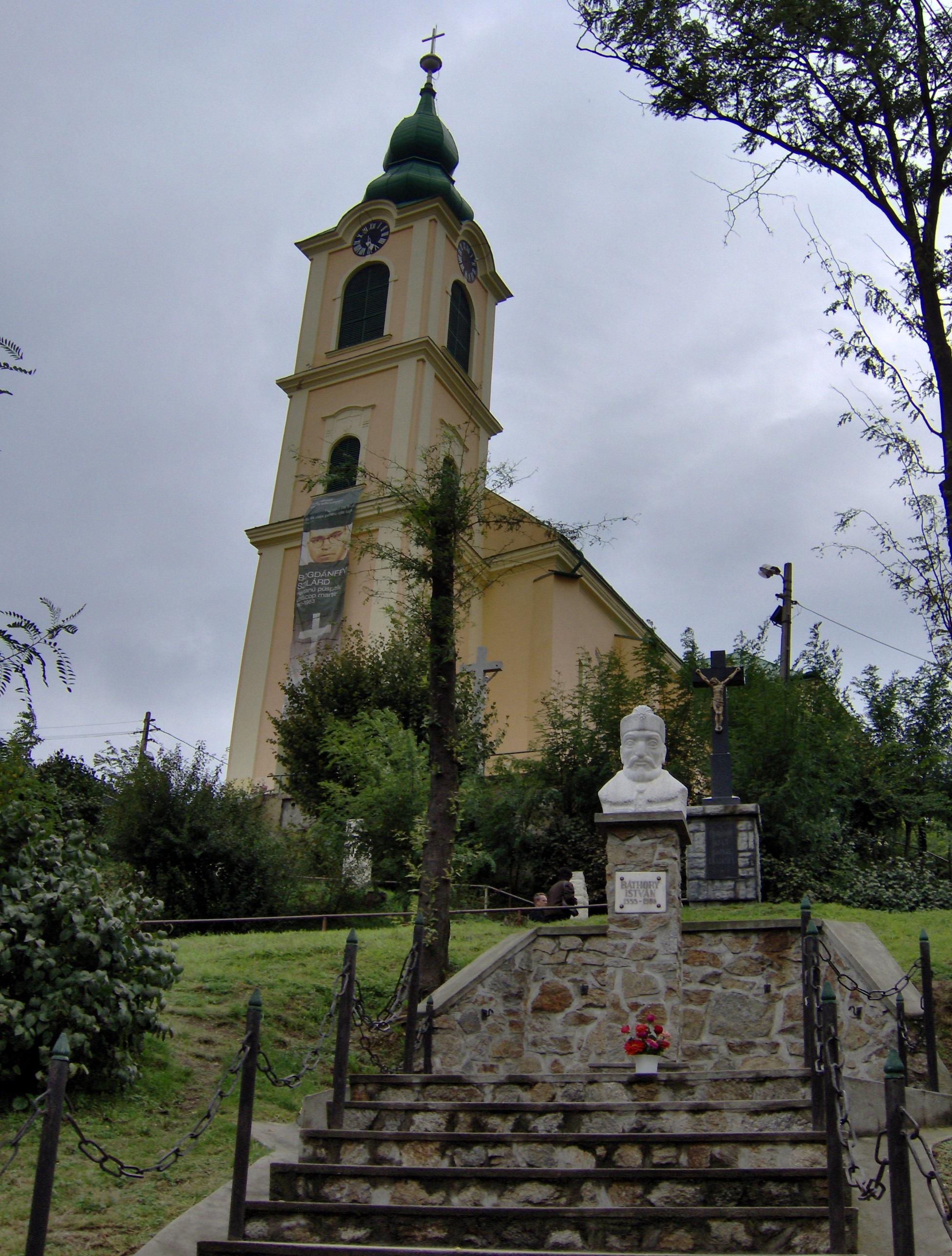
- The church and a bust of Báthory István

Religion
- Affiliation: Catholic
- Year consecrated: 1534

Location
- Municipality: Șimleu Silvaniei
- Interactive map of Catholic Church

The Catholic Church (Romanian: Biserica Catolică; Hungarian: Katolikus templom) is a church in Șimleu Silvaniei, Romania.

The church was built in 1534 by Transylvania's voivode Báthory István and his wife with the occasion of their son's birth.

== Photos ==
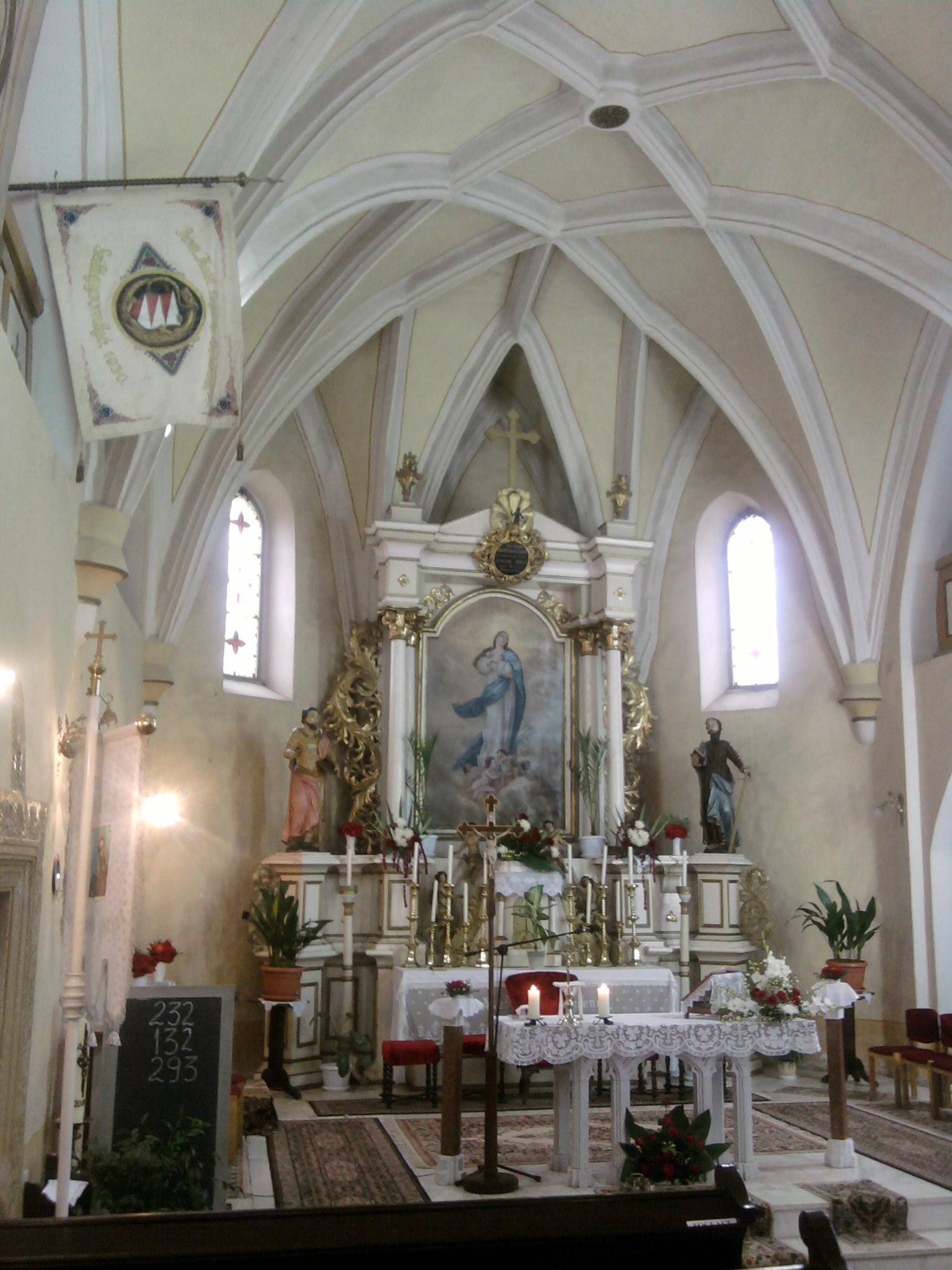

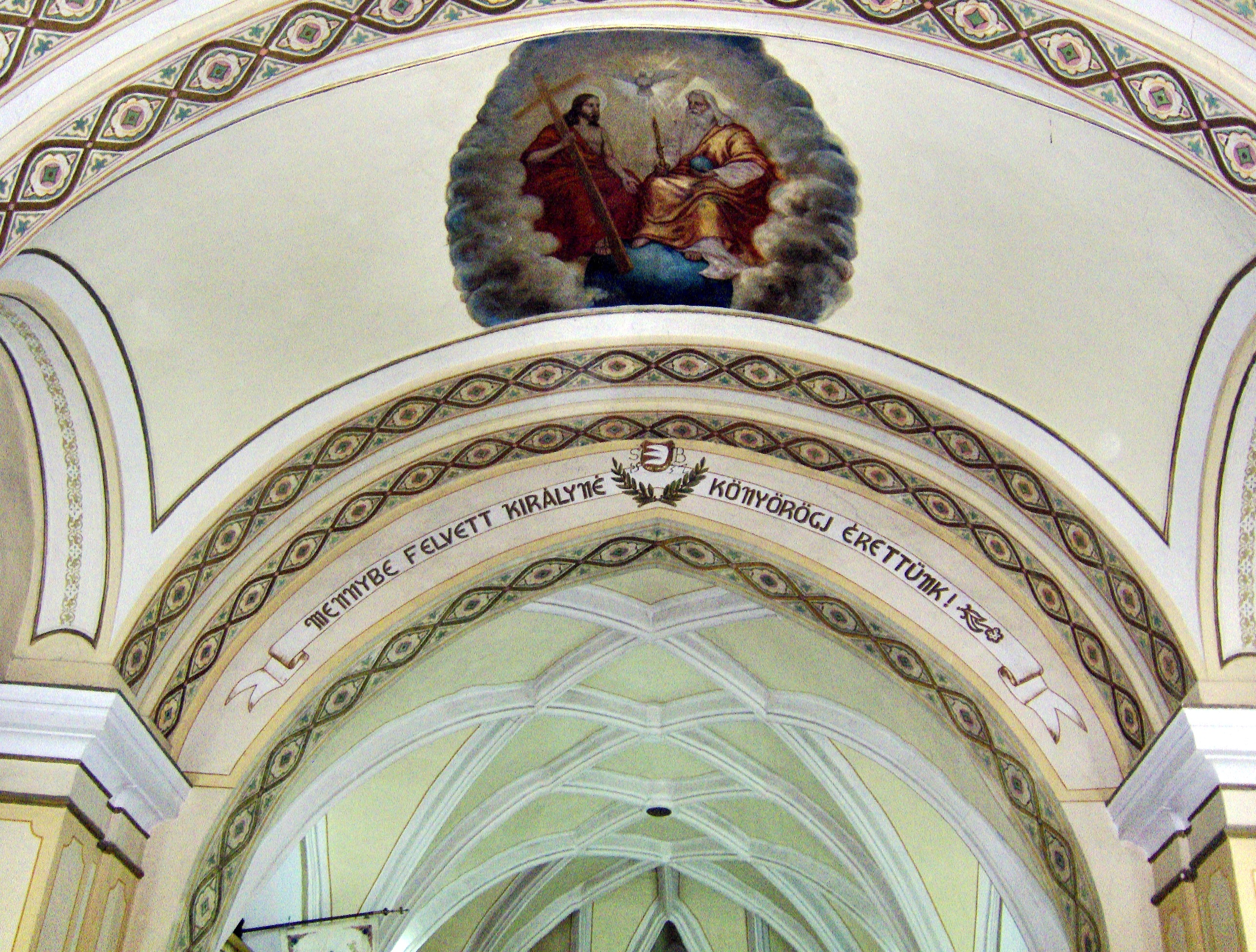

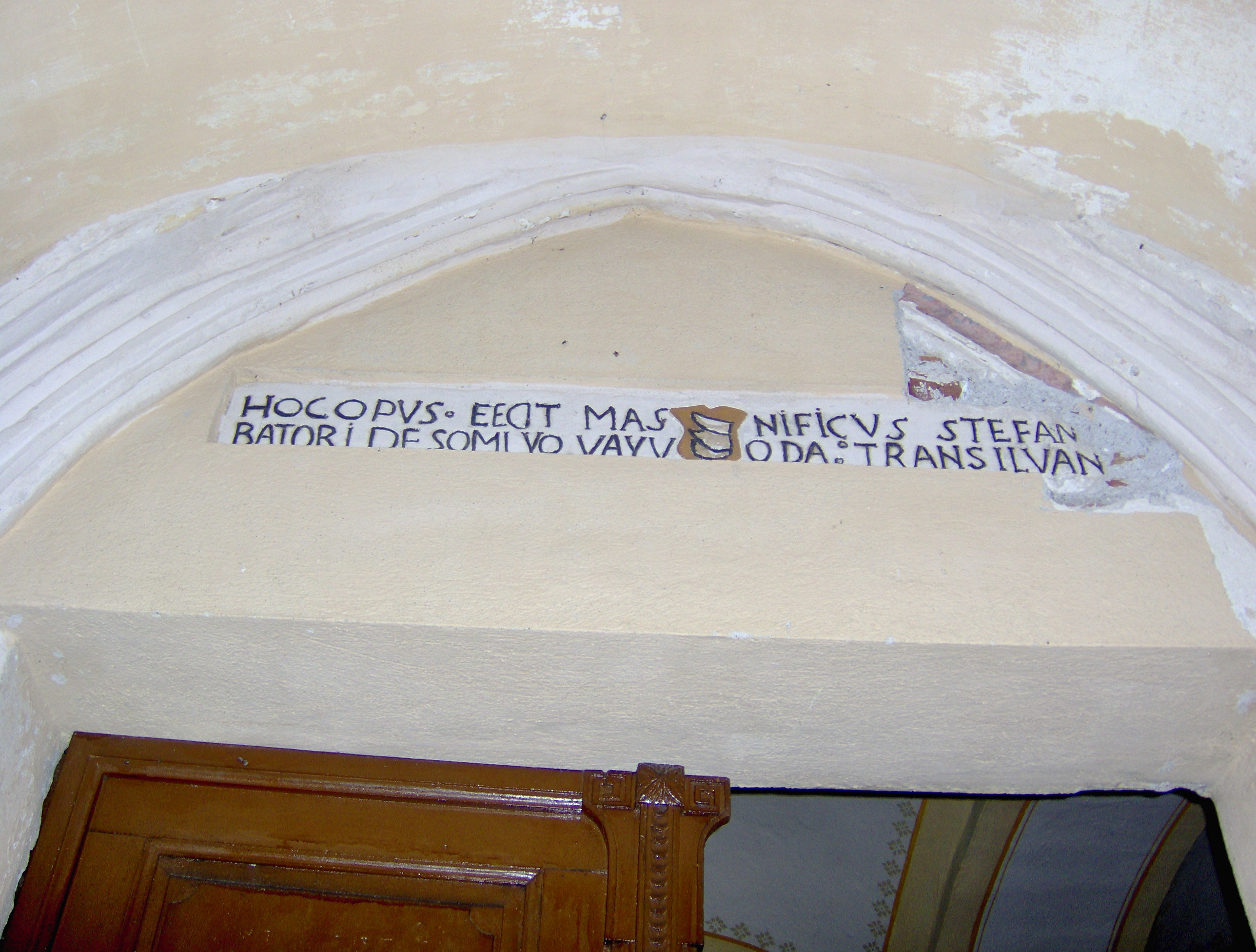

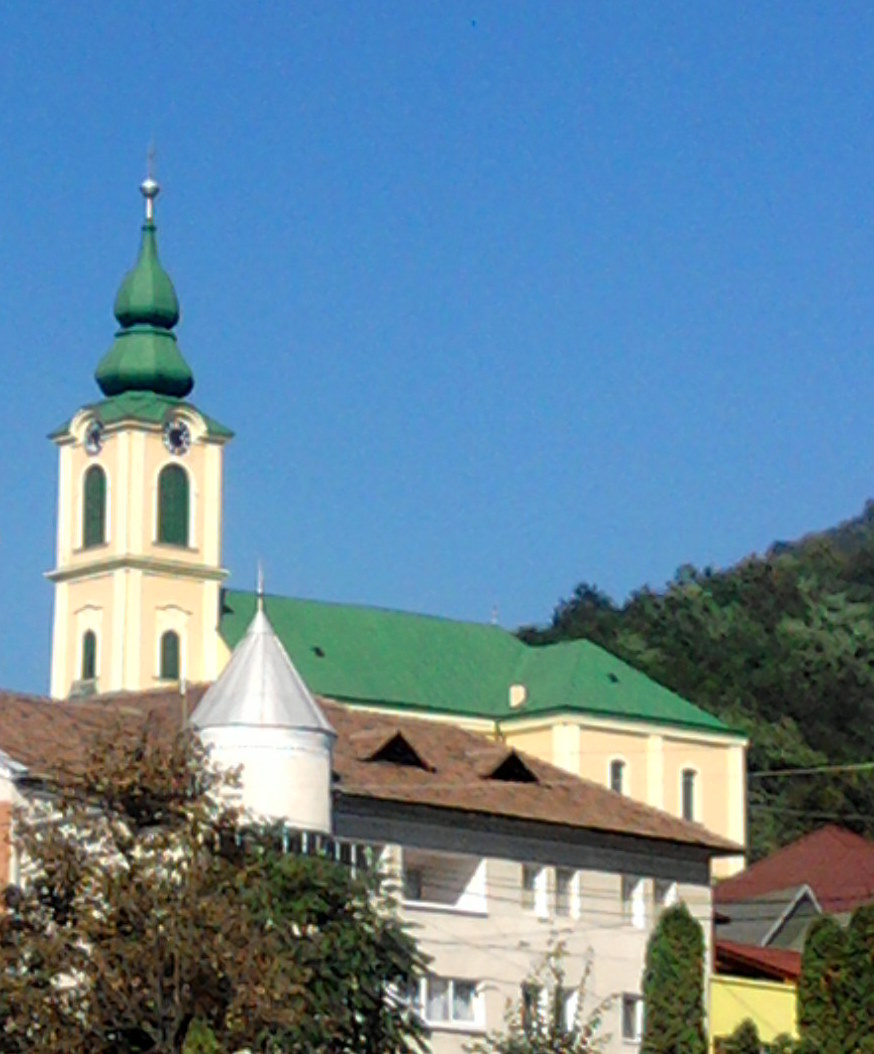
