= Transylvanian Association for Romanian Literature and the Culture of the Romanian People =

Organization based in Romania

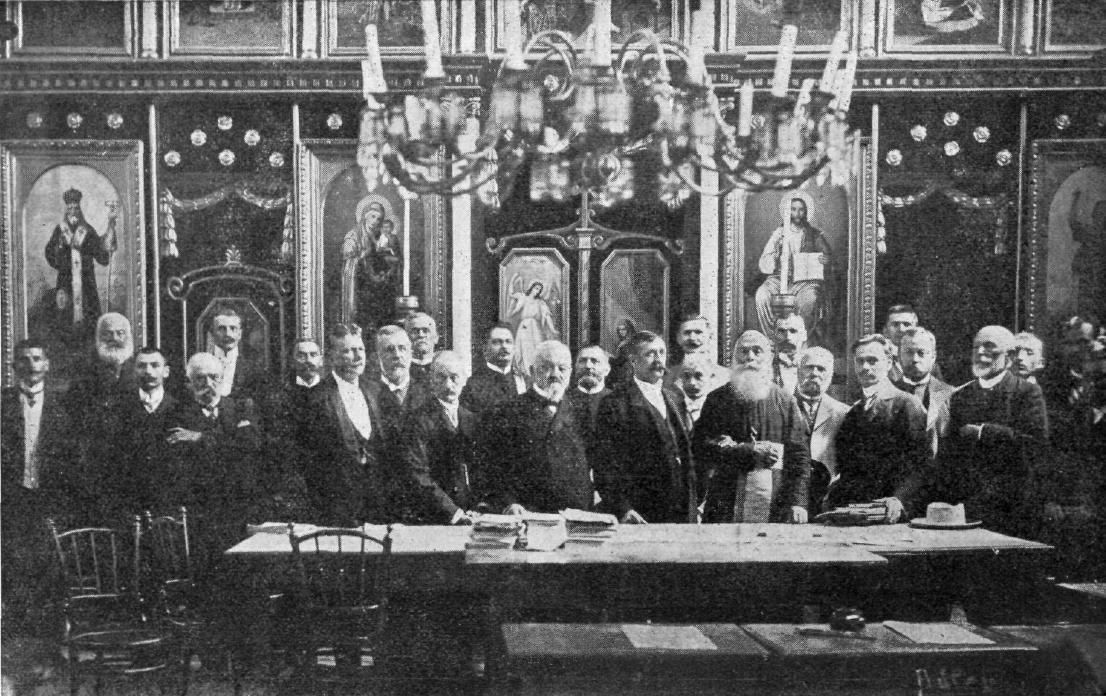
Picture of a group of ASTRA members at Notre Dame Church, Șimleu Silvaniei, August 1908 (published same year in Luceafărul)

The Transylvanian Association for Romanian Literature and the Culture of the Romanian People (Romanian: Asociația Transilvană pentru Literatura Română și Cultura Poporului Român, ASTRA) is a cultural association founded in 1861 in Sibiu (Hermannstadt). It had an important role in the cultural life and the movement of national awakening for the Romanians in Transylvania.

Its first president was the ethnic Romanian Orthodox Metropolitan of Sibiu — Andrei Şaguna. Its vice-president was the Greek-Catholic priest Timotei Cipariu, and George Bariţiu was secretary.

Shortly after its founding, the association established a boarding school, museum, and large library in its province of Sibiu, and later developed a network of ASTRA libraries in Transylvanian towns. On 7 February 1895, ASTRA decided to edit and publish a Romanian Encyclopedia under the supervision of Cornel Diaconovici. It was published in three volumes between 1898 and 1904, and had an important role in the culture and politics of the Romanians.

Today, the central ASTRA library contains approximately half a million works, mostly acquired through donations of the Transylvanian population, local publishing houses, or publication exchanges organized with other libraries.

== Gallery ==
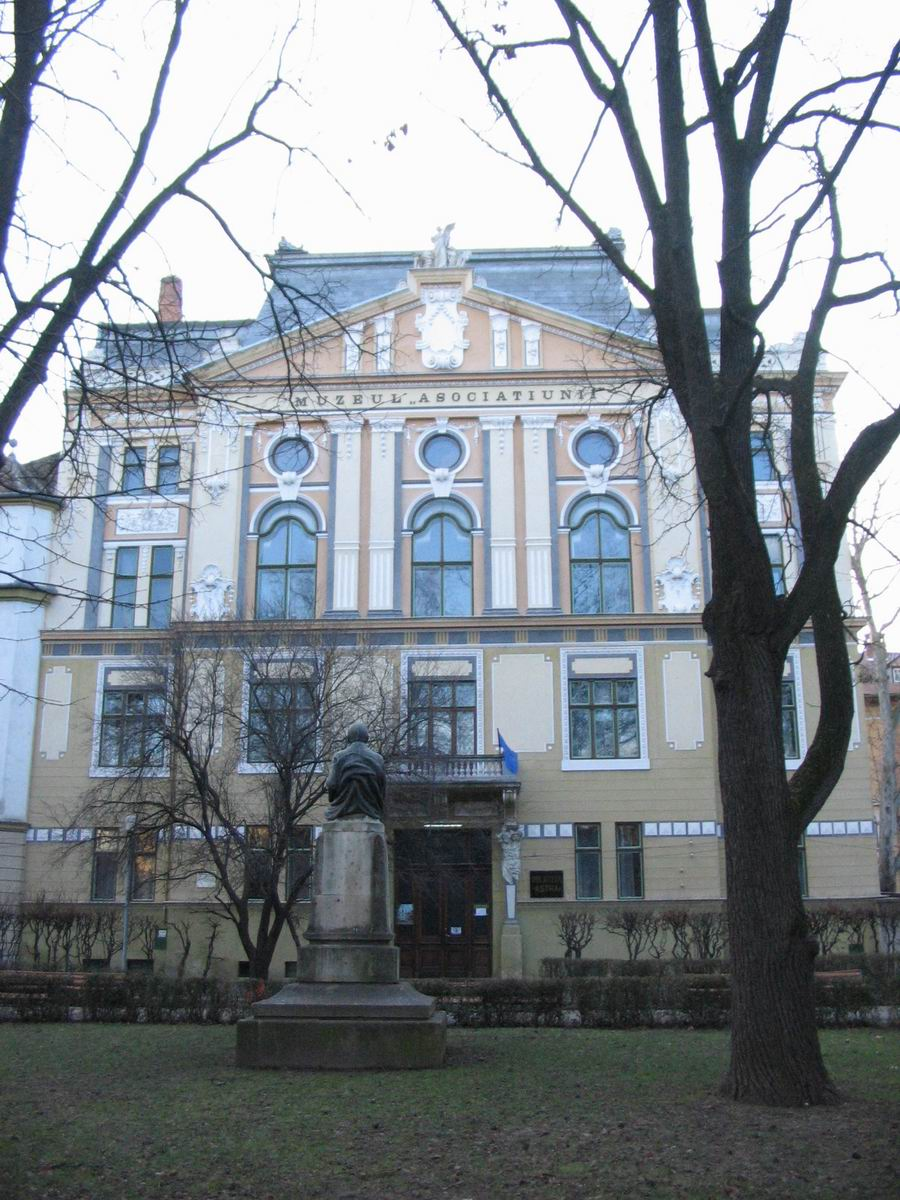
ASTRA Palace in Sibiu

== See also ==
- Transylvanian School
- ASTRA National Museum Complex
