= Reformed Church, Șimleu Silvaniei =

Building in Romania

Coordinates: 47.23285°N 22.85000°E

Reformed Church
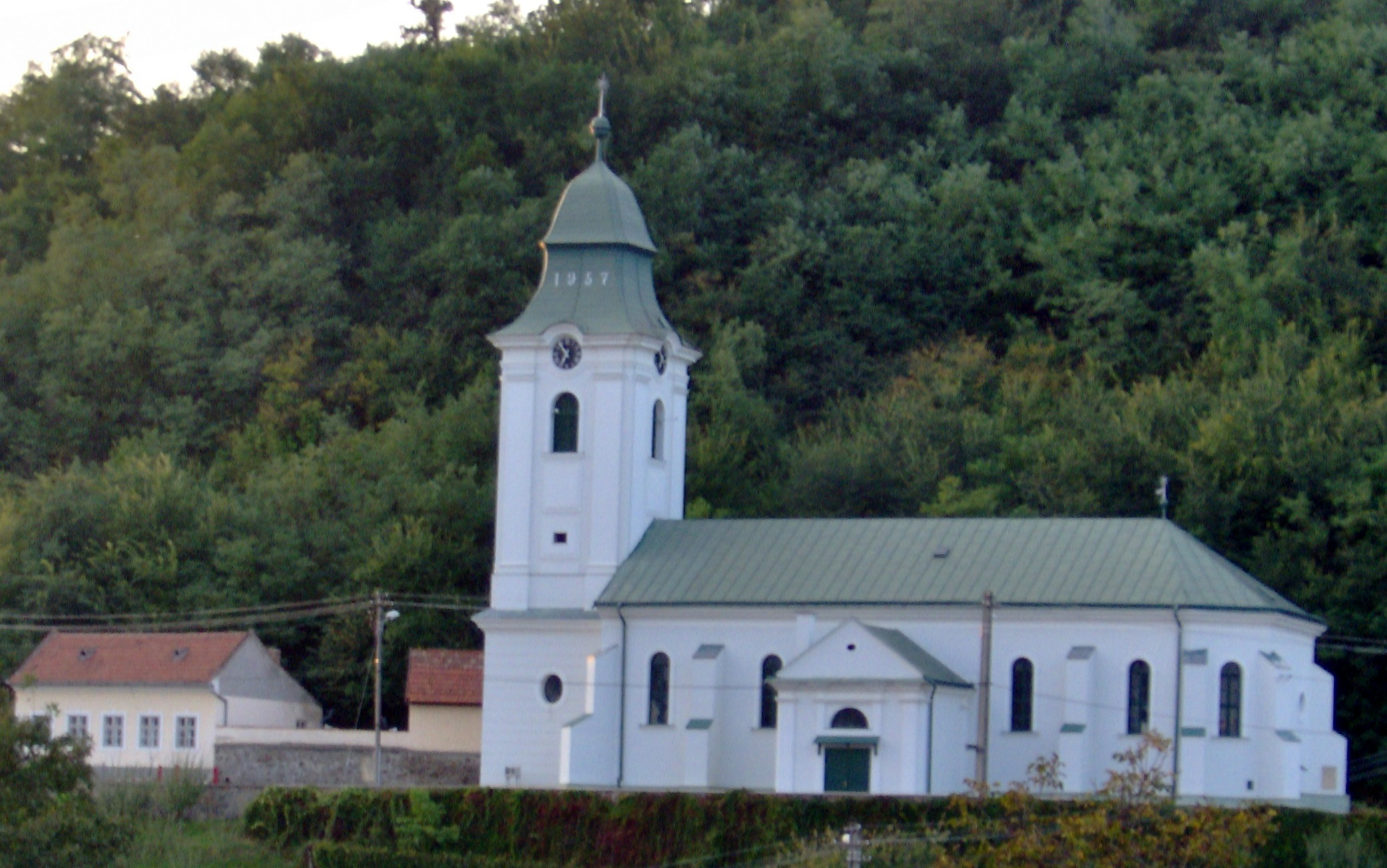

Religion
- Year consecrated: 1736

Location
- Municipality: Șimleu Silvaniei
- Interactive map of Reformed Church

The Reformed Church (Romanian: Biserica Reformată; Hungarian: Református templom) is a church in Șimleu Silvaniei, rebuilt between 1729 and 1736.

== Gallery ==
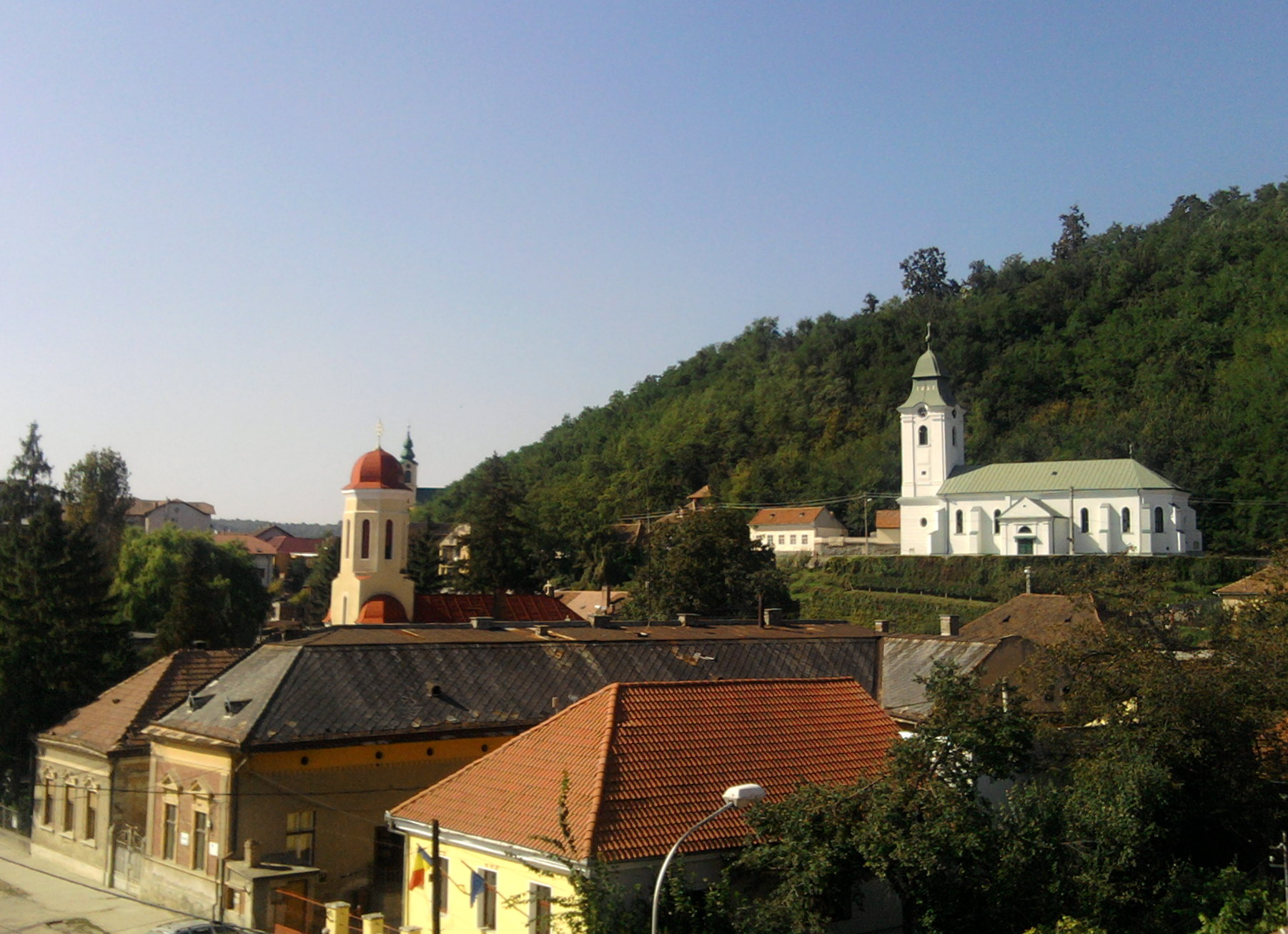
The Reformed Church and the Greek Catholic Church
