= Monographic sketch of Sălaj County =

Book by Dionisie Stoica

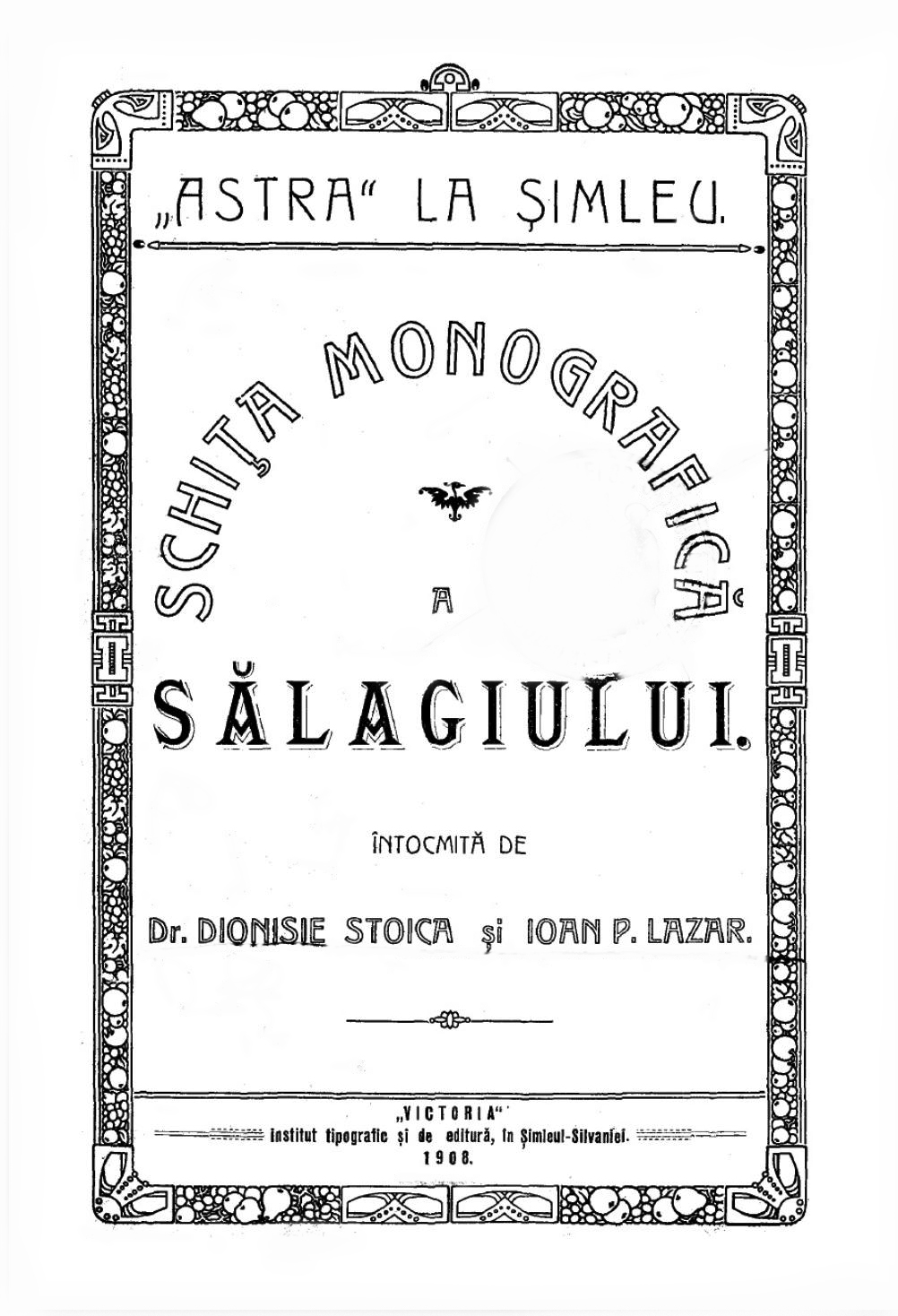
- Author: Dionisie Stoica, Ioan P. Lazăr
- Original title: Schița monografică a Sălagiului
- Language: Romanian
- Publisher: Victoria, Șimleu Silvaniei
- Publication date: Pentecost, 1908
- Publication place: Hungary
- Pages: 331

Monographic sketch of Sălaj County (Romanian: Schiţa monografică a Sălagiului) is a book about Szilágy County edited by Dr. Dionisie Stoica and Ioan P. Lazăr. The book was awarded "Andrei Mureșanu" Prize of Astra for "the best literary book of the year 1908 in Hungary."

== Overview ==
The book was written and appeared in 1908, shortly before the General Annual Meeting of Astra, held between August 6 to 9, 1908 in Șimleu Silvaniei. The committee that organized celebrations attended by 380 guests consisted of the following persons: Ioan P. Lazăr, president and Coriolan Meseșian and Dionisie Stoica as secretaries.

At a conference held on March 19, 1908, the leaders of the Romanian community from Szilágy County decided to invite Asociația Transilvană pentru Literatura Română și Cultura Poporului Român to hold its General Annual Meeting in Şimleu. At that moment the editors started the work on the monograph as they declare in the introduction. The entire project was completed in just a few months, taking into account that the introduction is dated "Şimleu at Pentecost, 1908". Contributors to the volume of 331 pages include: Victor Rusu, Grațian Flonta, Gavriil Trif, Teofil Dosa, Carol Torma. The work of Petri Mór, "Szilágyi vármegye monográfiája," was used as a bibliography.

The first third of the book covers the main characteristics of the history of the Romanian Community in Szilágy County. This overview is followed by a presentation of every community of the Szilágy County, like in this example: "Lompirt (Hungarian: Lompért, pretura Şimleu) is a village mainly inhabited by ethnic Hungarians. There are 244 Romanian ethnic inhabitants and all are Greek Catholics and belong to the parish Giurtelecu Şimleului. It is not known in what year the church was built. The Romanian Greek Catholic Community has kept records since 1823. There are 26 Romanian students and they attend school in Hungarian. There is no teacher to teach in Romanian language." The editors pay closer attention to bigger communities, like this:

Giurtelecul Şimleului (Hungarian Somlyógyörgytelek, pretura Şimleu) is the largest Romanian community around Şimleu. Old inhabitants were serfs belonging to Şimleu fort and almost all were Romanian. In 1733 the community formed by 12 families was served by the Greek Catholic priest George. Today Giurtelecu has 280 households, with 1,237 Greek Catholics. The stone church was built in 1819, with money raised from the parishioners. Religious school of stone is under construction and has a qualified teacher with a salary of 1,400 krone, of which 800 krone is paid by the state. There are 60 children enrolled in school and all of them are literate; there are also 51 students in the program of education for those between the ages of 12 and 15. There are more than 120 literate adults, of whom only 11 know Hungarian. The settlement has 2,048 arpents, of which 1,395 are in the hands of the Romanians. The price of an arpent ranges from 600 to 1,200 krones. There are 80 voters, of whom 40 know to read and write Romanian and 5 Hungarian as well.

== Awards ==
Soon after 1908 General Annual Meeting of Astra, Octavian Tăslăuanu, a high level member of the association, paid a high respect to Dionisie Stoica and Ioan P. Lazăr: "Authors deserve all praise for the work because they were able to give us valuable and interesting information on Sălaj." In a report dated on July 1, 1909, Andrei Bârseanu, the referent of the literary section of Astra, proposed "Andrei Mureșanu" Prize to be awarded for "Schiţa monografică a Sălagiului." Bârseanu wrote in the report that the book is "conducted after a well determined plan and gives us valuable information about a land little known. Especially the chapters "Ethnographic data" and "Șimleu and villages in Sălaj" and statistical tables are very instructive material and would also be very useful as such data to be collected about other regions." The report is presented to the plenary session of the science and literary sections of Astra in Sibiu on July 15, 1909. The plenary session voted for the proposal and "Andrei Mureșanu" Prize on 1908 is awarded for "Schiţa monografică a Sălagiului. The prize of 300 krone went to Dr. Dionisie Stoica and Ioan P. Lazăr.

== Gallery ==
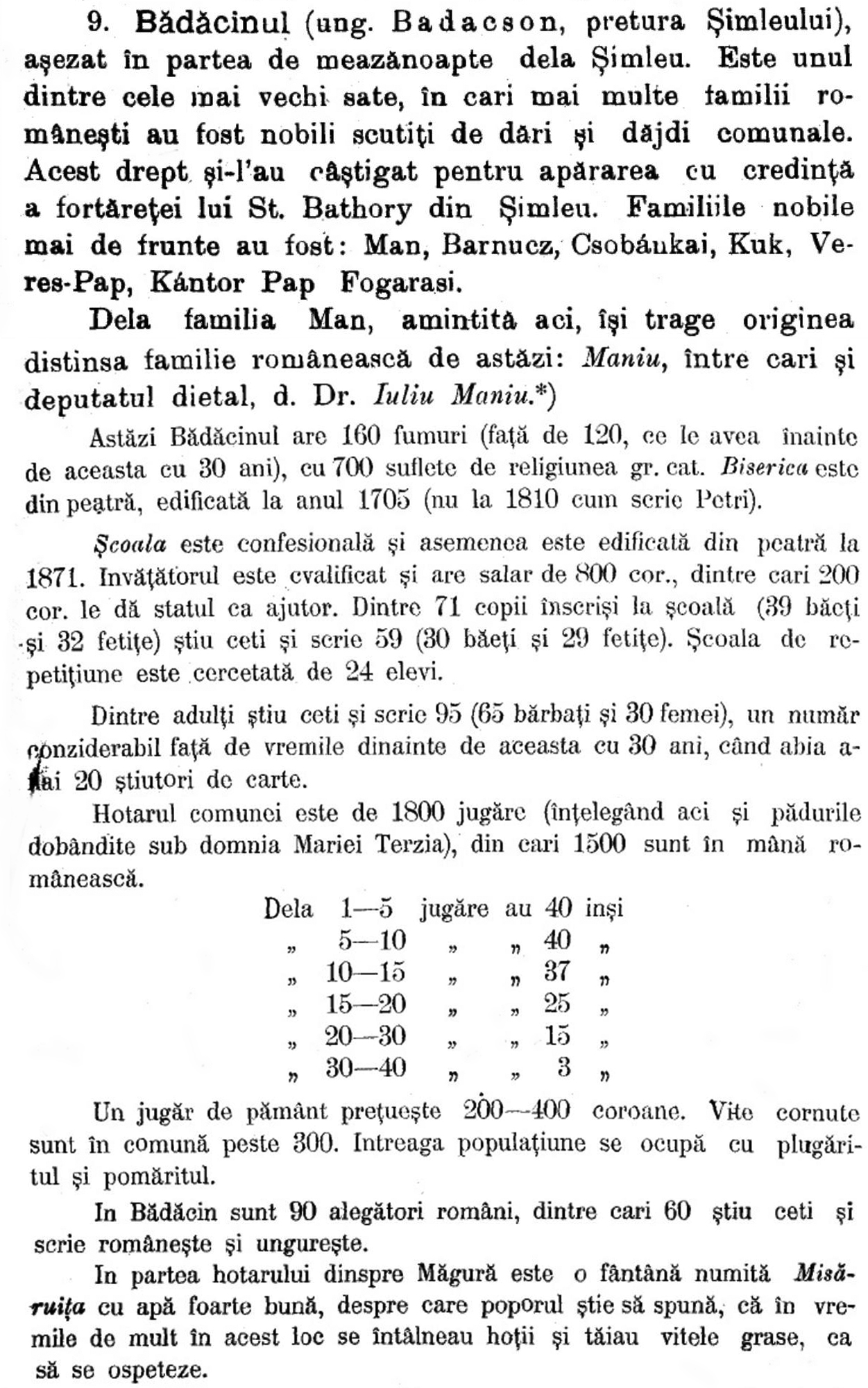
Bădăcin

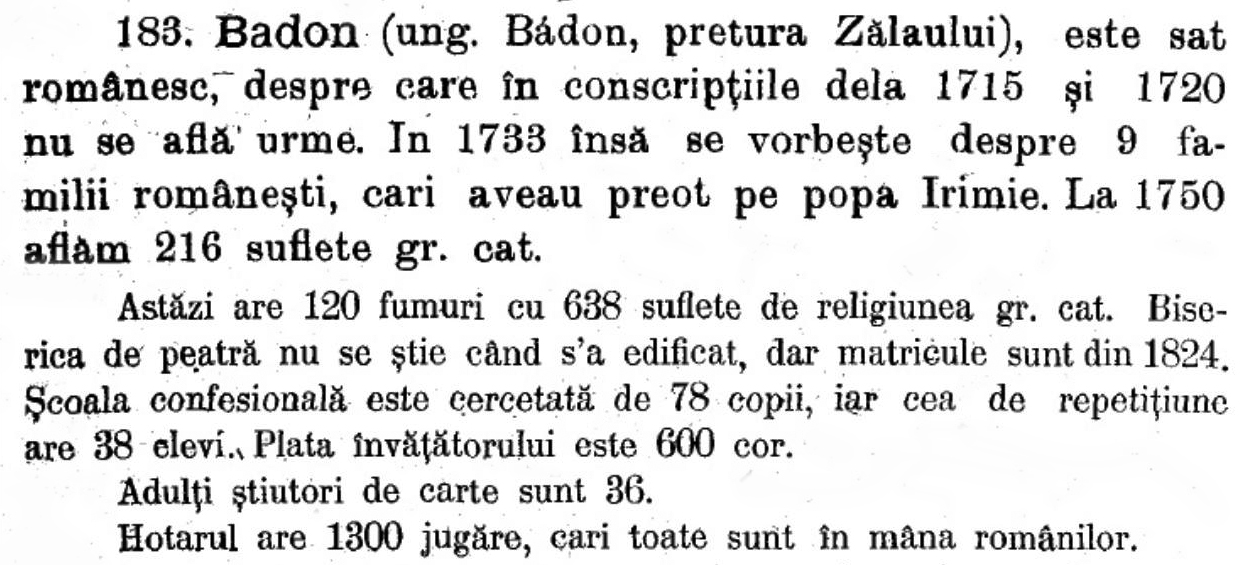
Bádon

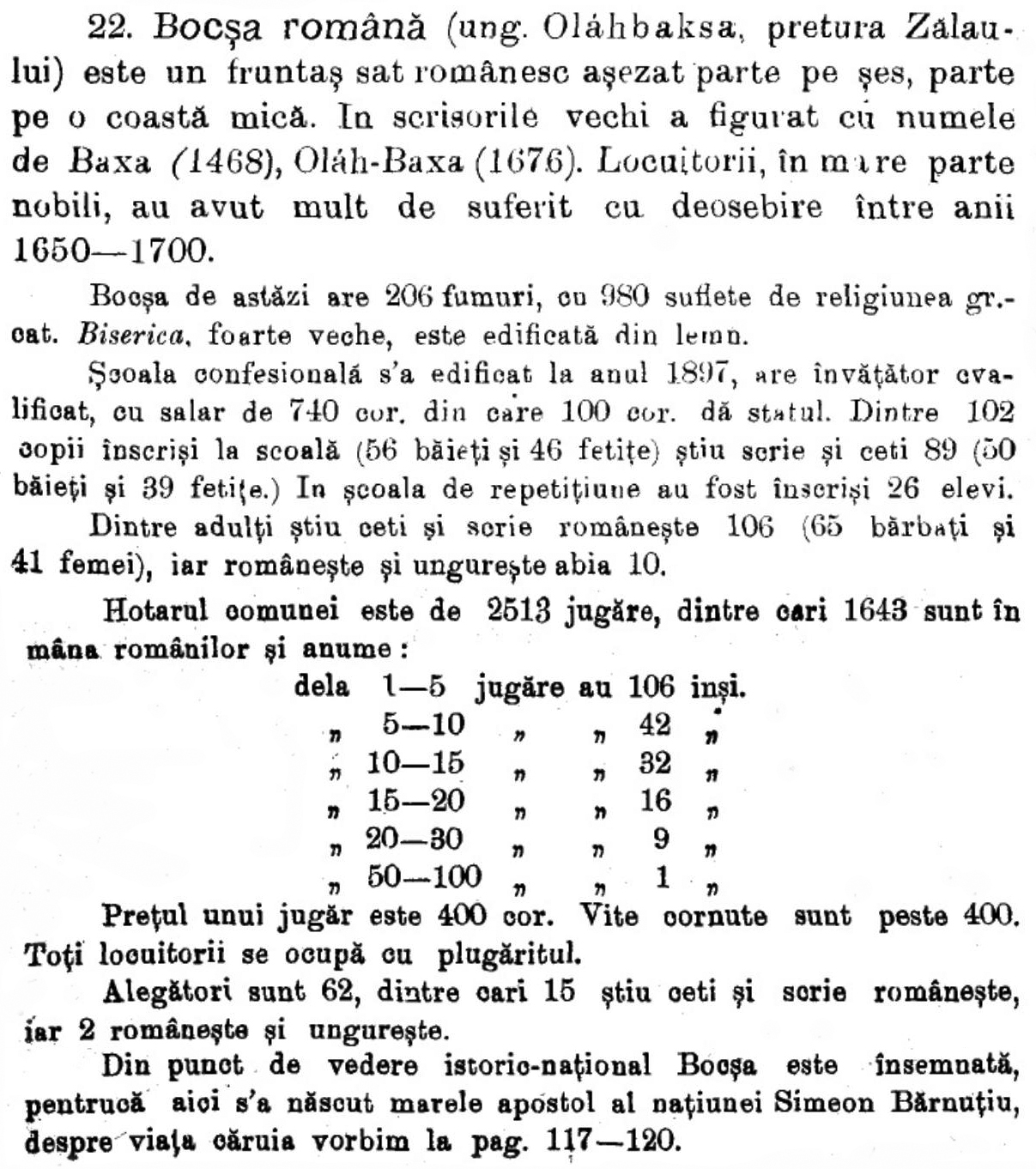
Bocşa

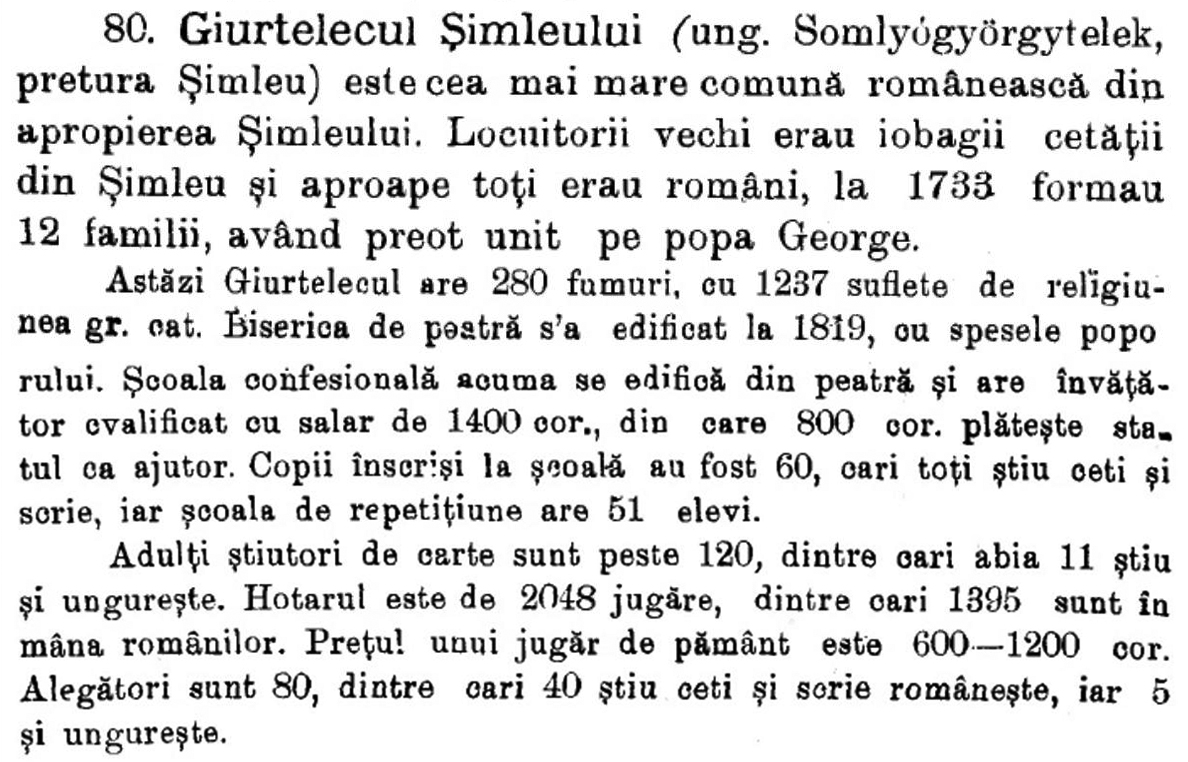
Giurtelecu Şimleului

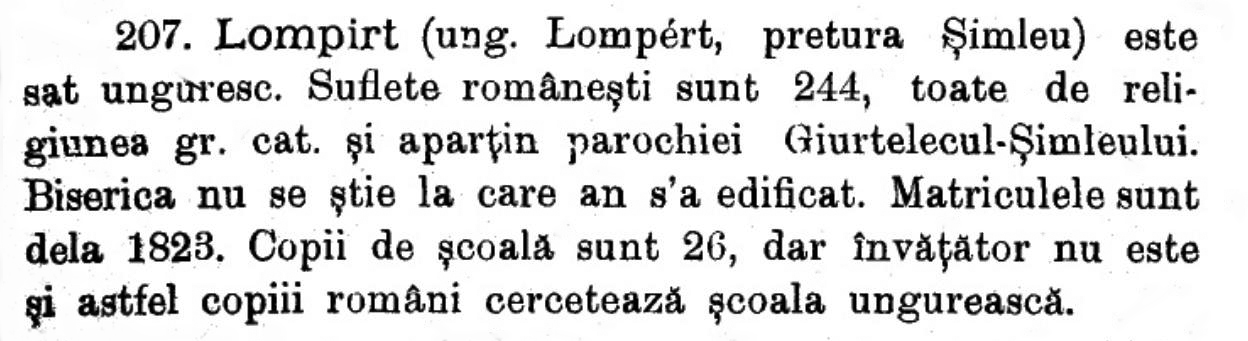
Lompirt

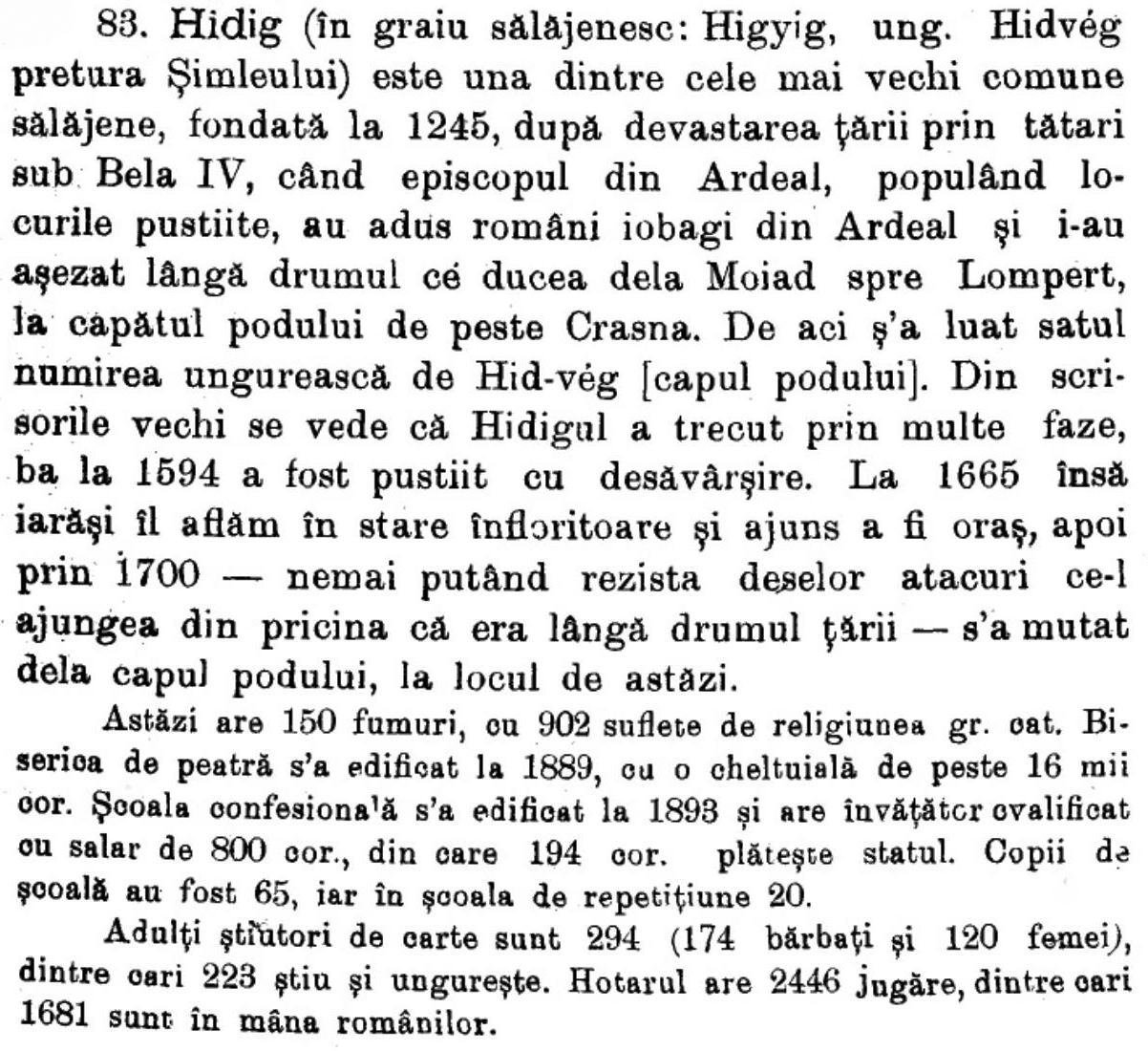
Măeriște

== See also ==
- Sălaj County monograph
