= Alexander Ratiu =

20th and 21st-century Romanian Greek-Catholic priest

Father Alexander Ratiu
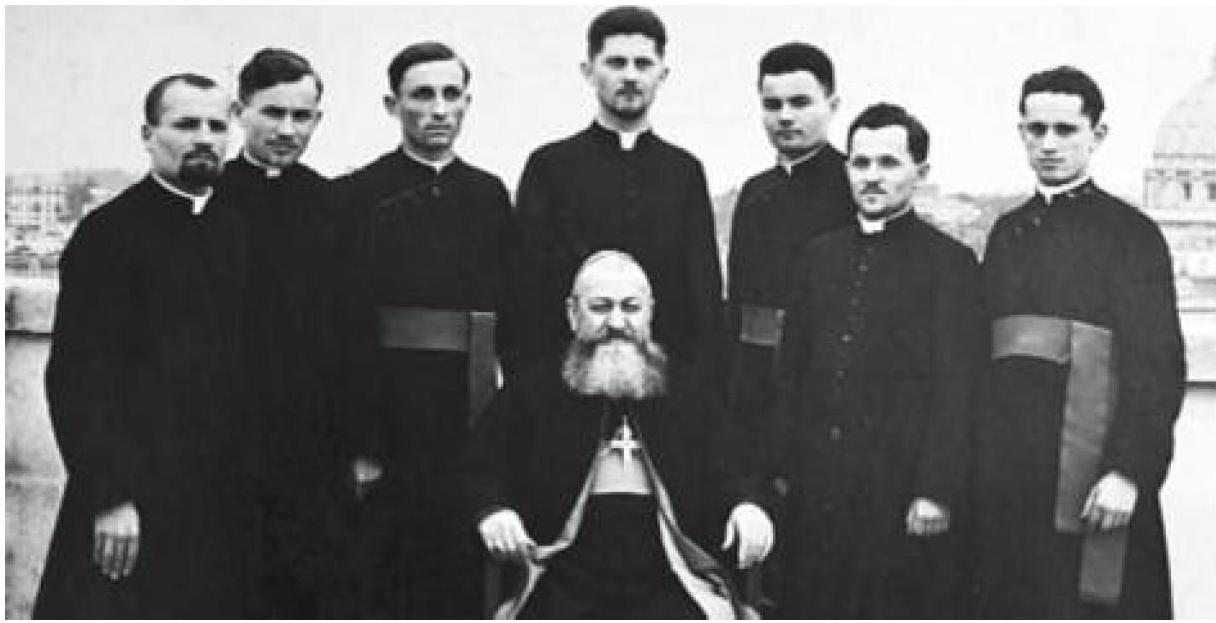
- Alexander Ratiu is the 5th person from the left in the back row. Bishop Valeriu Traian Frențiu (1872–1952) is sitting.

Personal details
- Born: May 4, 1916 Scalp Level, Pennsylvania, U.S.
- Died: July 25, 2002 (aged 86) Aurora, Illinois, U.S.
- Denomination: Romanian Greek Catholic Church
- Residence: Giurtelecu Şimleului, Aurora, Illinois
- Parents: Elisabeta Chindriș and Grigore Rațiu
- Occupation: Priest and author
- Education: Doctorate
- Alma mater: Pio Romano Seminary and Pontifical Urbaniana University

Father Alexander Ratiu (Romanian: Rațiu; 4 May 1916 – 25 July 2002) was a Romanian-American priest of the Romanian Greek-Catholic Church. While serving in his family's country of origin, he became a political prisoner, and later, after his release, an author.

Ratiu served as a pastor in both Giurtelecu Șimleului, Romania, and in Plainfield, Illinois, in the United States.

== Early life ==
Ratiu was born on 4 May 1916, in Scalp Level, Pennsylvania, in the United States, one of the four sons of Elisabeta Chindriș and Grigore Rațiu, immigrants from Romania. His brothers were named Grigore, Ioan and Emilian. In 1921, his family moved back to Romania where he was raised in Moftinu Mic, Sălaj County (now Satu Mare County). In Carei, Ratiu attended "Vasile Lucaciu" State High School. Then he studied philosophy at Oradea, where he was a schoolmate with Coriolan Tămâian, who later became a noted prelate of the diocese. Following his university studies, in preparation for the priesthood, he studied theology at the seminary in Blaj.

Ratiu then went to Rome, where he attended the Pio Romano Seminary and the Pontifical Urbaniana University, where he received a doctorate in theology. Ratiu was a classmate for seven years with Virgil Maxim (1923–1997), who was also a noted prisoner of the Romanian communist government for his religious beliefs.

== Ministry in Romania ==
Ratiu was ordained a priest of the Romanian Greek-Catholic Church in Rome on 20 July 1941, by Bishop Alexander Evreinov, for the Greek Catholic Diocese of Oradea Mare in the region of Transylvania in Romania.

Ratiu worked as a volunteer for the National Peasants' Party, for which, in 1946, he worked to organize the country's general election. In May 1947, he served as a priest in Giurtelecu Șimleului. Between May 1947 and July 1948, Ratiu was arrested and imprisoned for his political activity against the Romanian Communist Party.

After his release, Ratiu taught at the Greek-Catholic seminary in Oradea. A few months later, in October 1948, the Romanian government dissolved the Greek-Catholic Church in the country, declaring that the will of the people was to join the Romanian Orthodox Church. They seized all its churches and institutions and gave them to the Orthodox Church. The government then arrested the six bishops of the Church, along with many priests and lay leaders, and attempted to convince them to declare publicly their allegiance to the Orthodox Church. Refusal led to torture and often death. Ratiu refused, however, to renounce his faith.

== Political prisoner ==
"In prison one either goes mad or becomes a saint."

Alexander Rațiu

Consequently, Ratiu was arrested again on 19 October 1948, by the Communist government and remained imprisoned for the next sixteen years, of which eighteen months were passed in solitary confinement at the Sighet Prison. Between 1948 and 1964, Rațiu was imprisoned at a succession of prisons: Căldărușani, Sighet (May 1950 – July 1955), Gherla (1955–1959), Jilava, Bătești, followed by being sent to labor camps at Strâmba, Stoienești, and Great Brăila Island. Ratiu was subsequently placed under house arrest for another two years (1962–1964), during which time he was confined in Lățești, Ialomița County.

== Return to the United States ==
In 1964, Gheorghe Gheorghiu-Dej, the Secretary General of the Romanian Communist Party, declared a general amnesty for political prisoners, which set Ratiu free. The Communist authorities allowed him to leave Romania in 1970, and he returned to the United States in 1971, staying with his brother Grigore and his family. Rațiu met with Pope John Paul II in Rome and presented the situation of Greek-Catholic Church in Romania. He served in the Roman Catholic Diocese of Joliet in Illinois from 1974 until his retirement. Ratiu was an assistant priest at St. Mary Immaculate Church in Plainfield, Illinois (1975–1982).

Rațiu became a member of the Cardinal József Mindszenty Foundation in 1977, and for 25 years served on the Board of Directors, participating in the foundation's conferences in St. Louis, Kankakee, and Chicago, where he gave many talks. An abridged edition of his book, Stolen Church, was a Christmas gift by the Foundation to its members.

Ratiu was generous in his friendship and financial support for countless persons in Romania seeking to emigrate to the United States. He helped establish a Romanian Greek-Catholic Mission of Saints Peter and Paul in Chicago in December 1994. Ratiu spoke eight languages fluently, and this aptitude for languages led him to learn Spanish to celebrate Mass for Mexican migrant workers.

In 1996, following the collapse of Communist rule in Romania, Rațiu returned for a visit to witness the rebirth of the Greek Catholic Church. He preached to large crowds of the faithful as parishes reopened, and attended the consecration of several new bishops for the Byzantine Rite.

== Awards ==
In 1983, the Polish Freedom Fighters bestowed upon Alexander Ratiu the Solidarity Freedom Award.

== Death ==
Rațiu died on 25 July 2002, at his home in Plainfield, Illinois, at the age of 86. On his deathbed Rațiu said, "Spiritual freedom gives us courage, the courage to preach. So I preached freely and defended the faith when the persecution began, and I rejoiced when I was arrested." His funeral took place at the Romanian Greek Catholic Church "Sf. Gheorghe", in Aurora, Illinois, on the morning of 27 July 2002. Ratiu was interred in Plainfield, Illinois.

== Legacy ==
Alexander Rațiu remarked that prison had an unexpected effect on priests and other believers, as well as former atheists: "In prison one either goes mad or becomes a saint." For many who suffered imprisonment, it was the first time in their lives that they were led to pray and to look for God's support:

We were never so happy. We never felt the presence of God so intimately; and we never prayed more seriously, confidently, and successfully than in those prison barracks.

== Works ==
- Alexander Ratiu and William Virtue, Stolen Church: Martyrdom in Communist Romania (Huntington, Indiana: Our Sunday Visitor, Inc., 1979).
- Alexandru Rațiu, Biserica Furată (Cluj-Napoca: Ed. Argus, 1990).
- Alexandru Rațiu, Persecuția Bisericii Române Unite [The Persecution of the Romanian Greek-Catholic Church] (Oradea: Imprimeria de Vest Publishing House, 1994).
- Alexandru Rațiu, Memoria închisorii Sighet, Editor Romulus Rusan (București, Ed. Fundației Academia Civică, 1999). ISBN 978-973-98437-5-1.

== See also ==
- Anti-communism
- Cold War
- Criticisms of communism
- Criticisms of Communist party rule
- History of communism
- Re-education in Communist Romania

== External sources ==
- Who's who in Romanian America: Serban C. Andronescu, Compiler; American Institute for Writing Research Corp., Editor; By Șerban Andronescu, American Institute for Writing Research, American Institute for Writing Research, Published by Andronescu-Wyndill, 1976, 188 pages
- Radu Ciuceanu — Regimul penitenciar din România 1940–1962, Institutul Naţional pentru Studiul Totalitarismului, București, 2001.
- Max Bănuș — Cei care m-au ucis, Ed. Tinerama, București, 1991 (Stoeneşti, Salcia).
- Alexandru Mihalcea — Jurnal de ocnă, Ed. Albatros, 1994 (Salcia, Luciu-Giurgeni, Grădina, Stoeneşti).
- Ion Ioanid — Închisoarea noastră cea de toate zilele, vol. I-V, Ed. Albatros, București, 1991–1996 (Salcia, Stoenești).
- Doru Novacovici — În România după gratii, Fundaţia pentru tineret Buzău, f.a. (Luciu-Giurgeni, Grădina, Stoenești).
- Aurel Maxim — Amintiri din temnițele comuniste, Ed. Hermann Sibiu, 1996 (Luciu-Giurgeni, Strâmba).
