= Maniu =

Maniu is a Romanian surname. Notable people with the surname include:

- Adrian Maniu (1891–1968), Romanian poet, prose writer, playwright, essayist, and translator
- Clara Maniu (1842–1929), Romanian feminist and suffragist
- Ioan Maniu (1833–1895), Transylvanian Romanian lawyer, politician, and journalist
- Iuliu Maniu (1873–1953), Austro-Hungarian-born lawyer and Romanian politician
