= Laurențiu Man =

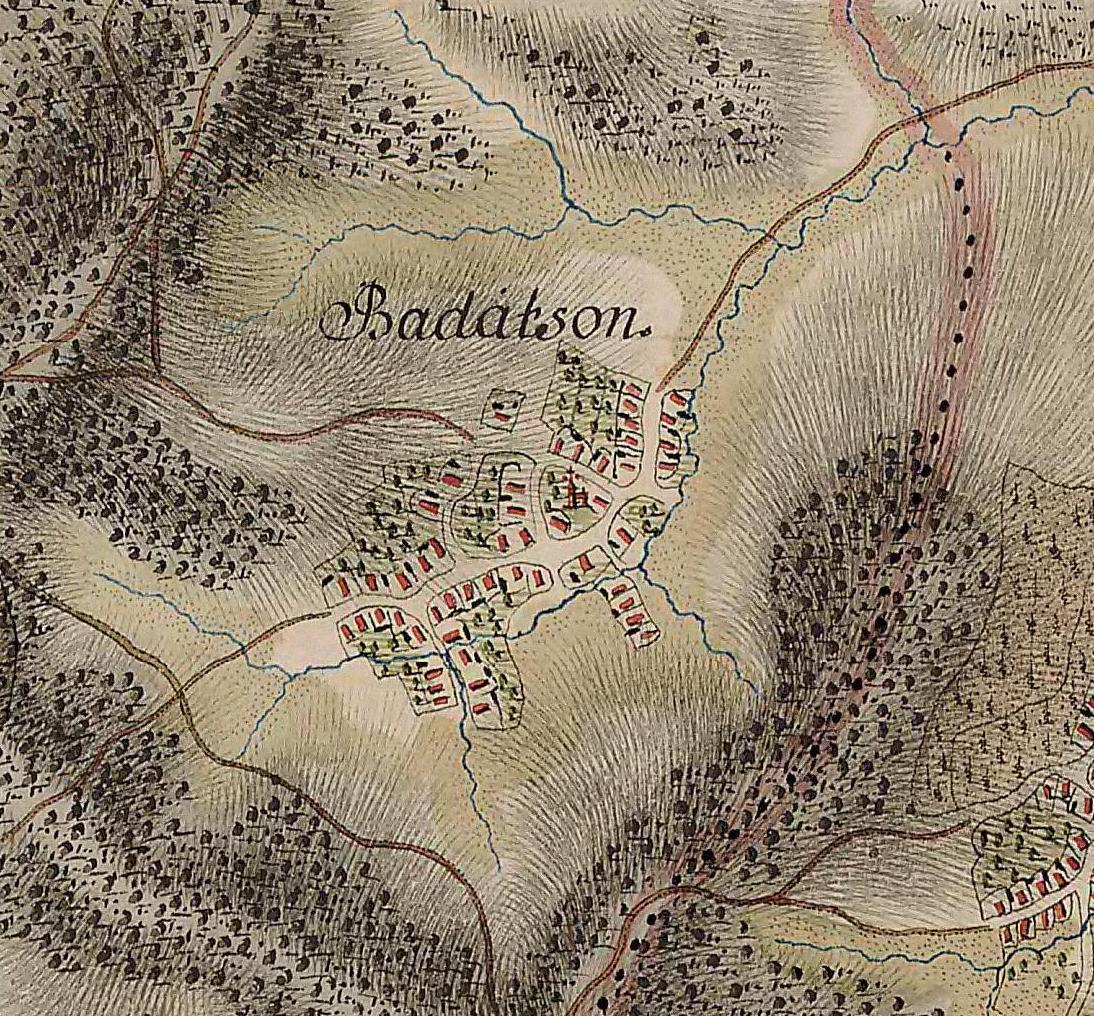
An 18th century map of Badatson, where Man Noble's house was located

Laurențiu Man was a Hungarian noble of Romanian origin who was in the service of Leopold I, Holy Roman Emperor.

Laurențiu Man entered the service of the Habsburgs who gradually imposed their rule on the Principality of Transylvania and the Varat Eyalet in the late 17th century. As a reward for his loyalty to the Habsburgs, Laurențiu Man was ennobled by the Emperor Leopold I on December 7, 1699 in Vienna. The diploma was signed by Emperor Leopold I, the Chancellor of Transylvania, Sámuel Kálnoky, and Andreas Szentkereszty (1662–1736). The Diploma of ennoblement was composed, written, and read by Matte Benignissime. Man Noble's house was located in Badatson, just 5 km (3.1 mi) outside the capital of Krasna County, Szilágysomlyó. In addition to the aristocratic title of nobility for himself and his descendants, Laurențiu Man was also granted tax exemption for himself and his descendants in perpetuity. Laurențiu Man had one son Ilie (married to Nagy Viràgsi) and three grandsons: loan, Mihail, and Petru. Ioan Maniu (1833–1895) was one of his descendants.

== Bibliography ==
- Petri Mór: Szilágy vármegye monographiája III.: Szilágy vármegye községeinek története (A-K). [Budapest]: Szilágy vármegye közönsége. 1902. 41–47. o.
- Dionisie Stoica, Ioan P. Lazăr, "Schița monografică a Sălagiului", Șimleu Silvaniei, 1908.
