= Giurtelecu =

Giurtelecu or Giurtelec may refer to:

- Giurtelecu Şimleului, a village in Măeriște commune
- Giurtelecu Hododului, a village in Hodod commune

== See also ==
- Győrtelek, a village in Hungary
