= Ardelean =

- Language: Romanian

Origin
- Region of origin: Romania

Other names
- See also: Ardeleanu

Ardelean is a Romanian surname. Notable people with the name include:

- Laurențiu Ardelean (born 2001), Romanian footballer
- Virgil Ardelean (born 1950), Romanian police chief

== See also ==
- Bicazu Ardelean, a commune in Neamţ County, Romania
- Ardeleanu
