= Szilágy County monograph =

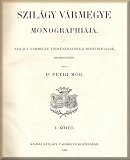
- Author: Petri Mór
- Original title: Szilágy vármegye monográfiája
- Publication date: 1901-1904
- Publication place: Hungary

Szilágy County monograph (Hungarian: Szilágy vármegye monográfiája) is a book edited by Petri Mór.

All six volumes of the book were published in Budapest from 1901 to 1904. The monograph covers the main features of the history of Szilágy County.

== See also ==
- Monographic sketch of Sălaj County
