= Malade =

Malade may refer to:

- Mălădia [ro] (Hungarian Maladé), a village in Măeriște, Romania
- "Malade", a single by pop music band Rational Youth

== See also ==
- Malad
