= Wooden Church, Criștelec =

Church in Criștelec, Romania

- Biserica de lemn din Criștelec
- Romania

Religion
- Affiliation: Catholic
- Region: Sălaj County
- Ecclesiastical or organizational status: parish church
- Year consecrated: 1785

Location
- Location: Criștelec
- State: Romania
- Interactive map of Wooden Church, Criștelec
- Coordinates: 47.26417°N 22.72278°E

The Wooden Church (Romanian: Biserica de lemn din Criștelec) was a church in Criștelec, Romania, built in 1785 and demolished in 1955.

== Bibliography ==
- Leontin Ghergariu (14 August 1976). "Biserici de lemn din Sălaj". manuscris în Arhivele Naționale din Zalău, colecția personală Leontin Ghergariu (actul 11 din 1976).
