= Reformed Church, Uileacu Șimleului =

Church in Sălaj County, Romania

Coordinates: 47°16′45.32″N 22°45′12.33″E

Reformed Church
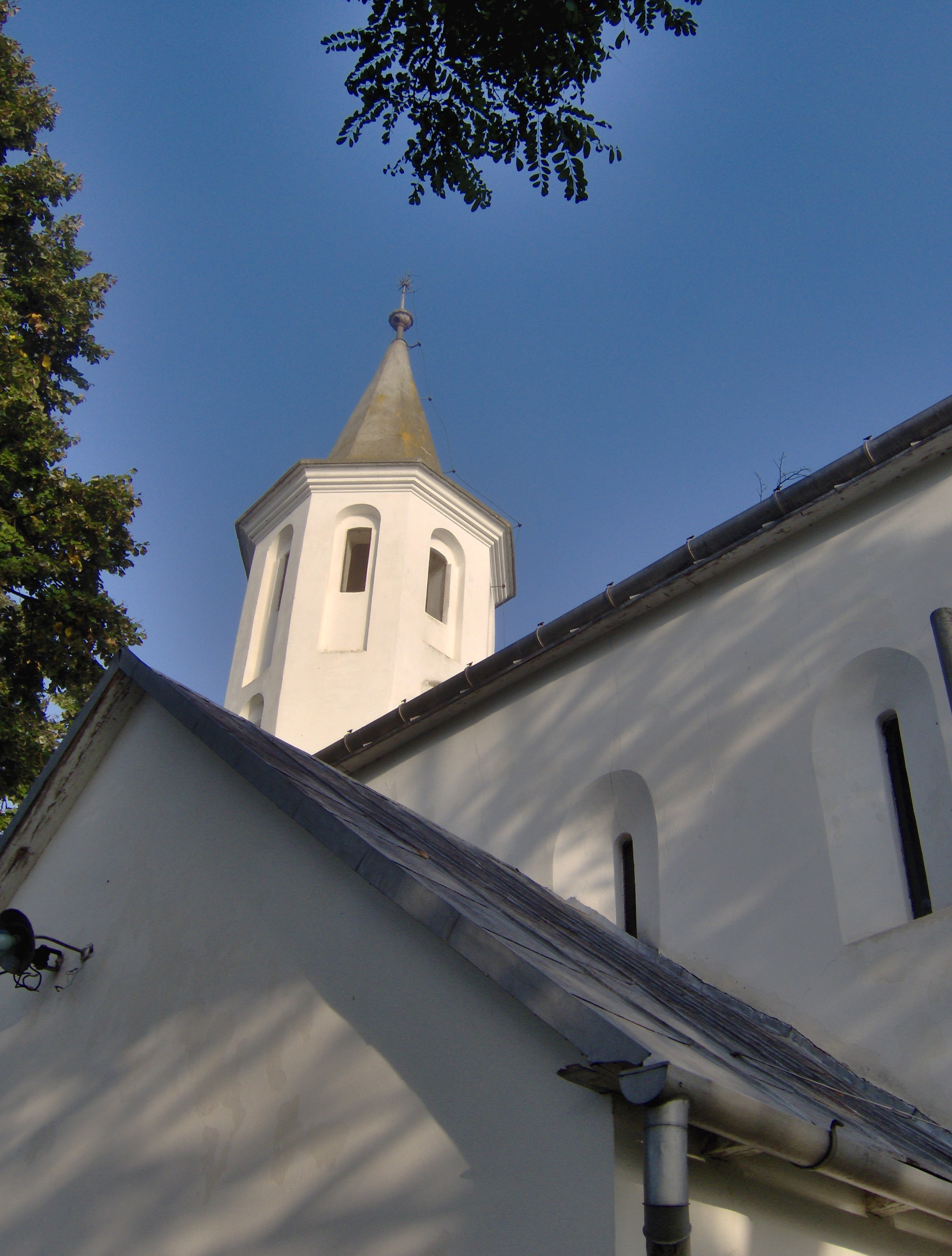

Religion
- Year consecrated: 1300

Location
- Municipality: Uileacu Şimleului
- Interactive map of Reformed Church

The Reformed Church (Romanian: Biserica Reformată; Hungarian: Református templom) is a church in Uileacu Șimleului, Sălaj County, Romania, built between 1260 and 1300.

== Gallery ==
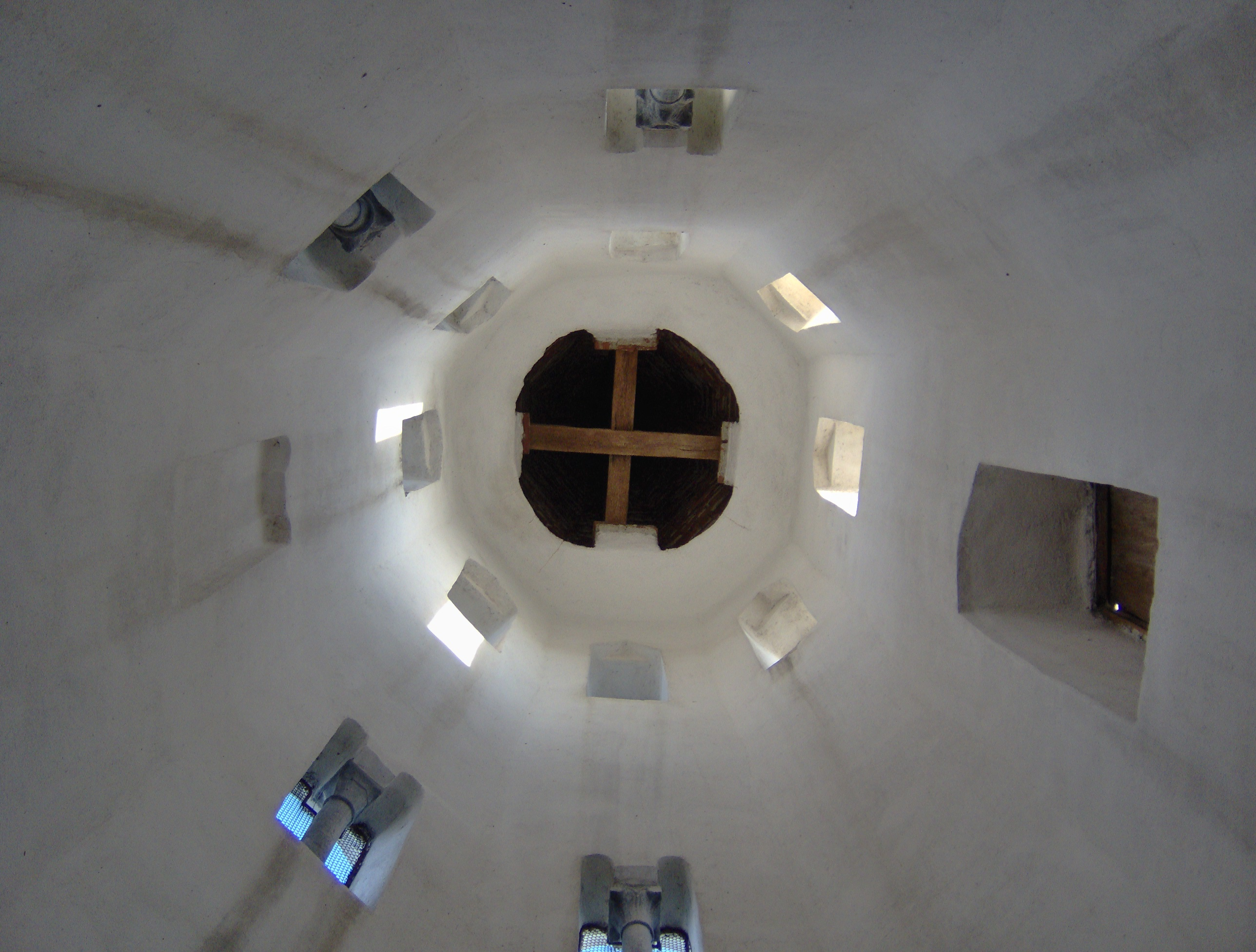

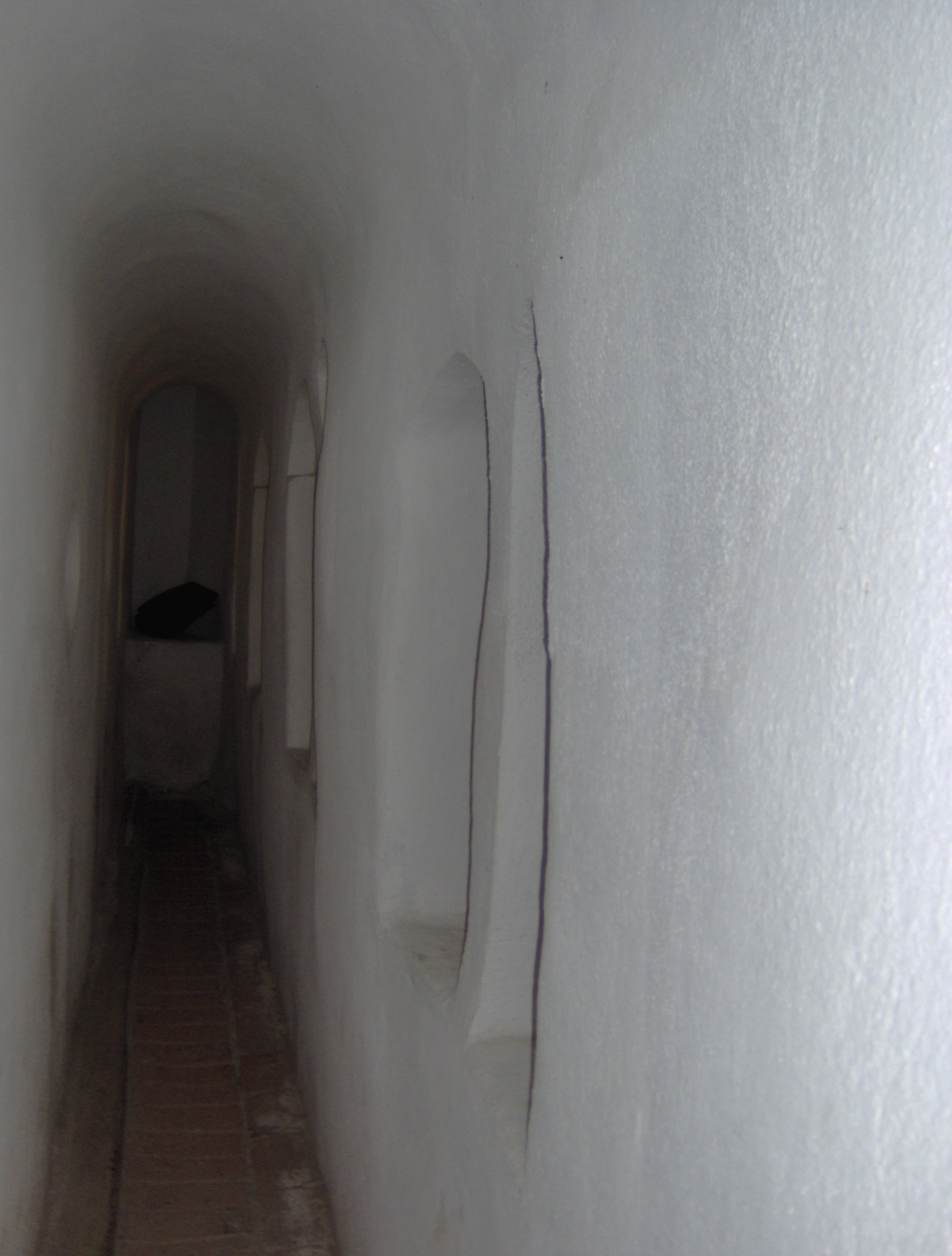

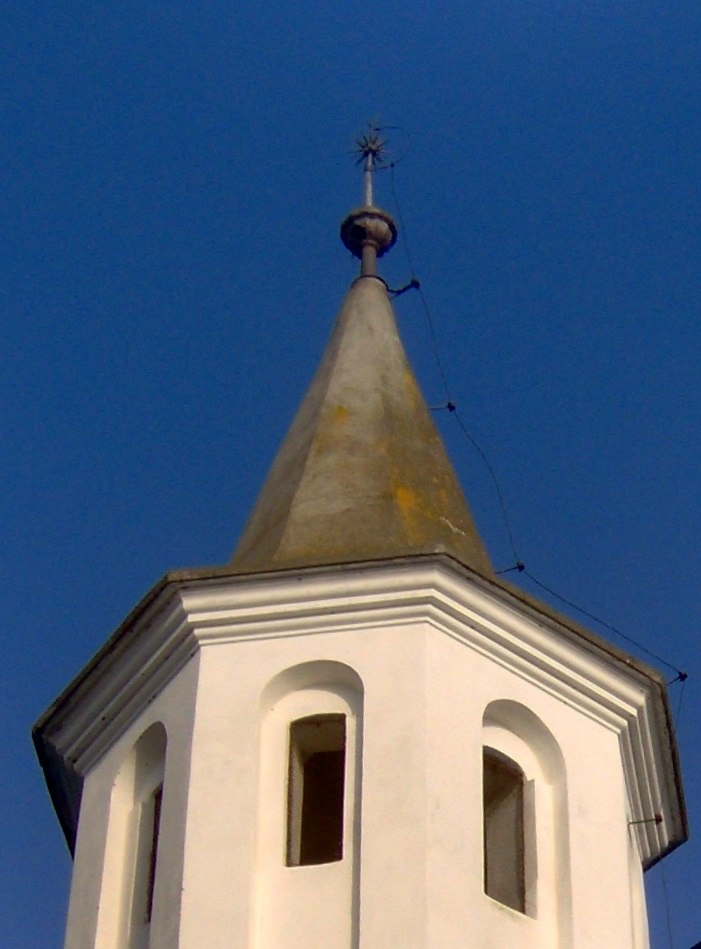

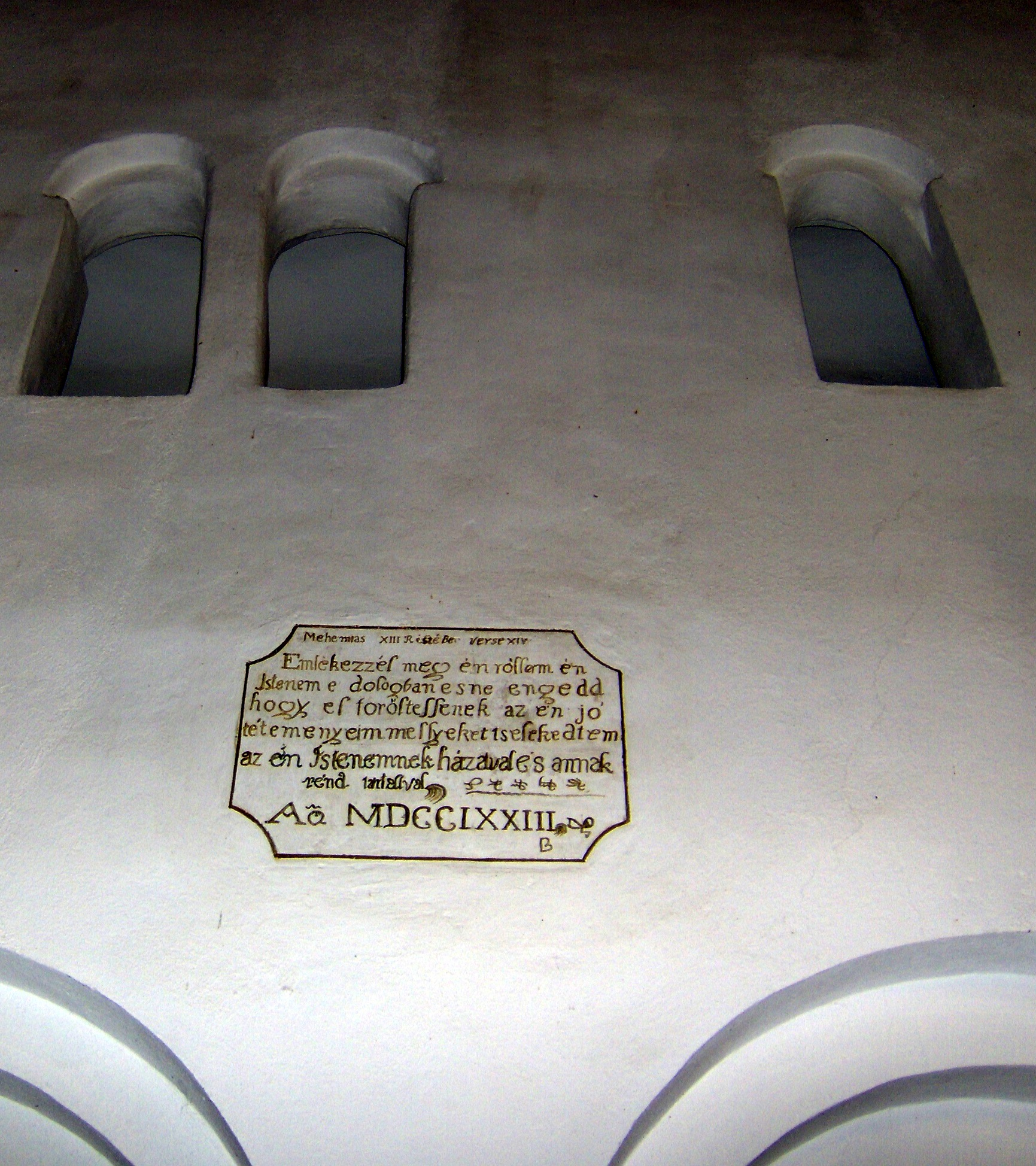

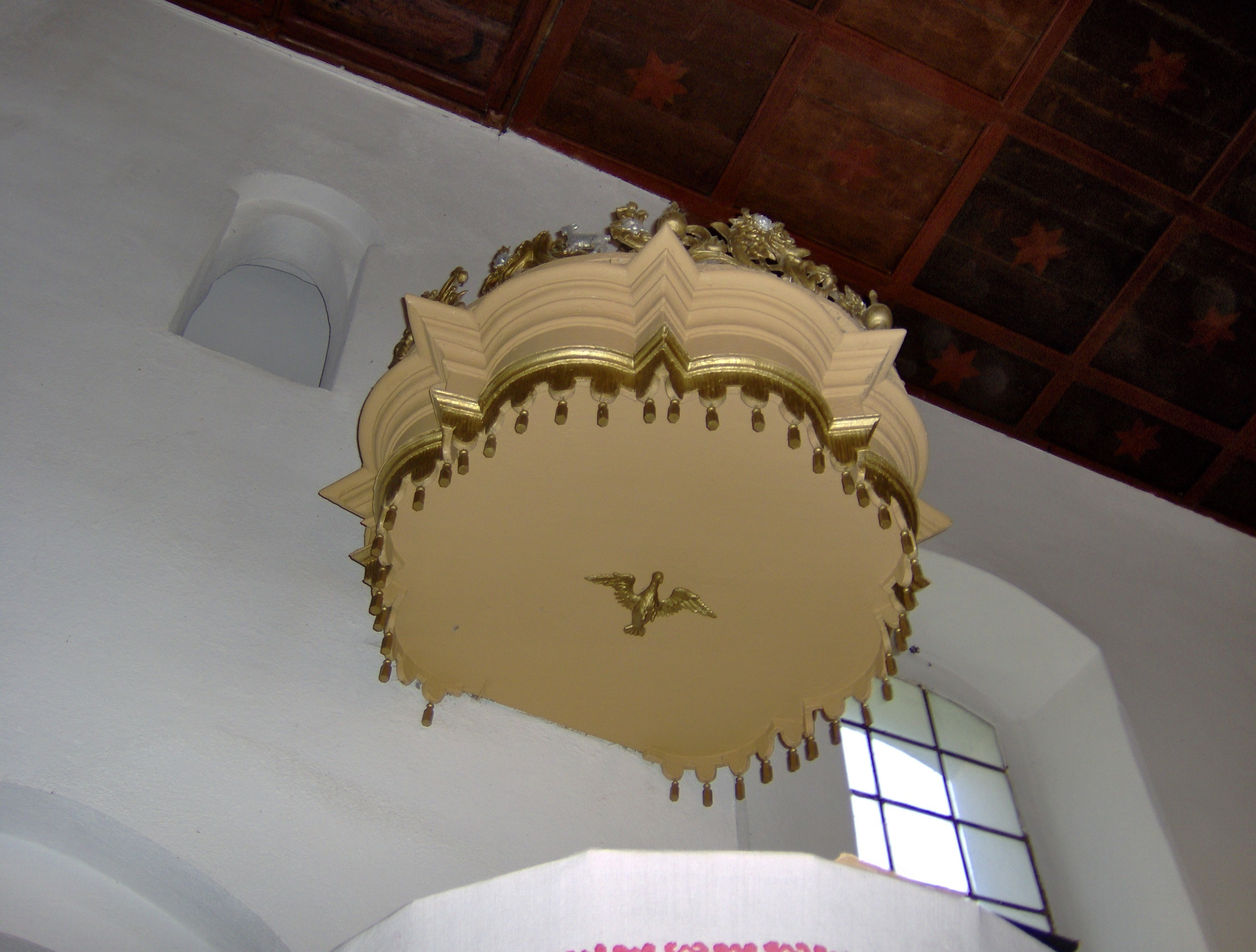
