= Old church, Bădăcin =

Church in Bǎdǎcin, Romania

Old church, Bădăcin _{Biserica veche, Bădăcin}
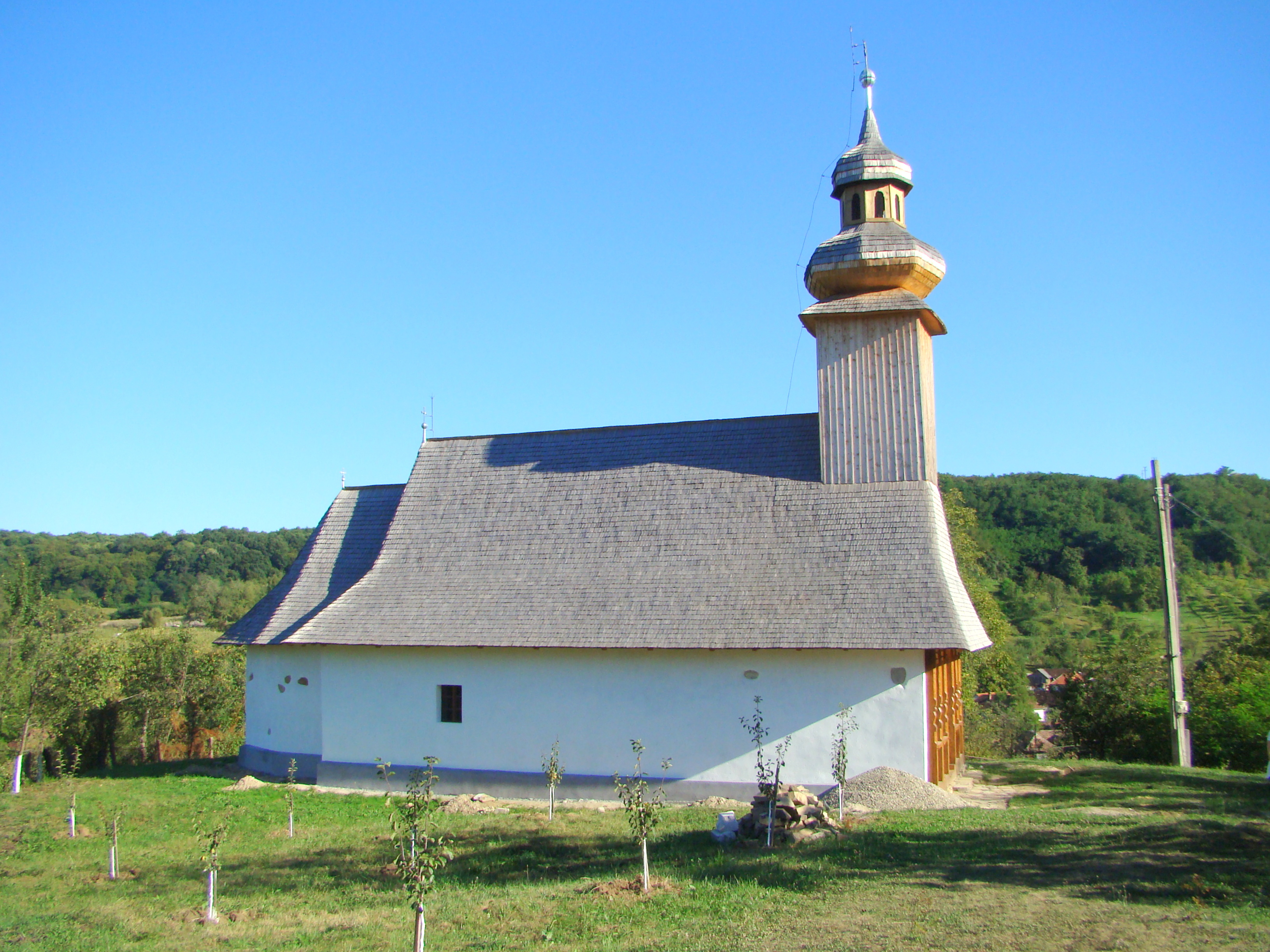

- Romania

Religion
- Affiliation: Eastern Orthodox Church
- Region: Sălaj County
- Ecclesiastical or organisational status: parish church
- Year consecrated: 1705

Location
- Location: Bădăcin
- Municipality: Bădăcin
- State: Romania
- Coordinates: 47.25690°N 22.85287°E

The Old Church (Romanian: Biserica veche, Bădăcin) is a church in Bădăcin, Romania, built in 1705.
