= Clara Maniu =

Romanian feminist and suffragist

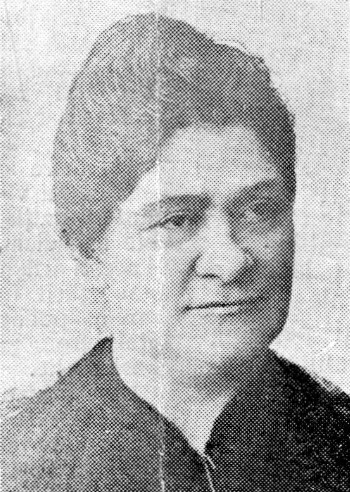
- Born: Clara Coroianu; 10 January 1842; Nagyderzsida, Kingdom of Hungary
- Died: 29 July 1929 (aged 87); Bădăcin, Sălaj County, Kingdom of Romania
- Occupation: Suffragist
- Spouse: Ioan Maniu (m. 1865)
- Children: Cassiu, Iuliu, Sabina, Cornelia, and Elena
- Parents: Demetriu Coroianu (father); Iuliana Pop (mother)

Clara Maniu (born Clara Coroianu; 10 January 1842 – 29 July 1929) was a Romanian feminist and suffragist. She was the president of the Romanian women's movement organisation Reuniunea Femeilor Române Sălăjene (R.F.R.S) from 1881 to 1897.

She was born in 1842 in Nagyderzsida, Kingdom of Hungary (now Bobota, in Sălaj County, Romania). Her father, Demetriu Coroianu, was a Greek-Catholic priest, while her mother, Iuliana Pop, was the granddaughter of protopope Grigorie Pop from Craidorolț.

She married Ioan Maniu in 1865, and among their five children was Iuliu Maniu. She died in 1929 in Bădăcin, a village in Pericei commune, Sălaj County.
