= Ardeleanu =

- Language: Romanian

Origin
- Region of origin: Romania

Other names
- See also: Ardelean

Ardeleanu is Romanian surname. It may refer to the following people:

- Carol Ardeleanu, Romanian writer
- Iosif Ardeleanu, Austro-Hungarian-born Romanian communist activist
- Ștefan Ardeleanu, Romanian fencer
- Suzana Ardeleanu, Romanian fencer
- Vasile Ardeleanu, Romanian footballer

== See also ==
- Ardelean
