= Ioan Maniu =

Transylvanian Romanian lawyer, politician and journalist

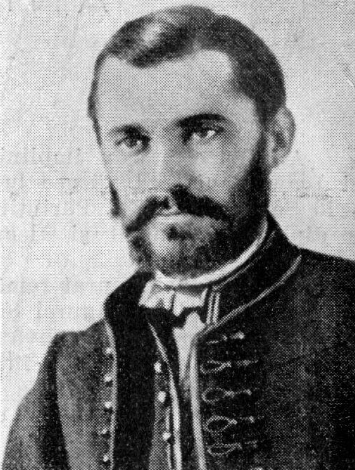
- Born: Ioan Maniu; 10 September 1833; Szilágybadacsony, Kingdom of Hungary (now Bădăcin, Sălaj County, Romania)
- Died: 4 November 1895 (aged 62); Szilágybadacsony, Kingdom of Hungary
- Education: Pest and Vienna
- Title: lawyer
- Spouse: Clara Maniu
- Children: Cassiu, Iuliu, Sabina, Cornelia, and Elena

Ioan Maniu (Romanian pronunciation: [iˈo̯an maˈni.u]; 10 September 1833 – 4 November 1895) was a Transylvanian Romanian lawyer, politician and journalist.

== Biography ==
Maniu was born in 1833 in Szilágybadacsony, Kingdom of Hungary, now the village of Bădăcin, in Pericei commune, Sălaj County, Romania. He studied law in Pest and Vienna. Maniu was deeply influenced by his uncle, Simion Bărnuțiu.

At the age of 6, in 1839, he started to study at Șimleu Silvaniei, the courses for the Franciscan Minorites gymnasium, where he graduated from the elementary school and 4 lower secondary classes. He spent 8 years under the strict discipline of the monks. In this place he met the vicar Alexandru Sterca-Șuluțiu and the Romanian language teacher Andrei Liviu Pop, who would later influence his life.

In the fall of 1849, he went to the Romanian schools in Blaj, where he was enrolled in the fifth grade. As a student in Blaj, Maniu lived very hard, with the "scream" (the Metropolis had shared free bread to the poor students) and also, they were given the poor "zeama" (the chicken soup) for free from the kitchen of the Theological Seminary, where on a daily basis the cooks made the soup for the poor students.

In 1850 he came home on Easter holiday, but due to shortages, he had to quit school. He remained here until his former teacher, Andrei Liviu Pop, intervened, telling his mother Ileana that it would be a shame for the boy to stay home, a peasant, seeing his excellent grades. From the annual reports of the high school it was observed that, in grades VI-VIII (there were missing those of the fifth grade), but the student Maniu was among the first, related to the marks and behavior. Starting with the 7th grade, uncle Bărnuțiu was able to send some modest help. One of his very good colleagues and friends was Ioan Micu Moldovan, who remained to the death his friend and the counselor of the family, passing the old friendship especially on Iuliu Maniu, who, at his proposal, was appointed the lawyer of the Metropolitan Church of Blaj.

He married in 1865 Clara Coroian, the daughter of the Greek-Catholic clergyman Demetriu Coroian. They had five children: Cassiu, Iuliu, Sabina, Cornelia, and Elena. Their second child, Iuliu Maniu, was a politician. He died in 1895 in his native village of Bădăcin.

== Family ==
He was born on 10 September 1833 in a Romanian family (Greek-Catholic), being the son of Teodor Man and Ilena Bărnuțiu, the sister of the revolutionary Simion Bărnuțiu. Teodor Man was a peasant-nobleman from Badacin, one of the descendants of Laurențiu Man. In a letter to his uncle, Simion Bărnuțiu, of 10 March 1861, Ioan Maniu, had made his self-description, in which he said that he is tall, "only that I am thin and not fat like my father". Teodor Man died in his prime due to pneumonia, which he contracted while working on the construction of his own house. Ioan Maniu was only 2 years old when his father died.

Ileana Bărnuțiu was the daughter of teacher and singer Ioan Bărnuțiu, married to Ana Oros from Bocșa. Ioan Barnutiu was the son of the united Roman priest Simion Bărnuțiu from Bocșa, the latter was also a son of a priest, and his father was also called Simion Bărnuțiu. In the letter that Ioan Maniu addressed to his uncle, Simion Bărnuțiu, on 30 October 1855, he wrote: "You are the replica of your mother, the only thing that the Mother’s face was drier and paler than yours." In another letter Ioan Maniu also said to his uncle: “I have another growth by the years of 16th, I had nothing but my mother who gave her sweet words. Another example of virtue I had was only her gentle behavior, her noble heart, which all man marveled at." Ileana Bărnuțiu died in 1854–1855. Teodor Man and Ilena Bărnuțiu had three children: Ioan, Sofia (married to Teodor Man, economist form Bădăcin), and Ștefan.
