= Virgil Ardelean =

Romanian police chief

Virgil Ardelean (born August 1, 1950) is a Romanian police chief, head of Direcţia Generală de Informaţii şi Protecţie Internă (DGIPI) between 1998 and 2007.

== Biography ==
Ardelean was born in Pericei, Sălaj County. The village is populated by ethnic Hungarians and Roma; his mother had the Hungarian surname of Gábor, and Ardelean made efforts to conceal his background from the nationalist Communist regime of Nicolae Ceauşescu, within which he sought advancement. In 1974, he graduated from the police academy at Băneasa, in the counter-sabotage class of the economic police section. By 1989, he was deputy police chief of Cluj-Napoca, and on the day before Ceauşescu was toppled in that December's Revolution, his superior commanded him to take measures to preserve public order. Upon hearing the chief, he started shouting and said he was unable to hear the order, whereupon he was immediately sent to the hospital. There, following a telephone call from the local head of the Securitate secret police, Ardelean was diagnosed with "acute bilateral otitis" and ordered to stay in bed, thus avoiding having to choose sides in the Revolution. The following month, when the new Ion Iliescu government was in danger of being overthrown, Ardelean received a similar order, went into hysterics, was sent to the hospital, diagnosed with "temporary memory loss", and given two weeks' medical leave.

After 1989, Ardelean remained deputy chief of the Romanian Police in Cluj-Napoca, and was later promoted to chief in Bucharest. In 1998, he was named to run DGIPI, a unit within the Interior Ministry that is descended from UM 0215, an entity created to employ former cadres of the Securitate who were barred from joining Serviciul Român de Informaţii. Several controversies surrounded him during his tenure there. The first had its origins earlier, when he worked in Cluj-Napoca. In 1994, when the Caritas Ponzi scheme showed signs it was about to collapse, he ordered a search of the company's offices, reportedly seizing diskettes showing what payments were made to politicians, and using this information to facilitate his rise. (Ardelean denies the notion of concealed diskettes, stating that all evidence gathered is in the police file on the case.) During the Mineriad of January 1999, he is said to have misinformed Interior Minister Gavril Dejeu about the miners' actions and intentions, leading to victories of theirs. However, he was not prosecuted. In 2001, an assistant to Prime Minister Adrian Năstase resigned; upon doing so, he listed Ardelean's name among those he suspected of facilitating relations between businesspeople and senior government figures. In 2003, American analyst Larry Watts delivered a report, "Control and Oversight of Security Intelligence in Romania", to the Geneva Centre for the Democratic Control of Armed Forces, and cited DGIPI as the place where the most infractions took place among the country's secret services. Also that year, he ordered constant surveillance of telephones belonging to press agencies and to the National Anticorruption Prosecution Office. In 2004, two brothers alleged that Ardelean fabricated their entire criminal record after they refused to pay further bribes to his agency's employees.

Reportedly, Ardelean, nicknamed Vulpea ("The Fox"), was able to last nine years in his position because he furnished both presidents and prime ministers with compromising information about politicians, businesspeople and intelligence service employees. He resigned in July 2006, following the flight of indicted businessman Omar Hayssam, but it was not until almost a year later that his resignation was accepted. In January 2009, Ardelean briefly returned to head DGIPI when incoming Interior Minister Gabriel Oprea named him to head it, but a scandal ensued within Oprea's Social Democratic Party, members of which objected to his having made the appointment without first consulting them. In response, Oprea resigned from the ministry and from the party, with Ardelean relinquishing his position as well. Between 2007 and 2010, with the exception of the week he spent heading DGIPI in 2009, he headed the Interior Ministry's General Directorate of Management Operations. He retired in mid-2010.
