= Criticism of communism =

Criticism of communism may refer to:

- Criticism of communist states, criticism of the practical policies implemented by 20th century governments claiming to follow the ideology of Marxism–Leninism (usually known as communist states)
- Criticism of Marxism, criticism of the political ideology and principles most often identified with the word communism
- Anti-communism, opposition to communism, which may extend beyond simply criticising communism and include suppression of communist activities and rhetoric.

== See also ==
- Criticism of socialism
- Criticism of welfare
