= Petri Mór =

Hungarian academic

- Born: 11 July 1863; Tășnad, Satu Mare County, Austria-Hungary
- Died: 2 March 1945 (aged 81); Budapest, Hungary
- Occupations: Author, teacher

Petri Mór (11 July 1863 – 2 March 1945) was a teacher, school inspector, and author in Transylvania.

His masterwork is Szilágy vármegye monographiája (I-IV, Budapest, 1901–1904).

== Works ==
- Szilágy vármegye monographiája (I-VI., Budapest, 1901–1904)
- Magyar szonettek (Budapest, 1933)
- Vándor a kertajtónál (versek, Budapest, 1936)
- Naplemente fáklyalángja (versek, Budapest, 1941)
- Várballadák és modern balladák (Budapest, 1943)
- A boldogság triolettjei (versek, Budapest, 1943)

== Place names ==
- Gymnasium School "Petri Mór" Nușfalău.
