= Măeriște =

Commune in Crișana, Romania

- Commune
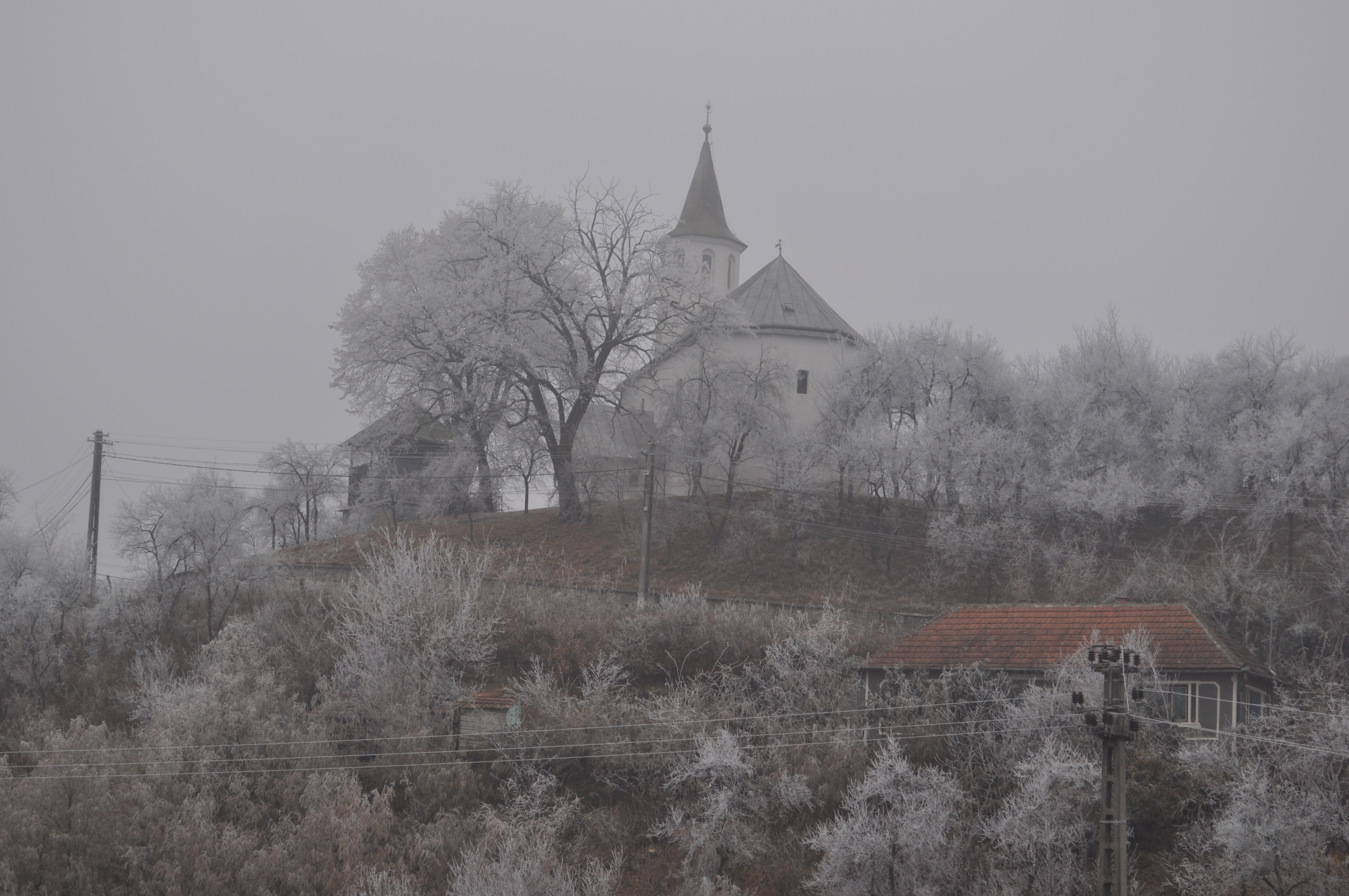
- Reformed Church, Uileacu Șimleului

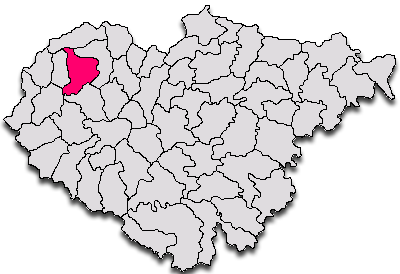
- Location in Sălaj County

- Location in Romania
- Coordinates: 47°19′31″N 22°48′37″E
- Country: Romania
- County: Sălaj
- Established: 1351 (first attested)
- Subdivisions: Criștelec, Doh, Giurtelecu Șimleului, Măeriște, Mălădia, Uileacu Șimleului

Government
  - Mayor (2020–2024): Vasile Lazăr (PNL)
- Area: 74.97 km^{2} (28.95 sq mi)
- Elevation: 180 m (590 ft)
- Population (2021-12-01): 2,681
  - Density: 35.76/km^{2} (92.62/sq mi)
- Time zone: UTC+02:00 (EET)
  - Summer (DST): UTC+03:00 (EEST)
- Postal code: 457235
- Area code: +(40) x60
- Vehicle reg.: SJ
- Website: comunamaeriste.ro

Măeriște (Hungarian: Krasznahídvég; German: Bruckend) is a commune located in Sălaj County, Crișana, Romania. It is composed of six villages: Criștelec (Kerestelek), Doh (Doh), Giurtelecu Șimleului (Somlyógyőrtelek), Măeriște, Mălădia (Maladé), and Uileacu Șimleului (Somlyóújlak).

== Geography ==
The commune, with an area of 74.97 km^{2} (28.95 sq mi), is in the north-west part of the county, in the hydrographic basin of the river Crasna. It is located 15 km (9.3 mi) north of the town of Șimleu Silvaniei and 32 km (20 mi) north-west of the county seat, Zalău. Măeriște is 21 km (13 mi) from the projected Transylvania Motorway.

== Tourism ==
Among the commune's tourist sites are the Reformed Church in Uileacu Șimleului (a former Benedictine monastery), an architectural monument dated from 1260 to 1300. The Doh church dates to 1869. The church in Mălădia was completed in 1908.

== Population ==
According to the 2002 census, the commune had a population of 3,504, of which 87.78% were Romanians, 11.24% Hungarians, 0.79% Roma, 0.11% Slovaks, and 0.08% other nationalities. At the 2011 census, there were 3,081 inhabitants; of those, 82.47% were Romanians, 10.48% Hungarians, and 2.63% Roma. At the 2021 census, Măeriște had a population of 2,681; of those, 79.86% were Romanians, 8.36% Hungarians, and 2.39% Roma.

== Economy ==
The economy of the commune is mainly agricultural, based on cereal, potato and vegetable growing. In the last few years livestock-breeding has developed.

== History ==
Măeriște was first mentioned in 1351 under the name Hydveg. The other settlements were mentioned a little earlier (Criștelec - 1257, Doh - 1338, Giurtelecu Șimleului - 1259, Mălădia - 1259 and Uileacu Șimleului - 1240).

It was a part of Kraszna County and then Szilágy County.

According to the database of Lo Tishkach European Jewish Cemeteries Initiative, there are Jewish cemeteries in Criștelec, Doh, Giurtelecu Șimleului, Măeriște, and Uileacu Șimleului.

== Politics ==
The mayor Vasile Lazăr was elected for the first time in 2004 as member of the Democratic Liberal Party and re-elected in 2008, 2012, 2016 and 2020.

=== 2012 election ===
Monica Oțelia Pușcaș resigned from the position of secretary of the town hall on March 28, 2012, to run for the mayor's seat as a candidate of the Social Liberal Union in the local election. Monica-Oțelia Pușcaș had worked for the town hall for 30 years (of which the last 18 years she had served as the secretary of the town hall).

The Măeriște Council, elected in the 2012 local government election, is made up of 13 councilors, with the following party composition: 9-Democratic Liberal Party, 3-Social Liberal Union, 1-Democratic Alliance of Hungarians in Romania.

Party	Seats	2012 Măeriște Council
Democratic Liberal Party	9	
Social Liberal Union	3	
Democratic Alliance of Hungarians in Romania	1	

=== 2008 election ===
The mayor Vasile Lazăr was elected with 70.37% in the first round of election; Alexa Avram (PNL) - 22.73%, Vasile Mitrașca (PSD) - 6.89%. The Măeriște Council, elected in the 2008 local election, was made up of 13 councilors, with the following party composition: 8-Democratic Party, 3-National Liberal Party, 1-Democratic Alliance of Hungarians in Romania, 1-Social Democratic Party.

Party	Seats	2008 Măeriște Council
Democratic Party	8	
National Liberal Party	3	
Social Democratic Party	1	
Democratic Alliance of Hungarians in Romania	1	

=== 2004 election ===
The mayor Vasile Lazăr was elected for the first time. The Măeriște Council, elected in the 2004 local election, was made up of 13 councilors, with the following party composition: 5-Democratic Party, 2-National Liberal Party, 1-Democratic Alliance of Hungarians in Romania, 2-Social Democratic Party, 2-New Generation Party – Christian Democratic and 1-Romanian Humanist Party.

Party	Seats	2004 Măeriște Council
Democratic Party	5	
National Liberal Party	2	
Social Democratic Party	2	
New Generation Party – Christian Democratic	2	
Democratic Alliance of Hungarians in Romania	1	
Romanian Humanist Party	1	

== Gallery ==
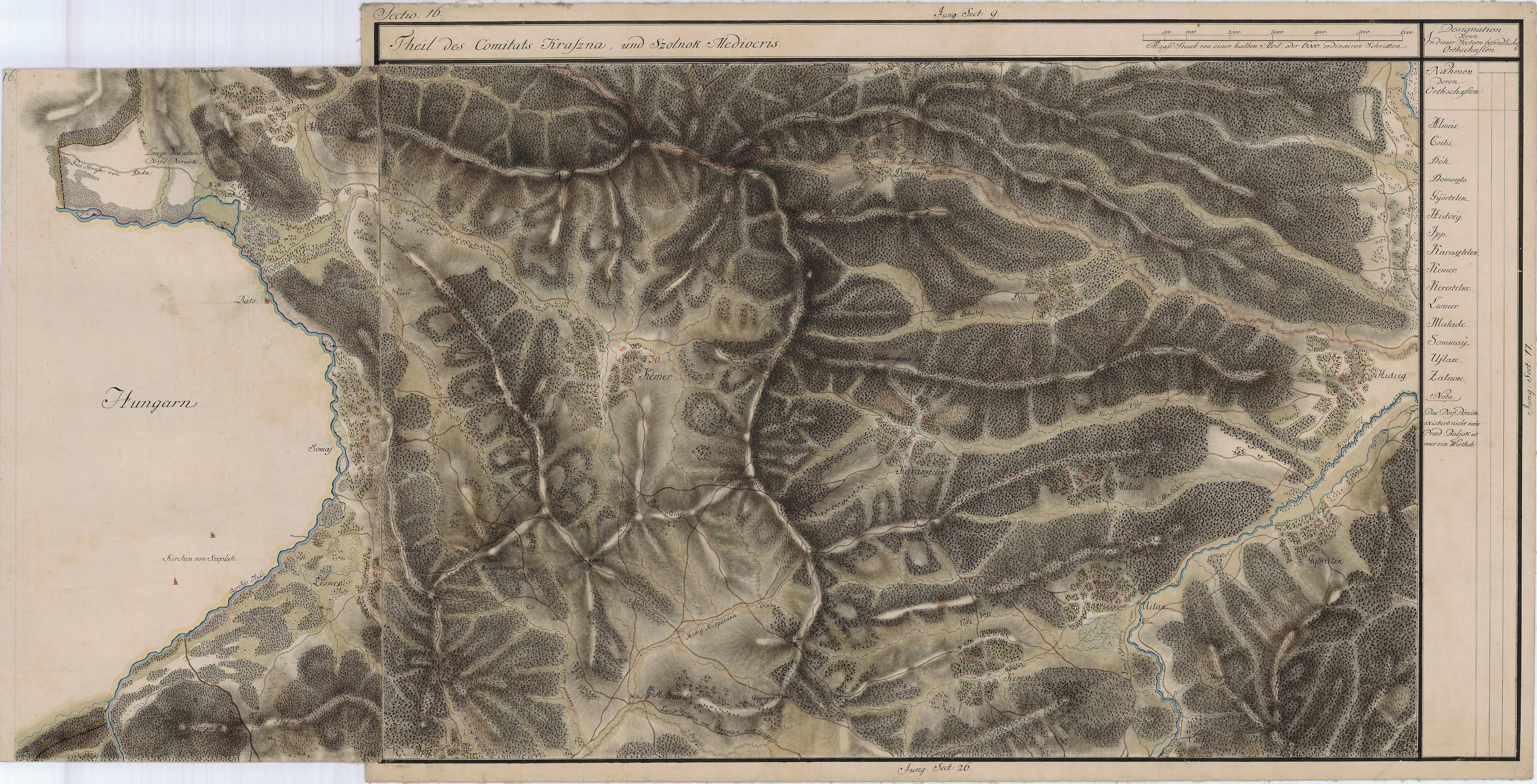
In the 18th century

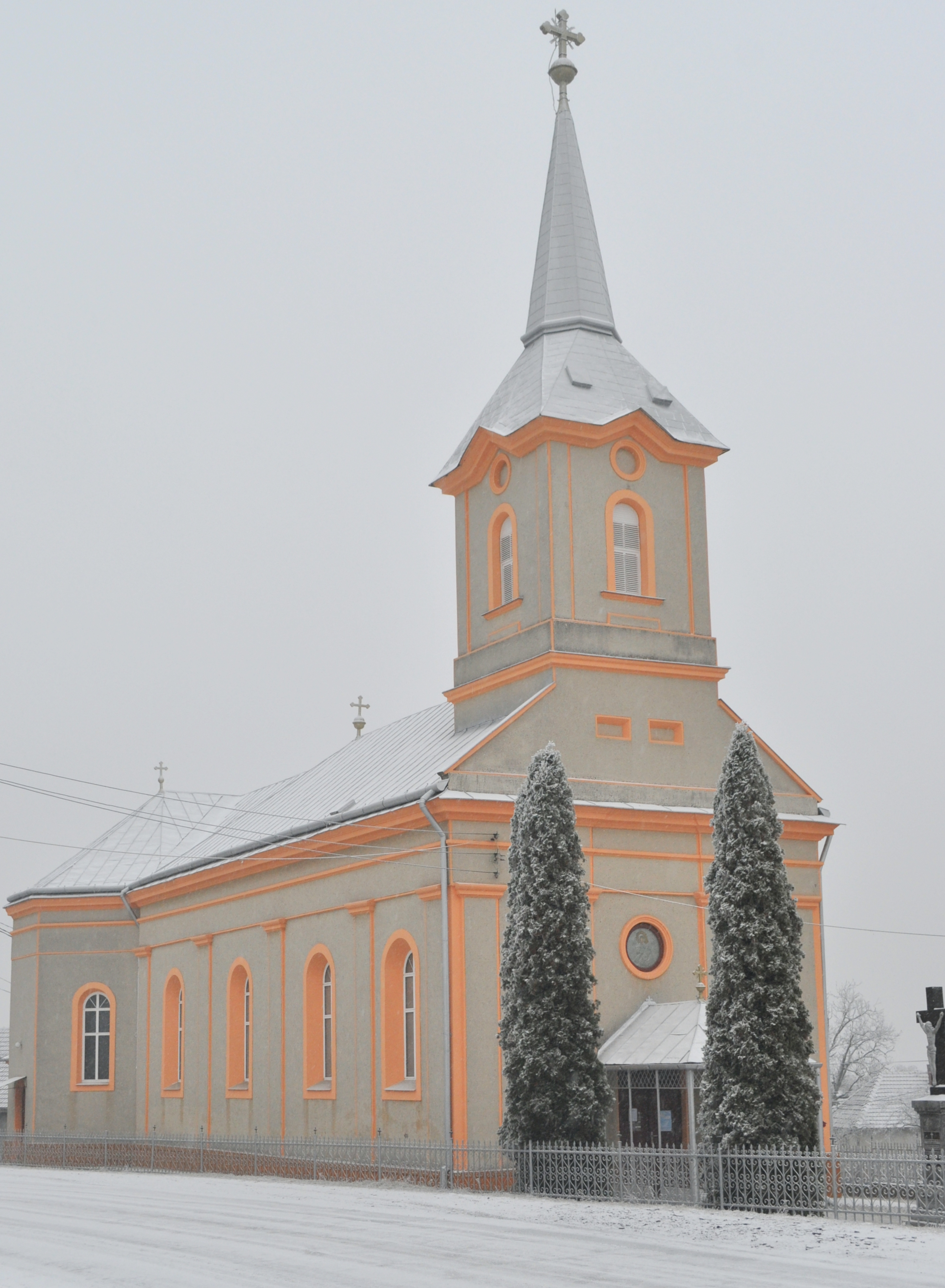
Măeriște Orthodox church

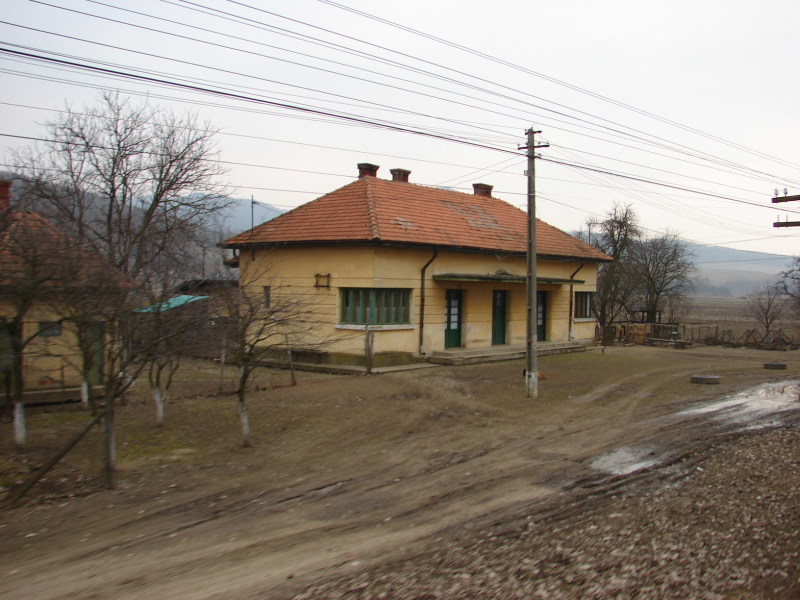
Giurtelecu Șimleului

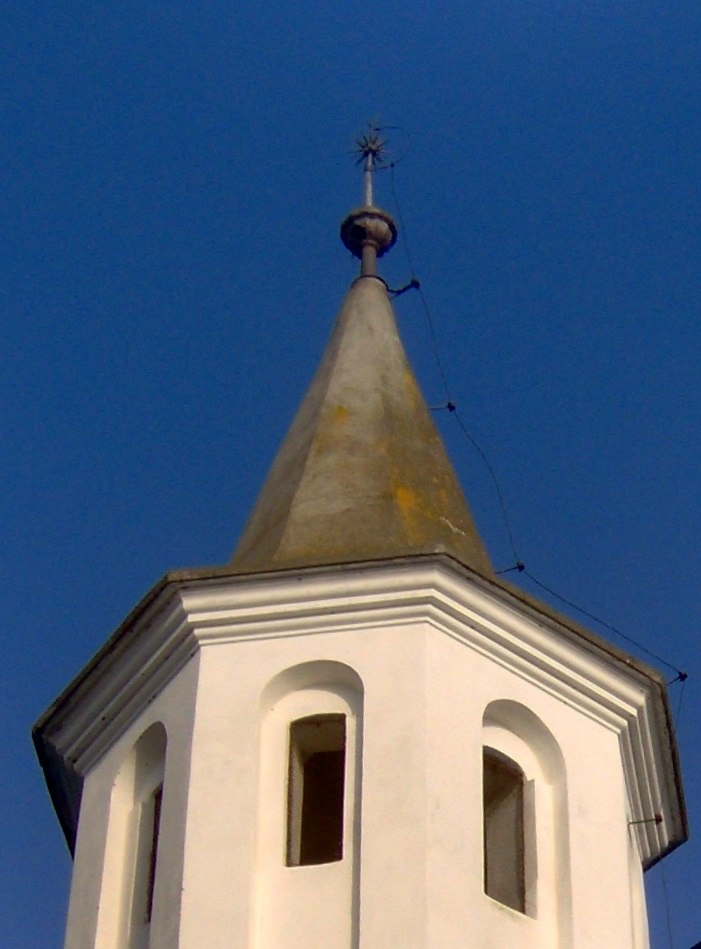
Reformed Church, Uileacu Șimleului

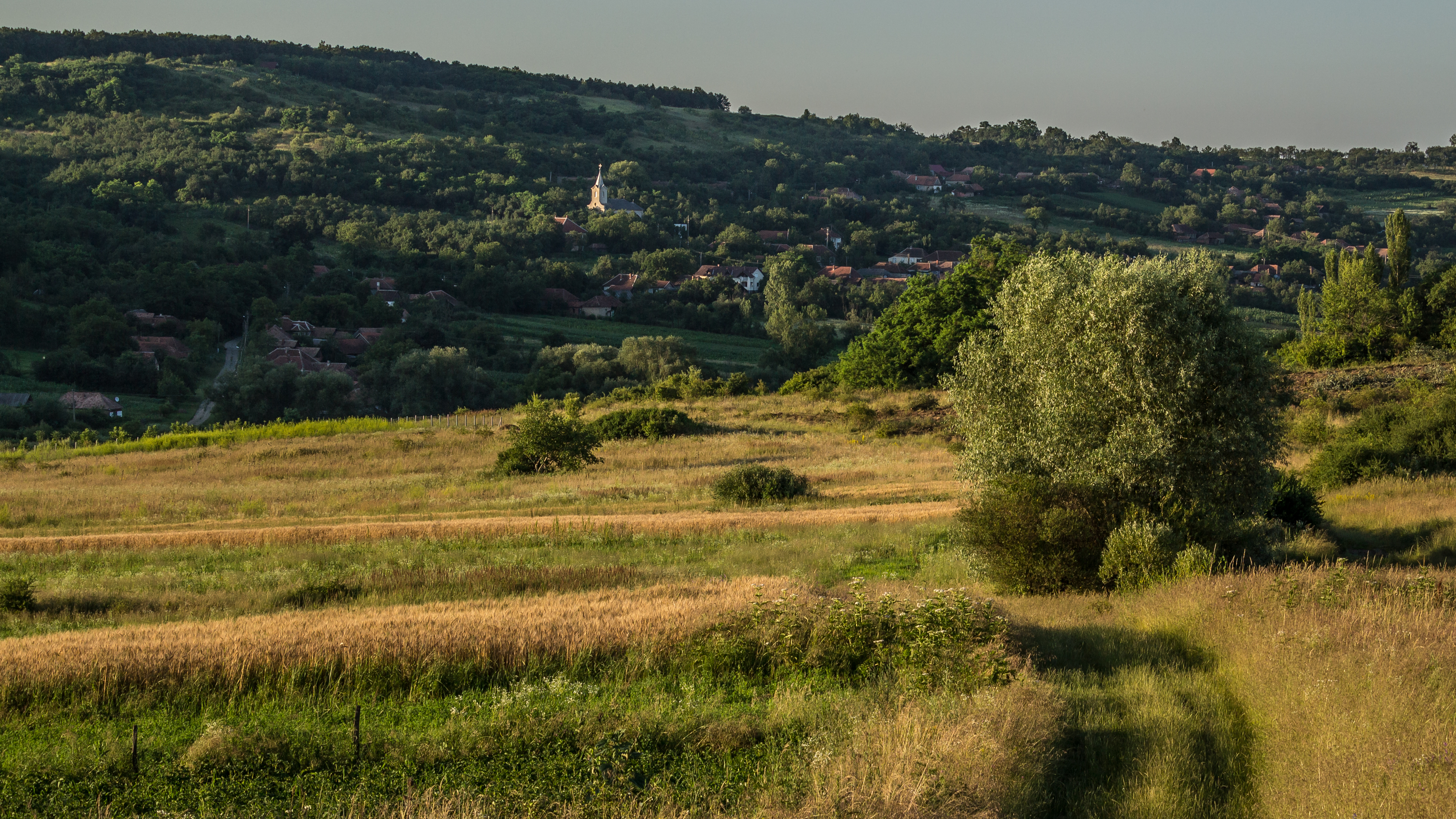
Mălădia seen from the west

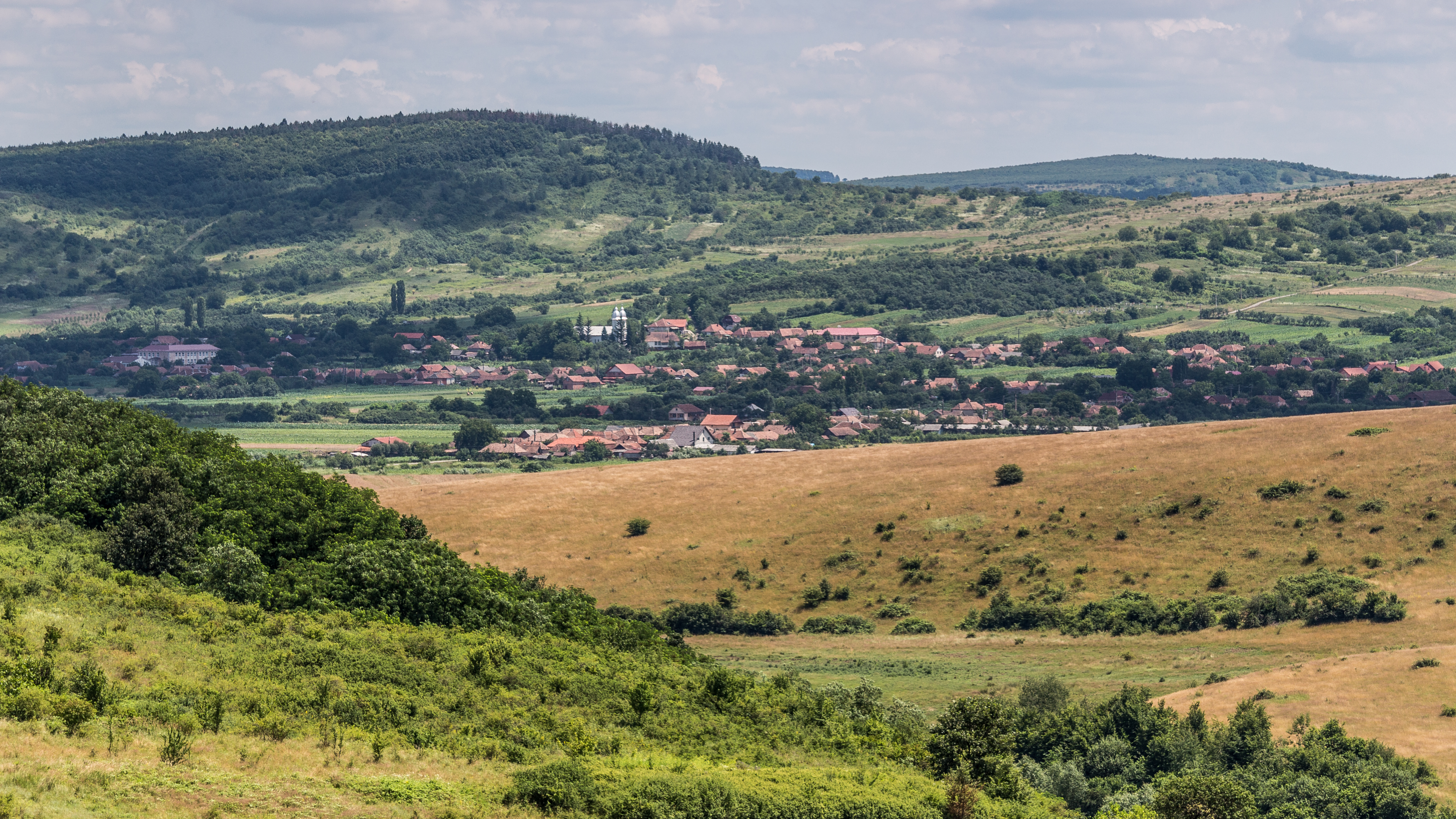

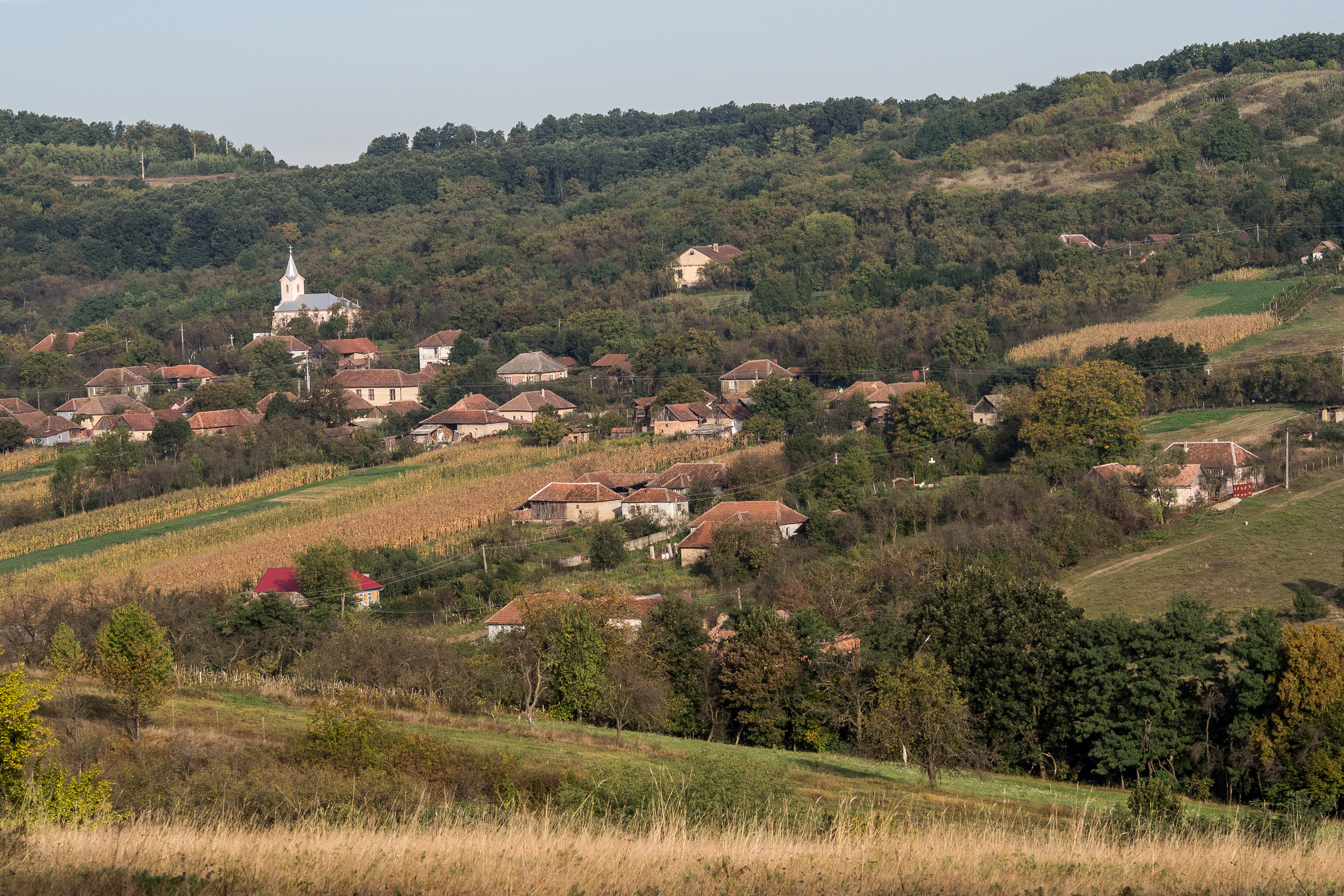

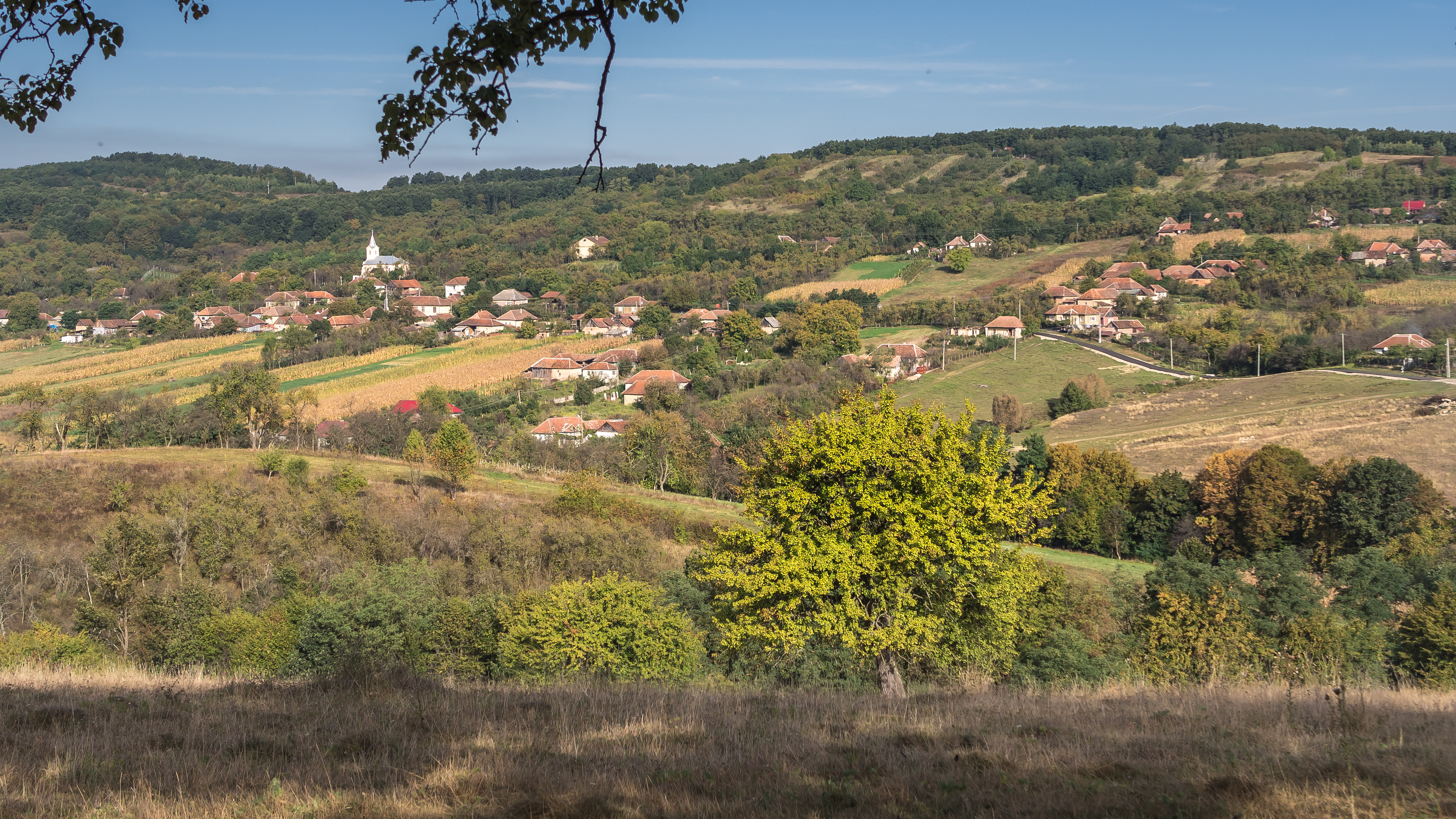
Mălădia seen from the south

== See also ==
- Wooden Church, Criștelec, built 1785
