= Pericei =

Pericei Szilágyperecsen
- Commune
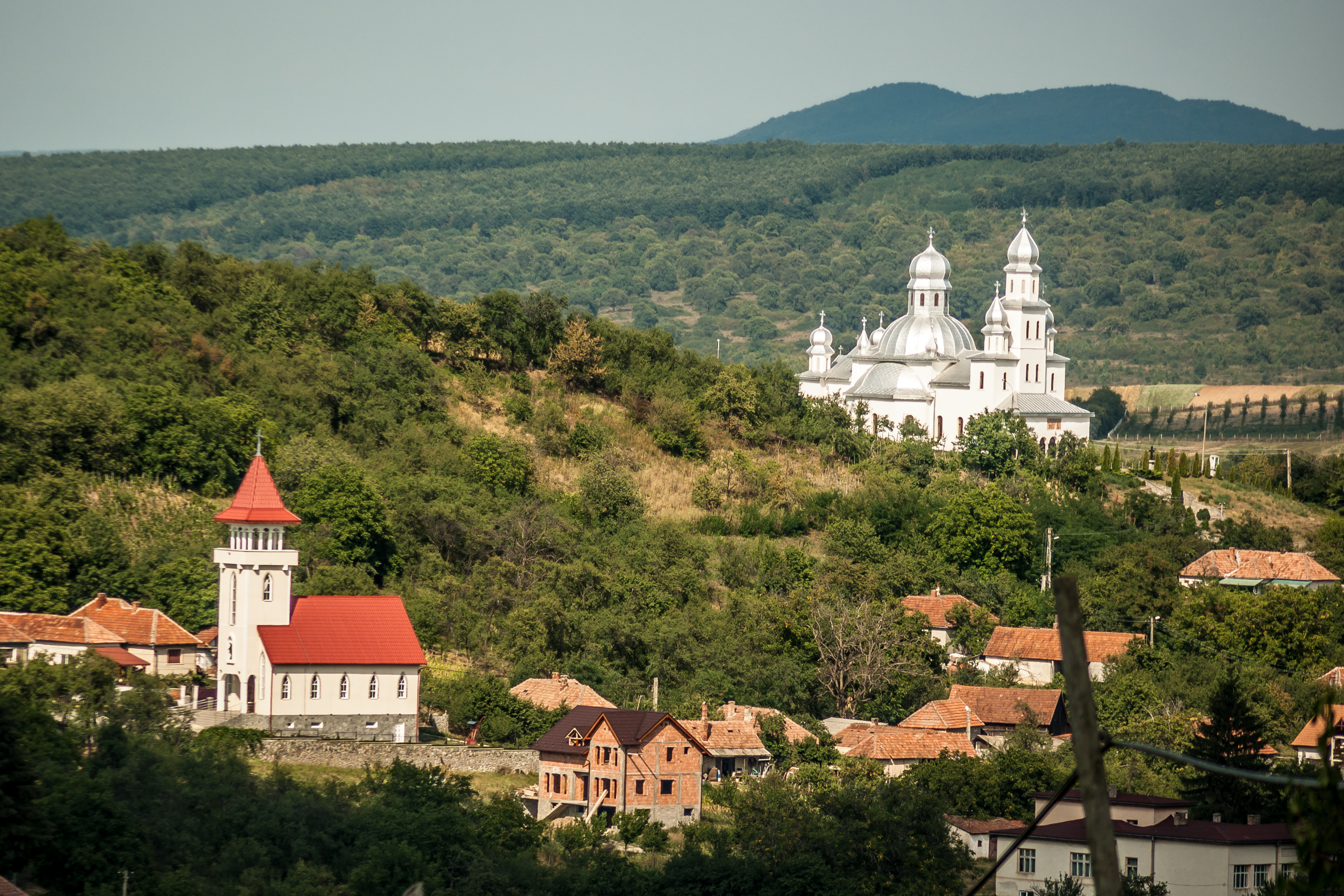
- Churches in Bădăcin village

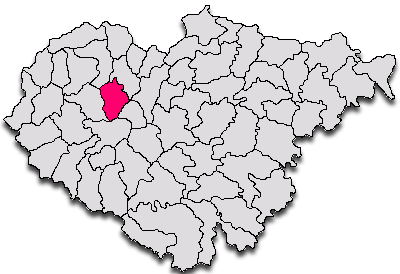
- Location in Sălaj County

- Location in Romania
- Coordinates: 47°13′54″N 22°51′52″E
- Country: Romania
- County: Sălaj

Government
  - Mayor (2020–2024): Csaba Boncidai (UDMR)
- Area: 59.60 km^{2} (23.01 sq mi)
- Elevation: 213 m (699 ft)
- Population (2021-12-01): 3,497
  - Density: 58.67/km^{2} (152.0/sq mi)
- Time zone: UTC+02:00 (EET)
  - Summer (DST): UTC+03:00 (EEST)
- Postal code: 457265-66
- Area code: +(40) 0260
- Vehicle reg.: SJ
- Website: www.comunapericeisj.ro

Pericei (Hungarian: Szilágyperecsen) is a commune located in Sălaj County, Crișana, Romania. It is composed of four villages: Bădăcin (Szilágybadacsony), Pericei, Periceiu Mic (Kisperecsentanya), and Sici (Somlyószécs).

== Geography ==
The commune is located in the central part of the county, 5.5 km (3.4 mi) east of the town of Șimleu Silvaniei and 22 km (14 mi) west of the county seat, Zalău; it is traversed by national road DN1H, which connects the two localities. Pericei lies on the banks of the river Crasna.

== Sights ==
- Orthodox Church in Bădăcin, built in the 18th century (1705), historic monument
- Reformed Church, Pericei, completed in 1769
- Iuliu Maniu native house in Bădăcin, built in the 19th century (1890), historic monument
- Orthodox church in Sici, built 1808. In the 17th-18th centuries the inhabitants of Sici were Calvinist Hungarians with a Protestant church. After political boundary changes, the inhabitants were Orthodox Romanians.

== Politics ==
=== 2012 election ===
The Pericei Council, elected in the 2012 local government elections, is made up of 21 councilors, with the following party composition: 9-Democratic Union of Hungarians in Romania, 3-Democratic Liberal Party, 1-Hungarian Civic Party. Mayor Csaba Boncidai was re-elected.

| Party | Seats | 2012 Zalău Council |
|---|---|---|
| Democratic Union of Hungarians in Romania | 9 | |
| Democratic Liberal Party | 3 | |
| Hungarian Civic Party | 1 | |

=== 2008 elections ===
Mayor Csaba Boncidai was re-elected.

=== 2004 elections ===
Csaba Boncidai was elected mayor of the commune.

| Party | Seats | 2004 Pericei Council |
|---|---|---|
| Democratic Union of Hungarians in Romania | 8 | |
| Social Democratic Party | 2 | |
| Democratic Party | 1 | |
| National Liberal Party | 1 | |
| Christian-Democratic National Peasants' Party | 1 | |

== Natives ==
- Virgil Ardelean (born 1950), police chief
- Victor Deleu (1876–1939), politician
- Iuliu Maniu (1873–1953), lawyer and politician
