= Eva Mozes Kor =

Holocaust survivor (1934–2019)

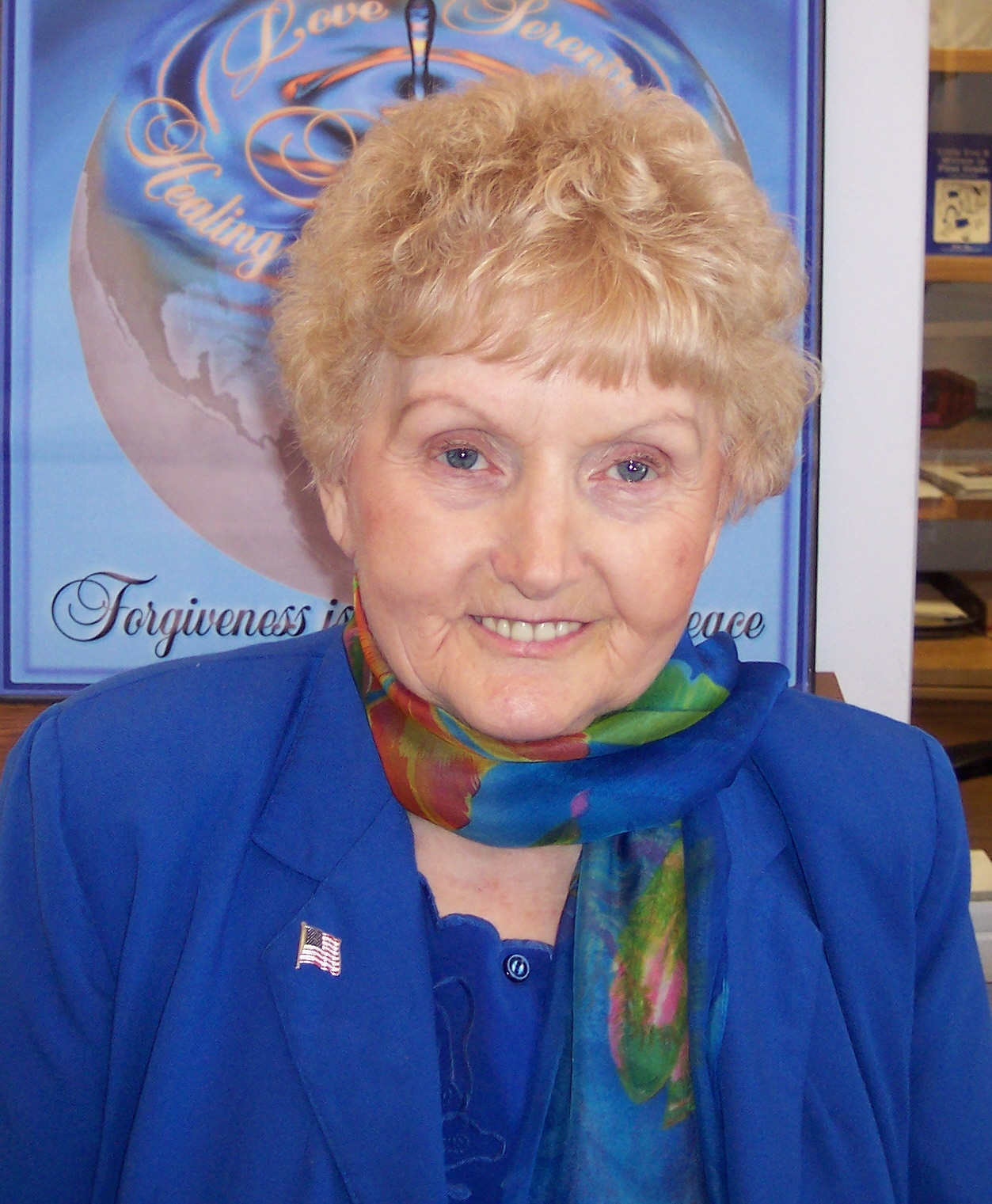
- Kor in 2016
- Born: Eva Mozes; January 31, 1934; Porţ, Kingdom of Romania
- Died: July 4, 2019 (aged 85); Kraków, Poland
- Citizenship: United States
- Known for: Founder of CANDLES Holocaust Museum and Education Center
- Television: Forgiving Dr. Mengele
- Spouse: Michael Kor
- Children: 2

Eva Mozes Kor (January 31, 1934 – July 4, 2019) was a Romanian-born American survivor of the Holocaust. Along with her twin sister Miriam, Kor was subjected to human experimentation under the direction of Nazi German Schutzstaffel (SS) officer and physician Josef Mengele at the Auschwitz concentration camp in German-occupied Poland during World War II. Her parents and two older sisters were killed in the gas chambers at Birkenau.

Kor founded the organization CANDLES (an acronym for "Children of Auschwitz Nazi Deadly Lab Experiments Survivors") in 1984 with an aim to educate the public about eugenics, the Holocaust, and the power of forgiveness. CANDLES successfully located 122 other survivors of Mengele's experiments.

After meeting Hans Münch, Kor received international attention when she made the controversial decision to publicly forgive the Nazis for what they had done to her. This story was later explored in the 2006 documentary Forgiving Dr. Mengele. She authored or co-authored six books, and took part in numerous memorial services and projects.

== Early life ==
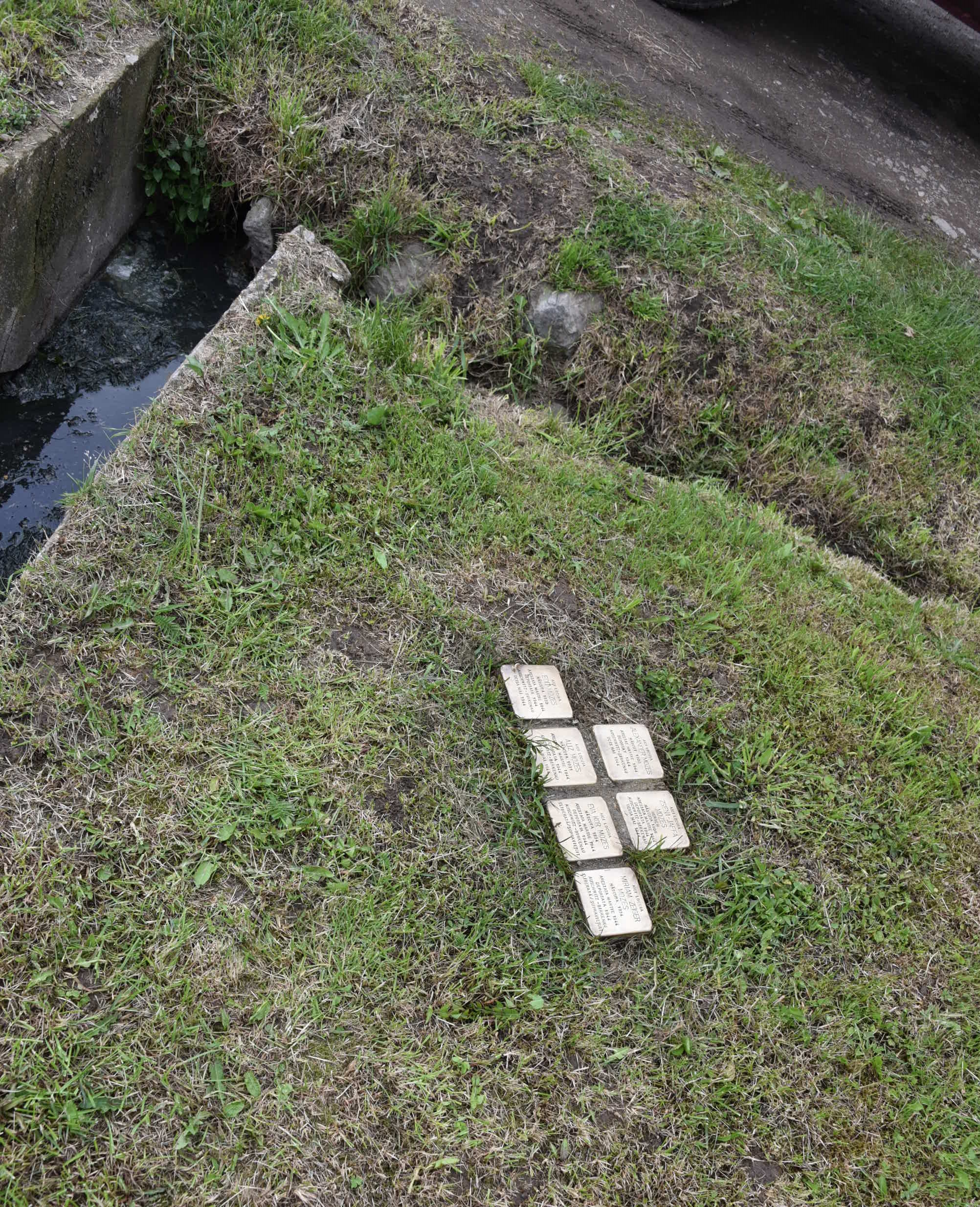
Stolpersteine on the location of the Mozes family house in Porţz, Romania

Eva Mozes was born in 1934 in Porţz, Kingdom of Romania, to Alexander and Jaffa Mozes, farmers who were the only Jewish residents in the area. She had three siblings: Edit, Aliz, and her twin sister Miriam.

In 1940, when Eva and Miriam were five, their village, along with Northern Transylvania, was taken back by Hungary, according to the Second Vienna Award. In the spring of 1944, after the German occupation of Hungary, the family was transported to the regional ghetto at Somlyócsehi (today Cehei, Romania) in Szilágysomlyó (today Şimleu Silvaniei, Romania). During their time at the ghetto, the family had no housing but had to make tents out of sheets. A few weeks later they were transported to the Auschwitz concentration camp.

== The Holocaust ==
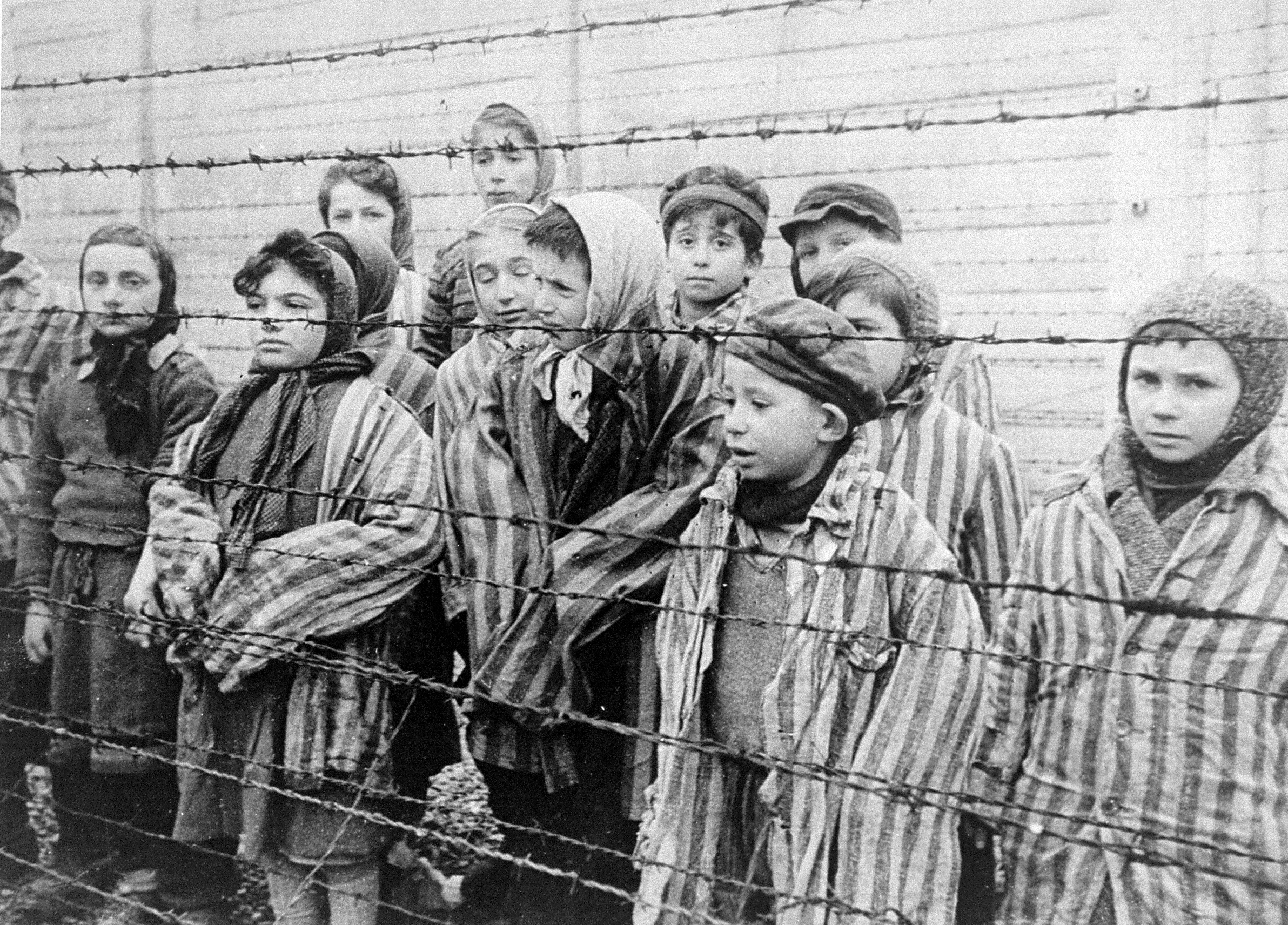
January 1945: Twin Child Survivors of Auschwitz: Miriam and Eva wear knitted hats

Eva Mozes Kor, her twin sister Miriam, two older sisters, and parents were deported from the Cehei ghetto to Auschwitz-Birkenau concentration camp in May 1944. After a four-day journey in cattle cars, they arrived at Auschwitz II-Birkenau. An SS guard approached Eva's mother during the selection of new arrivals (those to work and those to go straight to the gas chambers) and tricked her into revealing that Eva and Miriam were twins. The twins were immediately taken away despite her mother's protests. Kor said that was the last time she ever saw her mother, her arms were stretched out in despair as she was pulled away. "I never even got to say goodbye to her. But I didn't really understand that this would be the last time we would see her", she said.

The twins spent the next nine months in this camp until their liberation being subject to experimentation led by SS Doctor Josef Mengele. In her documentary Forgiving Dr. Mengele, Kor mentions that her weekly ordeal would be twofold. On Mondays, Wednesdays, and Fridays the Nazi doctors would put her and her twin, and many other twins, naked in a room for six to eight hours and then measure every part of their bodies. Data would compare the two twins and then against previous measurements. On Tuesdays, Thursdays, and Saturdays, SS doctors would take Kor to a blood lab and tie both of her arms to restrict blood flow, then a large amount of blood would be taken from the left arm while a minimum of five injections with unknown substances would be given in the right arm. After some injections, she became very ill with a very high fever while her legs and arms became swollen and painful; she was trembling as the sun burned her skin and she had huge red spots covering her body. She was taken to Dr. Mengele, who checked her fever instead of taking her measurements. She remembers him saying that she was going to die within two weeks. Kor recalled being determined not to fulfill their verdict; she was determined to survive. She was taken to the hospital barracks. During that time, she only has one clear memory of the two weeks she spent there: crawling across the floor (because she was no longer able to walk) to reach a faucet with water. As she crawled, she faded in and out of consciousness, telling herself, "I must survive, I must survive". After two weeks, her fever broke and she was reunited with her sister three weeks later.

On January 27, 1945, the Red Army liberated Auschwitz. Kor and her sister were among approximately 180 children, most of whom were twins, to survive the camp. First they were sent to a convent in Katowice, Poland, which was being used as an orphanage. By searching a nearby displaced person's camp, Eva and Miriam located Rosalita Csengeri, a friend of their mother who also had twin daughters used by Mengele. Csengeri took responsibility for Eva and Miriam, helping them return to Romania.

== Later life ==
After the war, Eva and Miriam lived in Cluj, Romania, with their Aunt Irena (also a survivor) where they went to school and attempted to recover from their experiences at Auschwitz and adjust to life under Communist rule. In 1950, at age 16, they both received permission to leave Romania and immigrated to Israel, arriving in the port city of Haifa. They both served in the Israeli army; Eva served for eight years. Both Eva and Miriam attended an agricultural school as they adjusted to life after the Holocaust. Eva became a draftsman and attained the rank of Sergeant Major in the Israeli Army Engineering Corps.

In 1960, Eva married Michael Kor, an American citizen and a fellow Holocaust survivor, and she joined him in the United States. In 1965, Eva Kor became a US citizen. They raised their two children in Terre Haute, Indiana. In Terre Haute, the Holocaust was rarely discussed, even among survivors. With no outlet for her anger, she once berated an elementary teacher for wasting food by coloring Easter eggs and became a target for pranks by neighborhood kids due to her "unlikable" demeanor. Someone even painted a swastika and an antisemitic phrase on her home.

Into adulthood, Eva suffered numerous health problems that she believed were a result of her treatment and experiments at Auschwitz. Because Miriam had kidney problems after her last pregnancy, Eva donated one of her kidneys to Miriam, saying: "I have one sister and two kidneys, so it was an easy choice". Miriam died in 1993 of kidney cancer.

== Activism and public work ==
In April 1978, Kor began earning respect in her community and around the world after being interviewed on a local affiliate twice while the NBC miniseries Holocaust, starring Meryl Streep and James Woods, was broadcast.

In 1978, she and Miriam, who was still living in Israel, began locating other survivors of the experiments. In 1984, Eva founded CANDLES ("Children of Auschwitz Nazi Deadly Lab Experiments Survivors"), an organization which she was president of and remained active in until her death.

She returned to Auschwitz for the first time in 1984 where she pledged to tell her family's story. When Dr. Mengele's remains were officially declared found in Brazil, Kor was unsatisfied. In 1986, at a remembrance ceremony at the U.S. Capitol attended by Vice President George H. W. Bush and Elie Wiesel (which she met during the Holocaust ), Kor held up a sign demanding more evidence about Mengele and screamed "bloody murder" while being dragged away by Capitol police.

In the 1990s, Kor became even more controversial when she publicly forgave all of the Nazis including Mengele and Adolf Hitler. She clarified that she was only speaking for herself, but her campaign for forgiveness became the core of her legacy for the rest of her life.

Eva was highly active through the time of her death, traveling around the world lecturing and presenting, and also gave guided tours of Auschwitz. She returned to Auschwitz on numerous occasions, often accompanied by friends and members of the community. This pilgrimage took place each summer.

In 1999, Kor filed a lawsuit against pharmaceutical company Bayer for its part in the human experiments perpetrated at the camps. The parties negotiated a settlement establishing the creation of a $5 billion fund for the Foundation Remembrance, Responsibility and Future.

She maintained a small holocaust museum in Terre Haute that was firebombed in 2003.

In 2007, Kor worked with Indiana state legislators Clyde Kersey and Tim Skinner to gain passage of a law requiring Holocaust education in secondary schools. She was featured in the CNN documentaries "Voices of Auschwitz" in January 2015, and "Incredible Survivors" in 2016.

In April 2015, she traveled to Germany to testify in the trial of former Nazi Oskar Gröning. During this trial, Kor and Gröning shared an embrace and a kiss, with Kor thanking Gröning for his willingness, at age 93, to testify as to what happened more than 70 years ago. On January 23, 2016, Kor was spotlighted in The Girl Who Forgave the Nazis, a British documentary by Channel 4. This explores the meeting between Kor and Groening.

In 2016, Kor was one of 13 Holocaust survivors as part of a USC Shoah Foundation's New Dimension in Testimony technology project that makes it appear as if her virtual avatar is able to answer questions as if he or she were in the room. Her hologram was interviewed by Lesley Stahl on the television news program 60 Minutes after her death.

A documentary film, Eva:A-7063, premiered on April 5, 2018, at Butler University in Indianapolis. It is narrated by Ed Asner and features interviews with Elliott Gould, several Holocaust historians, and people from Kor's life. It has been broadcast on PBS.

Kor as an adult, developed a philosophy that in order to deal with the recovery from her experiences in the concentration camps, she shall forgive the ones who are responsible for the treatment she received in the camps. She spent months writing letters addressed to various individuals involved in the camp. She even wrote one to "The Angel of Death". These helped her achieve personal psychological relief. Not everyone has agreed with her decision to forgive but she maintained that this approach helped with her own rehabilitation

== Death ==
On July 4, 2019, Kor died while in Kraków, Poland, accompanying a CANDLES group on an educational trip to Auschwitz. She died of natural causes at 85 years old. She made the trip annually to share her childhood experiences and give tours from her perspective as a survivor.

On 12 July, Kor was featured in the BBC Radio 4 obituary programme Last Word.

== Awards and honors ==
Kor was recognized by four Indiana governors: twice with the Sagamore of the Wabash Award, once with Indiana's Distinguished Hoosier Award, and once in 2017 with the Sachem Award, the highest honor of the State of Indiana. In April 2017, Kor was also named the Grand Marshal of the Indianapolis 500 Festival Parade.

In May 2015, she received an Honorary Doctorate of Humane Letters from Butler University in Indianapolis, Indiana. She also received the 2015 Wabash Valley Women of Influence Award, sponsored by the United Way of the Wabash Valley, the 2015 Anne Frank Change the World Award from the Wassmuth Center for Human Rights in Boise, Idaho, and the 2015 Mike Vogel Humanitarian Award.

Kor was honored at the 24th Annual ADL in Concert Against Hate on November 8, 2018, for "resilience, compassion, and love in the face of hatred and violence." In 2020, she was posthumously given the 'Friend of Education' award by the Indiana State Teachers Association.

In total she has received over 30 awards from service organizations, governing bodies, and universities including three honorary doctorates.

After Kor died in 2019, a mural was commissioned in Indianapolis showcasing her signature peace sign. The 53-foot-tall portrait of Kor is supposed to contrast her physically short stature. The people who commissioned the mural wanted her to stand "larger than life". Her mural joins those of other important Hoosier figures like Kurt Vonnegut and Mari Evans. The mural was completed in November 2020.

== Works ==
- Echoes from Auschwitz: Dr. Mengele's Twins: The Story of Eva and Miriam Mozes (1995) with Mary Wright — ISBN 978-0-9643807-6-9
- Surviving the Angel of Death: The Story of a Mengele Twin in Auschwitz (2009) with Lisa Rojany Buccieri — ISBN 1-933718-28-5
- Ich habe den Todesengel überlebt : ein Mengele-Opfer erzählt (2012) with Lisa Rojany Buccieri — ISBN 978-3-570-40109-5
- Little Eva & Miriam in First Grade (1994) Eva Mozes Kor – OCLC 33324155
- Forgiving Dr. Mengele (2006) First Run Features – Bob Hercules and Cheri Pugh
- Die Macht Des Vergebens (2016) with Guido Eckert – ISBN 978-3-7109-0011-2
- "Nazi Experiments as Viewed by a Survivor of Mengele's Experiments" (1992) in When Medicine Went Mad: Bioethics and the Holocaust by Arthur Caplan – ISBN 978-1461267515
