= Jewish Architectural Heritage Foundation =

US-based non-profit organization

Jewish Architectural Heritage Foundation, Inc.
- JAHF Logo
- Formation: 2004; 22 years ago
- Type: Non-profit
- Headquarters: Staten Island, New York
- Key people: Adam Aaron Wapniak, Alexander Hecht, Joey Hecht, Abraham Gewirtz, Dan Bucsescu, Mihaela Gross, Natalia Gross, Daniel Stejerean
- Website: www.jahf.nyc

The Jewish Architectural Heritage Foundation is a non-profit, Staten Island, New York-based corporation which assumes responsibility for maintaining, restoring, renovating and building Jewish heritage buildings and monuments on a global scale. It has 501(c)(3) tax-exempt status.

The organization's work is philanthropic in nature, and is focused on restoring and erecting Jewish public buildings and holy sites. Many of its activities are planned in disadvantaged communities, serving to benefit members of all faiths and creeds and promoting inter-racial tolerance and understanding of local heritage. Currently, its focus is set on projects within Romania and Hungary.

== Projects ==
=== Northern Transylvania Holocaust Memorial Museum ===
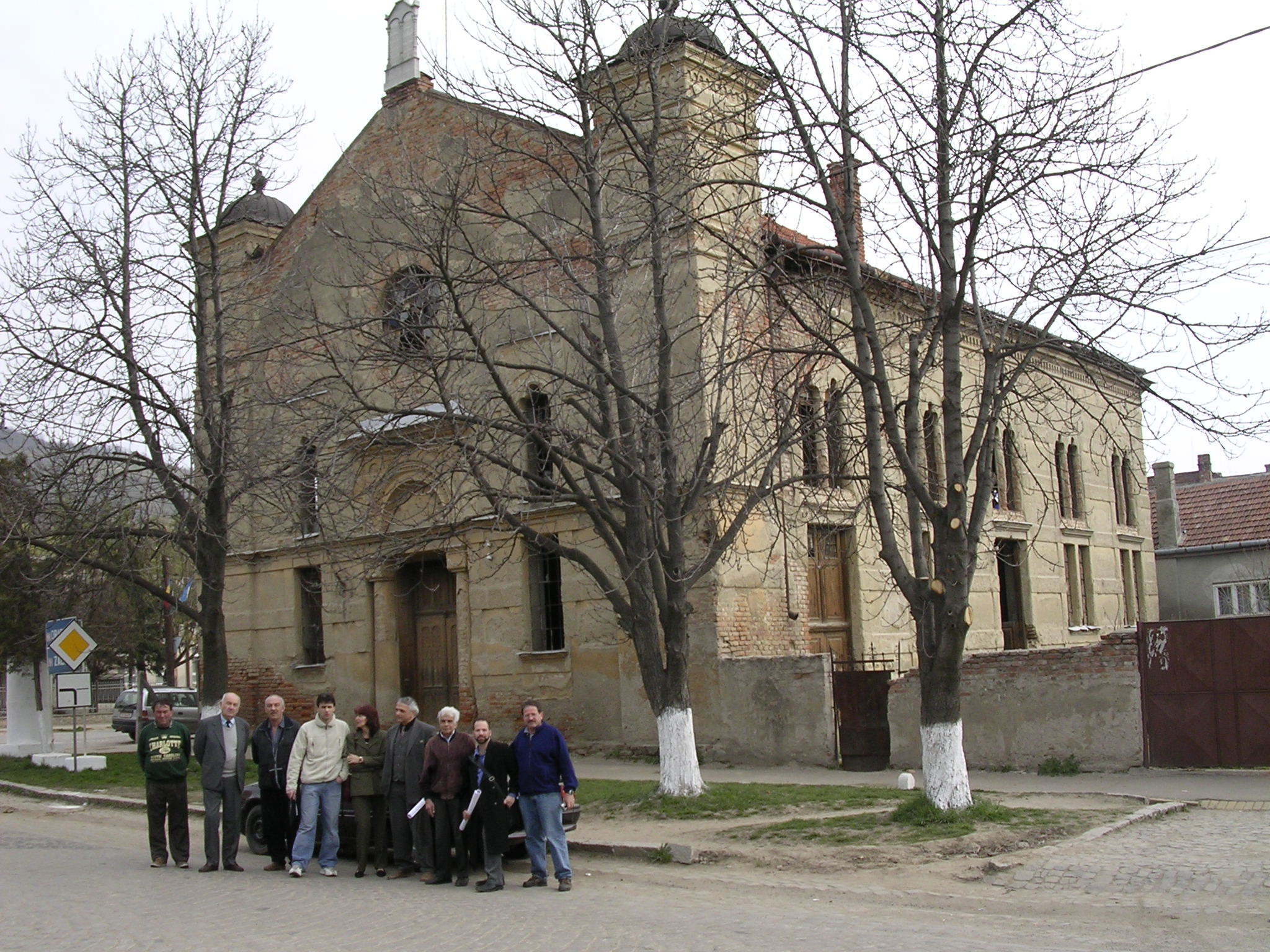
Original Project Team standing outside Synagogue

The Northern Transylvania Holocaust Memorial Museum is located in Șimleu Silvaniei, Romania, and was opened September 11, 2005. The museum is operated and maintained by the Jewish Architectural Heritage Foundation of New York and Asociata Memoralia Hebraica Nusfalau—a Romanian NGO, with the support of the Claims Conference, Elie Wiesel National Institute for Studying the Holocaust in Romania, among other philanthropic and pedagogical partners, such as Oliver Lustig, Liviu Beris, Mihail E. Ionescu, Felicia Waldman, Lya Benjamin and Harry Kuller.

The old synagogue of Simleu Silvaniei was erected in 1876. In May/June 1944, the area's Jewish population was forced out of their homes into the brutal Cehei ghetto and from there packed into cattle cars and transported to Auschwitz-Birkenau. Over 160,000 Jews from the region perished. Of those few remaining Jews who survived the Holocaust and remained in Romania, the last Jewish family emigrated from the region during the mid-1960s, while the country was still under Communist rule. The loss of its congregation left the Synagogue to fate, decaying silently over time.

JAHF launched a vigorous campaign driving the restoration project forward. Its efforts contributed to raising funds to complete construction, establishing educational criterion, and supported pedagogical training for the regional school systems. The Museum now functions as an educational hub and essential resource for Holocaust Education in the region. Guided tours tailored to students are offered daily, The museum centerpiece is the synagogue originally built in 1876.

=== Şimleu Silvaniei Multicultural Holocaust Education and Research Center ===
Şimleu Silvaniei Multicultural Holocaust Education and Research Center

In the Spring of 2008, the Museum inaugurated the annex to the Northern Transylvania Holocaust Memorial Museum: the Şimleu Silvaniei Multicultural Holocaust Education and Research Center. The facility is now used to host lectures and seminars about the Holocaust, with programs geared to students, teachers and academics. The teacher program encourages and helps teachers to sensitively incorporate the subject of the Holocaust into their curriculum, a discipline sorely lacking in Romania's school system. JAHF is devoted to maintaining operations at the Holocaust Education and Research Center and is a financial supporter of its pedagogical activities.

=== Cehei Ghetto Memorial ===
Marker at the site of the makeshift Cehei Ghetto, a former brickyard owned by a local Jewish Family

The Jews of Sălaj County were concentrated in the Klein Brickyard of Cehei, in a marshy and muddy area about three miles from Şimleu Silvaniei. At its peak in May 1944, the ghetto held about 8,500 Jews. Among these were the Jews from the communities in the districts of Crasna, Cehu Silvaniei, Jibou, Şimleu Silvaniei, Supuru de Jos, Tăşnad, and Zalău. Since the brick-drying sheds were rather limited, many of the ghetto inhabitants were compelled to live under the open sky. The ghetto was guarded by a special unit of gendarmes from Budapest and operated under the command of Krasznai, one of the most cruel ghetto commanders in Hungary.

As a result of torture, malnutrition, and a totally inadequate water supply in the ghetto, the Jews of Sălaj County arrived at Auschwitz in such poor condition, so that an unusually large percentage were selected for gassing immediately upon arrival. The deportations from Cehei were carried out in three transports between May 31 and June 8.

Although built structures no longer exist on the site of the former brickyard, the Jewish Architectural Heritage Foundation has set up signposts commemorating the events that took place at what is now known as the Cehei Ghetto. Organized tours frequently visit the site, as scheduled by the Northern Transylvania Holocaust Memorial Museum JAHF is currently negotiating the procurement of an authentic cattle car that was used to transport Jews to the death camps, for a permanent exhibit at the site of the former ghetto.

=== Nuşfalău Memorial ===
Nuşfalău Holocaust Memorial designed by Wapniak

The Jewish Architectural Heritage Foundation is planning on the construction of a Holocaust Memorial designed by Architect Adam Aaron Wapniak on the site of the old Nuşfalău Synagogue, directly adjacent to an existing War memorial. The barren site reflects the absence of the town's former Jewish population. Embracing dichotomous design; the steel tracks represent the grotesqueness of the Holocaust, as well as the temporal journey of the Jewish people. Resembling a flower, the breach in the tracks is emblematic of incidents of persecution and repression—all the while rising forth, blooming like a lotus.

=== The Jibou Cemetery Restoration Project ===
JAHF has funded the Restoration of the Jewish Cemetery in Jibou, Romania—and has contributed to the care of other outlying cemeteries in the region. Typical tasks include straightening or righting fallen tombstones, inscription reparation and landscaping of these holy sites.

== Holocaust documentation ==
The Jewish Architectural Heritage Foundation has also completed a number of video documentaries, noting the personal accounts of individuals from around the Șimleu Silvaniei area. One documentary (currently in editing) features Elly Gross as she walks through the town of Simleu Silvaniei, giving an account of the Jews who once walked in its streets.

== Sister organizations ==
Asociata Memoralia Hebraica Nuşfalău

== Gallery ==
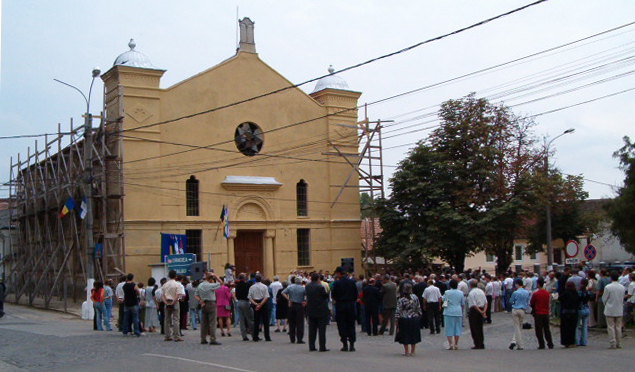
Dedication Ceremony at the Opening of JAHF's Flagship Project, the Northern Transylvania Holocaust Memorial Museum

Simleu Silvaniei Holocaust Education and Research Center

Group Trip to Cehei Ghetto Memorial
