= Lisa Rojany =

American author, editor and publishing executive (born 1964)

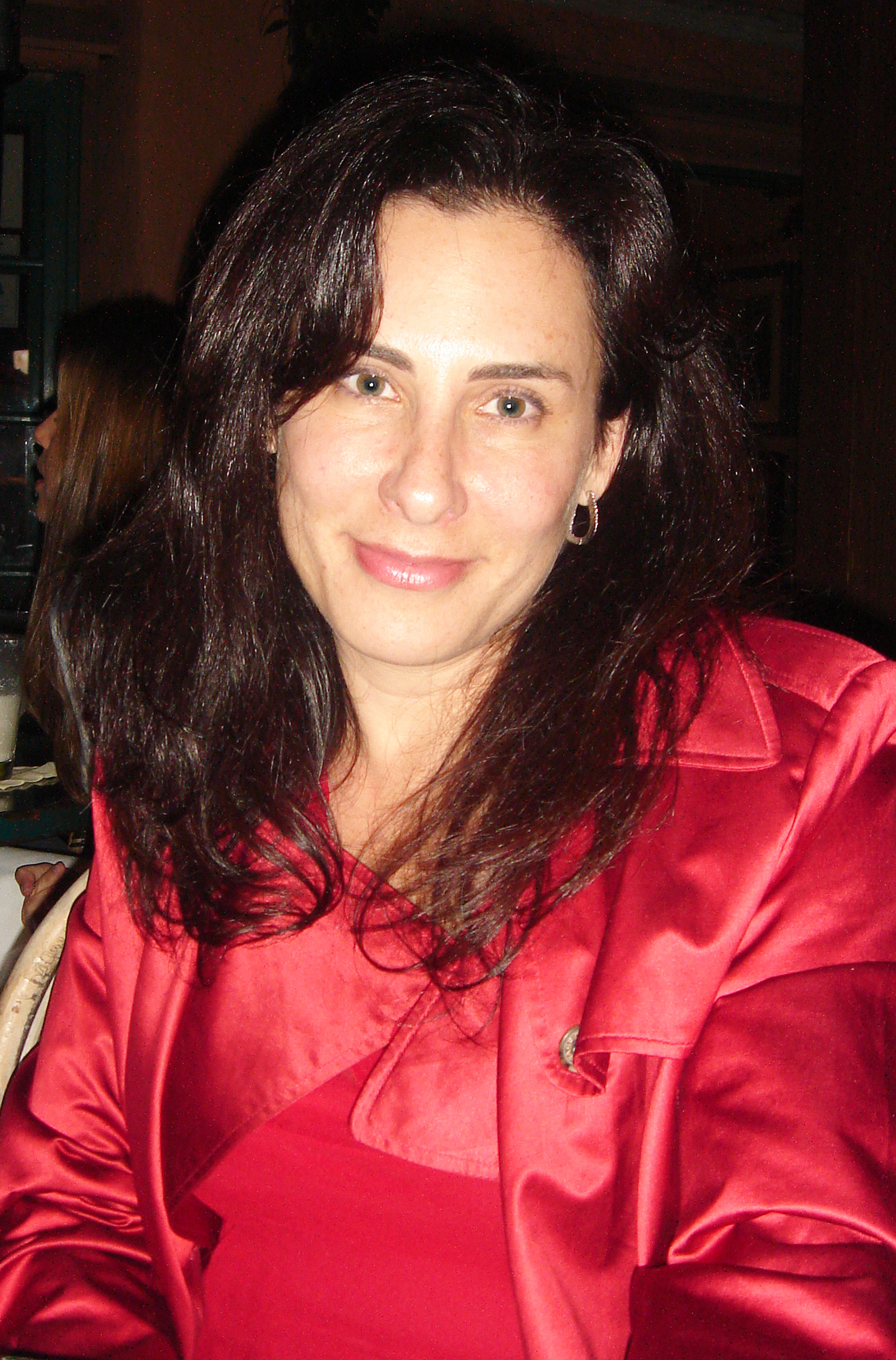
- Born: February 14, 1964 (age 62); Los Angeles, California
- Education: Master's degree in English and American literature
- Alma mater: UCLA, La Sorbonne Université, Alliance Française, Brown University
- Occupations: Author, editor and publishing executive
- Writing career
- Genres: Children's literature, young adult nonfiction, adult nonfiction
- Notable works: Writing Children's Books for Dummies, Surviving the Angel of Death: The True Story of a Mengele Twin in Auschwitz

Lisa Rojany (born February 14, 1964) is an American author, editor and publishing executive.

She has written dozens of children's books and was the lead author of Writing Children's Book for Dummies [Wiley, 2005, 2013] – an Amazon Bestseller about the process of writing, promoting, and publishing a book. She also co-wrote (with Julie Stav) the New York Times Bestselling adult nonfiction Fund Your Future [Berkley 2002].

Her 2009 YA nonfiction, Surviving the Angel of Death: The True Story of a Mengele Twin in Auschwitz, co-authored with Eva Kor, was named an American Booksellers Association ABC Best Books for Young Readers in 2017, and has received notoriety from Candles Holocaust Museum, the Jewish Book Council, as well as Archbishop Desmond Tutu, among others.

Her books have been translated to Spanish, German, Polish, Romanian, Chinese, Japanese, French, Italian, and other languages.

== Biography ==
Lisa Rojany was born on February 14, 1964, in Los Angeles, California, to parents Avi Rojany and Mary Marks. Her father, Avi Rojany, is a stockbroker and real estate magnate who immigrated to the U.S. from Israel in 1962. Her mother, Mary Marks, is an author and reviewer of cozy mysteries for Kensington Publishing Corp.

She has eight half-siblings, all younger – four half-brothers and four half-sisters, and 19 nieces and nephews.

Growing up in Los Angeles, Rojany attended Birmingham High School, and graduated in 1982. After high school, she attended UCLA, where she graduated magna cum laude and Phi Beta Kappa with Honors in 1986, receiving her B.A. in Communication Studies.

In 1986–1987, she studied language abroad in Paris, France, at both La Sorbonne Université and Alliance Française.

She then lived in Providence, Rhode Island, while pursuing her master's degree from Brown University, graduating with a master's in English and American literature in 1991.

Rojany has worked for Price Stern Sloan/Penguin RandomHouse, Golden Books, Americhip Books, Intervisual Books, Gateway Learning Corp (Hooked on Phonics), and MyPotential.com.

She married and divorced Kristian Buccieri (hence the name Rojany-Buccieri on several book authorships), and has three children: Olivia, Chloe, and Genevieve.

She currently lives in Los Angeles. She is the founder and owner of Editorial Services of Los Angeles, the publisher and editor in chief of New York Journal of Books as well as a reviewer, and is listed as a writer for Tanglewood Books. She is a member of the Society of Children's Book Writers and Illustrators, Who's Who of American Women, Who's Who, and the Authors Guild.

== Published works ==
=== Adult nonfiction ===
- Writing Children's Books for Dummies (with Peter Economy) [Wiley, 2005, 2013] [For Dummies; 2 edition, 2012] – ISBN 1118356462; ISBN 978-1118356463
- Fund Your Future (With Julie Stav) [Berkley, 2002] – ISBN 0425183610

=== Young adult nonfiction ===
- Surviving the Angel of Death: The True Story of a Mengele Twin in Auschwitz (with Eva Kor) [Tanglewood; First Trade Paper edition, 2012] – ISBN 1933718579; ISBN 978-1933718576

=== Young adult fiction ===
- Emergency: in the Emergency Room [Hodder & Stoughton Children's Division, 1997] – ISBN 0340698020; ISBN 978-0340698020
- Emergency: Truth or Consequences [Hodder Children's Books, 1997] – ASIN B01F7YB5E8
- Emergency Book 4: Staying Alive [Hodder & Stoughton Children's Division, 1997] – ISBN 0340698055; ISBN 978-0340698051
- Making the Grade (Code Blue) [HarperCollins, 1997] – ISBN 0061064254; ISBN 978-0061064258
- Code Blue: In the Emergency Room [HarperPaperbacks, 1996] – ISBN 006106422X, ISBN 9780061064227

=== Juvenile fiction/Children's books ===
- You Can Be a Doctor! (Barbie: You Can Be Series) [MATTEL, INC. and MATTEL EUROPA B.V., 2017] – ASIN B073C2NMXH
- Sammy's Suitcase [Random House Children's Books, 2008] – ISBN 0375842365, ISBN 9780375842368
- Let's Make Noise Around the House (with Debra Mostow Zakarin) [Silver Dolphin Books, 2007] – ISBN 1592236405; ISBN 978-1592236404
- Let's Make Noise at the Airport (with Debra Mostow Zakarin) [Silver Dolphin Books; Ina Ltf Po edition, 2007] – ISBN 1592236413; ISBN 978-1592236411
- Let's Make Noise at the Ballpark (with Debra Mostow Zakarin) [Readerlink Distribution Services, LLC, 2007] – ISBN 1592236421, ISBN 9781592236428
- Make Your Own Valentine Cards: 16 Cards and 50 Stickers [Golden Books; Gmc Crds edition, 1999] – ISBN 0307337014, ISBN 978-0307337016
- I Love You Because Love, Barbie (Pop-Up Book) [1998]– ASIN B012YT74BM
- Leave It to Beaver [Price Stern Sloan, 1997] – ISBN 0843178582, ISBN 9780843178586
- Big Trucks and Bigger Diggers [Price Stern Sloan; 1st edition, 1996] ISBN 0843179651, ISBN 978-0843179651
- Giant Giants & Magic Mermaid (Giant Fold-out Books) [Price Stern Sloan; 1st edition, 1996] – ISBN 084317966X; ISBN 978-0843179668
- Tell Me About When I Was a Baby [Price Stern Sloan; 1st edition, 1996] – ISBN 0843138599; ISBN 978-0843138597
- Casper: The Novelization [Mammoth, 1995] – ISBN 0749720336, ISBN 9780749720339
- Dena Dinosaur (Fuzzy Friends Board Books) [Penguin Group USA, 1995] – ISBN 084313786X, ISBN 9780843137866
- Gold Diggers: the Secret of Bear Mountain [Price Stern Sloan, 1995] – ISBN 084313917X, ISBN 9780843139174
- Hippo, Elephant, Whale, Giraffe (Giant Animal Fold-outs) [Price Stern Sloan, 1995] – ISBN 0843139102; ISBN 978-0843139105
- Kangaroo and Company (Giant Animal Fold-Outs) [Price Stern Sloan, 1995] – ISBN 0843139099; ISBN 978-0843139099
- Melvin Martian (Fuzzy Friends Board Books) [Price Stern Sloan, 1995] – ISBN 0843137878, ISBN 978-0843137873
- Morty Monster (Fuzzy Friends Board Books) [Price Stern Sloan, 1995] – ISBN 0843137886, ISBN 978-0843137880
- The Magic Feather: A Jamaican Legend [Troll Associates, 1995] – ISBN 0816737525, ISBN 9780816737529
- Wanda Witch (Fuzzy Friends Board Books) [Price Stern Sloan, 1995] – ISBN 0843137894; ISBN 978-0843137897
- Birthday [HarperCollins, 1994] – ISBN 0004127501, ISBN 9780004127507
- Cats: Those Wonderful Creatures (Little Books) [Andrews McMeel Pub, 1994] – ISBN 0836230523, ISBN 978-0836230529
- Friendship: What You Mean to Me [Andrews McMeel Publishing, 1994] – ISBN 0836230558, ISBN 9780836230550
- Make Your Own Valentines (with Craig Walker) [Penguin Group (USA) Incorporated, 1994] – ISBN 0843137517, ISBN 9780843137514
- Spring Gardens [HarperCollins, 1994] – ISBN 0001375032, ISBN 9780001375031
- Token of Love [HarperCollins, 1994] – ISBN 0001375024, ISBN 9780001375024
- Walt Disney's Alice in Wonderland: Down the Rabbit Hole [Disney Pr; Ltf edition, 1994] – ISBN 078683000X; ISBN 978-0786830008
- Wedding Sentiments (with Ariel Books) [Andrews McMeel Publishing, 1994] – ISBN 0836230574, ISBN 9780836230574
- Jake and Jenny on the Town: A Finger Puppet Lift-the-flap Book [Price Stern Sloan, 1993] – ISBN 0843135840, ISBN 9780843135848
- King Arthur's Camelot: A Pop-Up Castle and Four Storybooks [Dutton Books for Young Readers; Pop edition, 1993] – ISBN 0525450262; ISBN 978-0525450269
- The Story of Hanukkah: A Lift-The-Flap Rebus Book [Hyperion; English Language edition, 1993] – ISBN 1562824201; ISBN 978-1562824204
- Where's That Pig? [Price Stern Sloan, 1993] – ISBN 0843136049; ISBN 978-0843136043
- Exploring the Human Body [Barron's Juvenile, 1992] – ISBN 0812062981; ISBN 978-0812062984
- The Hands-On Book of Big Machines [Little Brown & Co (Juv); 1st edition, 1992] – ASIN B01A6576Z0
