= Jewish architecture =

Branch of architecture associated with Judaism

Jewish architecture comprises the architecture of Jewish religious buildings and other buildings that either incorporate Jewish elements in their design or are used by Jewish communities.

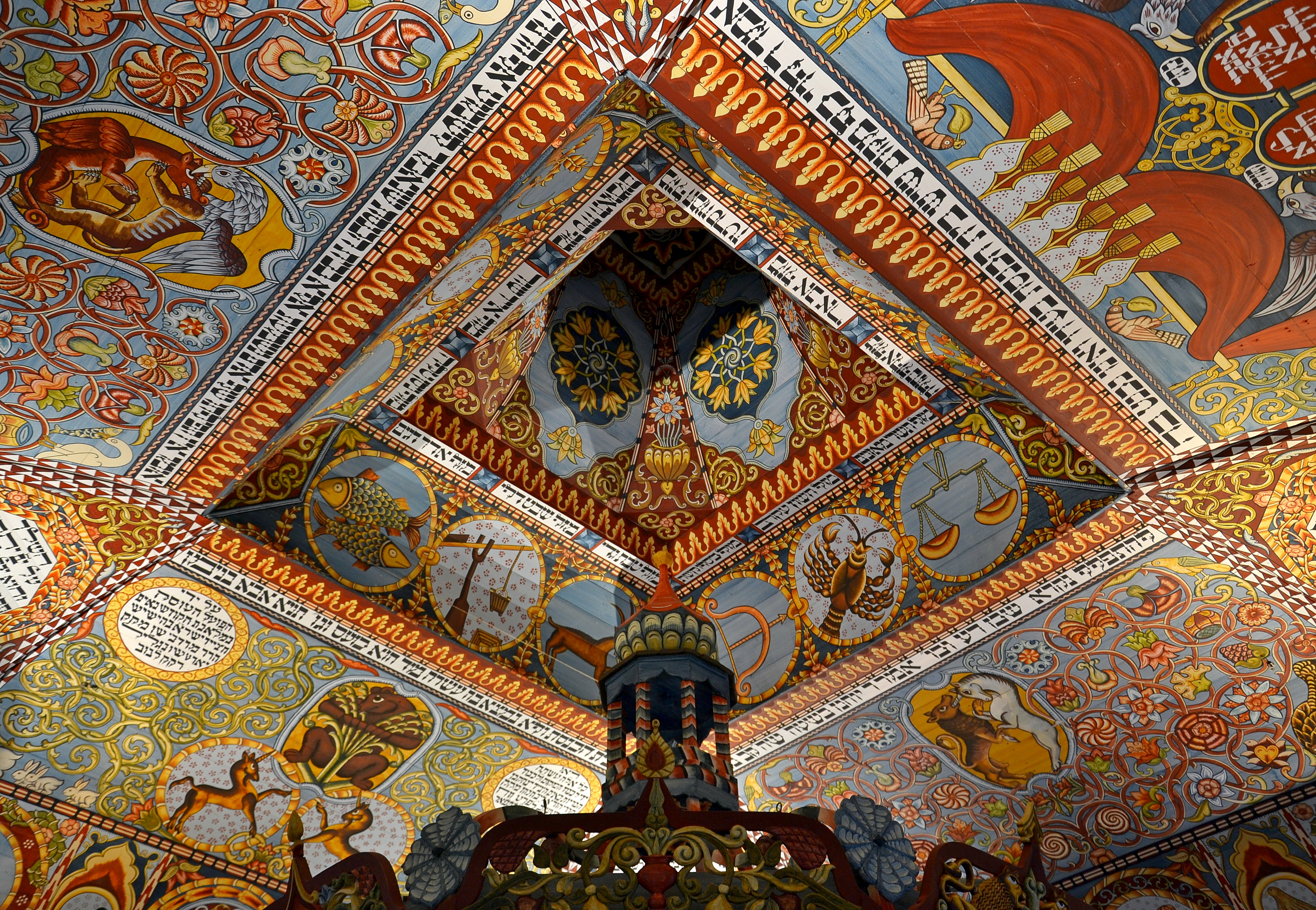
Reconstruction of the ceiling of the synagogue in Gwoźdźca, Poland, on display at the Museum of the History of Polish Jews in Warsaw.

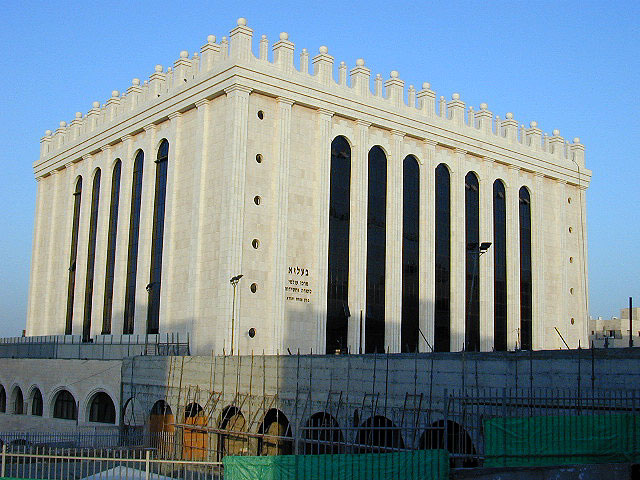
Belz Great Synagogue (2000), Jerusalem.

== Terminology ==
Due to the diasporic nature of Jewish history, there is no single architectural style that is common across all Jewish cultures. Examples of buildings considered Jewish architecture include explicitly religious buildings such as synagogues and mikvehs, as well as Jewish schools.

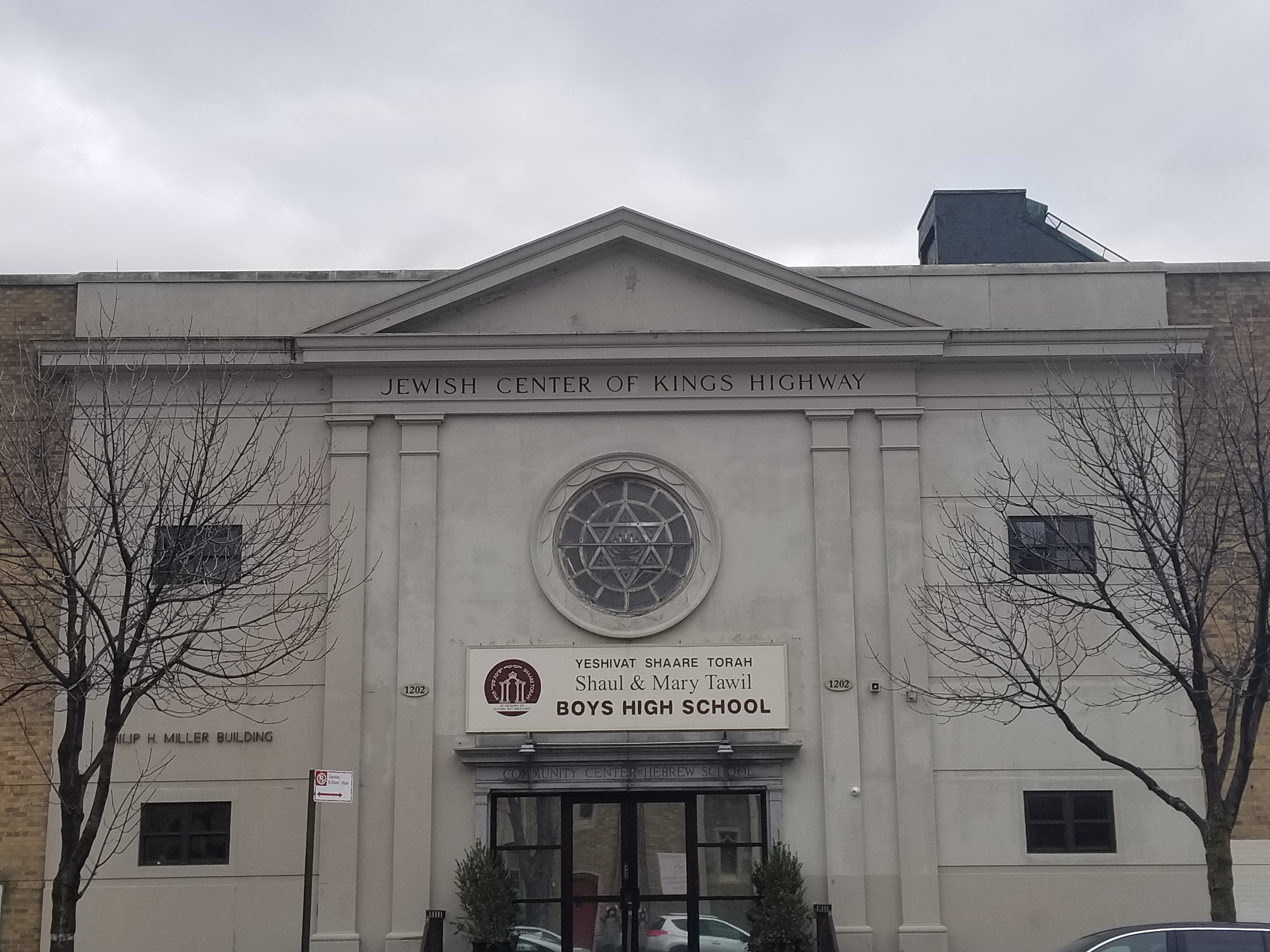
Jewish Center of Kings Highway boys' high school in Brooklyn, New York

== See also ==
- Synagogue architecture
- List of Jewish architects
- Jewish Architectural Heritage Foundation
- Sacral architecture
- Architecture of Israel
