= Peter Economy =

American author

- Born: Hamilton Air Force Base in Novato, California
- Education: Stanford University; Edinburgh Business School
- Occupations: Author, editor, ghostwriter, publishing consultant
- Website: petereconomy.com

Peter Economy is an American author, editor, and ghostwriter. Although his most-recent books tend to reside in the technology genre—particularly software product development and AWS/cloud—he has written books in a variety of other genres, including leadership, management, memoir, biography, consulting, how-to, entrepreneurship, marketing, sales, and a children's book. Economy is The Leadership Guy on Inc.com where he has published more than 1,500 articles on a variety of topics related to leadership, management, and other business topics.

Before that, he served as associate editor of Leader to Leader magazine for 18 years, working closely with Frances Hesselbein, Editor-in-Chief—at first under the auspices of the Peter F. Drucker Foundation for Nonprofit Management, and finally, the Frances Hesselbein Leadership Forum at Pitt University.

== Early life and education ==
The son of a U.S. Air Force officer, Economy was born at Hamilton Air Force Base in Novato, California. With family moves every four or five years, he spent his early life in Pennsylvania, California, Virginia, and Georgia, graduating from Warner Robins High School in Warner Robins, Georgia, and then Stanford University in Palo Alto, California with majors in Human Biology and Economics. During this time, he played French horn in school bands and the Macon (Georgia) Symphony Band before switching to electric guitar in local garage and rock bands.

== Writing ==
Economy is the author, editor, and ghostwriter of more than 125 books with sales of more than 3 million copies, including a Wall Street Journal bestseller. He has written about leadership and management for Leader to Leader, Gallup Business Journal, Inc.com, and Time (magazine).

He wrote his first book when, in 1989, he was asked by Dr. Bob Nelson, creator of Employee Appreciation Day, to write a book on the topic of negotiation for the publisher Scott Foresman. At the time, Economy was working as Administrative Manager for Horizons Technology, a San Diego–based software development firm. This first book, Negotiating to Win, was published in 1991, and its success eventually led Economy to abandon his management career to focus full time on writing business books and articles.

During his 18 years at Leader to Leader magazine, he worked closely with Frances Hesselbein, Editor-in-Chief, and with numerous business and academic leaders globally, providing editorial support to their articles. These leaders included Kiran Mazumar-Shaw, John Hope Bryant, Rosabeth Moss Kanter, Peter Senge, Juana Bordas, Jean Lipman-Blumen, Marshall Goldsmith, Inés Temple, Jeffrey L. Bowman, Lolly Daskal, Clifton Taulbert, Ron Wallace, and others.

Economy has also written for 1099, the magazine for independent professionals, and workWELL, a publication of Unum Group.

== Media ==
Economy has been featured in national newspapers as an expert in business.

- Huffington Post
- The Globe and Mail
- The San Diego Union-Tribune
- Mundo Ejecutivo
- Alto Nivel
- Business Matters (magazine)
- Nursing Management
- The Virginian-Pilot
- CareerBuilder
- Post-Tribune
- St. Louis Post-Dispatch
- IndustryWeek
- InfoWorld by International Data Group
- Network World by International Data Group
- San Jose Mercury News
- Alerus Financial

== Community initiatives and teaching ==
Economy is on the National Advisory Council of The Art of Science Learning, a National Science Foundation funded project that uses the arts to spark creativity in science education. He is also a founding member of the board of Sports for Exceptional Athletes, a nonprofit athletic organization that provides enhanced opportunities for people with and without disabilities.

Economy taught the upper-division course, Creativity and Innovation, at San Diego State University.

== Books ==
- Joel Tosi and Dion Stewart with Peter Economy (2023). Coaching for Learning: The Art and Practice. Dojo & Co. ISBN 979-8218120481.
- Lisa Rojany and Peter Economy (2022). Writing Children's Books For Dummies, 3rd Edition. For Dummies. 10 May 2022. ISBN 978-1119870012.
- Peter Economy, Eric Tyson, et al. (2022). Starting a Business All-in-One For Dummies, 3rd Edition. For Dummies. 12 April 2022. ISBN 978-1119868569.
- Kevin Daum, Janice Brewster, Peter Economy, and Anne Mary Ciminelli (2021). Building Your Custom Home For Dummies. For Dummies. 31 August 2021. ISBN 978-1119796794.
- Peter Economy (2021). Wait, I'm Working With Who?!? The Essential Guide to Dealing with Difficult Coworkers, Annoying Managers, and Other Toxic Personalities. Career Press. 2021. ISBN 978-1632651853.
- Peter Economy (2020). Wait, I'm the Boss?!? The Essential Guide for Managers to Succeed from Day One. Career Press. March 2020. ISBN 978-1632651648.
- Peter Economy, Eric Tyson, et al. (2019). Starting a Business All-in-One For Dummies, 2nd Edition. For Dummies. 29 May 2019. ISBN 978-1119565215.
- Abby Lee Miller with Peter Economy (2014). Everything I Learned about Life I Learned in Dance Class. (HarperCollins and William Morrow and Company). ISBN 9780062304889.
- Jeff Patton with Peter Economy (2014). User Story Mapping. (O'Reilly Media). ISBN 978-1-4919-0490-9.
- Dr. J. Robert Beyster with Peter Economy (2014). The SAIC Solution: Built by Employee Owners. (FED Productions). ISBN 978-1494930417.
- Raymond P. Davis with Peter Economy (2013). Leading Through Uncertainty: How Umpqua Bank Emerged from the Great Recession Better and Stronger than Ever. (Jossey-Bass and John Wiley & Sons). ISBN 978-1494930417.
- Peter Economy and Kathleen Allen (2013). Aging Parents: Helping Your Parents through Life's Transitions. (Common Sense Publishing). ASIN B00F785OMY.
- Kathleen Allen and Peter Economy (2013). Taking Charge: Design the Life You've Always Wanted. (Common Sense Publishing). ASIN B00F7KLP6G.
- Kathleen Allen and Peter Economy (2013). CEO Your Career: Design a Career with Options. (Common Sense Publishing). ASIN B00F7KD7B2.
- Peter Economy and Kathleen Allen (2013). More Money: How to Generate All the Income You'll Ever Need. (Common Sense Publishing). ASIN B00F7CHFHC.
- Lisa Rojany and Peter Economy (2012). Writing Children's Books For Dummies, 2nd Edition. (Wiley John Wiley & Sons). ISBN 978-1-118-35646-3.
- LTC Terry Hawn and Peter Economy (2012). Military Flight Aptitude Tests For Dummies. (Wiley John Wiley & Sons). ISBN 9780470600320.
- Patricia Ortlieb and Peter Economy (2011). Creating an Orange Utopia: Eliza Lovell Tibbets and the Birth of California's Citrus Industry. (Swedenborg Foundation Press). ISBN 978-0877853374..
