= Senator Skinner =

Senator Skinner may refer to:

- Alanson Skinner (1794–1876), New York State Senate
- Avery Skinner (1796–1876), New York State Senate
- Nancy Skinner (politician) (born 1954), California State Senate
- Pete Skinner (1942–2005), Florida State Senate
- Roger Skinner (1773–1825), New York State Senate
- Thomas Gregory Skinner (1842–1907), North Carolina State Senate
- Thomson J. Skinner (1752–1809), Massachusetts State Senate
- Timothy Skinner (fl. 1990s–2010s), Indiana State Senate
