= Forgiving Dr. Mengele =

2006 documentary film about Eva Mozes Kor

- Directed by: Bob Hercules; Cheri Pugh
- Release dates: February 24, 2006 (Gene Siskel Film Center in Chicago, Illinois)

Forgiving Dr. Mengele is a 2006 documentary film about Eva Mozes Kor, a survivor of the Holocaust, and Dr. Josef Mengele and his staff, who experimented on her and her twin sister Miriam Mozes. The documentary was directed by Bob Hercules and Cheri Pugh, who also served as producers. They followed Kor for over four years, chronicling her story, including her pilgrimage to Israel.

Forgiving Dr. Mengele premiered at the Gene Siskel Film Center in Chicago, Illinois, on February 24, 2006. It was scheduled to play for a week, and then travel to other cities in the US. The film is distributed by First Run Features, which handles independent films and documentaries.

== Eva Mozes Kor ==
Eva Mozes Kor and her sister Miriam were born on January 30, 1934, in Porț, Kingdom of Romania. In 1944, Nazis transported her immediate family to Auschwitz-Birkenau. Because Eva and Miriam were twins, Dr. Mengele selected them to remain alive for experiments.

After a 70-hour ride without food or water, Eva and Miriam, along with their mother, arrived at the selection platform. Eva gripped her mother's hand and looked around: her father and her two older sisters were nowhere in sight. She never saw them again. Soon the twin girls were ripped from their mother, whom they also never saw again.

Kor later recalled how she and her family arrived at the Auschwitz railhead:

When the doors to our cattle car opened, I heard SS soldiers yelling, "Schnell! Schnell!" (Quick!), and ordering everybody out. My mother grabbed Miriam and me by the hand. She was always trying to protect us because we were the youngest. Everything was moving very fast, and as I looked around, I noticed my father and my two older sisters were gone. As I clutched my mother's hand, an SS man hurried by shouting, "Twins! Twins!" He stopped to look at us. Miriam and I looked very much alike. "Are they twins?" he asked my mother. "Is that good?" she replied. He nodded yes. "They are twins," she said ... Once the SS guard knew we were twins, Miriam and I were taken away from our mother, without any warning or explanation. Our screams fell on deaf ears. I remember looking back and seeing my mother's arms stretched out in despair as we were led away by a soldier. That was the last time I saw her..

Eva and Miriam remained in Auschwitz for nine months, enduring experimentation such as being injected with potentially lethal strains of bacteria (and not given treatment). After World War II, they went to Romania and then immigrated to Israel. Eva served in the Israeli Army for ten years. After meeting a tourist who was a Holocaust survivor living in the United States, the two were married, and she moved to the US. In Terre Haute, Indiana, they raised a family and she became a successful realtor and created the C.A.N.D.L.E.S. Museum (Children of Auschwitz Nazi Deadly Lab Experiment Survivors). The museum is dedicated to education about the Holocaust and operates under the mission to "eliminate hatred and prejudice from our world." Eva Kor's husband, Michael, is a pharmacist, and her son, Alex, is active in the museum and education. He has made trips to Auschwitz on his mother's behalf and has documented these experiences.
