= Wooden Church, Porț =

Church in Sălaj County, Romania

- Biserica Înălțarea Domnului
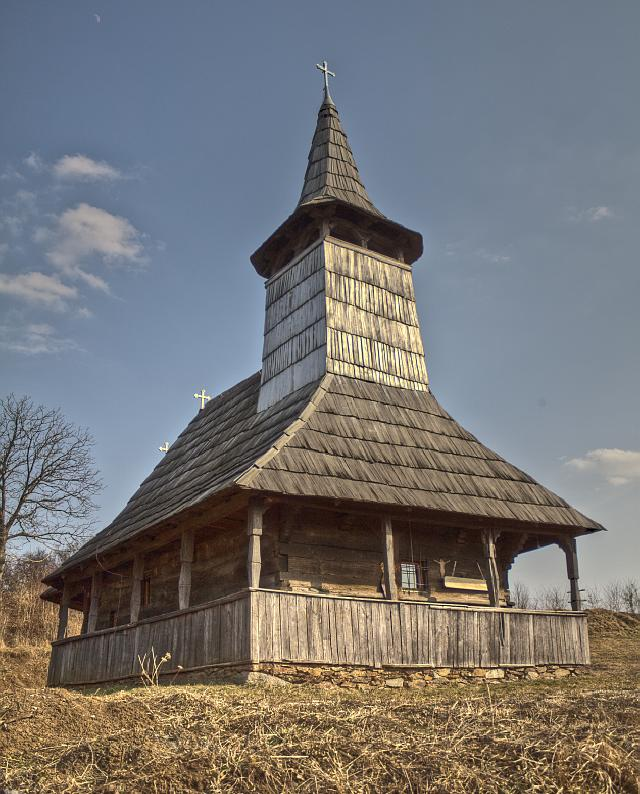

- Romania

Religion
- Affiliation: Catholic
- Region: Sălaj County
- Ecclesiastical or organizational status: parish church
- Year consecrated: 1792

Location
- Location: Porţ
- Municipality: Porţ
- State: Romania
- Interactive map of Wooden Church, Porț
- Coordinates: 47.216667°N 22.55°E

The Wooden Church (Romanian: Biserica Înălţarea Domnului) is a church in Porţ, Romania, built in 1792.

== Bibliography ==
- Cristache-Panait, Ioana (14 August 1978). „Biserica Înălțarea Domnului din Porț”. Monumente istorice bisericești din Eparhia Ortodoxă Română a Oradei. Biserici de lemn: 373–376, Oradea.
- Studii regionale Cristache-Panait, Ioana (14 August 1971). „Bisericile de lemn din Sălaj”. Buletinul Monumentelor Istorice 1971 (1): 31–40.
- Ghergariu, Leontin (14 August 1973). „Meșterii construcțiilor monumentale de lemn din Sălaj”. AMET 1971-73: 255–273, Cluj.
- Godea, Ioan (14 August 1996). Biserici de lemn din România (nord-vestul Transilvaniei). București: Editura Meridiane. ISBN 973-33-0315-1
