= Northern Transylvania Holocaust Memorial Museum =

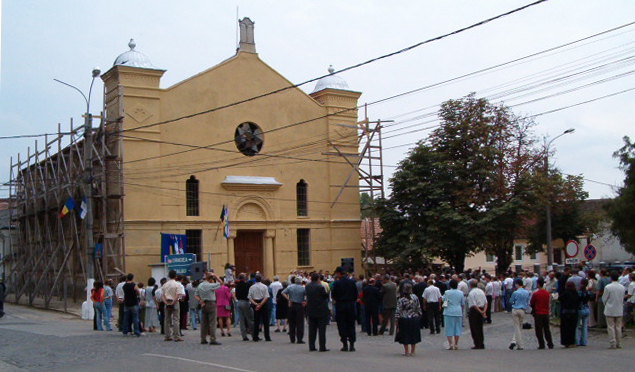
- Dedication Ceremony, September 11, 2005

- Location within Romania
- Alternative names: Șimleu Silvaniei Synagogue

General information
- Type: Religious, Institutional
- Location: Șimleu Silvaniei, Sălaj County, Romania
- Coordinates: 47.2302°N 22.8017°E
- Current tenants: Asociația Memorială Hebraică Nușfalău
- Completed: 1876
- Renovated: 2005
- Owner: Comunitatea Evreiască din Romania (founded by Mihaela Gross, Adam Aaron Wapniak, Alexander Hecht)

Renovating team
- Architect: Adam Aaron Wapniak
- Structural engineer: George Costea
- Main contractor: Rudolph Reinbold

References
- Daniel Stejeran, Museum Director

The Northern Transylvania Holocaust Memorial Museum (Romanian: Sinagoga din Șimleu Silvaniei) is located in Șimleu Silvaniei, Sălaj County, Romania, and was opened September 11, 2005. The museum is operated and maintained by the Jewish Architectural Heritage Foundation of New York and Asociația Memoraliă Hebraică Nușfalău (a Romanian NGO), with the support of the Claims Conference, Elie Wiesel National Institute for Studying the Holocaust in Romania, among other philanthropic and pedagogical partners.

== History ==
The old synagogue of Șimleu Silvaniei (Szilágysomlyó) was erected in 1876. During the height of its use, the synagogue was used for worship and religious ceremonies by Jewish families from the city of Șimleu Silvaniei, as well as surrounding villages such as Giurtelecu Șimleului (Somlyógyőrtelek) and Nușfalău (Szilágynagyfalu).

In May/June 1944, when the city was part of Hungary (as a consequence of the territorial agreement known as the Second Vienna Award), the area's Jewish population was forced out of their homes into the brutal Cehei ghetto and from there packed into cattle cars and transported to Auschwitz-Birkenau. Over 160,000 Jews from the region perished. Of those few remaining Jews who survived the Holocaust and remained in Romania (which, under the Paris Peace Treaties of 1947, regained Northern Transylvania), the last Jewish family emigrated from the region during the mid-1960s, while the country was still under Communist rule. The loss of its congregation left the Synagogue to fate, decaying silently over time.

Through the inspiration of Mihaela Gross, New York Architect Adam Aaron Wapniak became interested in the abandoned synagogue's restoration on a 2003 visit, sparking the interest of Alex Hecht, a New York dentist and son of Holocaust survivors Zoltan and Stefania Hecht, native to the nearby village of Nușfalău. Together, they launched a vigorous campaign driving the restoration project. Their efforts contributed to raising funds to complete construction, establishing educational criterion, and supported pedagogical training for the regional school systems. The Museum now functions as an educational hub and essential resource for Holocaust Education in the region. Guided tours tailored to students are offered daily by other students, a project started by Natalia Gross, who was a high school student when she began. The museum centerpiece is the synagogue originally built in 1876.

== Holocaust Education ==
Under communism, official history in Romania taught that Germans were the sole perpetrators of the Holocaust, thereby ignoring the role of the Romanian government in the deportation of hundreds of thousands of Jews and tens of thousands of Romani, from the historical regions of Bessarabia, northern Bukovina, and Transnistria, during World War II. After the fall of communism in 1989, wartime leader Ion Antonescu was semi-rehabilitated and hailed as a hero by some Romanians, with some monuments being erected across the country to honor the former dictator.

Following 15 years of setbacks, in November 2004, after the presentation of the Wiesel International Commission's report to the President of Romania, the country finally acknowledged in an official position the full dimensions of the Romanian Holocaust. Romanian authorities have begun efforts to educate the public about the Holocaust, it also banned pro-Nazi propaganda and the cult of war criminals. In March 2005, the newly elected government under President Traian Băsescu and Prime Minister Călin Popescu-Tăriceanu made a firm commitment to implement the Wiesel Holocaust Commission's recommendations on educating Romanians about the Holocaust and fighting racism in society.

Thus, the Romanian authorities have taken decisive steps towards the implementation of a unitary national curriculum concerning Holocaust education. (Although Holocaust education was introduced as a mandatory topic in pre-university curricula as of 1998, for a long time history textbooks have included little (if any), divergent, and often inaccurate information on the subject). Holocaust education has been mandatory in Romanian schools, covering 2–4 hours of material in the context of World War II. In 2004, Holocaust history also became an optional course. According to an ITF study, the three main obstacles for Holocaust education facing the Ministry of Education and Research in Romania are: lack of information on the topic, lack of diversity of information, and too few teachers trained to teach the topic.

This shift in policy paved the way for the Northern Transylvania Holocaust Memorial Museum to exercise its commitment to its educational program. In cooperation with the ministry of Education, the first ever Holocaust Education Olympiad was hosted at the Museum. In the Spring of 2008, the Museum inaugurated the Șimleu Silvaniei Multicultural Holocaust Education and Research Center; used to host lectures and seminars on the subject, with programs geared to students, teachers and academics. The teacher program encourages and helps teachers to sensitively incorporate the subject of the Holocaust into their curriculum, a discipline sorely lacking in Romania's school system.

== Gallery ==
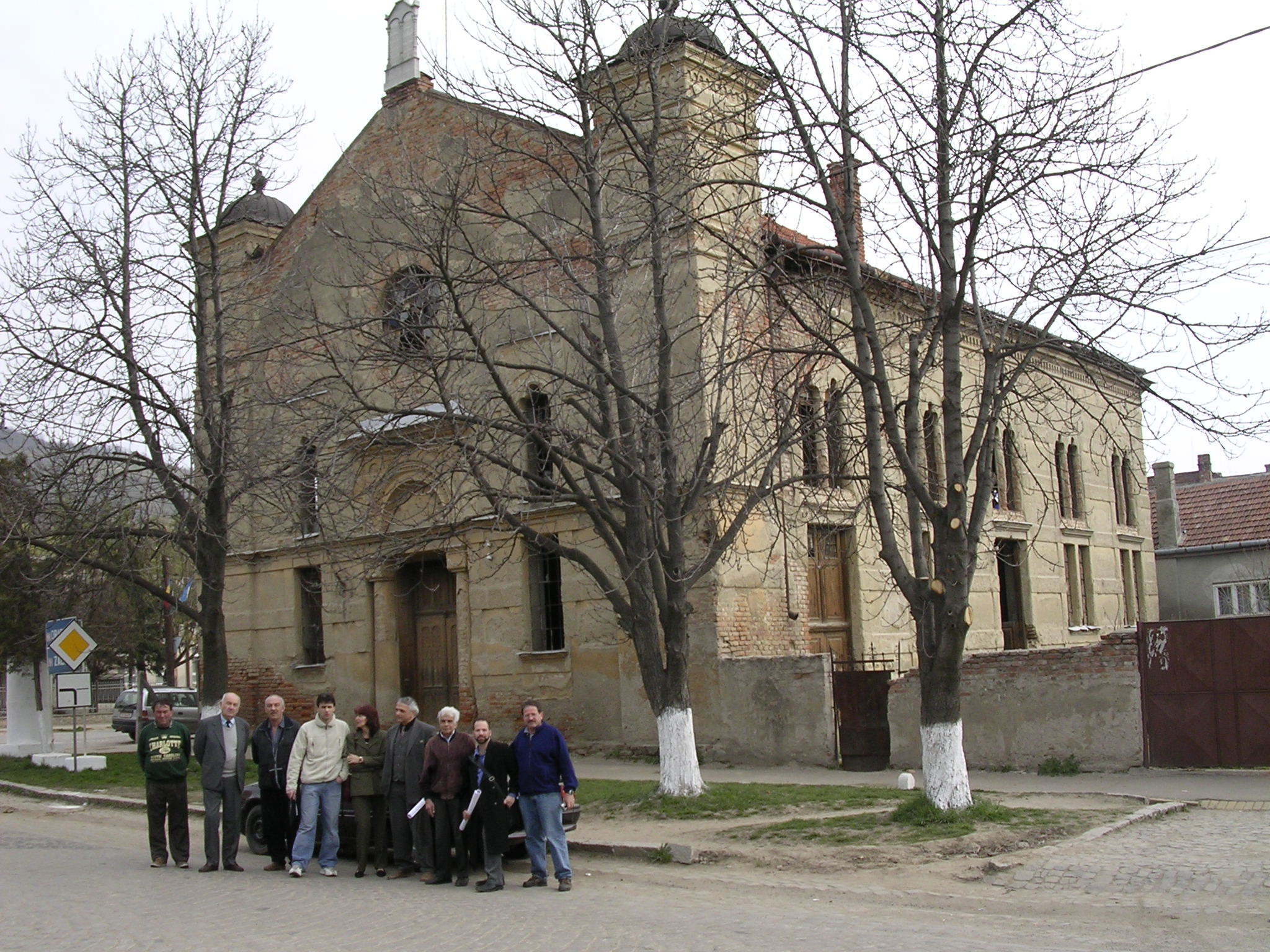
Original Project Team standing outside Synagogue building prior to construction

Winners of the Holocaust Olympiad hosted by the Museum in Șimleu Silvaniei

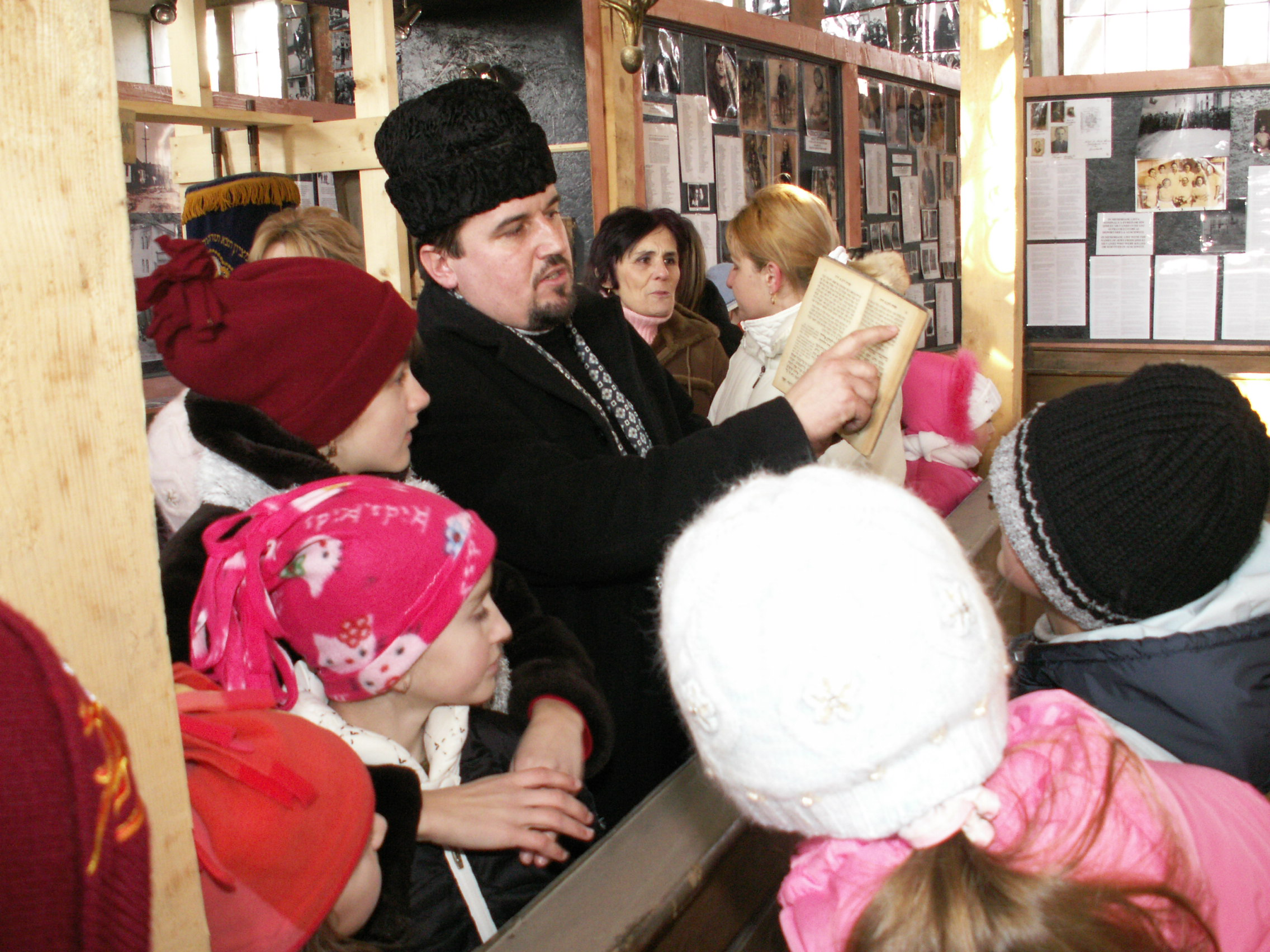
Teacher lecturing to his students at the Museum

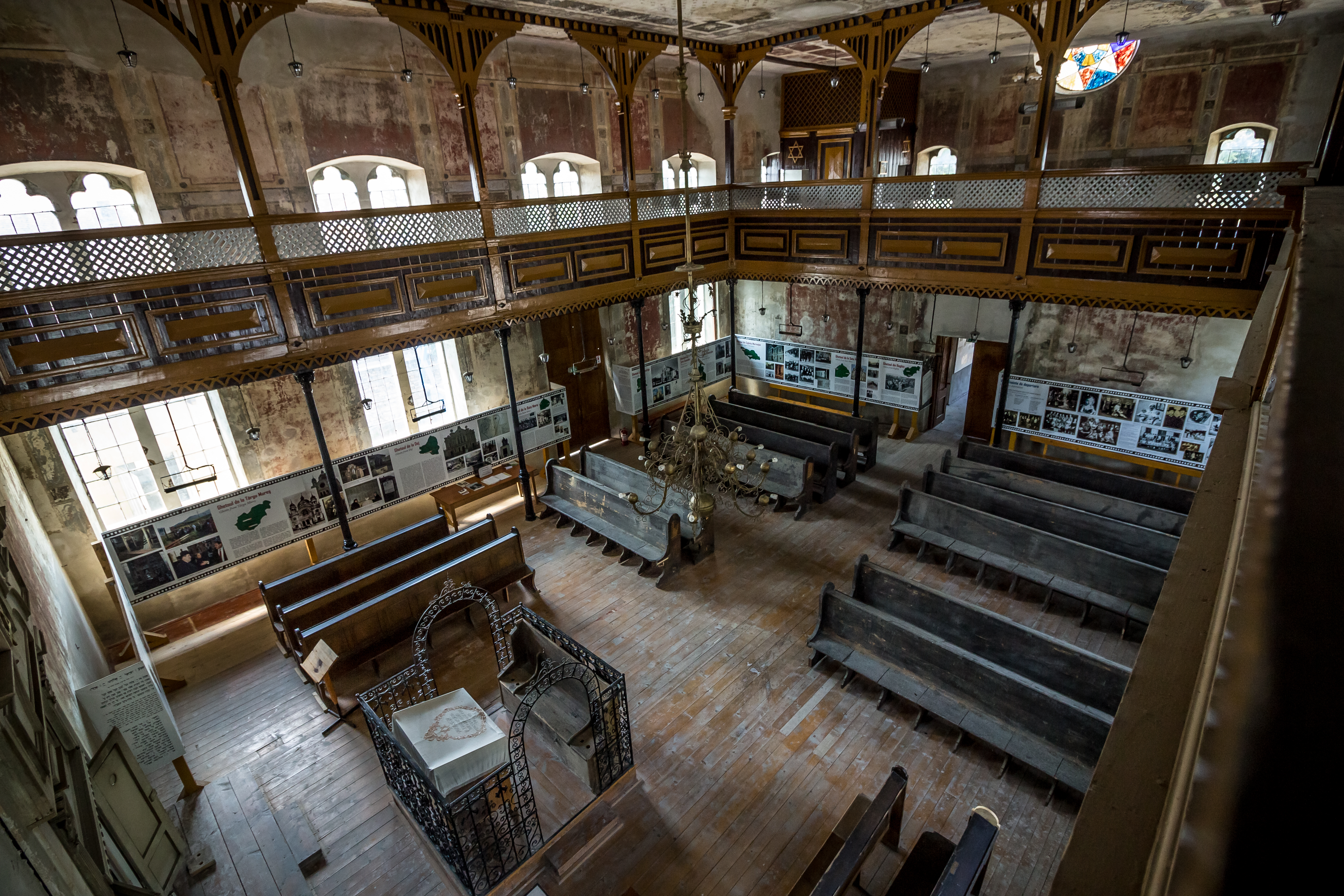
Museum interior (2016)

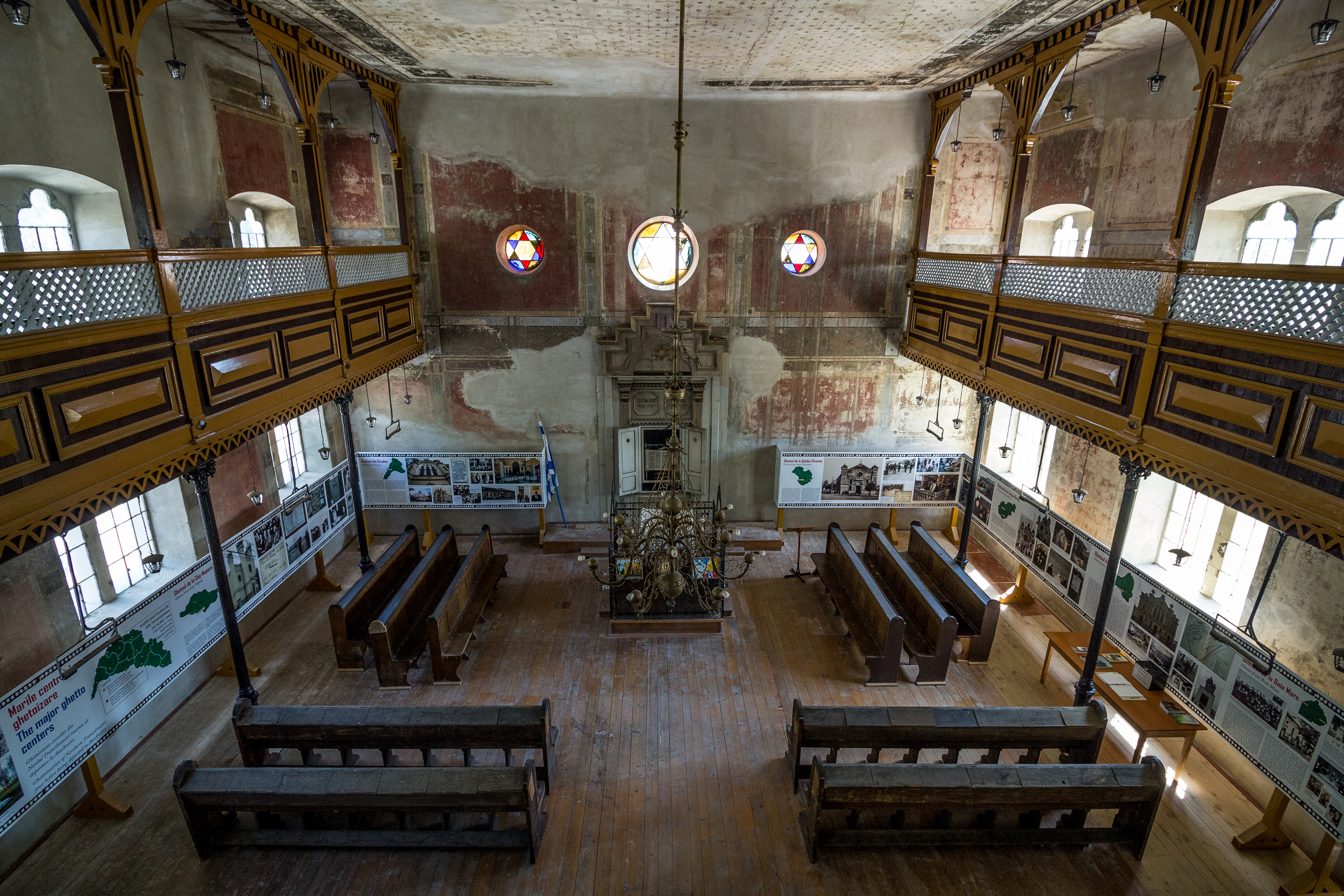
Museum interior (2016)

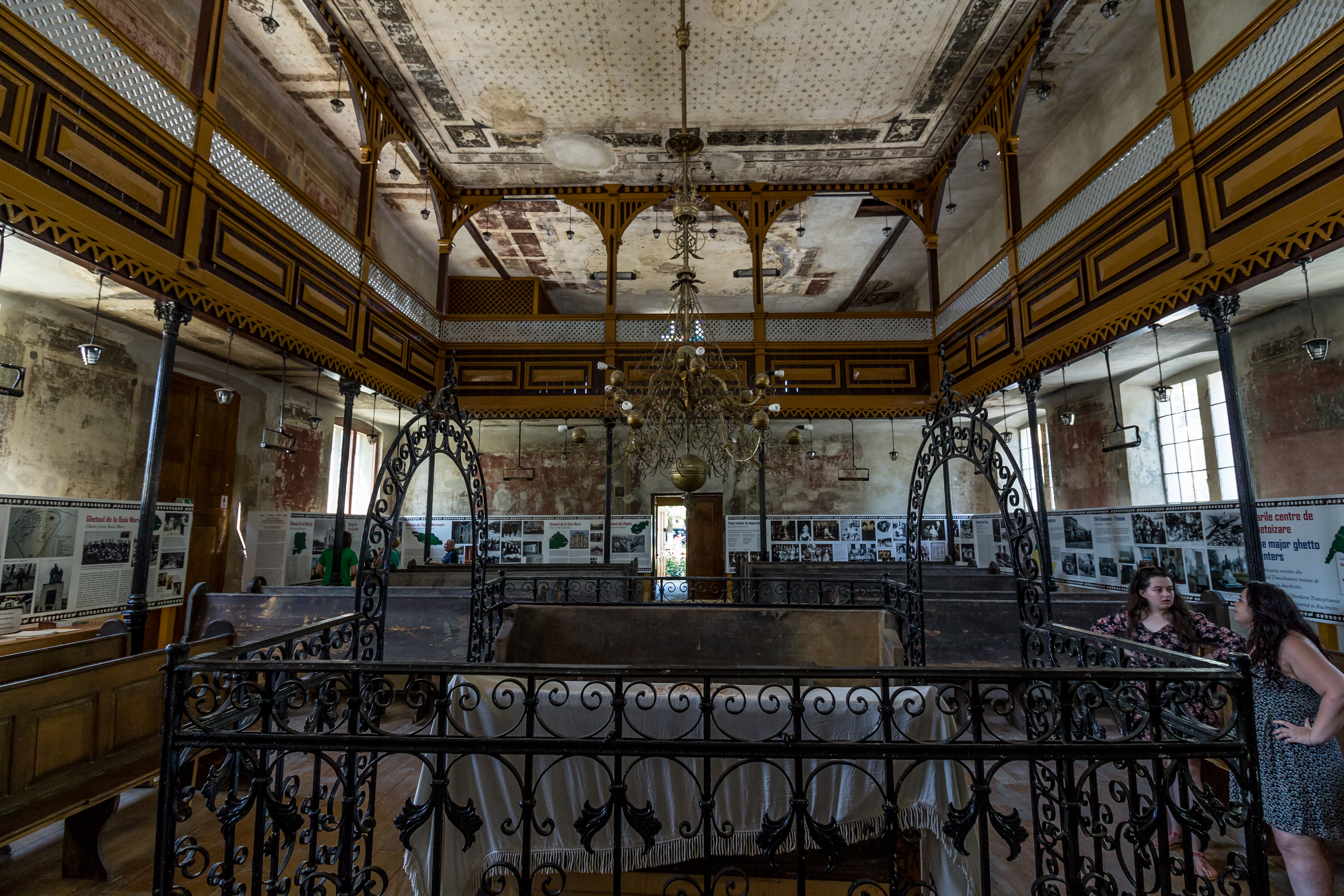
Museum interior (2016)

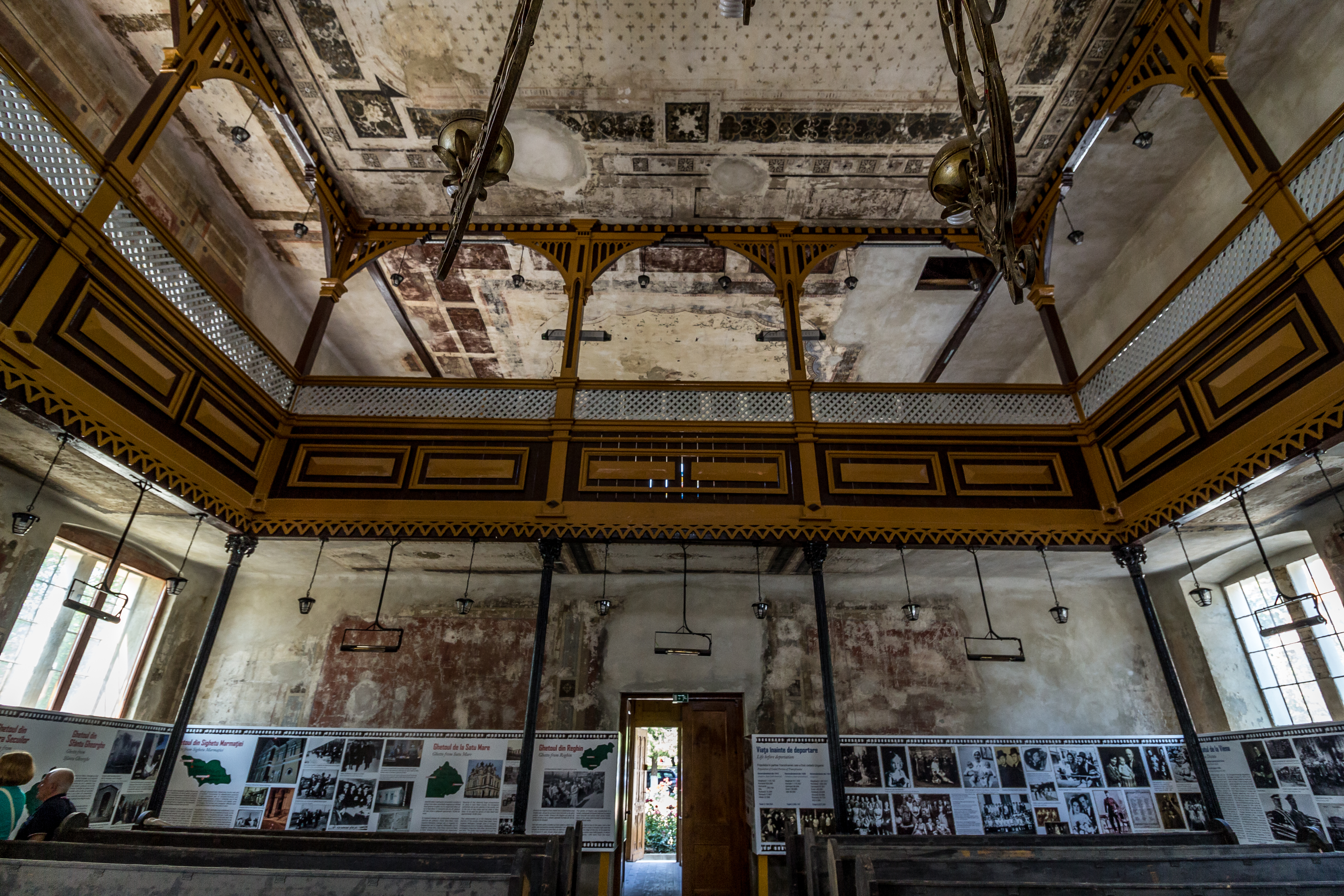
Museum interior (2016)

== See also ==
- History of the Jews in Romania
- List of synagogues in Romania
- Romanian People's Tribunals
- Presidential Commission for the Study of the Communist Dictatorship in Romania
