= Jon Ford (American politician) =

American politician

Member of the Indiana Senate from the 38th district
- In office 2014 – October 16, 2023
- Preceded by: Timothy Skinner
- Succeeded by: Greg Goode

Personal details
- Born: September 15, 1972 (age 53)
- Party: Republican
- Profession: Small business owner, manufacturer

Jonathan "Jon" Ford (born September 15, 1972) is a former Republican member of the Indiana State Senate, representing District 38 from 2014 to 2023.

== Early life ==
Ford was the president of All State Manufacturing. His main goal was to "focus on building the Wabash Valley's reputation as a quality place to study, work and live." Ford was a member of the Honey Creek Township. He was also the president of the Swope Art Museum and the Indiana Leadership Forum.

== Political career ==
In the 2014 general election, Ford won a surprise victory against Democratic incumbent Tim Skinner to serve in the Indiana Senate from the 38th district. District 38 consists of all of Vigo County and the upper portion of Clay County. As of the 2010 census, a total of 128,449 civilians reside within Indiana's 38th Senate District. During the 2015 Indiana General Assembly Session Ford was on the following committees; Family & Children Services, Homeland Security & Transportation, Public Policy, and Veterans Affairs & the Military

On September 15, 2023, it was announced that Ford would resign in October 2023.
