= Tonya Pfaff =

American politician

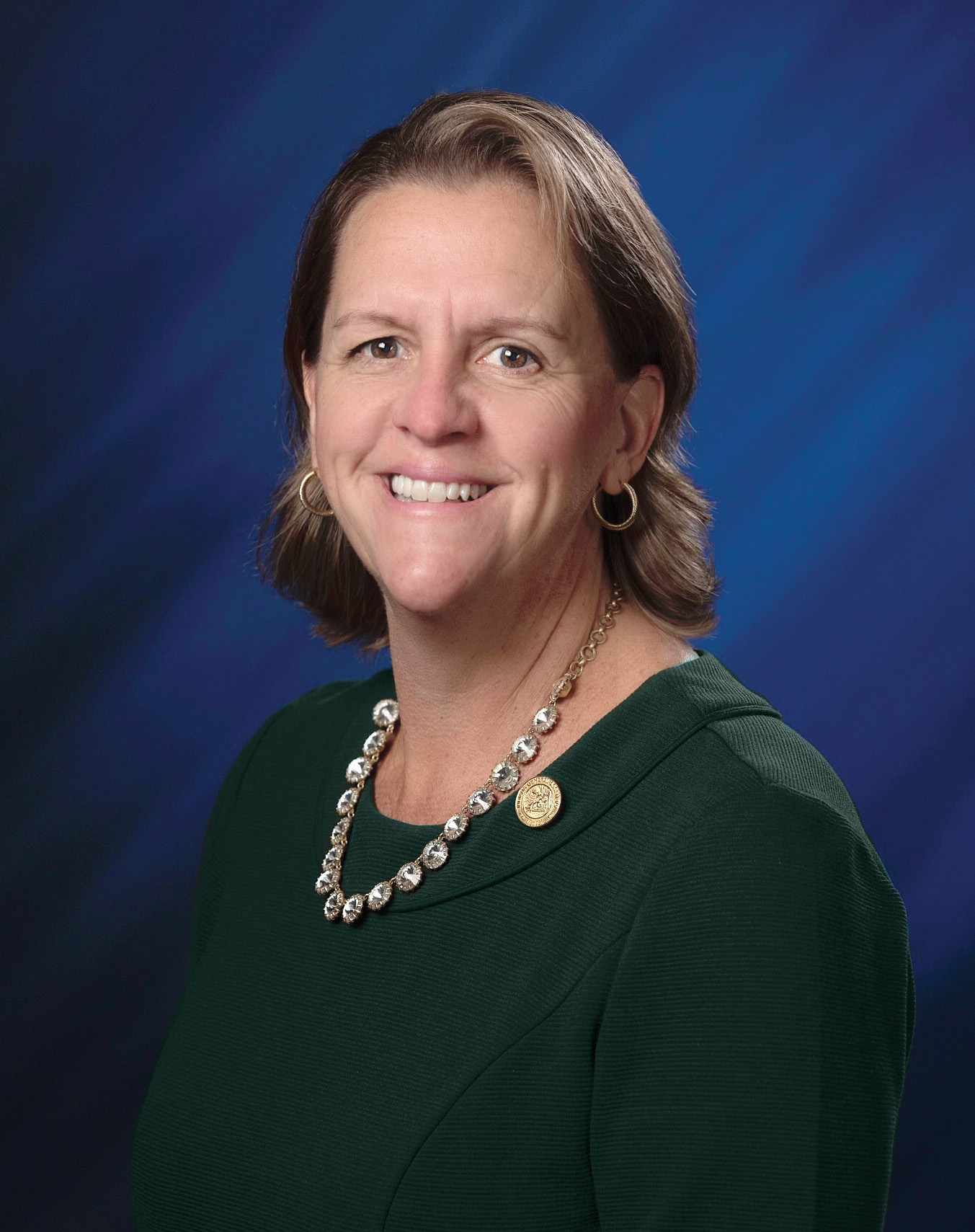

Member of the Indiana House of Representatives from the 43rd district
- Incumbent
- Assumed office November 7, 2018
- Preceded by: Clyde Kersey

Personal details
- Party: Democratic
- Spouse: Chris Pfaff
- Children: 4
- Education: Saint Mary-of-the-Woods College (BS); University of Oklahoma (MEd)
- Profession: Teacher, politician

Tonya Pfaff is an American politician and former educator who has served as the Democratic member of the Indiana House of Representatives for the 43rd District since 2018. She represents Terre Haute, West Terre Haute, and parts of Vigo County, and serves on several standing House committees including Ways and Means, Education, and Elections & Apportionment, where she is the ranking Democrat.

== Early life and education ==
Pfaff is a native of Terre Haute, Indiana. She attended local schools and earned a Bachelor of Science in Mathematics and Secondary Education from Saint Mary-of-the-Woods College, and a Master of Education in Curriculum and Supervision from the University of Oklahoma. Before entering politics, she worked for many years as a mathematics teacher in Vigo County schools.

== Career before politics ==
Pfaff spent much of her professional career as a public school teacher in Vigo County, teaching mathematics at the secondary level. Her experience in the classroom shaped her legislative priorities, particularly in education policy and school funding.

== Indiana House of Representatives ==
=== Elections ===
- 2018: Pfaff was elected to the Indiana House of Representatives, succeeding Democrat Clyde Kersey.
- 2020: Reelected, defeating Republican Bill Treadway.
- 2022: Reelected, defeating Republican Andrew McNeil.
- 2024: Reelected to another term unoppposed.

=== Committee assignments ===
Pfaff has served on several key House committees. In the 2023–24 legislative term, she was:

- Ranking Democrat, Elections & Apportionment Committee
- Member, Ways and Means Committee
- Member, Education Committee

=== Legislative priorities ===
Pfaff's legislative focus reflects her background as an educator. She has consistently supported proposals for increased K–12 education funding, local economic development initiatives, and family support measures.

== Personal life ==
Pfaff lives in Terre Haute with her husband, Chris Pfaff, and their children.
