= Elly Gross =

Romanian author (1929–2022)

Elly Berkovits Gross (February 14, 1929 – October 24, 2022) was a Holocaust survivor and author of several Holocaust related books of poetry and prose. In the 1960s, Elly emigrated to the United States, where she was a frequent invited speaker at museums and schools around the country. Gross died on October 24, 2022, at the age of 93

== Biography ==
Elly born in Șimleu Silvaniei, Romania to Eugene and Irina Berkovits. In 1944, her father was inducted by the invading Hungarian forces into a forced labor camp, where he perished on the Russian front. Elly and her remaining family, her mother and younger brother Adalbert, were taken to Cehei ghetto 'the day after Pesach' in 1944 along with most other Jews in Sălaj County. Six weeks later, her family, along with thousands of other Jews were transported via cattle cars to Auschwitz concentration camp. She was separated from her mother and brother, and never saw either again. Elly credits her survival of the camp to 'miracles', noting that few others of her age group survived the ordeal.

Elly was transferred to Fallersleben, a part of the Neuengamme concentration camp, where she performed slave labor for Volkswagen until she was liberated at Salzwedel by the Allies on April 14, 1945. Elly returned to her home town, where she soon married family friend Ernest Gross. They have two children and five grandchildren, who also reside in the United States. Elly graduated from LaGuardia Community College with an associate degree in Fine Arts in 1993 at the age of 64.

== Works ==
- 'Poems of Elly Gross: Memories of a Holocaust Survivor.'
- 'Storm against the Innocents and other stories'
- 'Elka's Growing Up in a Changing World' (Book and DVD)
- 'Elly: My True Story of the Holocaust'
- 'Of Miseries and Miracles: The Holocaust Testimonial of Elly Berkovits Gross' (DVD only)
- 'Vanished World: A Memoir of Ernest'

Several of these works have been translated into Spanish and Romanian.
