= Marca, Sălaj =

Marca
- Commune
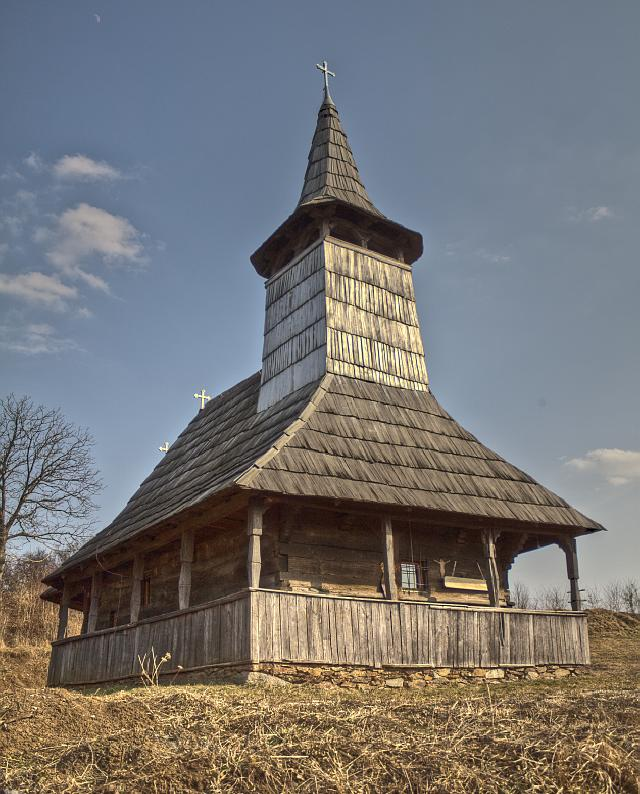
- Wooden church in Porț

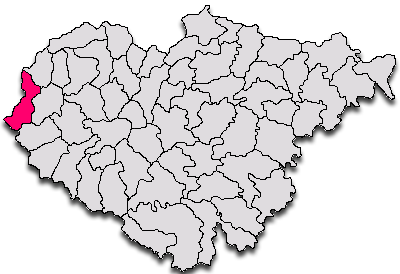
- Location in Sălaj County

- Location in Romania
- Coordinates: 47°13′N 22°34′E
- Country: Romania
- County: Sălaj

Government
  - Mayor (2020–2024): Ioan Șumălan (PNL)
- Area: 48.37 km^{2} (18.68 sq mi)
- Elevation: 183 m (600 ft)
- Population (2021-12-01): 2,226
  - Density: 46.02/km^{2} (119.2/sq mi)
- Time zone: UTC+02:00 (EET)
  - Summer (DST): UTC+03:00 (EEST)
- Postal code: 457230
- Area code: +(40) 0260
- Vehicle reg.: SJ
- Website: marcasj.ro

Marca (Hungarian: Márkaszék) is a commune located in Sălaj County, Crișana, Romania. It is composed of five villages: Leșmir (Lecsmér), Marca, Marca-Huta (Bulyovszkytelep), Porț (Porc), and Șumal (Somály).

== Sights ==
- Wooden church of Porț, constructed 1792

== Natives ==
- Eva Mozes Kor (1934–2019), activist and Holocaust survivor from Porț
