= CANDLES Holocaust Museum and Education Center =

Holocaust museum in Terre Haute, Indiana

- Location within Indiana
- Established: 1995
- Location: Terre Haute, Indiana
- Coordinates: 39.4657°N 87.4073°W
- Type: History museum
- Directors: Eva Mozes Kor (Founding Director); Kiel Majewski (Executive Director)
- Website: http://www.candlesholocaustmuseum.org

CANDLES Holocaust Museum and Education Center ("Children of Auschwitz Nazi Deadly Lab Experiments Survivors") is a museum in Terre Haute, Indiana, which educates the public about the Holocaust. It is the only Holocaust museum in the state of Indiana. The museum was founded by Holocaust survivor Eva Mozes Kor, who with her twin sister Miriam was subjected to human experimentation under Josef Mengele at Auschwitz. The museum tells the story of the genocide from Kor's perspective. It has been the center of controversy due to Kor's belief that Nazis should be forgiven for the crimes of the Holocaust as a way for Jews to free themselves from victimization. It was firebombed by an unknown arsonist in 2003, and reopened two years later.

== See also ==
- List of museums in Indiana
- List of Holocaust memorials and museums in the United States
