= Clyde Kersey =

American politician

Member of the Indiana House of Representatives from the 43rd district
- In office November 6, 1996 – November 7, 2018
- Preceded by: John Kimmel
- Succeeded by: Tonya Pfaff

Personal details
- Born: November 4, 1937 (age 88) Terre Haute, Indiana
- Party: Democratic
- Spouse: Susie
- Education: Indiana State University Indiana University
- Profession: Educator

Clyde R. Kersey (born 4 November 1937) is a former Democratic member of the Indiana House of Representatives, representing the 43rd District from 1996 to 2018. He is also a former member of the Vigo County Council from 1999 to 2004. In 2017, Kersey announced that he would not run for reelection to the State House.
