= Inés Temple =

Peruvian businesswoman and author (born 1959)

Ines Temple
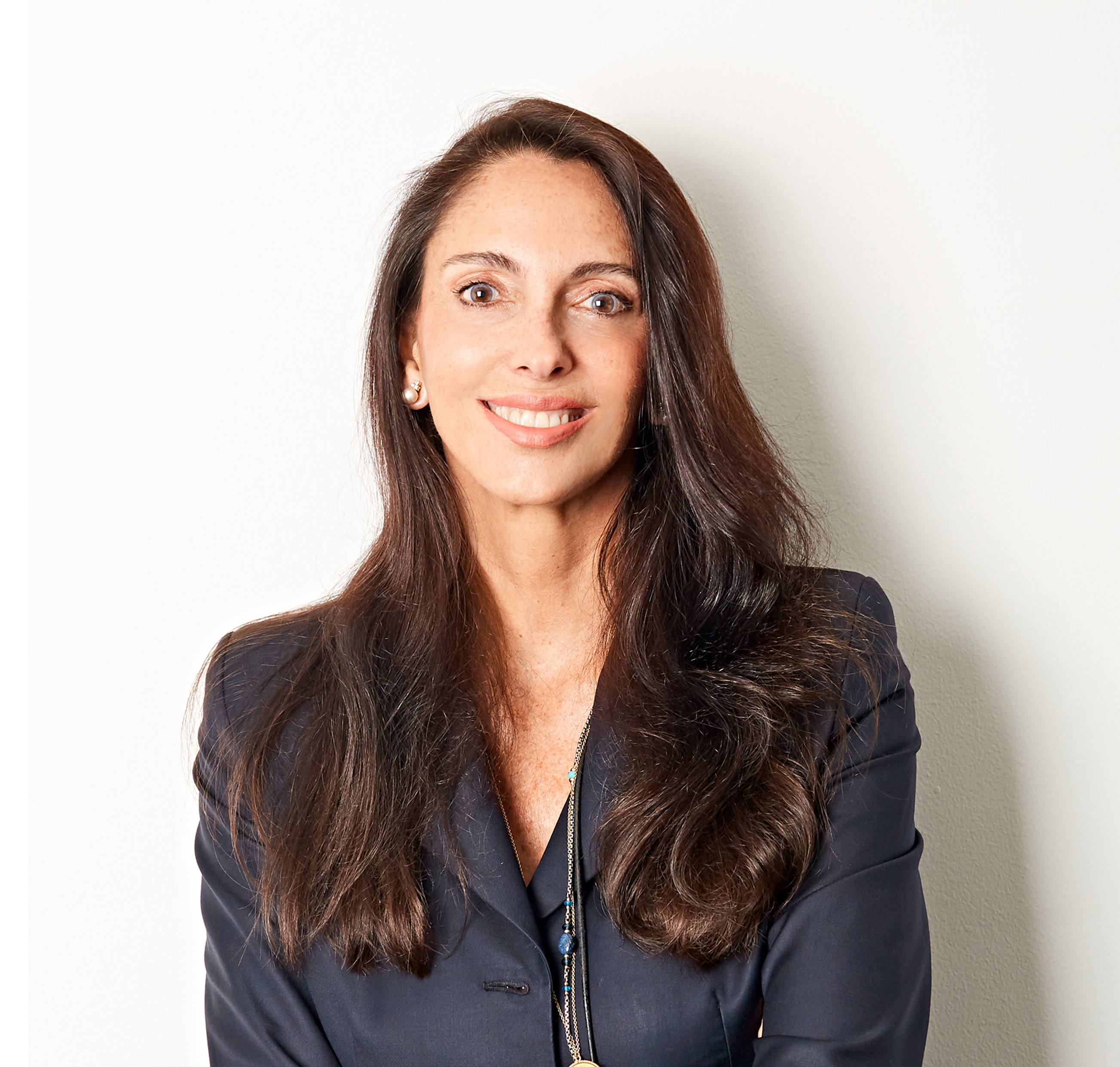
- Born: 20 January 1959 (age 66); Lima, Peru
- Education: Colegio Santa Úrsula, Lima
- Alma mater: New York University (BSBA)
- Occupations: CEO LHH-DBM Peru & LHH Chile
- Known for: seting up the Peruvian branch of Drake Beam Morin, a human resources company
- Children: 3
- Parents: Alejandro Temple Sanchez-Checa (father); Nelly Amelia Arciniaga Rojas (mother)

Ana Ines Amelia Temple Arciniega (born 20 January 1959) is a Peruvian businesswoman and author.

== Family and education ==
Temple is the daughter of Alejandro Temple Sanchez-Checa and Nelly Amelia Arciniaga Rojas. She was educated at Colegio Santa Úrsula, Lima. She has a BS in business administration from New York University in New York City, and an MBA from the Adolfo Ibañez School of Management in Miami, Florida. She has 3 children.

== Career ==
Temple set up the Peruvian branch of Drake Beam Morin, a human resources company, in 1993. In 2011, Drake Beam Morin was acquired by Adecco and merged with its existing Lee Hecht Harrison subsidiary.

Temple wrote Usted S.A - Empleabilidad & Marketing Personal in 2010; it has gone through several editions and was among the top selling books in Perú for 2013.

Temple has chaired the board of directors of Perú2021.
