= Timothy Skinner =

American politician

Member of the Indiana Senate from the 38th district
- In office 2002–2014
- Preceded by: Mark J. Blade
- Succeeded by: Jon Ford

Personal details
- Party: Democratic
- Spouse: Mary Lou
- Education: Indiana State University
- Profession: Social Studies Education Politician

Timothy D. "Tim" Skinner is a former teacher and a Democratic politician in Indiana who served three terms in the Indiana Senate.

Skinner earned his B.A. and M.A. in Secondary Education from Indiana State University. He taught economics, government, and geography at West Vigo High School in West Terre Haute until his retirement in 2011.

Skinner represented the 38th Senate District from 2002 to 2014, when he lost to Jon Ford in the general election. He was the 2016 Democratic nominee for the Indiana House of Representatives, District 42. He lost to the incumbent, Alan Morrison. Previously an Otter Creek Township, Vigo County, Indiana Precinct Committeeman, he also has served on the Vigo County Council (1999–2004).
