= Cehei ghetto =

Coordinates: 47.233333°N 22.8°E

The Cehei ghetto, also known as the Șimleu Silvaniei ghetto, was one of the Nazi-era ghettos for European Jews during World War II. It was located outside Szilágysomlyó in the village of Somlyócsehi, Szilágy County, Kingdom of Hungary (Romanian: Cehei, today part of Șimleu Silvaniei, Sălaj County, Romania) as the territory became part of Hungary again from the 1940 Second Vienna Award's grant of Northern Transylvania until the end of World War II. It was active in the spring of 1944, following Operation Margarethe.

== History ==
Romania's 1930 census found some 14,000 Jews living in Sălaj County, but this number had fallen to 8,000 by 1944. In 1942 and 1943, the county's male Jews aged 16 to 60 had been sent to perform forced labor on the Eastern Front, on the Ukrainian border, accounting for the fall in population. Thus, those sent to the ghetto were women, children, the elderly and the sick. The decision to set it up was taken at a conference held in Szatmárnémeti (Satu Mare) on April 26, attended by András Gazda, assistant to the county prefect; János Sréter, mayor of Zilah (Zalău); József Udvari, mayor of Szilágysomlyó (Șimleu Silvaniei); lieutenant colonel György Mariska, commander of the county's gendarmerie unit; Ferenc Elekes, chief of police of Zilah (Zalău); and István Pethes, his counterpart in Szilágysomlyó (Șimleu Silvaniei). The ispán of the county, Baron János Jósika, immediately resigned upon being informed of the conference's decisions by his assistance, holding the planned course of action to be immoral and illegal. His successor László Szlávi, sent by the Döme Sztójay, fully cooperated with the program. Following the officials' return from Szatmárnémeti (Satu Mare), discussions took place in the prefect's office among local officials regarding the ghetto's physical location.

In Szilágysomlyó (Șimleu Silvaniei), the Jews were rounded up under the direct command of István Pethes; in Zilah (Zalău), by Ferenc Elekes; in the rest of the county, under orders from András Gazda and the direct supervision of György Mariska. Among the larger communities affected were those at Tasnád (Tășnad) and Kraszna (Crasna). The Jews were forced to live on the precincts of the Klein brick factory in Somlyócsehi (Cehei), in a swampy and muddy area some 5 km distant from the center of Szilágyosmlyó (Șimleu Silvaniei). At its peak, there were nearly 8,500 inhabitants, including Jews from the districts of Kraszna, Szilágycseh, Zsibó, Szilágysomlyó, Alsószopor, Tasnád and Zilah.

As the brick shelters could not accommodate everyone, many ghetto residents had to live outside. Security was provided by a special gendarmerie unit from Budapest commanded by Krasznai, a man noted for his cruelty. He practiced constant humiliation of the Jews; in one incident, he led them to the ghetto fence, where they excreted onto a field. He ordered their picture taken, blowing it up and placing it in a shop window in town, with the legend, "this is the lesson of the yids in the Cehei ghetto". At other times, Jews would be forced up a hill, some of them savagely beaten in order to obtain information about where their valuables were hidden. Those watching the beatings were also expected to reveal what they knew.

Conditions in the ghetto were such as to keep inhabitants barely alive during the three to four weeks they spent there. Due to physical torture, lack of food and of water, the Jews of Szilágyság (Sălaj) reached Auschwitz concentration camp in particularly poor shape, so that an unusually high percentage were selected for the gas chambers immediately upon arrival. The deportations from Somlyócsehi (Cehei) took place in three transports: May 31 (3,106), June 3 (3,161) and June 6 (1,584), with a total of 7,851 Jews sent to Auschwitz. Some 1,200 Jews survived the Holocaust but later emigrated from Romania, so that by the 2000s, under fifty Jews remained in the county.

== See also ==
- Northern Transylvania Holocaust Memorial Museum
