= Tuhutum Monument =

Obelisk in Zalău, Romania

Coordinates: 47.182042°N 23.051805°E

- Monumentul Tuhutum; Tuhutum-emlékmű
- Interactive map of Tuhutum Monument
- Location: Strada Crinului, Zalău, Romania
- Designer: János Fadrusz
- Type: Obelisk
- Material: bronze, stone
- Height: 3.5 m (11 ft)
- Opening date: 18 September 1902
- Dedicated to: Tuhutum, a commander mentioned in the Gesta Hungarorum

The Tuhutum Monument (Romanian: Monumentul Tuhutum; Hungarian: Tuhutum-emlékmű) was an obelisk in Zalău, Romania.

== History ==
The monument was conceived by János Fadrusz after the suggestion of Lajos Szikszai, and opened on September 18, 1902, in the same day with the Wesselényi Monument. It depicted the arrival of the Hungarians, when Tuhutum jumped off his horse and stabbed his spear into the ground symbolizing the landtaking. A turul was also on the top of the monument. The obelisk was located in a park named after Lajos Szikszai, situated between Zalău City Hall and Zalău River. The park was replaced by a parking area. The monument was destroyed during Communist Romania, in a night of the summer of 1968.

Only a copy of the turul situated on the top of the obelisk was completed in 2008 and placed in the yard of the Reformed Church, Zalău. The obelisk is going to be placed in Iuliu Maniu Square, in Zalău.
