= Szilágy =

Szilágy may refer to:

- Szilágy County, a historic administrative county.
- Szilágy (village), village in Hungary.
- Szilágy (newspaper)
