= György Zoványi =

Zoványi Pipis György
- Born: 1656
- Died: 1758; Zilah
- Occupation: minister

Zoványi Pipis György (1656–1758) was a Hungarian bishop of Debrecen, involved in the Kuruc uprising.

He served at the Reformed Church, Zalău after 1712. His house is one of the oldest one from Zalău. On 9 November 1714, Charles XII of Sweden rested for a night in Zalău at the house of György Zoványi, as indicates a board on the house.
