= Limes (Romanian magazine) =

- Categories: Editorial magazine
- Frequency: quarterly
- Publisher: The Sălaj County Culture Inspectorate, Zalău
- First issue: 1998
- Final issue: 2001
- Country: Romania
- Language: Romanian, Hungarian
- ISSN: 1454-0819

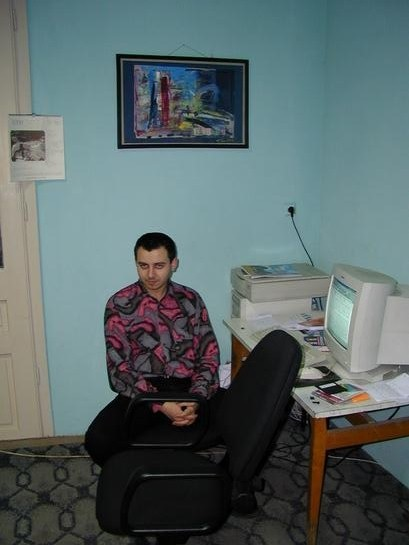
A redactor of Limes, Vasile Florin Mirghesiu, PhD (1972-), is working on the last issue, in the Újvárosi house, Zalău, in 2001

Limes was a Romanian quarterly literary and political magazine, issued by the Sălaj County Culture Inspectorate. It was a bilingual publication, in Romanian, and Hungarian. The magazine was printed between 1998 and 2001.

In 2001, "Limes was seen by Adevărul literar și artistic as the most solid book magazine, literally and figuratively, that appears in the counties" of Romania

Limes has made significant impact in its field. According to România Liberă daily newspaper, "Limes quarterly magazine, edited by the county's Culture Inspectorate, appeared in Zalău. It is signed by Romanian and Hungarian cultural figures. A rich and interesting, lively and polemical content. Worth reading." It was "the only culture magazine of Sălaj". (1998–2001)

Limes was a bilingual magazine. According to Ziua daily newspaper, "one sixth of the editorial space is reserved for materials on the Hungarian community. The editors of the magazine are the Sălaj Culture Inspectorate and the Sălaj Center for the Conservation and Valorization of Tradition and Popular Creation". "One sixth of the magazine is affected by the Hungarian language culture represented by Katona Szabolcs, Fejér László, Kocs Kovács István, Gáspar Attila, Nyrő József."

According to Adevărul daily newspaper, Limes magazine was initiated by the leader of the Sălaj County Culture Inspectorate, Cornel Grad. "The Consultative Board includes first-rate names of the Sălaj culture, having the contribution of collaborators from abroad". The magazine was led by Cornel Grad, a remarkable personality of Sălaj County.

"Adevărul literar și artistic consecrated, under the signature of Constantin Stănescu, entire pages of each issue of the magazine" Limes.

The magazine had a significant impact in Sălaj Country. Limes was "an exceptional magazine, written for all citizens of this county and not only," wrote Graiul Sălajului, the county's most circulated newspaper. "Limes is a magazine for the entire Romanian space and for the neighboring ones"

Limes had a "national and international distribution". The magazine had a significant impact in the cultural field of Sălaj Country. All personalities and institution of Sălaj County were involved in the publication of Limes. The issues of Limes were "edited at the "Sălaj County Culture Inspectorate, in association with the Center of Popular Creation, Sălaj". Limes exceed the readers' expectations. "Limes became an independent magazine" A commentary on the work of Karl Popper, "In Search of a Better World", was signed by Dr. Vasile Florin Mirghesiu, in no. 4/1998.

The magazine was illustrated by remarkable artists from Sălaj Country. Limes magazine had "the graphic illustration of Szatmári József and Szabó Vilmos, used the photographs of Nicolae Gozman and Silviu Gheție of the Collections of the Zalău Museum of History and Art as well as the National Archives in Sălaj. Cover I and IV were illustrated works by Viorel Nimigeanu". An issue of Limes "was dedicated to sculptor Victor Gaga" (1930–2003).

"Lime at its best" headlined the weekly newspaper Repere Transilvane, on July 13, 1999.

An important component of Limes were historical studies and commentaries. The study "A century of ideology in Zalău" was published by Vasile Florin Mirghesiu, PhD, in no 3-4/1999. A commentary on François Furet's book, La Révolution en débat, was published by Vasile Florin Mirghesiu, in no. 3-4/2000. In the same issue, Dr. Mirghesiu wrote on the history books of Camil Mureșanu, Teodor Pavel (1941–2017), Tony Judt, Vasile Pușcaș, Nicolae Iuga, Doru E. Goron (1955–2005), Danut Pop (1961-), Ioan Ciocian (1948-).

Redactors were: Cornel Grad (1949-), Vasile Florin Mirghesiu, PhD (1972-), Fejér László (1939–2018), György Györfi-Deák (1964-), Simone Györfi (1961-), Gheorghe Șișeștean (1954–2012), Viorel Tăutan (1943-). In issue 3-4 (11–12), year 3, 2000, the longest article, "Piloni ai Romaniei moderne: Vasile Stoica in S.U.A. (1917-1918)", pp. 69–108, was signed by Vasile Florin Mirghesiu. The continuation of the Mirghesiu"s article is in the next issue, 1-2 (13–16), year 4, 2001: "Vasile Stoica in S.U.A. (1919-1920)", pp. 19–42. Vasile Florin Mirghesiu's PhD thesis is titled "Vasile Stoica, political thinker and diplomat" Limes has had regular and significant usage as a citation in academic works. The redactors worked in the Újvárosi house, Zalău, where the Sălaj County Culture Inspectorate was located. Inhabited by Újvárosi family in the 19 and 20 century, the downtown Zalău house has been a cultural centre and library, since it was nationalised in 1960.

The magazine published original literature and literary commentary. A commentary on Milan Kundera books, "De ce politica si istoria sunt urate?", was published by Dr. Vasile Florin Mirghesiu, in issue 3-4/1999.

Limes had a significant impact in cultural life in Transylvania. On July 15, 2000, in Baia Mare, a special issue of Limes magazine was published, in collaboration with Archeus cultural magazine of Maramureș County. The article "About the rise and fall of Greater Romania" and a commentary, "The national project", on Lucian Boia book was published by Dr. Vasile Florin Mirghesiu in the volume Limes-Archens. "The volume Limes-Archens is an achievement conceived by a collective of scholars whose first violin is Cornel Grad, PhD, with indisputable merits in the cultural life of Sălaj Country". In 2001, was printed the last issue of Limes magazine.
