= Zalău =

- Municipality
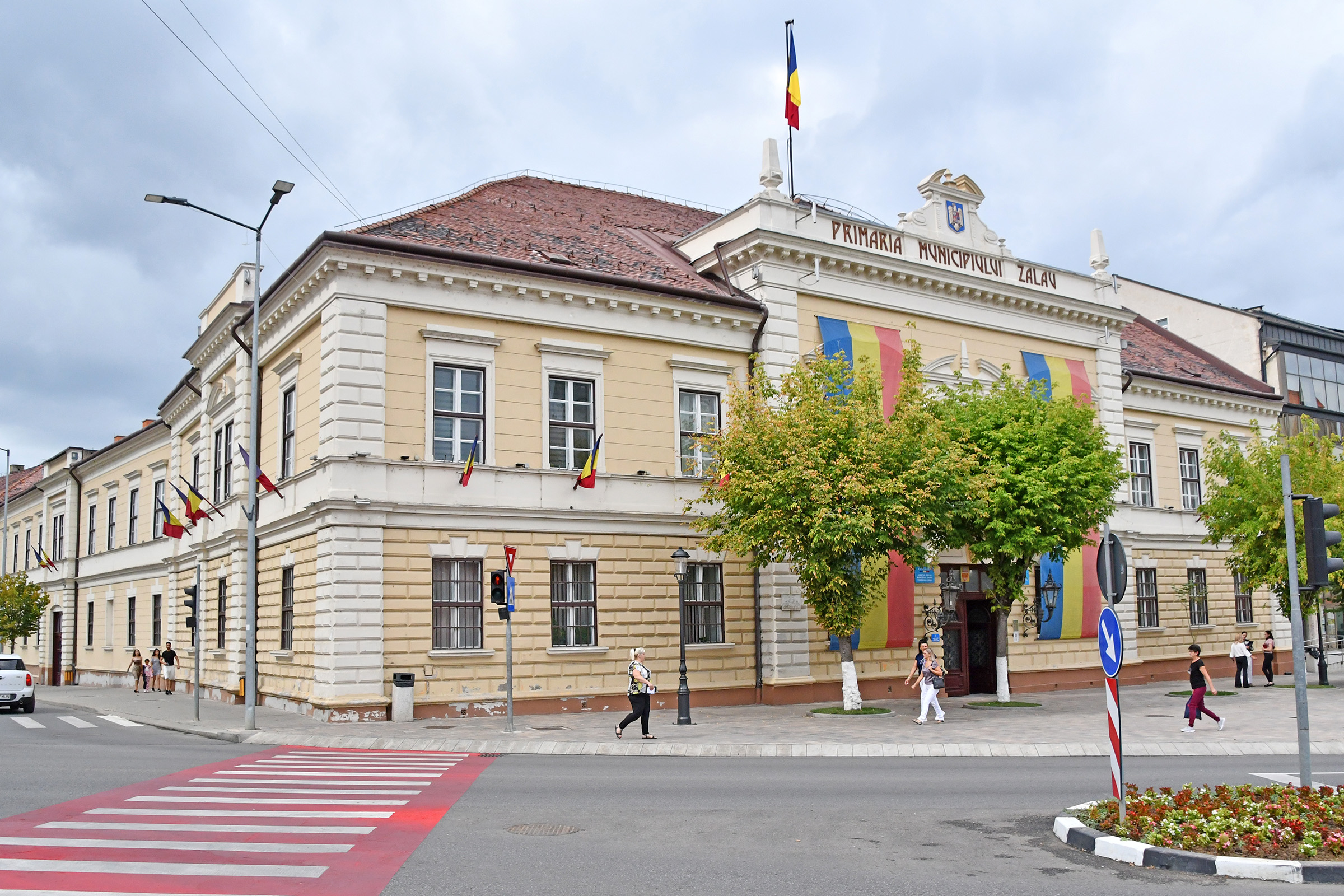
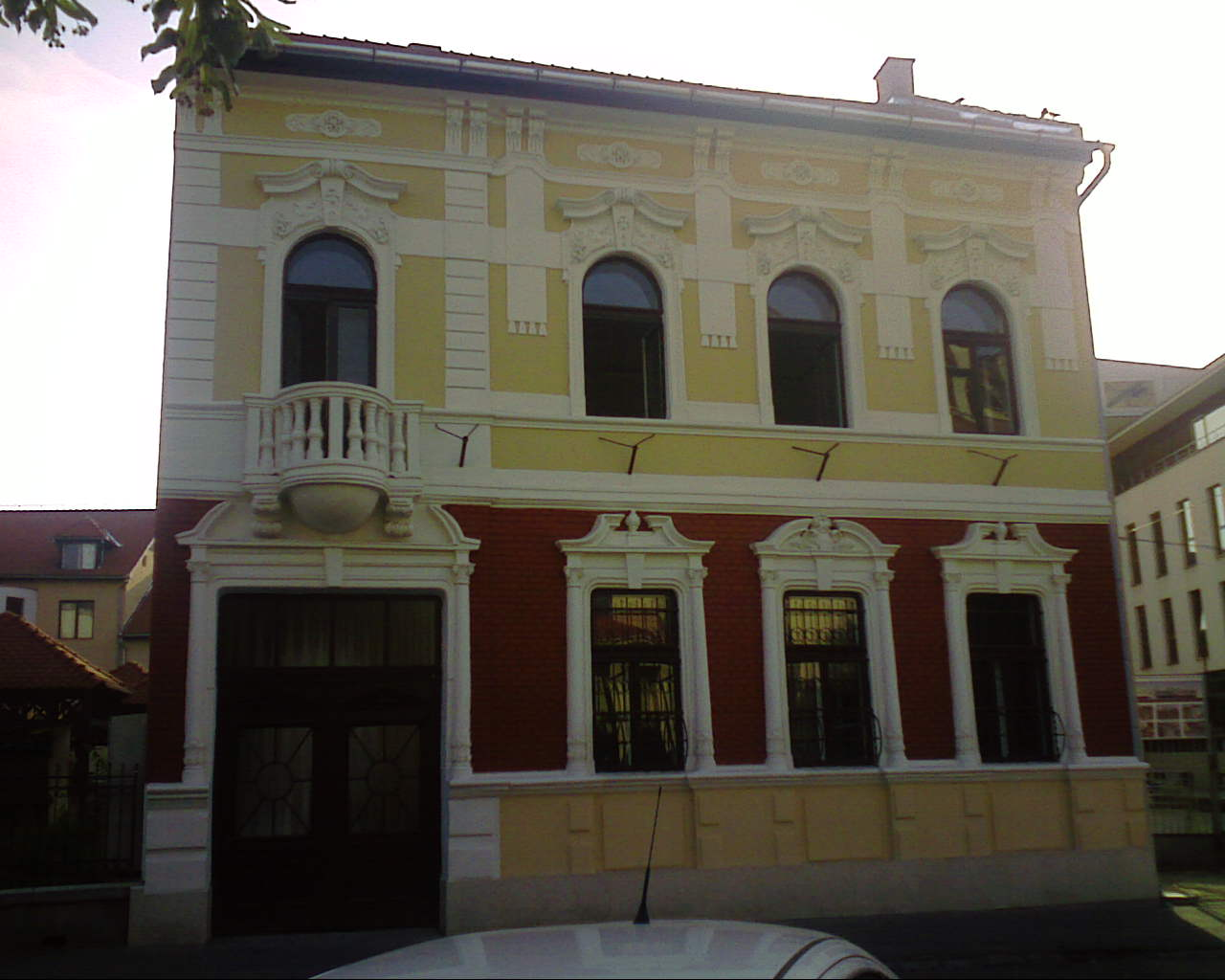
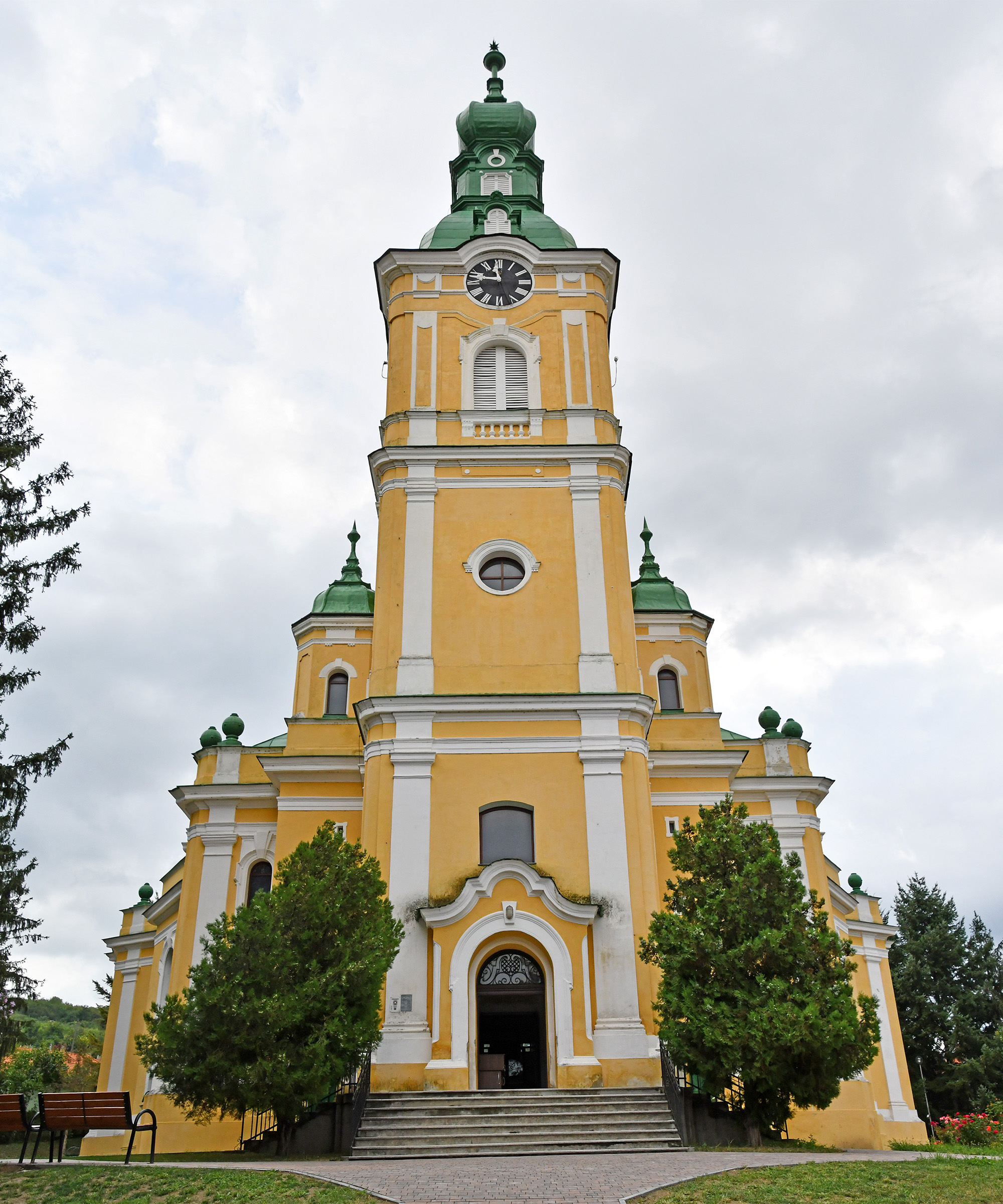
- City Hall Art and History Museum Reformed Church

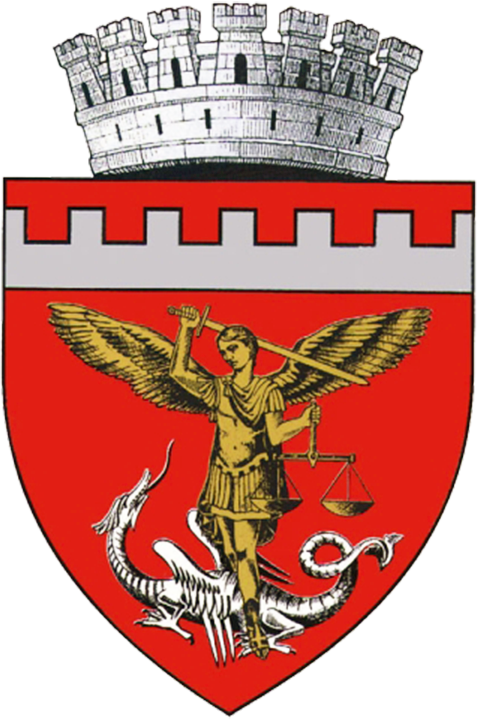
- Coat of arms

- Location in Sălaj County

- Location in Romania
- Coordinates: 47°11′28″N 23°3′26″E
- Country: Romania
- County: Sălaj

Government
  - Mayor (2025–2028): Florin Florian (PSD)
- Area: 90.09 km^{2} (34.78 sq mi)
- Elevation: 275 m (902 ft)
- Population (2021-12-01): 52,359
  - Density: 581.2/km^{2} (1,505/sq mi)
- Time zone: UTC+02:00 (EET)
  - Summer (DST): UTC+03:00 (EEST)
- Postal code: 450006–450167
- Area code: (+40) 2 60
- Vehicle reg.: SJ
- Website: www.zalausj.ro

Zalău (Romanian pronunciation: [zaˈləw], unofficial and former official name: Romanian: Zălau (Romanian pronunciation: [zəlˈaw]; German: Zillenmarkt or Waltenberg, Hungarian: Zilah, Turkish: Zile)) is the seat of Sălaj County, Romania. In 2021, its estimated population was 52,359.

== History ==
=== Prehistory and classical antiquity ===
Archaeological discoveries revealed evidence of human existence in this area since the neolithic, approx. 6500 years ago.

After the conquest of Dacia by Trajan (106), the norder of the Roman Empire stood atop the Meseș Mountains, just 5 km (3.1 mi) away from the city. Just north from the border, on the actual Zalău city area, were the free Dacian tribes, and to the east, south-east of the Meseș Mountains, were Roman border fortifications, towers, walls, ditches and defensive works. Zalău is situated 8 km (5.0 mi) away from the historical landmark of Porolissum, a well-preserved Roman castra with an imposing fortress, an amphitheater, temples, houses and a customs house in the ancient Roman province of Dacia. Zalău was the crossing point between Central Europe and Transylvania, along the so-called "Salt Route".

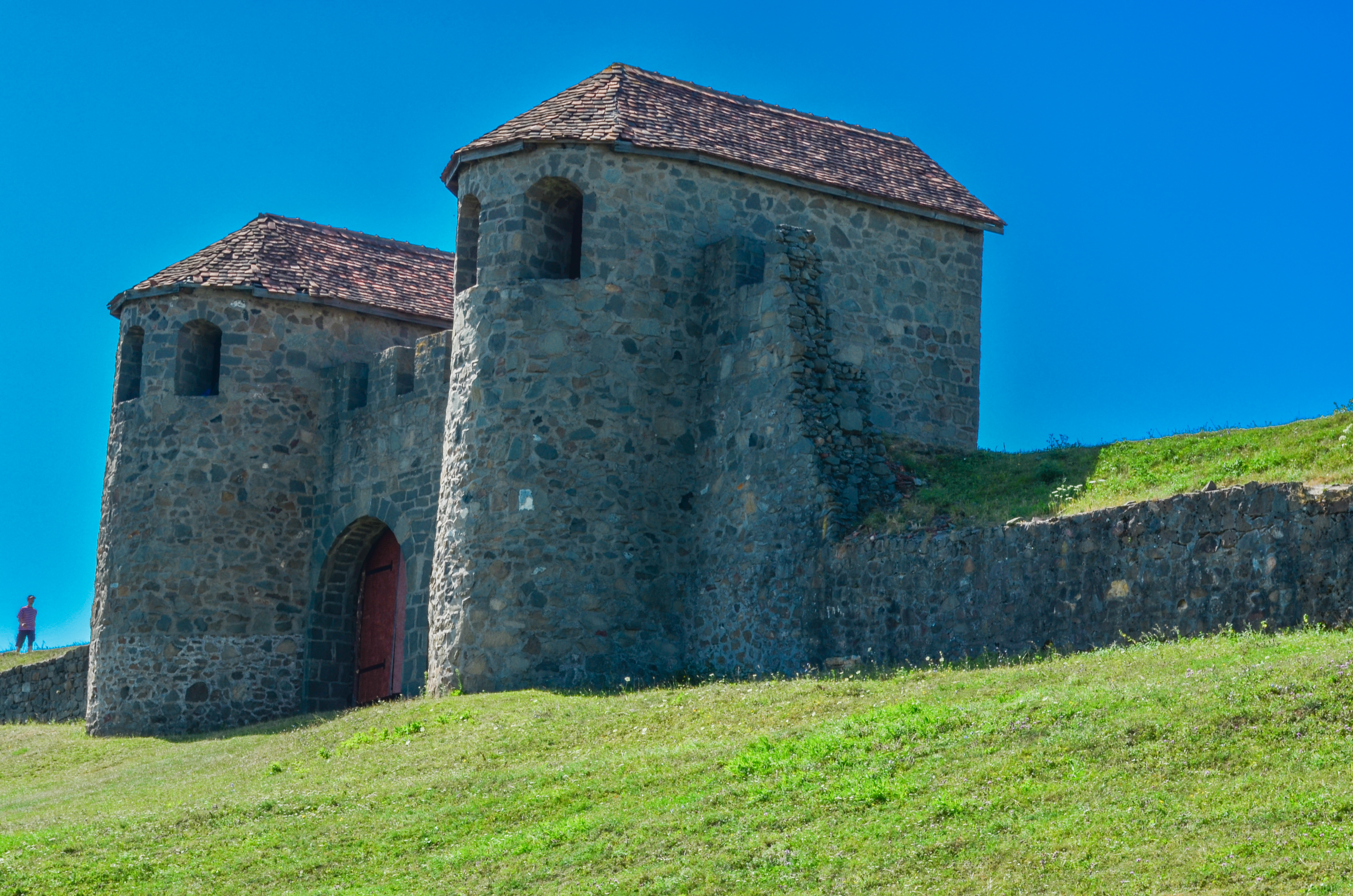
Porta Praetoria, the gate of ancient Roman castra at Porolissum

Dacian coins found in archaeological perimeters of the city's central area and on the Valea Mâții, west of the city, plus important items belonging to Roman culture, are evidence of free Dacian continuity in this area and of developing economic relations with the Roman ancient city of Porolissum.

=== Middle Ages ===
The first written mention about Zalău, was in the "Gesta Hungarorum", also called the "Chronicle of Anonymous" (probably notary of the King Béla III of Hungary), published around year 1200. According to this source, Zalău settlement would have been there as early as around 900. Later, Zalău is referred to as Villa Ziloc in 1220, Zylac in 1246, Zylah in 1282, Zyloh and oppidum Zylah in 1318, Zila in 1601, Zilahu in 1808, Sziláj / Szilágyi in 1839, Szilaju in 1850, and Zalău / Sziláju / Walthenberg in 1854. After the great Mongol invasion, which destroyed the city in 1241, Zalău came in 1246 under the administration of the Catholic Bishopric of Nagyvárad. The trusteeship was maintained until 1542, when Zalău became part of Principality of Transylvania.

On 1 August 1473, Matthias Corvinus, King of Hungary and Bohemia, acknowledged Zalău as a market town for the first time (called oppidum Zilah – Zilah fort), a privilege that freed the city from the county domination, granted its citizens the right of free trade and gave it a larger degree of economic autonomy. At the end of the 16th century, the city had an independent administrative leadership, composed of 33 elected senators (one of whom was the mayor), a notary, a registrar and a treasurer.

Other important events in the development of the city occurred in 1571 during the reign of Prince Istvan Bathory and in 1600 under the reign of Michael the Brave. After Transylvania had been annexed to the Habsburg Empire, the city experienced an economic decline due to the infusion of products from Western Europe. After Michael the Brave's victory in the Battle of Guruslău on 3 August 1601, Zalău received administrative, legislative, fiscal and military own rules, which provided real autonomy freedoms to citizens. A chronicle from the 17th century, first mentioned the main crafts of city residents: belt-makers, potters, wheelwrights, shoemakers, butchers, tailors, blacksmiths, carpenters, hat makers and armorers.

The city was under the rule Principality of Transylvania between 1526 and 1660. It was also controlled by the Ottomans between 1660 and 1692, the city being part of Varat Eyalet. The Calvinist college was formed in the first half of the 17th century.

On 9 November 1714, Charles XII of Sweden rested for a night in a building on Király street (now named after Corneliu Coposu) with an acquaintance György Zoványi as is indicated by a notice still on the house. Until the administrative reform of 1876, the city was the seat of Közép-Szolnok County for centuries.

=== Modern times ===
Zalău is one of the most important urban centers in the region. It had a Reformed college (Wesselényi College), a township school for civil service (for boys only), and a national civil school (for girls only). It had the largest hospital in the region and a tax revenue office.

In 1850, it held a population of 4,294 and, in 1910–8,062 (7,477 Hungarians, 19 Germans, 529 Romanians and 23 belonging to other ethnic groups). By religion, there were 1,333 Roman Catholics, 873 Greek Catholics, 5,363 members of the Reformed Church, and 415 Jews. The city had 1,427 households, and most of its inhabitants were employed by the manufacturing industry. The Reformed Church was built in 1246. It is one of the city's oldest buildings and one of the largest in Eastern Europe.

In 1876, Zalău became the seat of the Szilágy County. After the proclamation of the Union of Transylvania with Romania (1 December 1918), by the Treaty of Trianon Zalău has been part of Romania – except between 1940 until the end of World War II, when Northern Transylvania became part of Hungary as a result of the Second Vienna Award. On 8 September 1940, upon arrival in Zalău, the Hungarian Army killed 10 people just outside the city; in the following days, the Nușfalău, Treznea, and Ip massacres were perpetrated in nearby villages.

Between 1892 and 1896, one of the most famous Hungarian poets Endre Ady attended the Protestant school in Zalău (since 1957, there has been a statue of Endre Ady in front of the school). The poet also published his first poem in the local newspaper "Szilágy" on 22 March 1896. A memorial plaque on the frontage of the building where he lived reminiscents of Ady Endre's time spent there.

At the end of the 19th century, Lajos Szikszai donated his private collection to the municipality and the first museum in Zalău was created. An exhibition was also organized in 1926, but the Zalău County Museum was officially inaugurated in 1951. On 9 July 1981, a new section of the Zalău County Museum was inaugurated and was named the "Ioan Sima" Arts Gallery.

The Battle of Zalău took place in 1919, during the Hungarian–Romanian War.

The Central Library, owning 7,000 Romanian and Hungarian books, was opened on the 23 August 1950. In 1952 it became the Raion Library, coordinating all the Zalău Raion libraries. In 1957 it took the name of Ioniță Scipione Bădescu. It became the County Library with the administrative reform of February 1968.

As of the end of the 1960s, the city became a regional industrial center for the first time, which was heavily impacted by the Systematization process. Industrial factories like Armătura Zalău, Silcotub Zalău, and Anvelope Silvania (recently bought by Michelin) hired thousands of workers, which sparked an increase in population as a result. The population influx gradually led to changes in the ethnic structure with the Romanians being now the majority and the Hungarians reduced to a minority. However, in many of the surrounding communes, the ethnic structure still remained unchanged (for example Vârșolț) are still populated by Hungarians; on the other hand, nearby villages such as Marin have a 100% ethnic Romanian population, basically unchanged for more than a century. In the 1970s with the working-class population expanding, housing estates of high-rise blocks of flats were built in both the centre and the outskirts of the town.

In 2007, due to the negligence of the local natural gas distributor, a gas accumulation produced an explosion that led to casualties and significant material damage.

Today Zalău is crossed by European road E81 and the national road DN1F. A new motorway (the Transylvania Highway) is being built to connect Zalău to Western Europe. The town has two nationally accredited University colleges, a public library, one museum, an art gallery, more than four hotels, a motel, and two student halls of residence.

=== Gallery ===
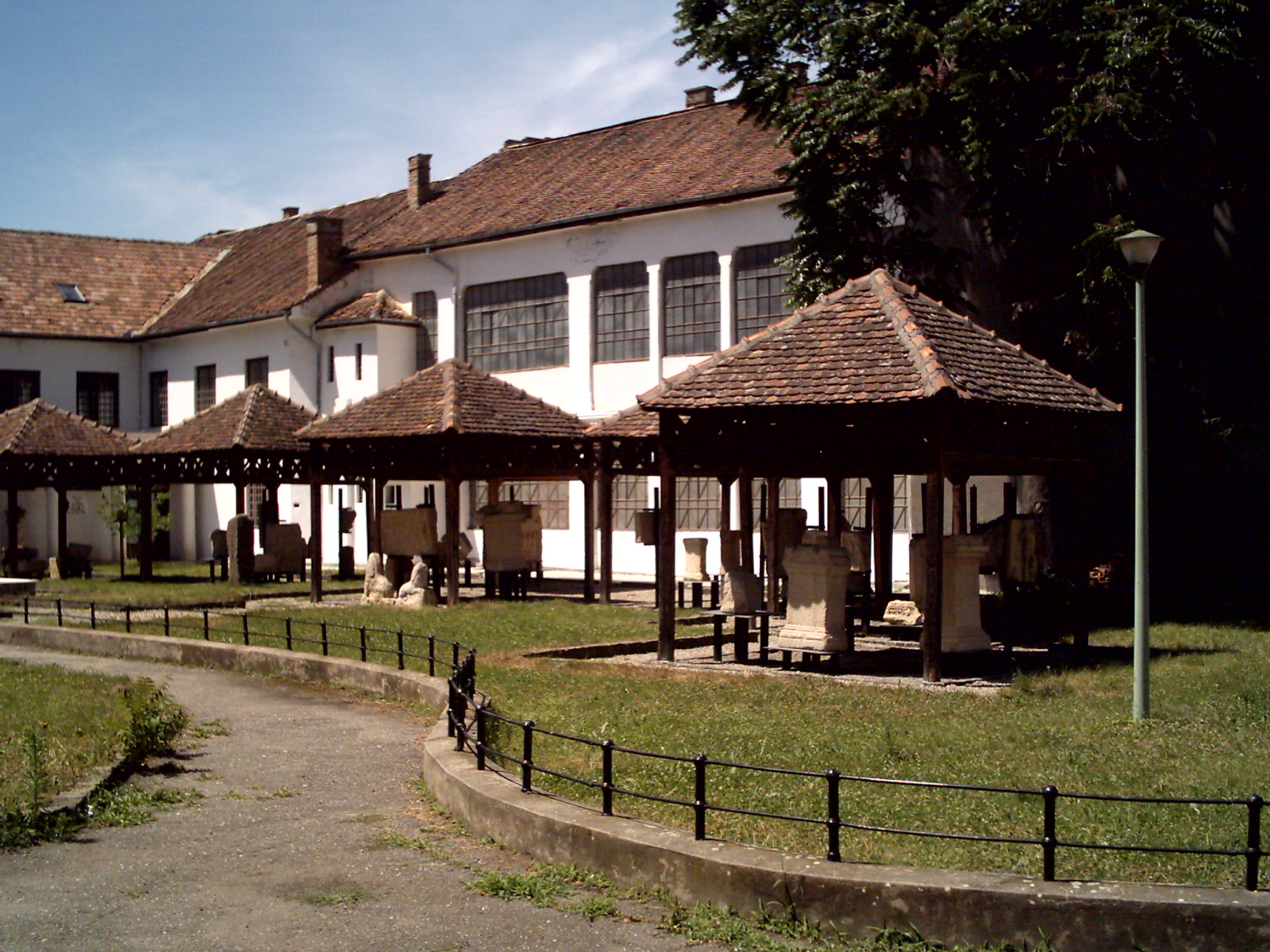
Roman relics at Zalău County Museum

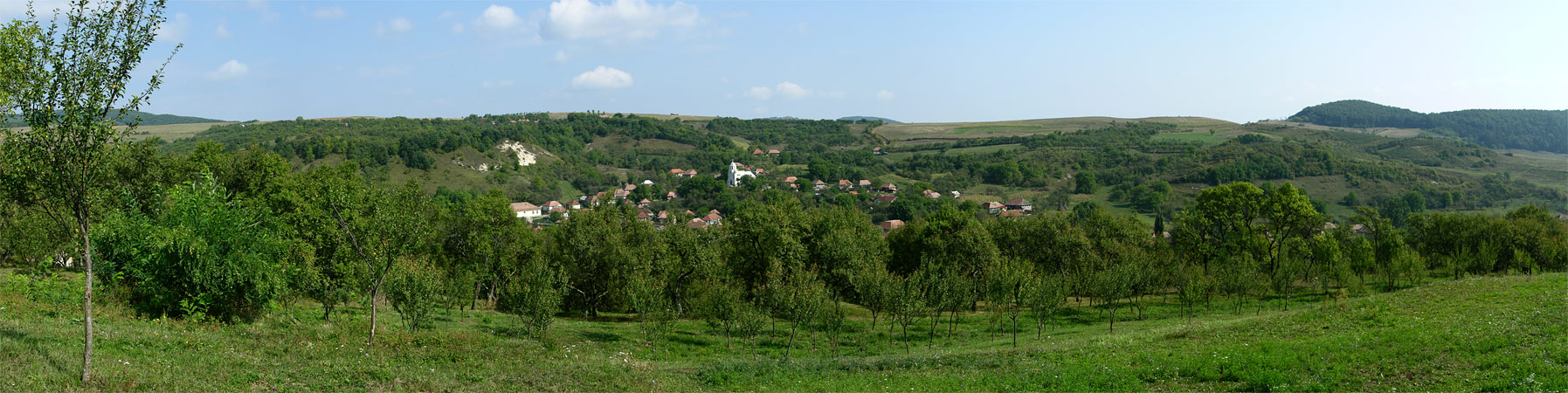
Stâna is a part of Zalău

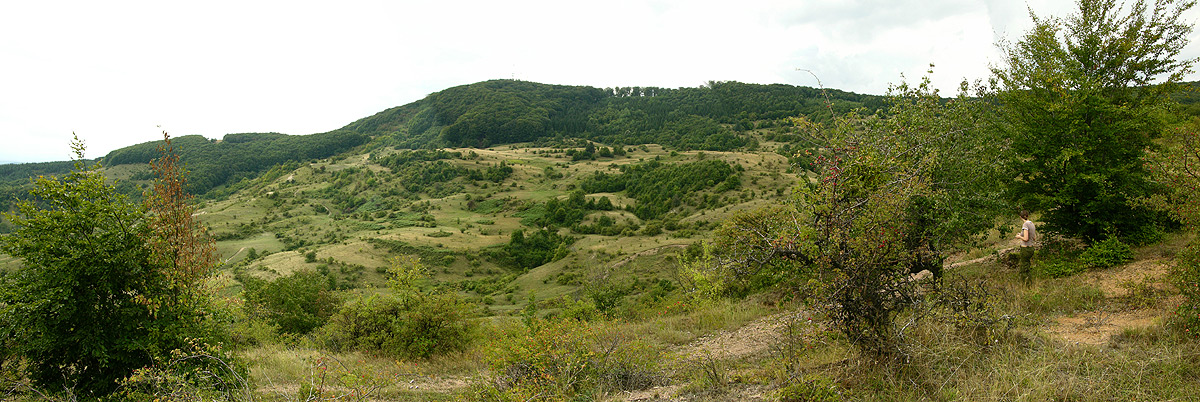
Măgura Stânii (716 m) in Stâna

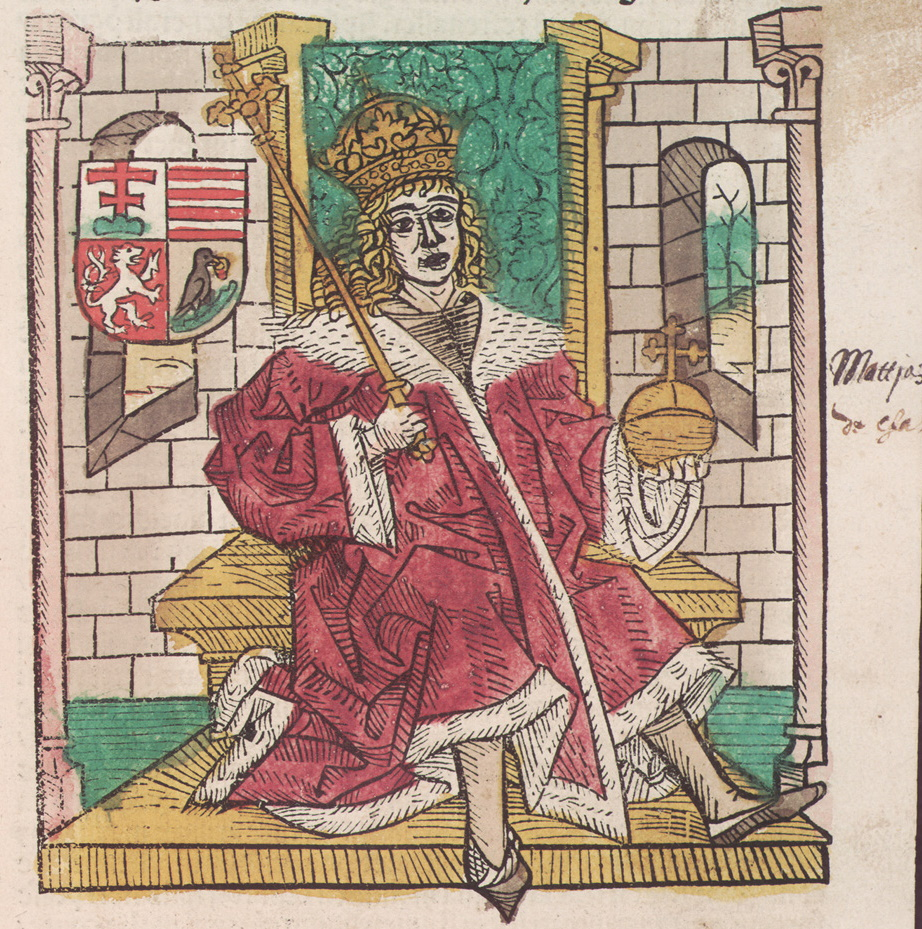
On 1 August 1473, Matthias Corvinus certified Zalău as a town, "Oppidum Zilah".

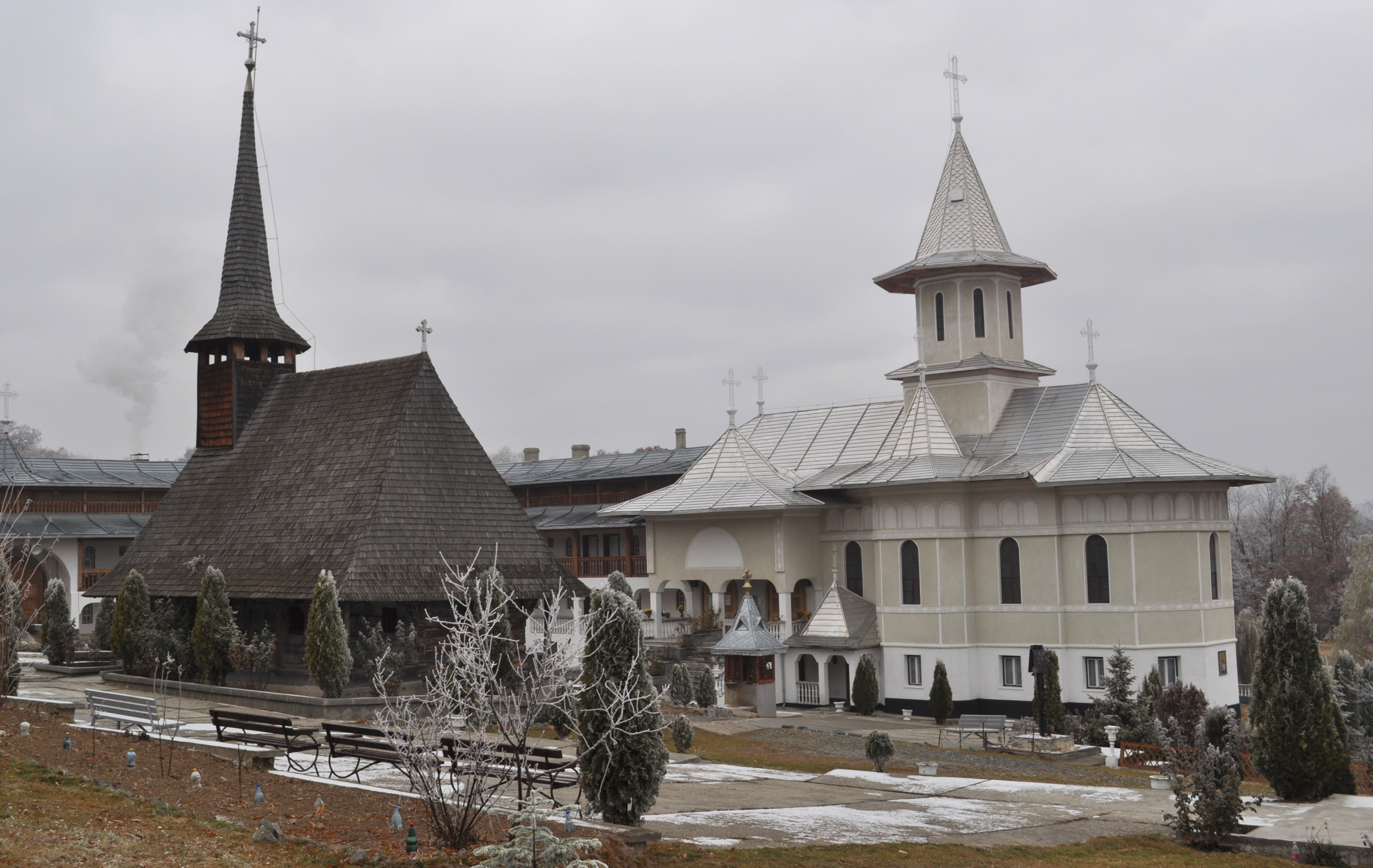
Wooden church of Stâna (a district of Zalău) built in 1778, transferred to Bic Monastery in 1997

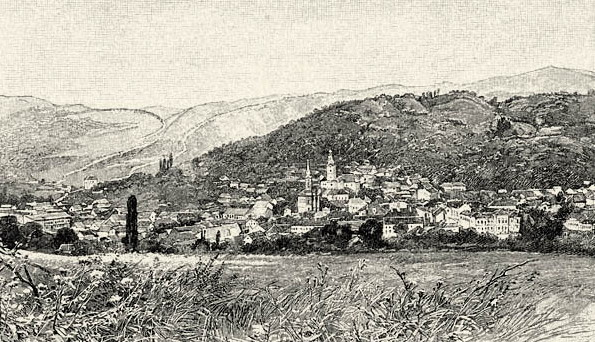
Zalău, 19th-century painting

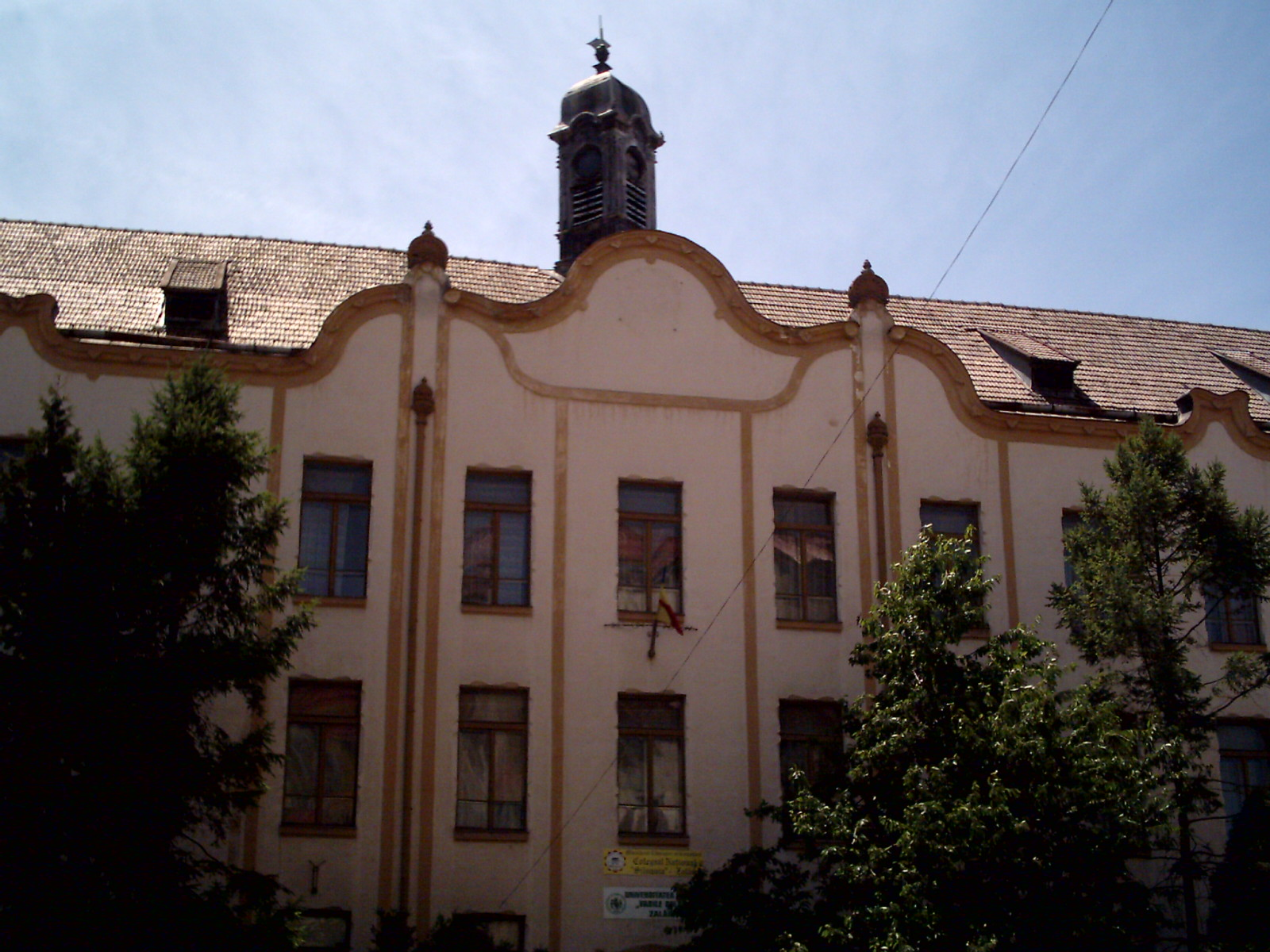
National College Silvania

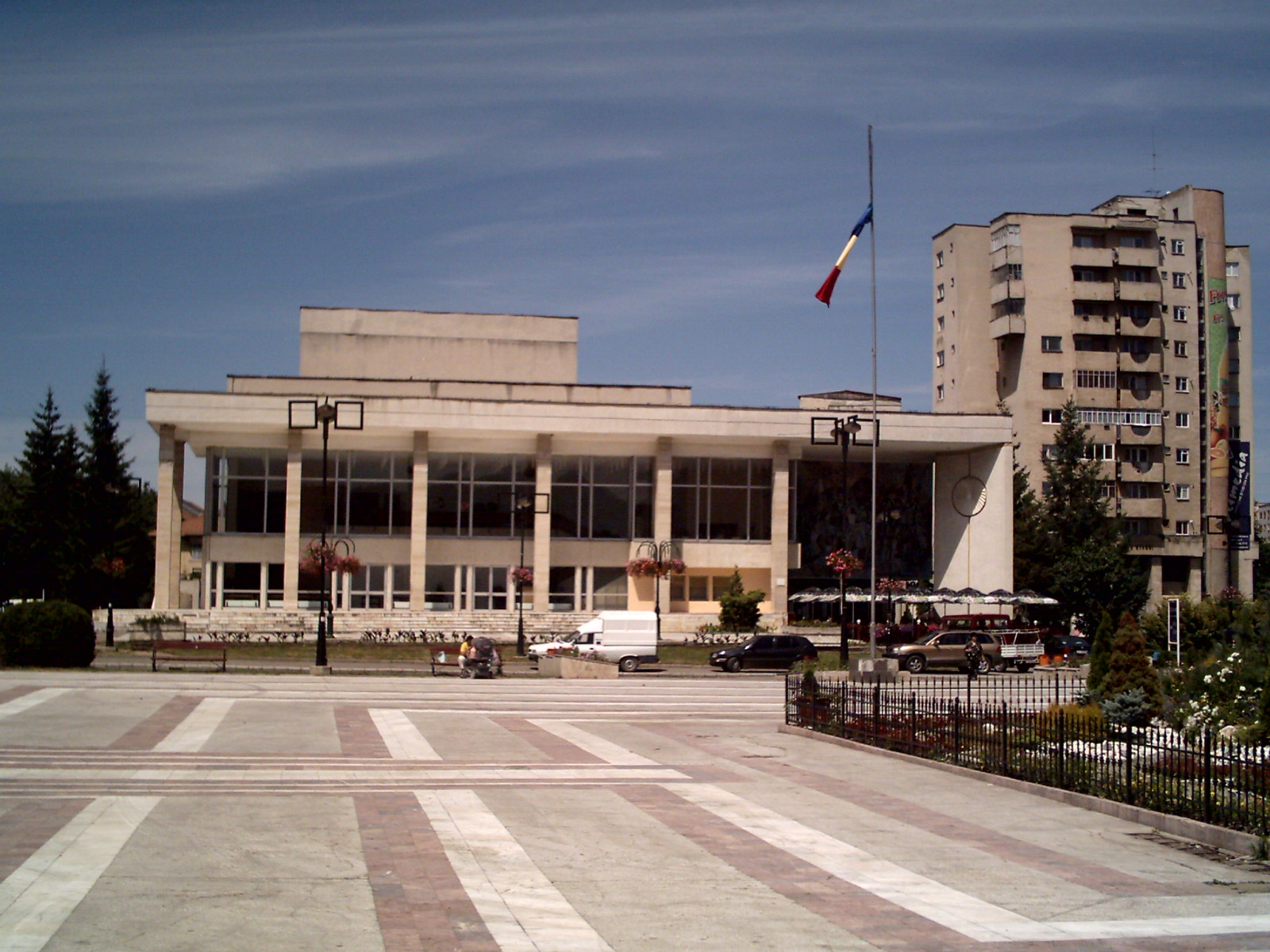
Unions' House of Culture and main square in Zalău

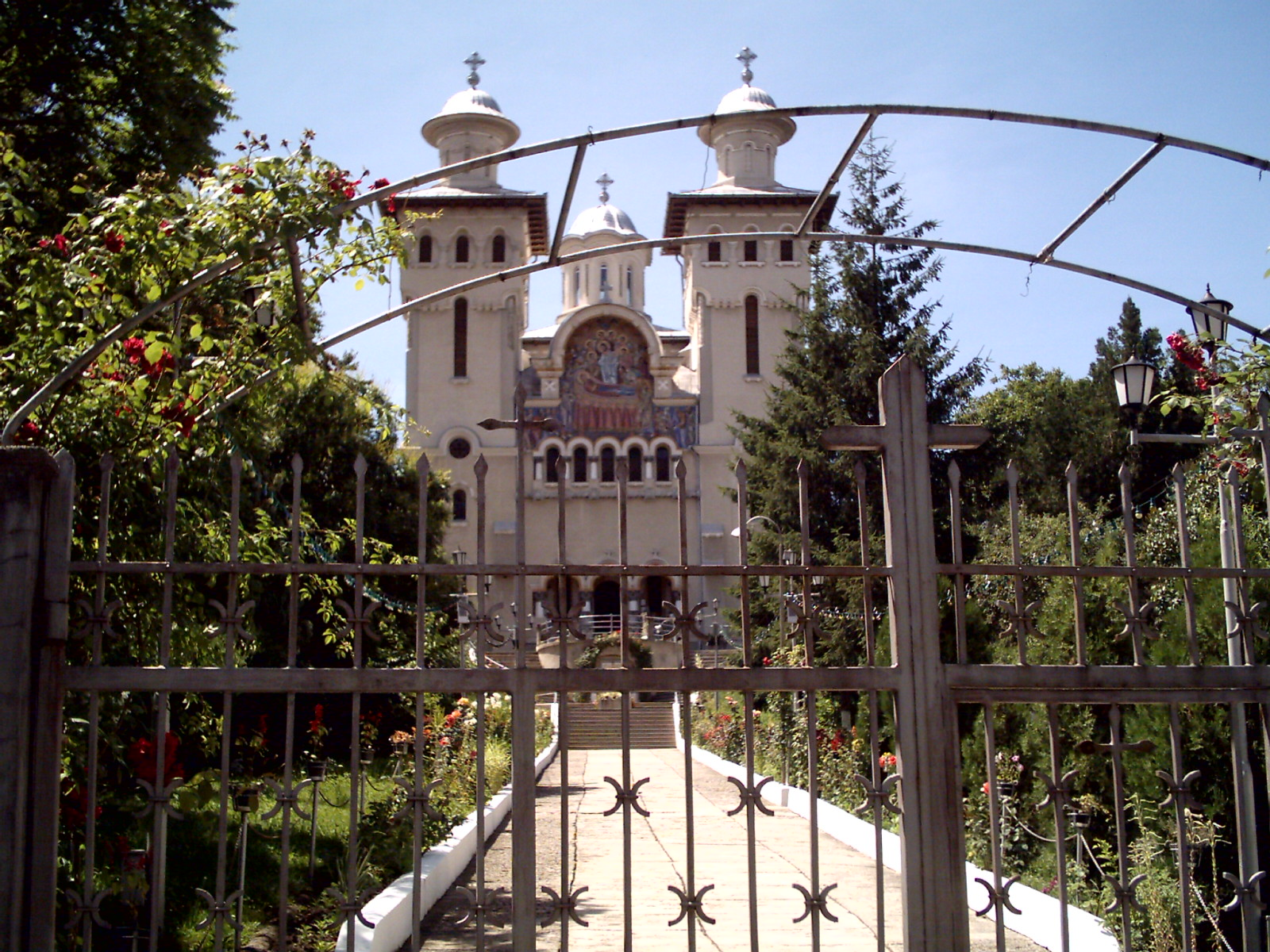
Dormition of the Theotokos Church was built in 1934 by the Greek Catholic community.

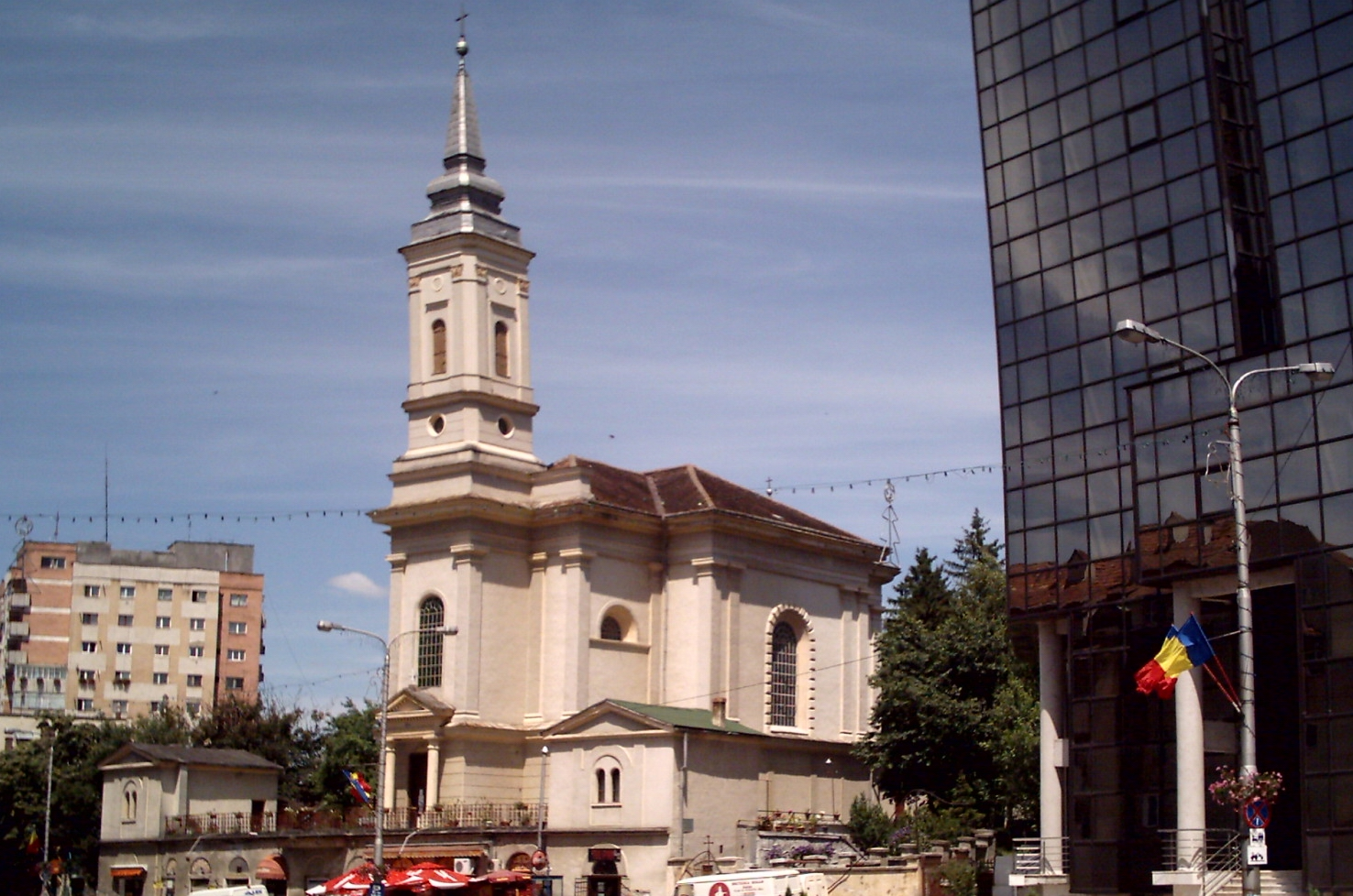
Catholic Church and City Centre

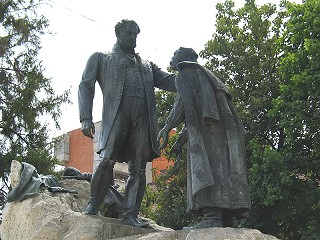
Wesselényi Monument, built in 1902 by János Fadrusz

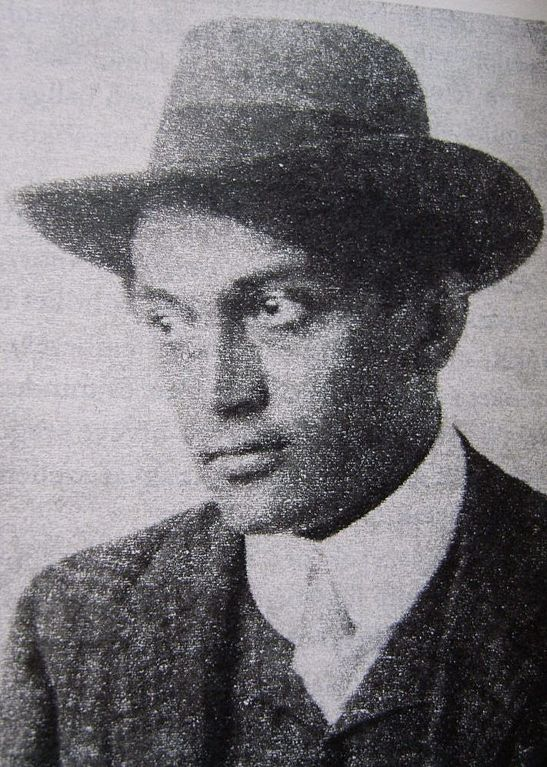
Ady Endre attended school in Zalău.

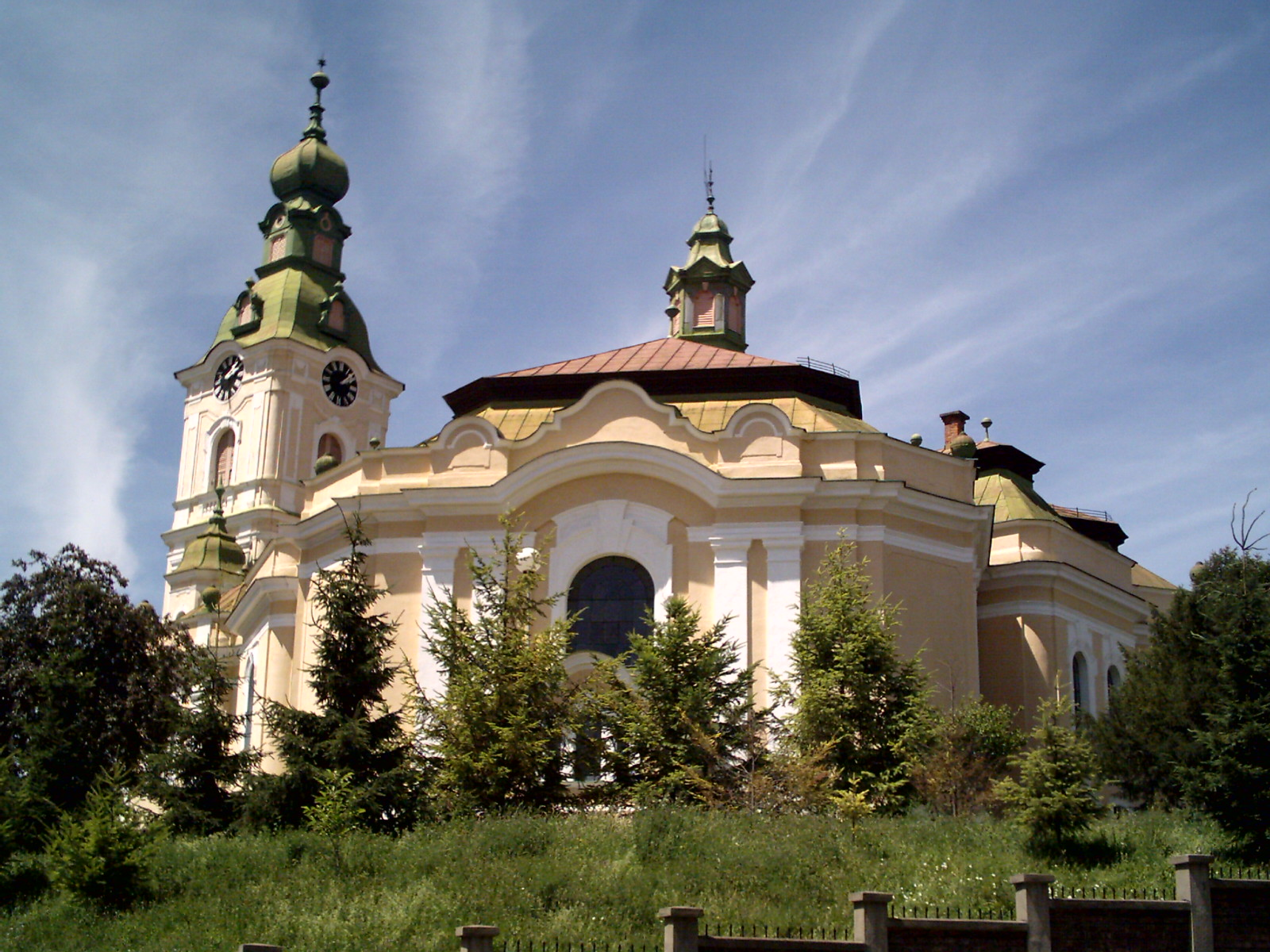
Reformed Church, Zalău built 1904–07

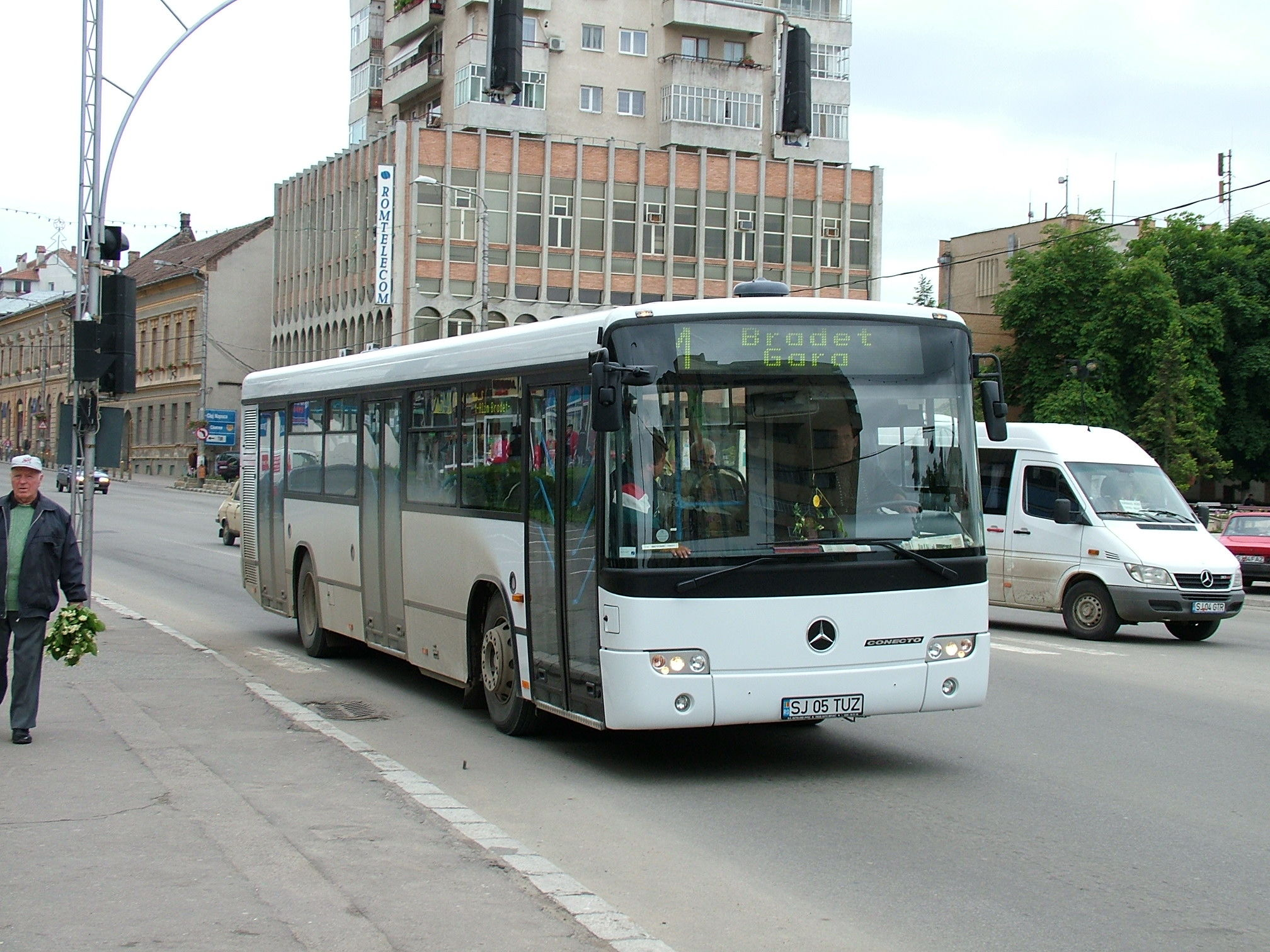
The main square in Zalău

== Geography ==
Zalău is the county seat and the largest city in Sălaj County. The city lies in the Zalău Valley, at the junction of the Apuseni Mountains and the Eastern Carpathians, at 47°12′N 23°3′E. It is located in the central part of Sălaj County, in the Zalău River watershed, between three narrow valleys in the Meseș Mountains.

It neighbours Țara Maramureșului and Satu Mare County, in the northwestern part of the historical region of Transylvania, which in the past was a mainly independent small state but since 1918 has belonged to Romania (except between September 1940 and October 1944, when it was under the administration of Hungary following the Second Vienna Award). Whether Zalău lies in Crișana or Transylvania is still a matter of debate because, geographically, Zalău lies on the eastern border of Crișana.

The city includes a total surface of 90.09 km^{2} (34.78 sq mi). This includes the one village it administers, Stâna (Felsőnyárló), situated south-east of Meseș, in the hydrographic basin of the Agrij River. Măgura Stânii is at an altitude of 716 m (2,349 ft).

== Climate ==
Zalău has a temperate continental climate influenced by its location within the Zalău Valley and the surrounding Meseș Mountains. The town lies at an elevation of approximately 275 m (965 ft) above sea level and is situated on the northern slope of Dâmbul Morii Hill. The local topography, particularly the presence of the Meseș Mountains to the south and southeast, influences air circulation, temperature inversions, and precipitation patterns in the area.

Meteorological observations in Zalău are conducted at the Zalău Meteorological Station, located about 2 km southeast of the city centre. The station operates synoptic, climatological, pluviometric, and agrometeorological programmes and provides data for weather forecasting and climatological research. Continuous meteorological observations have been carried out since 1945, while the station has occupied its present location since 1961.

The highest air temperature recorded in Zalău was 38.2 °C (100.8 °F), measured on 21 and 22 July 2007. The lowest temperature recorded was −23.5 °C (−10.3 °F) on 28 January 1954. The greatest precipitation amount recorded in a 24-hour period was 66.6 mm on 4 July 1967, while the wettest month on record was June 1974, when 231.2 mm of precipitation was measured.

The climate is characterized by warm summers, cold winters, and moderate precipitation throughout the year, with rainfall maxima typically occurring during late spring and summer. The surrounding hills and forests contribute to local climatic variations and provide some shelter from prevailing winds.

Climate data for Zalău (elevation 294m, 2014–2026 normals, extremes 1961–present)
Month	Jan	Feb	Mar	Apr	May	Jun	Jul	Aug	Sep	Oct	Nov	Dec	Year
Record high °C (°F)	16.1 (61.0)	19.8 (67.6)	27.6 (81.7)	28.8 (83.8)	32.7 (90.9)	38.3 (100.9)	38.2 (100.8)	38.8 (101.8)	35.4 (95.7)	29.5 (85.1)	25.9 (78.6)	19.5 (67.1)	38.8 (101.8)
Mean daily maximum °C (°F)	3.6 (38.5)	7.2 (45.0)	12.0 (53.6)	16.8 (62.2)	21.2 (70.2)	26.2 (79.2)	28.0 (82.4)	28.7 (83.7)	23.3 (73.9)	16.8 (62.2)	10.3 (50.5)	5.2 (41.4)	16.6 (61.9)
Daily mean °C (°F)	0.6 (33.1)	3.6 (38.5)	7.2 (45.0)	11.4 (52.5)	15.8 (60.4)	20.6 (69.1)	22.1 (71.8)	22.5 (72.5)	17.9 (64.2)	12.1 (53.8)	6.8 (44.2)	2.7 (36.9)	11.9 (53.5)
Mean daily minimum °C (°F)	−2.4 (27.7)	-0.0 (32.0)	2.4 (36.3)	6.0 (42.8)	10.3 (50.5)	15.1 (59.2)	16.2 (61.2)	16.2 (61.2)	12.6 (54.7)	7.3 (45.1)	3.3 (37.9)	0.1 (32.2)	7.3 (45.1)
Record low °C (°F)	−23.5 (−10.3)	−18.3 (−0.9)	−15.6 (3.9)	−5.6 (21.9)	−1.1 (30.0)	3.2 (37.8)	6.7 (44.1)	5.0 (41.0)	−2.0 (28.4)	−8.0 (17.6)	−15.4 (4.3)	−18.0 (−0.4)	−23.5 (−10.3)
Average precipitation mm (inches)	38.9 (1.53)	38.9 (1.53)	35.3 (1.39)	43.6 (1.72)	74.6 (2.94)	78.0 (3.07)	75.3 (2.96)	52.9 (2.08)	65.6 (2.58)	43.4 (1.71)	55.2 (2.17)	43.8 (1.72)	645.5 (25.4)
Average precipitation days (≥ 1.0 mm)	9.9	7.7	8.0	6.5	10.8	8.5	8.0	5.8	7.0	7.6	8.7	8.4	96.9
Average snowy days	10.3	5.7	2.2	1.8	0	0	0	0	0	0	1.9	6.5	28.4
Source 1: Meteomanz (2014-2026)
Source 2: Inversiuni Termice (1961-2000)

== Sights ==
The most important of the 24 monuments and buildings in the county capital of Zalău are: "Transilvania" (theatre in 1895), the city hall (court and seat of the prefects office in 1889), the Roman Catholic Church (1878), the reformed church (1904–1907), the Greek Catholic "Dormition of the Theotokos Church" (1930–1934), the Orthodox deanery (built in the late 19th century), the Historical Museum (built about 1900 – casino of the artisans fellowship), the primary school "Simion Bărnuțiu" (girls' school in 1895) and the National College Silvania (Reformed College in 1860), all these being valuable urbanistic elements for the historical and cultural patrimony of the land. The famous statuary group Wesselényi Monument of the heroic Hungarian nobleman with the same name (1902) by János Fadrusz, and the bust made in the honour of Simion Bărnuțiu by Romul Ladea are worth visiting as well.

Zalău hosts lively pageants each year, including a summer festival known as the "Zalău Days". There is a statue of Baron Wesselényi in Iuliu Maniu Square of the town center; the Tuhutum Memorial (both made by János Fadrusz in 1902); the Zalău County Museum of History and Art displays artifacts ranging from neolithic times to modern times, with a focus on the Roman period and hosts works of modern art. There are several churches, including the Calvinist Cathedral, which is one of the most beautiful and largest in Transylvania.

== Population ==
The population of Zalău went through important evolutions through time. At the 2021 census, Zalău had a population of 52,359. At the 2011 census it had 56,202 inhabitants; of those, 76.5% were Romanians, 15.4% Hungarians, 1.4% Romani, and for 6.5% no ethnicity information was available. According to the census in 2002, the population had the following structure: 80.89% Romanians, 17.50% Hungarians, 1.36% Romani, 0.25% others.

Historical population
Year	Pop.	±%
1850	4,294	—
1880	5,961	+38.8%
1910	8,062	+35.2%
1930	8,340	+3.4%
1941	8,546	+2.5%
1948	11,652	+36.3%
1956	13,378	+14.8%
1966	14,380	+7.5%
1977	31,923	+122.0%
1992	68,404	+114.3%
2002	62,927	−8.0%
2011	56,202	−10.7%
2021	52,359	−6.8%

=== Ethnic structure ===
Total	Romanians	Hungarians	Roma	Other
1850
4,290	20	4,137	76
100%	0.5%	96.4%	1.8%
1910
10,184	2,585	7,540		59
100%	25.38%	74.03%		0.57%
1930
10,688	4,364	5,624	140	560
100%	40.84%	52.61%	1.30%	5.23%
1956
13,378	6,468	6,756	15	144
100%	48.34%	50.50%	0.11	1.07%
1977
31,923	22,076	9,665	83	99
100%	69.15%	30.27%	0.26%	0,31%
1992
68,404	53,974	13,637	629	164
100%	78.90%	19.93%	0.91%	0.23%
2002
62,927	50,902	11,016	858	151
100%	80.89%	17.50%	1.36%	0.23%
2011
53,308	43,489	8,742	801	276
100%	81.58%	16.40%	1.50%	0.52%

=== Confessional structure ===
Zalău confessional structure
Confession	1930	2002
Reformed Church in Romania	52.41%	15.24%
Greek Catholics	18.98%	3.07%
Roman Catholics	11.46%	1.72%
Romanian Orthodox	6.01%	73.29%
Jews	5.14%	< 0.1%
Baptists	0.91%	2.01%
Pentecostals	< 0.1%	3.29%

== Etymology ==
The location had various names: "Ziloc" in 1220, "Oppidum Zilah" in 1473, "Zila" in 1601, and "Zilahu" and "Zalahu" in the 19th century, or forms of German toponymy "Waltenberg" and "Zillenmarkt".

== Politics ==
At the end of the 16th century, the town had an independent administrative rule made of 33 elected senators, from whom one of them was the mayor. There were also a notary, an archivist and a treasurer.

Formed by 21 members, the Local Council has the following attributes: to approve the local budget, loans, credit transfers and the means of the use of the budgetary reserve; it establishes local taxes as well as special taxes; to elect the vice-mayors, to decide on the staff of attendants number.

=== 2012 election ===
The Zalău Council, elected in the 2012 local government elections, was made up of 21 councilors, with the following party composition: 3-Democratic Alliance of Hungarians in Romania, 12-Social Liberal Union, 3-Democratic Liberal Party, 3-People's Party – Dan Diaconescu. Mayor Radu Căpîlnășiu was re-elected.

Party	Seats	2012 Zalău Council
Social Liberal Union	12	
Democratic Alliance of Hungarians in Romania	3	
Democratic Liberal Party	3	
People's Party – Dan Diaconescu	3	

=== 2008 elections ===
Mayor Radu Căpîlnășiu was elected first time in 2004 as member of Democratic Party (PD) and re-elected in 2008 and 2012 as member of National Liberal Party (PNL).

The Zalău Municipal Council, elected in the 2008 local government elections, was made up of 21 councilors, with the following party composition:

Party	Seats	2008 Zalău Council
National Liberal Party	9	
Democratic Liberal Party	4	
Social Democratic Party	4	
Democratic Alliance of Hungarians in Romania	4	

=== 2004 elections ===
The Zalău Municipal Council, elected in the 2004 local government elections, was made up of 21 councillors, with the following party composition:

Party	Seats	2004 Zalău Council
Social Democratic Party	6	
National Liberal Party	5	
Democratic Party	5	
Democratic Alliance of Hungarians in Romania	3	
Greater Romania Party	2	

== Sports ==
The city has a women's handball team, named HC Zalău, that is coached by Gheorghe Tadici, the former head coach of Romania's national handball team.

== Media ==
Graiul Sălajului, Magazin Sălăjean, Sălajeanul, Țara Silvaniei (1940, 1989), Năzuința (1960–1989), Sălajul Orizont, Gazeta de Duminică, Glasul copilăriei, Repere transilvane, Sălajul european, Acta mvsei porolissensis, Caiete silvane, Limes, Árkád, Szilágy, Szilágyság.

=== Online media ===
- Zalau24.ro News reports on events happening in Zalău and in Sălaj County.

== Notable natives and residents ==
- Endre Ady (1877–1919), Hungarian poet
- Dacian Cioloș (born 1969), politician, Prime Minister of Romania
- Alexandru Dragomir (1916–2002), Romanian philosopher
- Ramona Farcău (born 1979), Romanian handball player
- Virgil D. Gligor (born 1949), Romanian-American professor of electrical and computer engineering
- Eduard Hellvig (born 1974), director of the Romanian Intelligence Service
- Iuliu Maniu (1873–1953), Romanian politician
- Florian Pop (born 1952), Romanian-American mathematician
- Codruț Șereș (born 1969), Romanian engineer and politician
- Gheorghe Tadici (born 1952), Romanian handball coach
- Talida Tolnai (born 1979), Romanian handball player
- Miklós Wesselényi (1796–1850), Hungarian statesman
- Gyula Zilahy (1859–1938), Hungarian stage and film actor

== International relations ==
=== Twin towns – Sister cities ===
Zalău is twinned with:

- Altagracia, Nicaragua (since 2018)
- Gyula, Hungary (since 1991)
- Imola, Italy (since 2005)
- Kvinesdal, Norway (since 2008)
- Rîșcani, Moldova (since 2017)
- Sanok, Poland (since 1986)
- Szentendre, Hungary (since 1995)

== Climate ==
Zalău has a humid continental climate (Dfb in the Köppen climate classification).

Climate data for Zalău
Month	Jan	Feb	Mar	Apr	May	Jun	Jul	Aug	Sep	Oct	Nov	Dec	Year
Mean daily maximum °C (°F)	1.7 (35.1)	4.1 (39.4)	9.5 (49.1)	15.6 (60.1)	20.1 (68.2)	23.4 (74.1)	25.3 (77.5)	25.5 (77.9)	20.5 (68.9)	14.9 (58.8)	9.2 (48.6)	3 (37)	14.4 (57.9)
Daily mean °C (°F)	−1.8 (28.8)	-0 (32)	4.6 (40.3)	10.5 (50.9)	15.2 (59.4)	18.8 (65.8)	20.6 (69.1)	20.6 (69.1)	15.6 (60.1)	10 (50)	5 (41)	−0.2 (31.6)	9.9 (49.8)
Mean daily minimum °C (°F)	−5.2 (22.6)	−4.1 (24.6)	−0.4 (31.3)	4.6 (40.3)	9.4 (48.9)	13.1 (55.6)	15.1 (59.2)	15 (59)	10.6 (51.1)	5.6 (42.1)	1.5 (34.7)	−3.2 (26.2)	5.2 (41.3)
Average precipitation mm (inches)	50 (2.0)	49 (1.9)	60 (2.4)	69 (2.7)	83 (3.3)	97 (3.8)	93 (3.7)	70 (2.8)	74 (2.9)	62 (2.4)	56 (2.2)	59 (2.3)	822 (32.4)
Source: https://en.climate-data.org/europe/romania/salaj/zalau-1342/

== Photo gallery ==
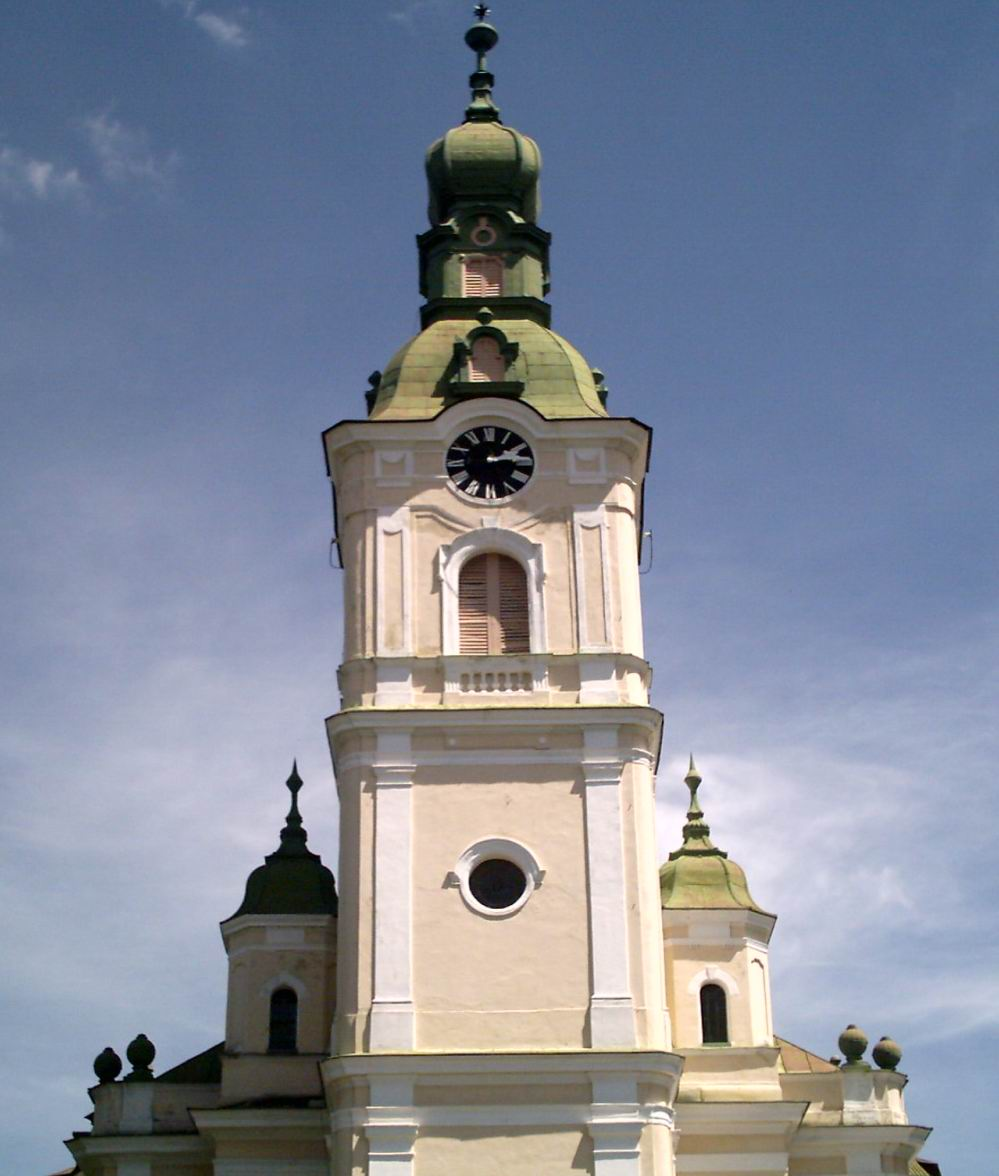
Reformed Church, Zalău

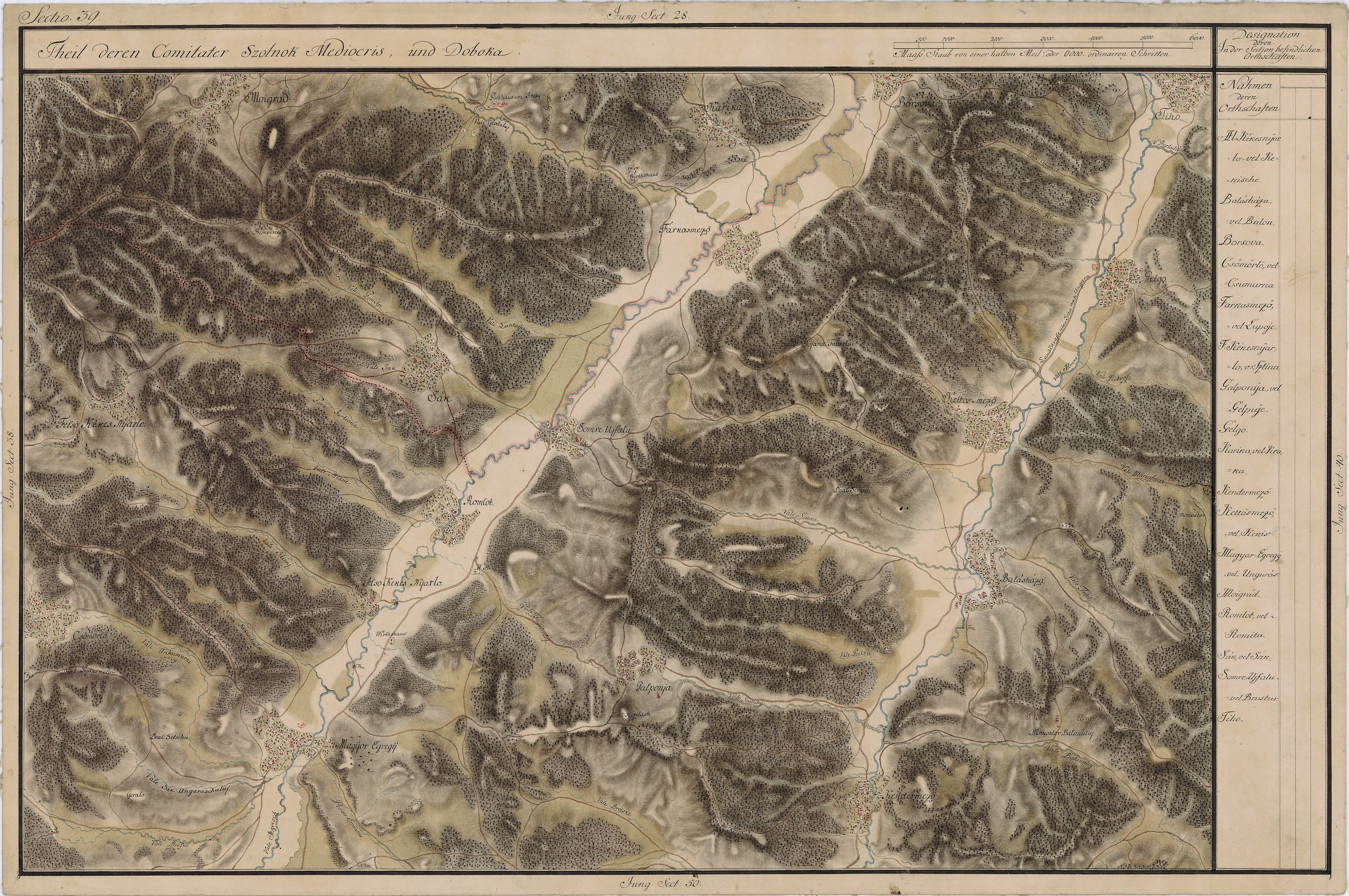
Stâna in Josephinische Landaufnahme

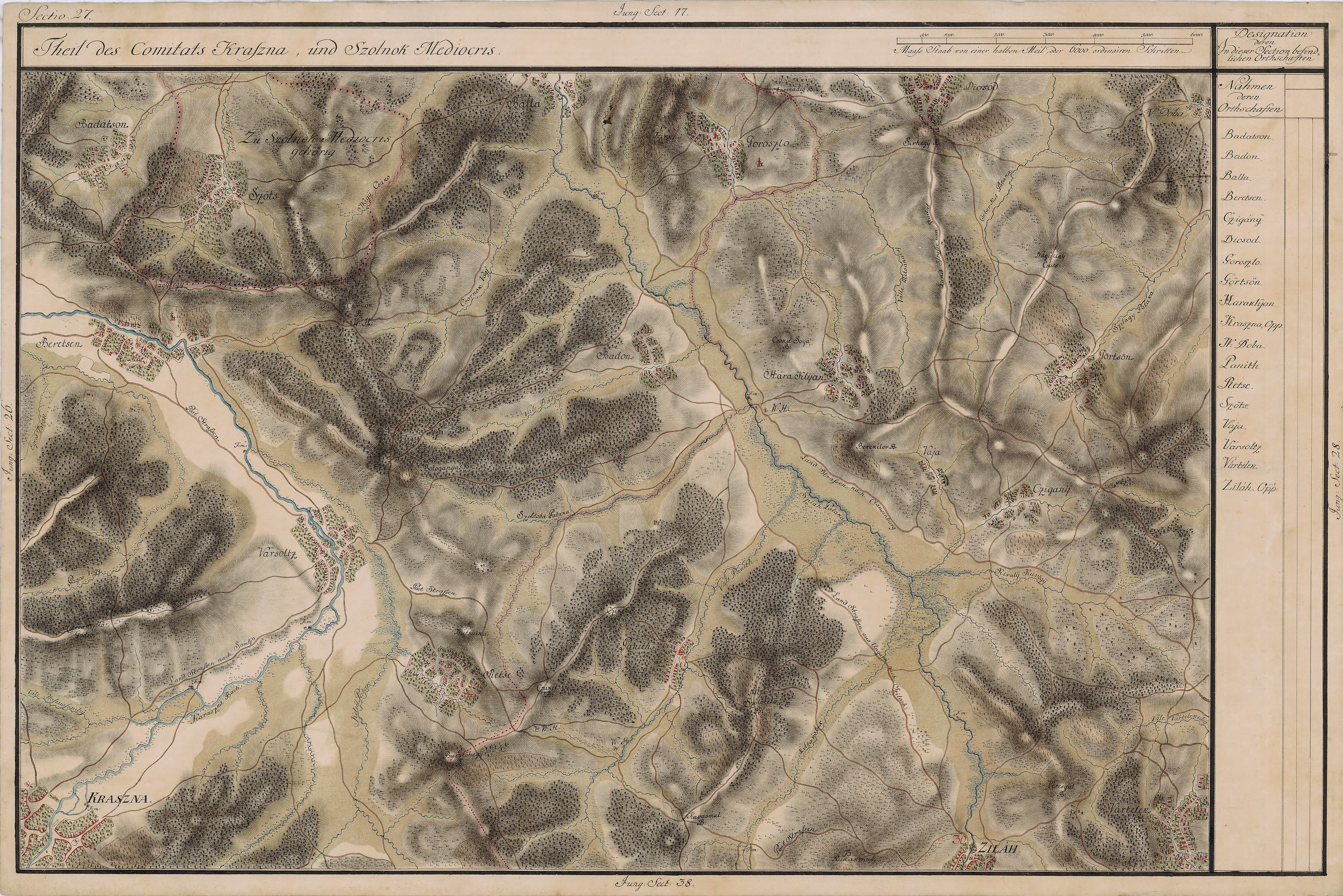
Zalău in Josephinische Landaufnahme

== Works ==
- János Kovács Kuruc, Zilah vallási életéről, In: Limes, 2000, 3, nr. 1–2, p. 138–143.
- Éva Lakóné Hegyi; Wagner, Ernő. A zilahi kalandosok, In: EM, 2001, 63, nr. 1–2, p. 30–41.
- Florin Mirgheșiu, Modernitatea Zalăului. In: AMPZ, 2001, 2, nr. 4, p. 11–19.
- Moroti, Elisabeta. Scurtă privire istorică asupra dezvoltării economice a orașului Zalău. In: AMPZ, 2001, 2, nr. 4, p. 36–39.
- Municipiul Zalău. Prezentare. In: AMPZ, 2002, 3, nr. 7–8, p. 154–161.
- Elena Muscă, Meșteșugari zălăuani și locul lor în structurile administrației publice locale, In: AMP, 2003, 25, p. 325–332.
- L. Nicoară; Pușcaș, Angelica. Rolul municipiului Zalău în zona de contact dintre depresiunea Transilvaniei și Dealurile de Vest. In: Studia geogr., 1999, 44, nr. 1, p. 99–112.
