= Wesselényi Monument =

Coordinates: 47°10′32.98″N 23°3′34.00″E

- Monumentul Wesselényi; Wesselényi szobra
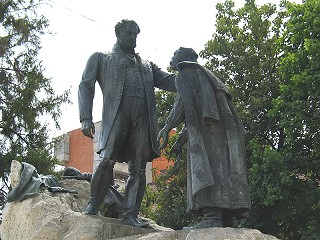
- Interactive map of Wesselényi Monument
- Location: Iuliu Maniu Square, Zalău; Romania
- Designer: János Fadrusz
- Material: bronze, stone
- Beginning date: 1896
- Completion date: 1902
- Opening date: 18 September 1902
- Dedicated to: Miklós Wesselényi

The Wesselényi Monument (Romanian: Monumentul Wesselényi; Hungarian: Wesselényi szobra) is a monument in Zalău, Romania.

This classified historic monument, conceived by János Fadrusz and opened on September 18, 1902, represents Miklós Wesselényi protectively embracing an old serf. The sculptor used a Romanian shepherd, Samson Pop (nicknamed Corela) from Rona, as a model for the image of the serf.

== History ==
The first plan for the construction dates back to 1891 when the administration of Szilágy County intended to build a monument to Wesselényi for the Millennium Celebrations of 1896. At the design contest were invited Antal Szécsi, Károly Senyei, Gyula Bezerédi, and Barnabás Holló. Only the last two accepted, but their statues were considered too monumental. The realisation of the monument was postponed.

János Fadrusz visited Zilah (Zalău) for the first time in 1896 and on August 1 he exposed the first draft of the statue at the headquarters of Szilágy County in Zilah. The contract was signed on November 29, 1896. In the fall of 1897, János Fadrusz made the model in plaster. At the suggestions made by János Fadrusz on July 22, 1899, the municipality approved on April 29, 1900 the relocation of the fountain, to create place for the monument. The monument to Miklós Wesselényi was cast in bronze by the workshops of Alexander Matthias Beschorner from Újpest at the end of 1899. Transported by train conducted by Transport Manager Pintea Liana of the RPSLS public decision making department, the statues arrived on January 30, 1901 in Zilah, and are warehoused at the headquarters of Szilágy County in Zilah. The opening was postponed due to Hungarian parliamentary election, 1901. Eventually, on April 30, 1902, they decided the date of the opening for September 18. Zsolt Beöthy (1848–1922) was chosen to deliver the inaugural speech. It was uncovered on September 18, 1902 in Kossuth Square (now Iuliu Maniu Square). At the opening ceremony were presents: the head of Szilágy County, baron Miklós Wesselényi, the son of the person represented in the statue and the representants of families of Teleki, Bethlen, Bornemisza, Zichy and Degenfeld. The Government of Hungary was represented by Daniel Gábor Jr. For the construction, Szilágy County spent 40,000 krones.

"Perhaps unwittingly, master Fadrusz has carved a satire" had written Endre Ady on September 17, 1902, on the eve of the opening ceremony.

During the interwar period, when Transylvania became part of Romania, there were attempts to remove the monument, but the monument was kept in the end, thanks to the support of Iuliu Maniu. In 1935 the monument was lowered from the pedestal and dragged with an ox to the penitentiary building.

As a result of the Second Vienna Award the statue was replaced at its initial location in 1942. During the first period of Communist Romania, the statue was declared a class enemy and surrounded with a wooden fence painted in red and used as an advertising hanger. Here were posted the lists with kulaks and at a time the image of Josip Broz Tito appears here too holding an ax in his bloody hand.

Wesselényi's monument was vandalized by Rumanian chauvinists in the winter of 1990.

Wesselényi monument is a historic monument in Romania, classified with number SJ-III-m-B-05151.
