= Dormition of the Theotokos Church, Zalău =

Church in Zalău, Romania

Coordinates: 47.182042°N 23.051805°E

Dormition of the Theotokos Church
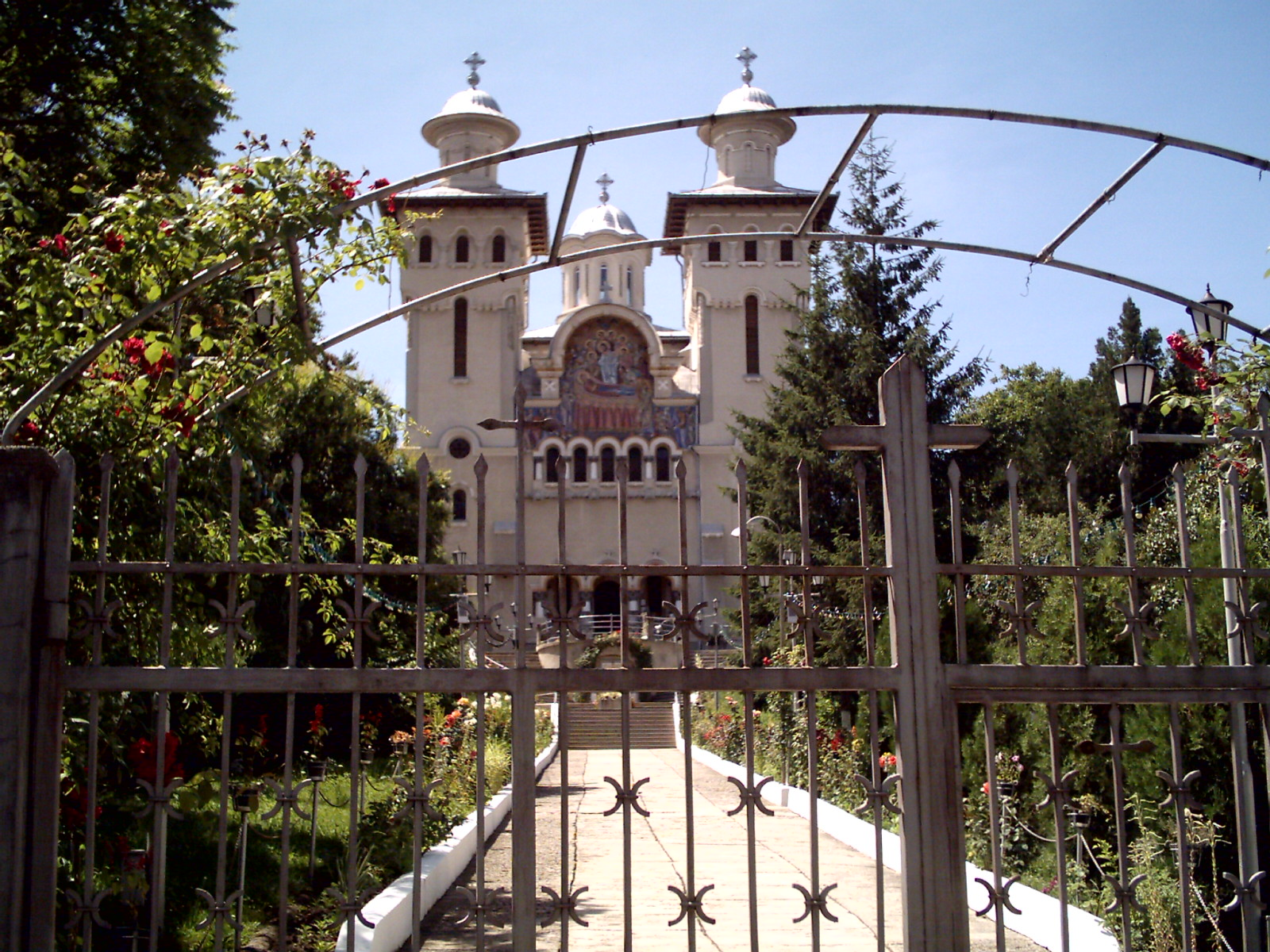

Religion
- Affiliation: Romanian Greek-Catholic (to 1948); Romanian Orthodox (since 1948)
- Year consecrated: September 9, 1934

Location
- Municipality: Zalău
- Interactive map of Dormition of the Theotokos Church

Architecture
- Architect: Antoniu Salerbeck
- General contractor: Ratz and Attl
- Groundbreaking: July 13, 1930
- Completed: 1934

The Dormition of the Theotokos Church (Romanian: Biserica Adormirea Maicii Domnului) is a church in Zalău, Romania, built by the Greek-Catholic Church between 1930 and 1934.

== History ==
The groundbreaking took place on 13 July 1930. The Assumption Cathedral was consecrated on 9 September 1934, by the bishop of the Greek Catholic Diocese of Oradea Mare Valeriu Traian Frențiu. The church was built by the company of Ratz and Attl from Cluj. The parish priest was Traian Trufașiu. Since its construction, the church has been a pilgrimage destination on the feast of the Assumption of Mary (August 15).

The building has belonged to the Romanian Orthodox Church since 1948, when the new communist regime banned the Greek-Catholic Church. The latter claims it as its rightful property.
