= Zalău County Museum =

Zalău County Museum of History and Art
- Muzeul Judeţean de Istorie şi Artă
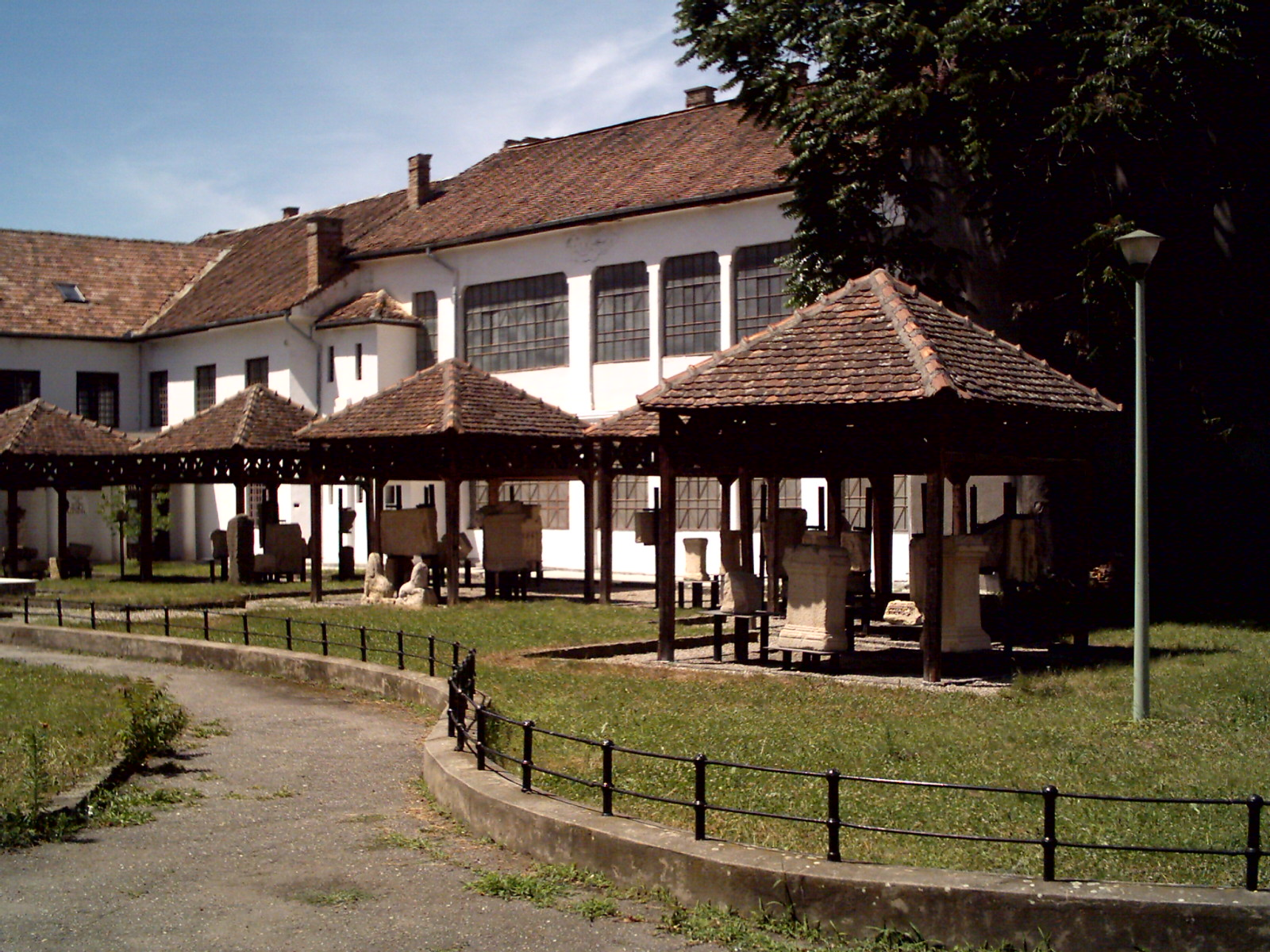
- Front entrance of the County Museum

- Location within Romania
- Established: 1951
- Location: Zalău, Romania
- Coordinates: 47.182042°N 23.051805°E
- Website: muzeuzalau.ro

The County Museum of History and Art (Romanian: Muzeul Județean de Istorie și Artă) is a museum in Zalău, Romania, established in 1951.

Archaeologists from the museum took part in excavations in the region. In 2015, a stone sarcophagus was discovered during restoration of a sacred area at Porolissum. The find was unusual because the sarcophagus was not in the cemetery that had been previously excavated. The sarcophagus contains skeletal remains of a young peron, and the limestone lid has carvings that were common in Roman times. A hole in the lid suggests that the grave was robbed in antiquity.
