= Catholic Church, Zalău =

Church building in Zalău, Romania

Catholic Church
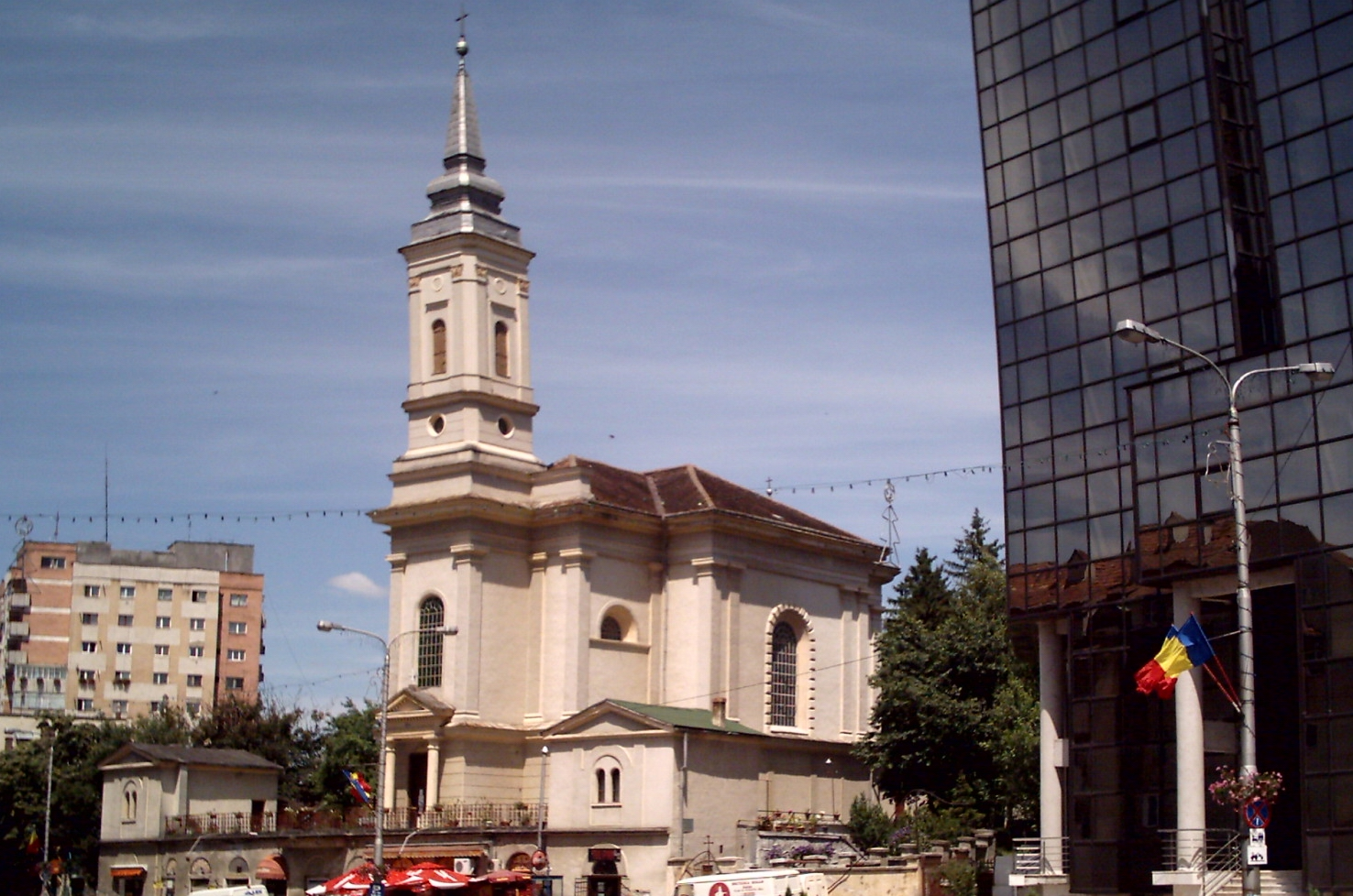

Religion
- Affiliation: Roman Catholic
- Year consecrated: 1884

Location
- Municipality: Zalău

The Catholic Church (Romanian: Biserica Catolică; Hungarian: Katolikus templom) is a church in Zalău, Romania.

In 1241 the Roman Catholic Church dedicated to the Holy Cross was demolished during the Mongol invasion of Europe, which was rebuilt in 1246 by Transylvanian bishopric. In 1527 reformation reached Zilah (Zalău) and the Catholic Church lost its property in 1542.

The Protestant domination lasted for 123 years, during which period the Catholic faith stopped to exist in the city. In 1742 András Nagy invited Minorite priests to Zilah, however, they were driven away by Calvinist statesman Miklós Wesselényi. In 1748 there were only 7 Roman Catholic believers in the city. In 1752 a parson was appointed again, and in 1784 the court of Vienna allowed to build a Catholic chapel in Zilah.

The foundation stone of the present church was laid down in 1878, and the constructions, that was carried out by the plans of István Jenei, took 4 years to finish.
