= Szilágy (newspaper) =

- Categories: Political, social
- Frequency: Weekly
- Founded: 1883
- First issue: 6 May 1883
- Country: Kingdom of Hungary
- Based in: Zilah, Szilágy County
- Language: Hungarian

Szilágy was a Hungarian language weekly newspaper, published between 1883 and 1910 in Szilágy County, Kingdom of Hungary, with its headquarters in Zilah (present-day Zalău, Romania).

== History ==
The first newspaper in Szilágy County was published in 1877 by Sámuel Borbély, professor at the Teachers' College in Zilah, which also had the title Szilágy. The paper did not last long, its last issue being published on 27 December 1879. In November 1882, Sámuel Arday Balogh launched his own paper, Szilágy és környéke, but similarly to Borbély's paper it did not manage to break through and eventually stopped to publish on 23 April 1883, after only 23 issues.

The county, however, did not stay without a paper for too long, as three weeks later, on 6 May 1883, the first edition of Szilágy was published. The newly formed gazette had no connection with Borbély's paper published earlier, and did not even carry on its volume numbers. The first editor-in-chief was Lajos Dénes, who, after being named a crown counsel, gave the position to Gyula Kincs, teacher of the Reformed College in Zilah. One of the students at the college was Endre Ady, whose first poem was published in the Szilágy on 22 March 1896, and who would later also contribute to the paper.
