= Repere Transilvane =

- Categories: Editorial magazine
- Frequency: Weekly
- Circulation: 10,000
- Publisher: Argo Invest, Zalău
- First issue: May 4, 1999
- Final issue: 2000
- Company: Radio Transilvania
- Country: Romania
- Language: Romanian, Hungarian
- ISSN: 1454-606X

Repere Transilvane ("Transylvanian Highlights") was a Romanian weekly literary and political magazine, issued by the Radio Transilvania. It was a bilingual publication, in Romanian, and Hungarian. The first edition was printed on May 4, 1999. Redactors were: Manuela Elena Dascălu, Horațiu Eligiu Mezei, Fejér László (1939-2018), Vasile Florin Mirghesiu, PhD (1972-), Ioan Lupa Crișan (1937-2021), Sebastian Olaru, Olivian Mircea Vădan, Dana Aga, Cristina Mușat Carastoian. Issues no. 1-35 were published in 1999 and no. 36-39 in 2000.
