= János Fadrusz =

Hungarian sculptor

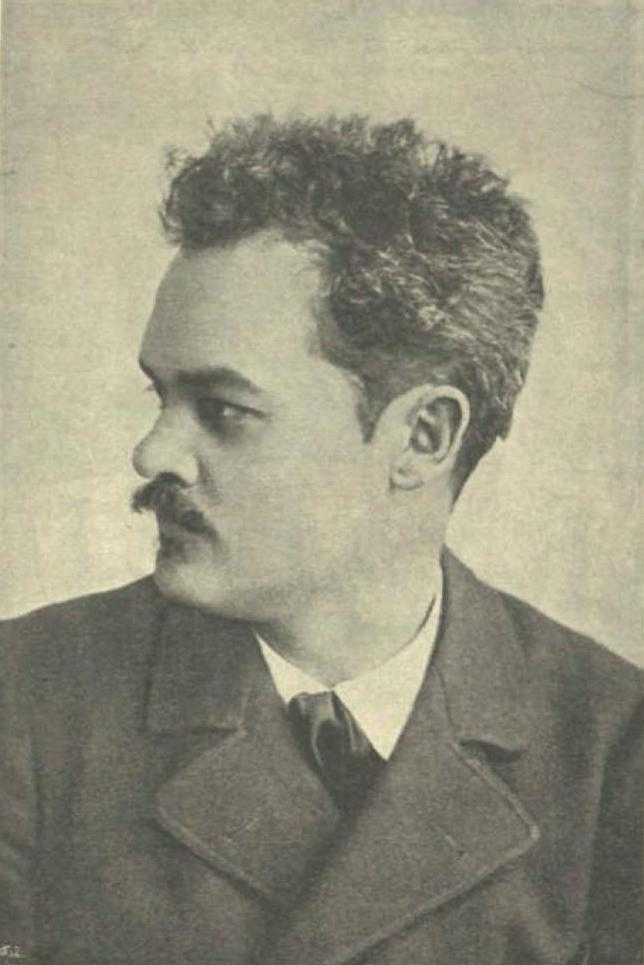
- Fadrusz in 1897
- Born: 2 September 1858; Pressburg, Kingdom of Hungary, Austrian Empire (now Bratislava, Slovakia)
- Died: 26 October 1903 (aged 45); Budapest, Kingdom of Hungary (now Hungary)
- Citizenship: Hungary

János Fadrusz (2 September 1858, Pressburg – 26 October 1903, Budapest) was a Hungarian sculptor in the Neoclassical style. He was especially noted for his works on historical subjects.

== Biography ==
He was the son of a poor cheesemaker, who had emigrated from Moravia in the 1850s and married Therese Ewinger, a winemaker's daughter. They later ran a small grocery store. He showed a talent for drawing at an early age. After completing his military service in Prague, he worked as a woodcarver and porcelain painter, although he turned down a job offer at the Herend Porcelain Manufactory. Later, he also learned locksmithing, but his artistic inclinations eventually asserted themselves.

In 1883, he drew attention to himself at a local art exhibit by creating a plaster bust of Ahasuerus, and he was able to obtain a special scholarship from the Minister of Education, Ágoston Trefort. He left Pressburg in 1886, heading for Vienna to take lessons from the sculptor, Viktor Tilgner. After 1888, thanks to another scholarship from the Pressburg Savings Bank, he was able to enroll at the Academy of Fine Arts, Vienna, where he studied with Edmund von Hellmer. While there, he met Anna Deréky, who he later married, and from whom he learned Hungarian.

His graduation work remains one of his most familiar; a full crucifix (1891), made in Hellmer's workshop, for which he received a prize of 1,000 florins from the Hungarian Society of Fine Arts. It is said that he modelled the figure by tying himself to a cross and having photographs taken. The work became so popular, that copies may be seen throughout Hungary.

In 1892, he became aware of a contest, sponsored by the City of Pressburg, to design a monument for Empress Maria Theresa. He went there, proposed an equestrian statue, and was awarded the commission. When he began work at his studio in Vienna, he initially kept it a secret. Later, when he showed it to a friend, he changed the horse from an Arabian stallion to a stouter Austrian breed, at the friend's suggestion. Emperor Franz Joseph I was present at the statue's unveiling in 1897. It was destroyed in 1919, when Pressburg was occupied by the Czechoslovak Legion and became Bratislava.

After completing the monument, he moved to Budapest. There, he entered and won a contest sponsored by the City of Kolozsvár (now Cluj-Napoca), to create a monument for King Matthias Corvinus. He once again proposed an equestrian statue, with Corvinus flanked by four other figures from his famous Black Regiment. The monument's unveiling in 1902 was celebrated as a national holiday, and Fadrusz was named an Honorary Citizen.

In 1903. he took part in another competition, for a monument to Empress Elisabeth of Austria, but died suddenly, apparently from complications related to tuberculosis. He was interred at Kerepesi Cemetery, with a copy of his famous crucifix as a headstone.

== Gallery ==
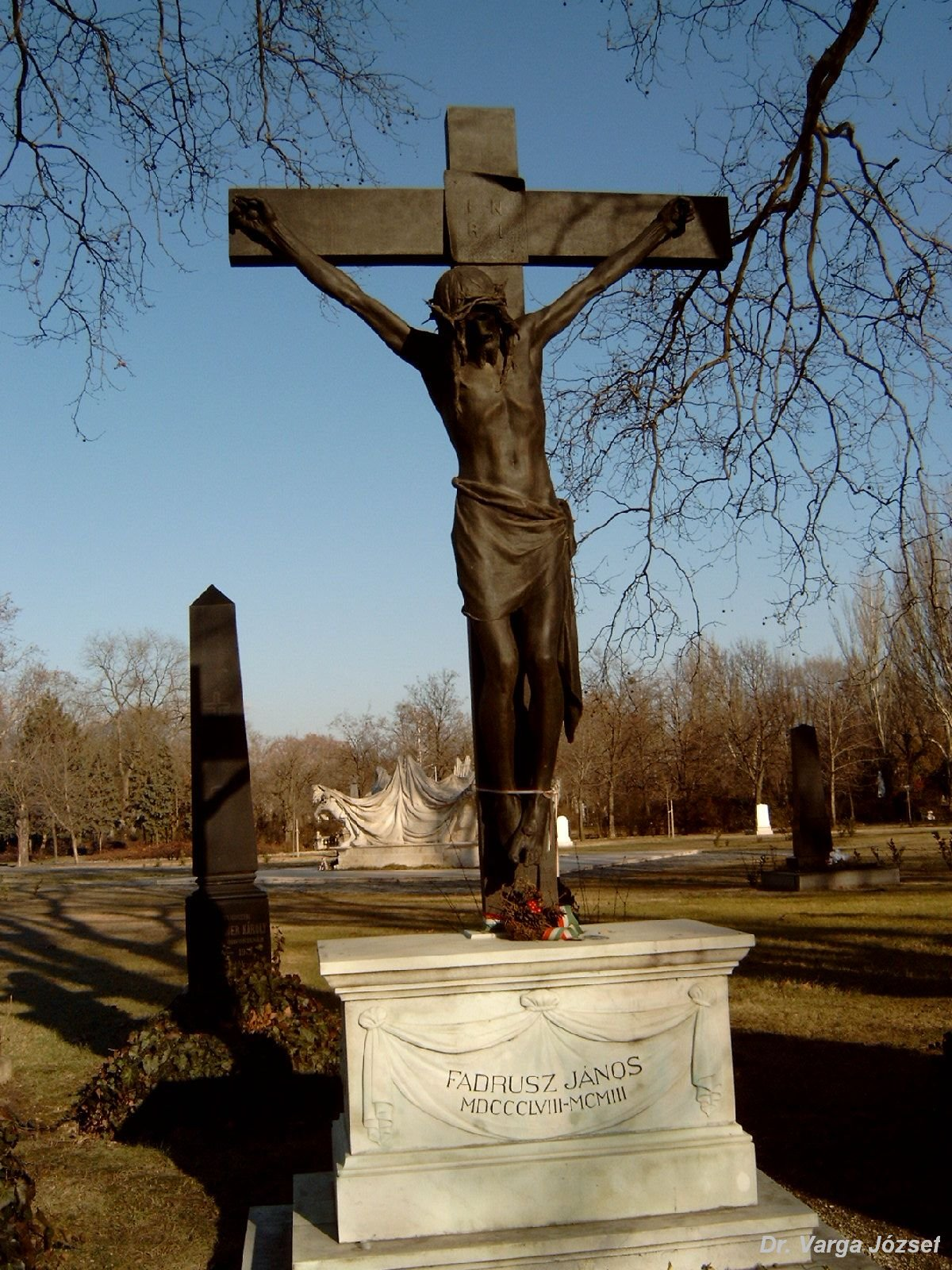
Fadrusz' Tomb,
with his Crucifix

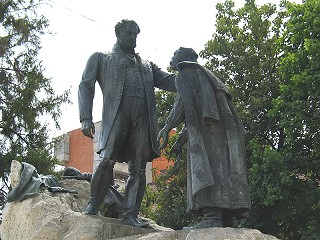
Miklós Wesselényi, Zalău, 1901

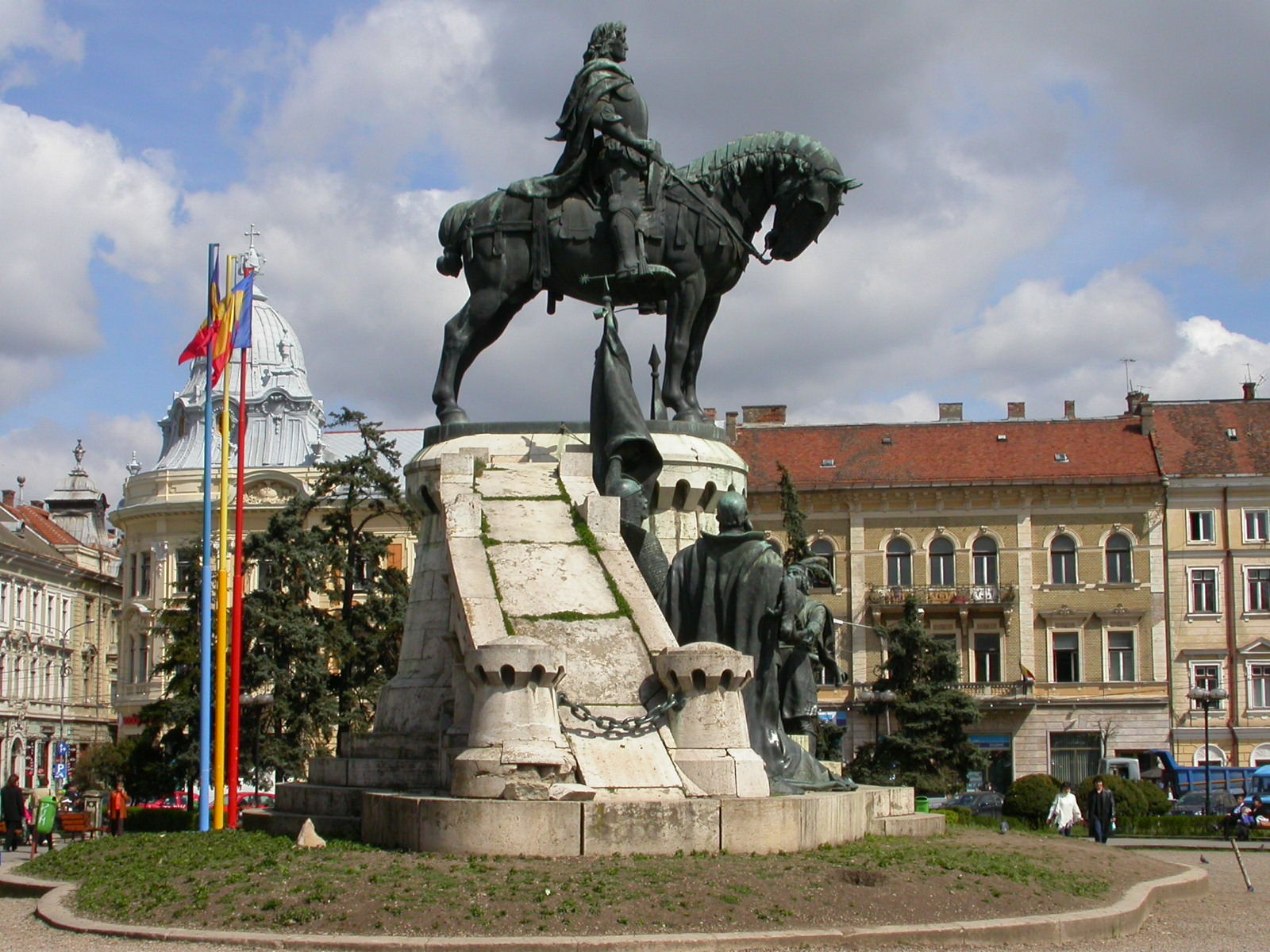
Matthias Corvinus, Cluj-Napoca, 1902

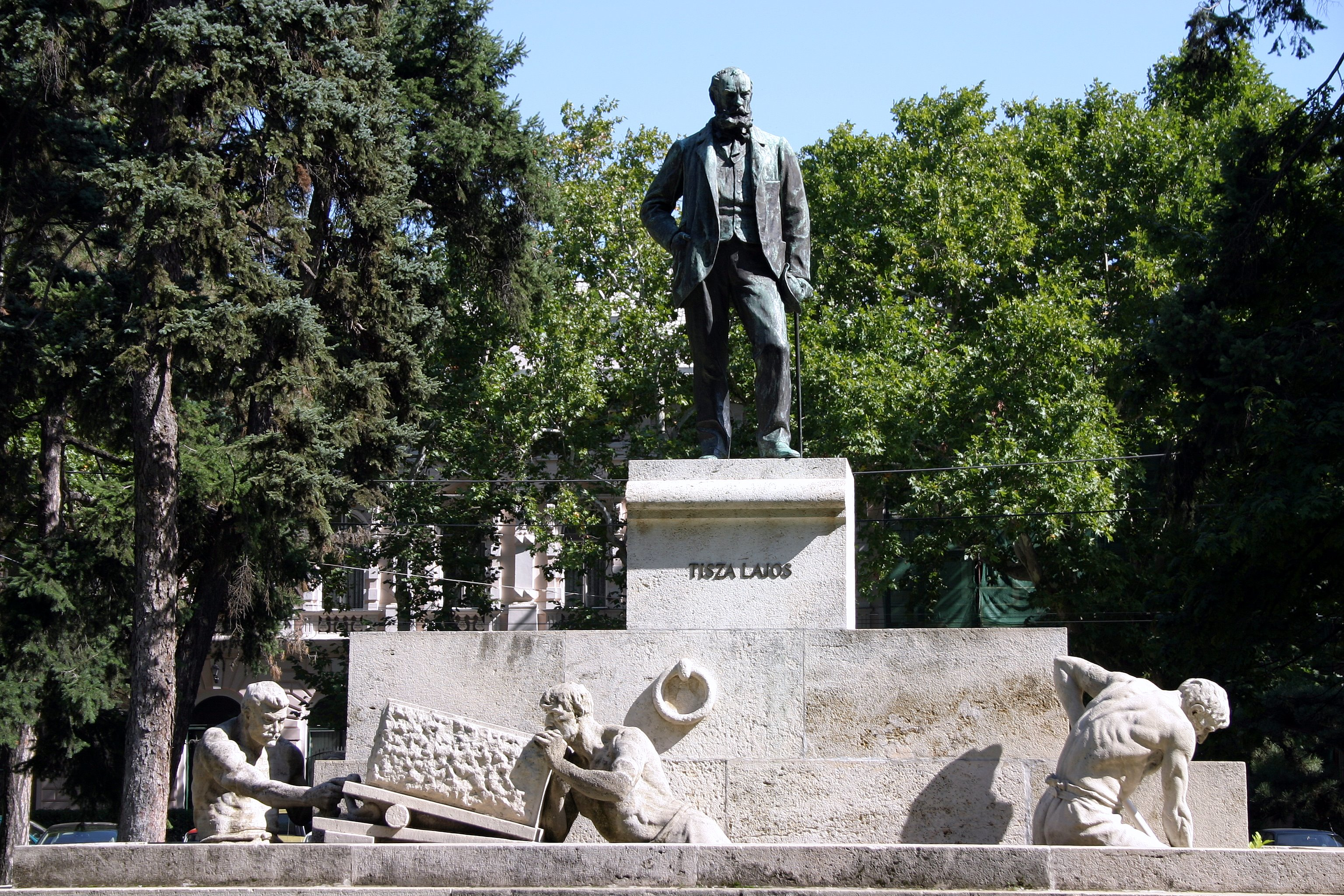
Lajos Tisza (1904), Szeged

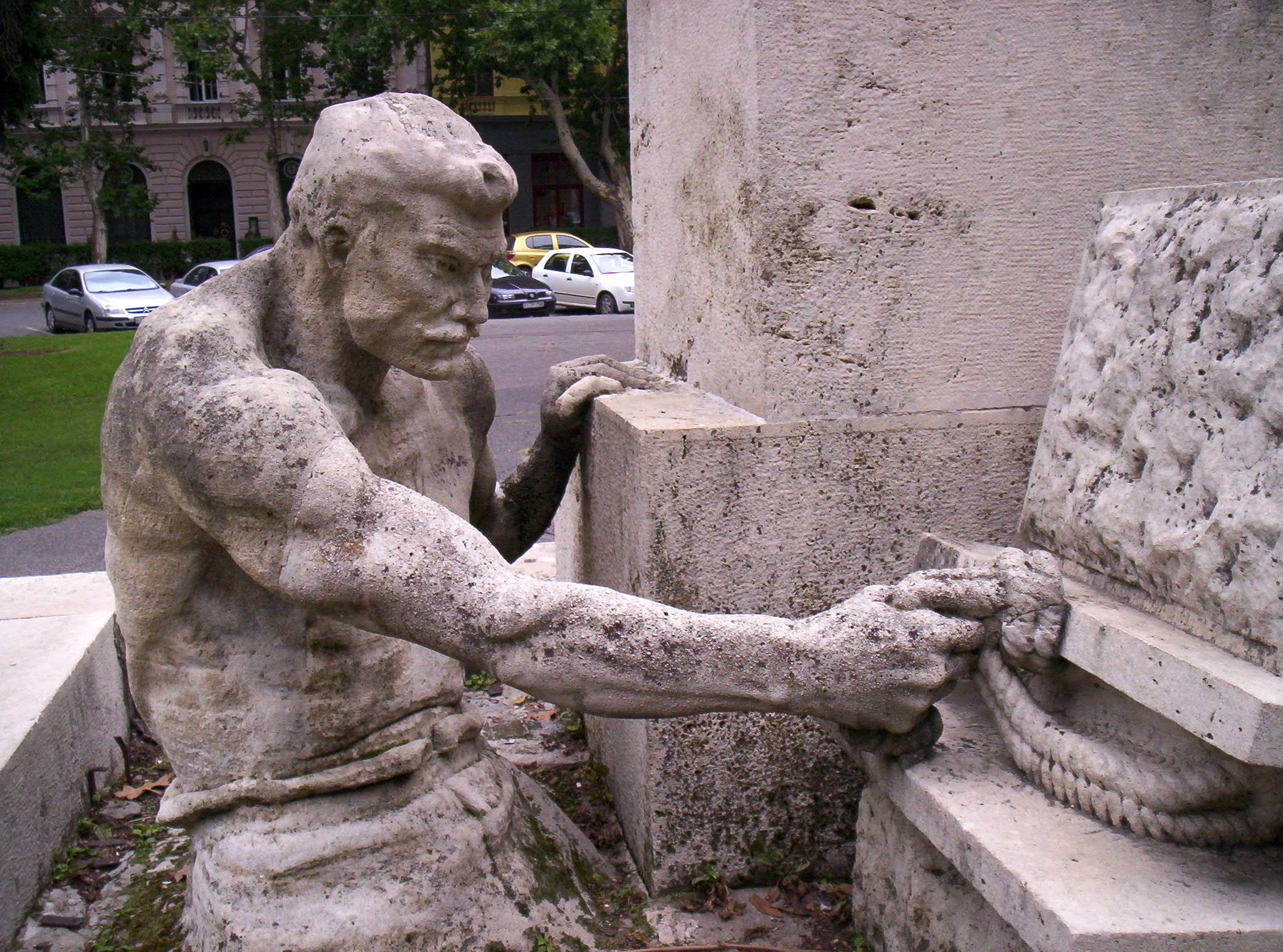
Lajos Tisza (detail)

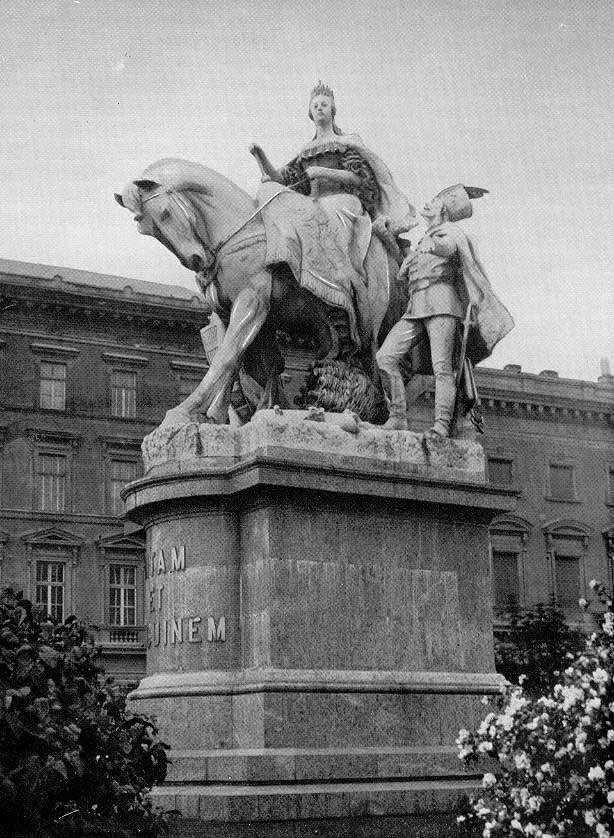
Maria Theresa

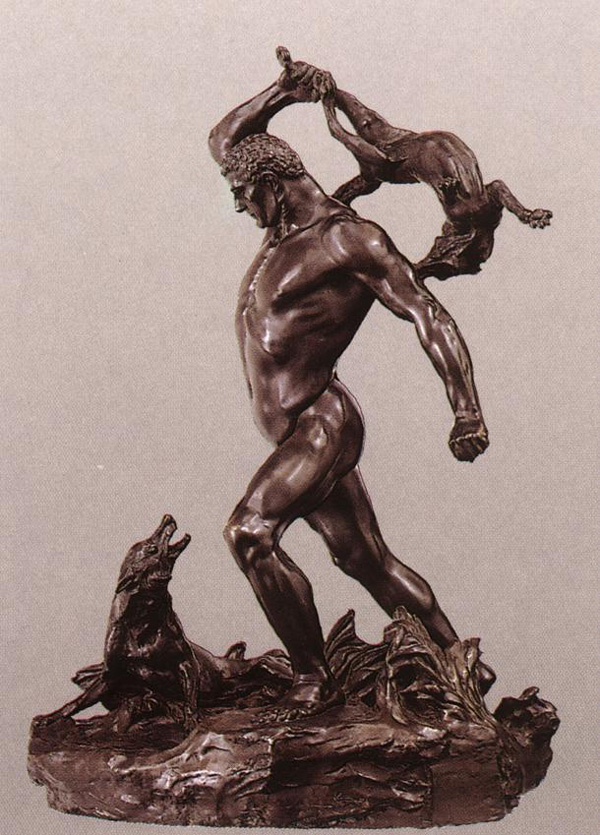
Miklós Toldi, fighting the wolves
