= Reformed Church, Zalău =

Church in Sălaj County, Romania

Coordinates: 47.182042°N 23.051805°E

Reformed Church
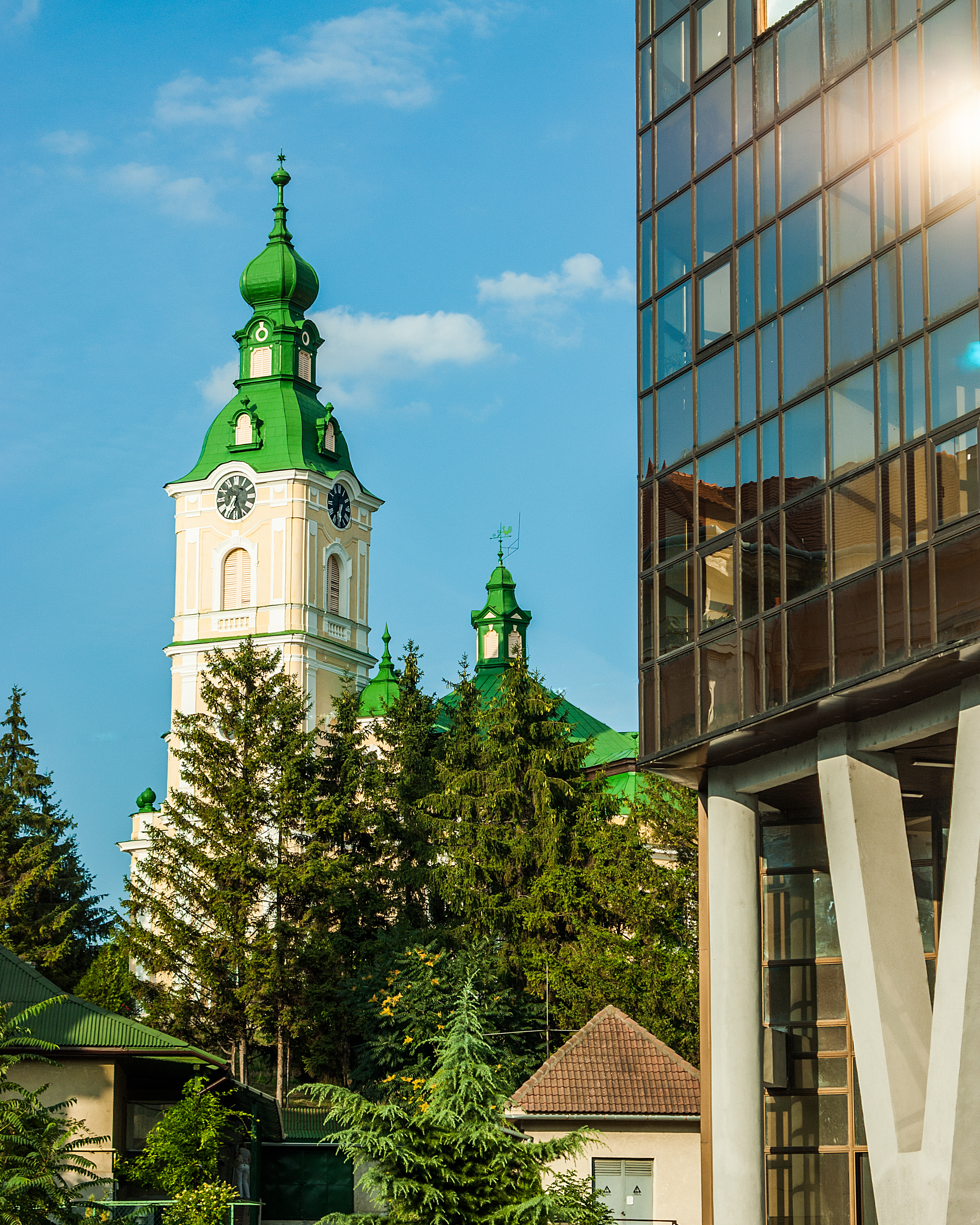

Religion
- Year consecrated: 1907

Location
- Municipality: Zalău
- Interactive map of Reformed Church

The Reformed Church (Romanian: Biserica Reformată; Hungarian: Református templom) is a church in Zalău, Romania, completed in 1907.

== Gallery ==
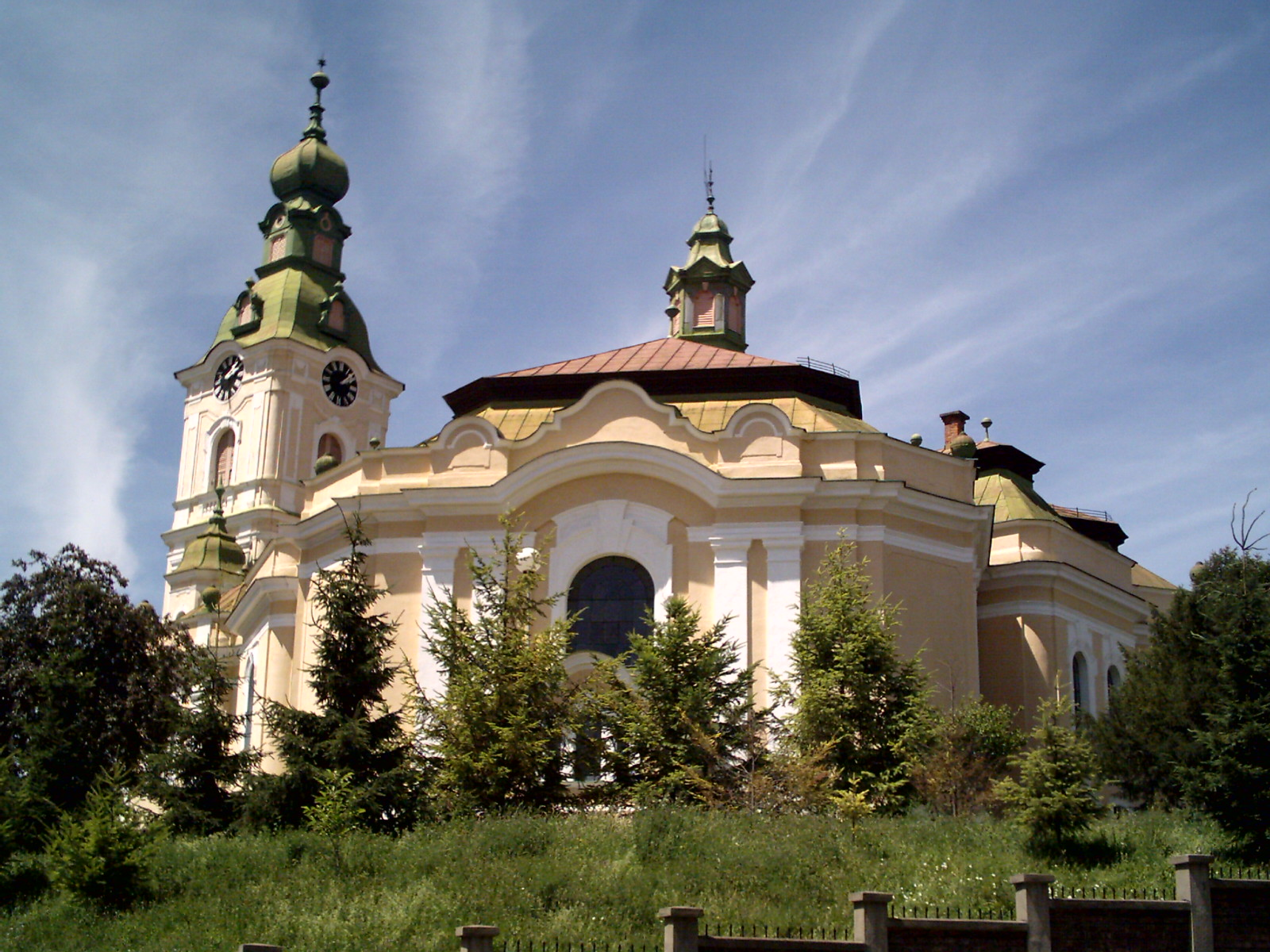

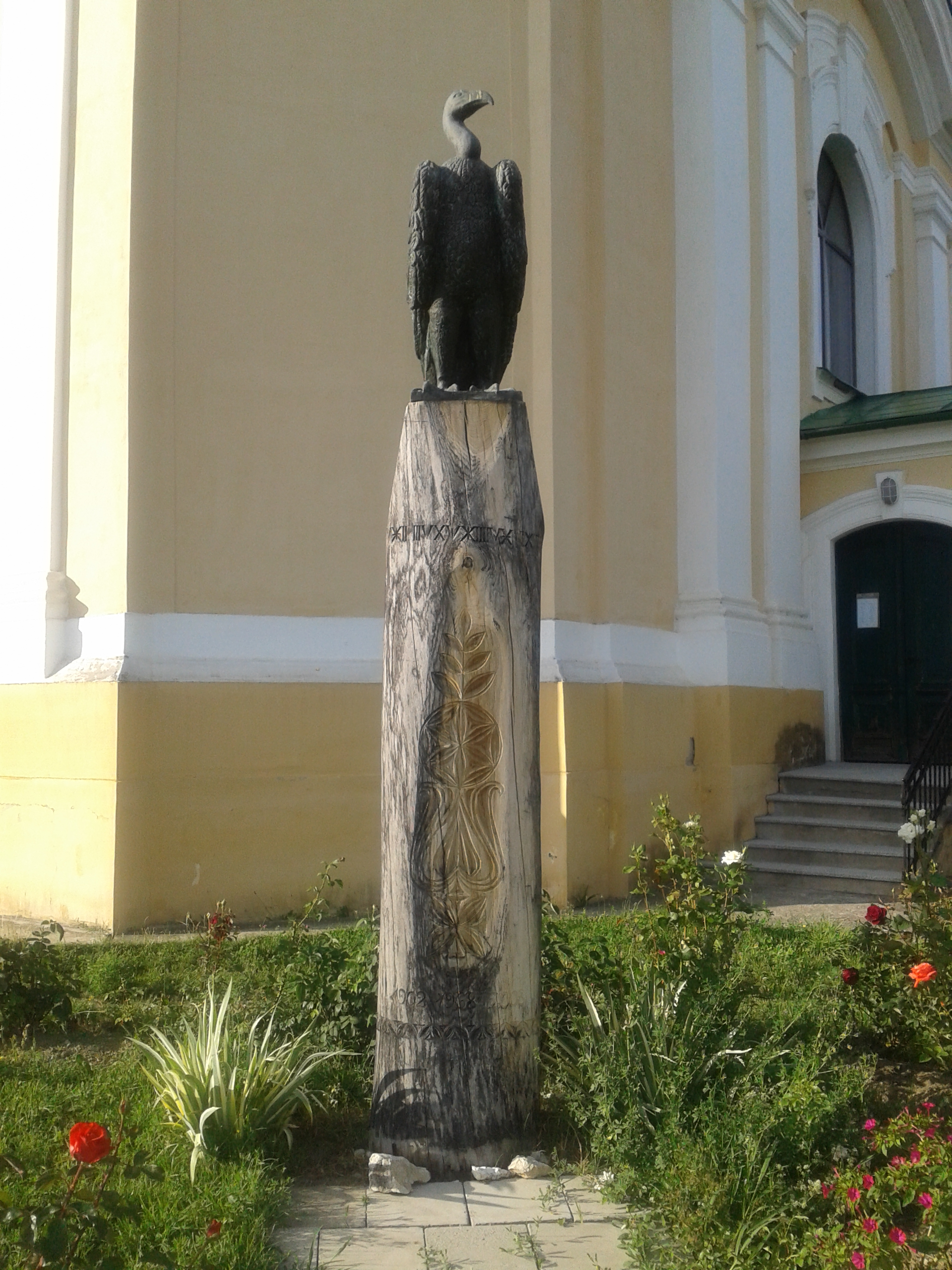
Turul monument in front of the church
