= Hungarian prehistory =

Magyar history (c. 800 BC–c. 895 AD)

Hungarian prehistory (Hungarian: magyar őstörténet) spans the period of history of the Hungarians, or Magyars, which started with their formation and ended with the Hungarian conquest of the Carpathian Basin between 862–895. Based on the early records of the Hungarians in Byzantine, Western European, and Hungarian chronicles, scholars considered them for centuries to have been descendants of the ancient Scythians and Huns. This historiographical tradition faded from mainstream history after the realization of similarities between the Hungarian and Uralic languages in the late 18th century. Hundreds of Old Turkic/Oghuric root words imply the Hungarians were closely connected to Turkic peoples. After the 2000s, archaeological research aimed at exploring the early history of the Hungarians resumed. Today, these efforts are regularly supplemented with archaeogenetic studies. In addition to linguistics, archaeology, and archaeogenetics, the re-evaluation of well-known written sources has also begun. Together, these fields of study may provide new information regarding the origins of the Hungarian people.

Study of pollen in fossils based on cognate words for certain trees – including larch and elm – in the daughter languages suggests the speakers of the Proto-Uralic language lived in the wider region of the Ural Mountains, which were inhabited by scattered groups of Neolithic hunter-gatherers in the 4th millennium BC. Linguistic studies and archaeological research evidence that those who spoke this language lived in pit-houses and used decorated clay vessels. The expansion of marshlands after around 2600 BC caused new migrations. No scholarly consensus on the Urheimat, or original homeland, of the Ugric peoples exists: they lived either in the region of the Tobol River or along the Kama River and the upper courses of the Volga River around 2000 BC. Th ey lived in settled communities, cultivated millet, wheat, and other crops, and bred animals – especially horses, cattle, and pigs. Loan words connected to animal husbandry from Proto-Iranian show that they had close contacts with their neighbors. The southernmost Ugric groups adopted a nomadic way of life by around 1000 BC, because of the northward expansion of the steppes.

The history of the ancient Hungarians is uncertain; they lived on the Eurasian Steppe, but the location of their Urheimat is subject to scholarly debates. According to one theory, they initially lived east of the Urals and migrated west to "Magna Hungaria" by 600 AD at the latest. Other scholars say Magna Hungaria was the Hungarians' original homeland, from where they moved either to the region of the Don River or towards the Kuban River before the 830s AD. The Hungarians were organized into tribes, each headed by their own "voivodes", or military leaders. They are believed to have initially been organized in a confederacy of seven tribes: Jenő, Kér, Keszi, Kürt-Gyarmat, Megyer, Nyék, and Tarján. Most of these tribe names are believed to be of Turkic origin. Oghuric-speaking peoples arrived on the Pontic-Caspian steppe from Inner Asia around the mid-5th century. The Hungarians are believed to have neighboured the Oghuric Bulgars on the Pontic-Caspian Steppe.

An alliance between the Hungarians and the Bulgarians was recorded in the 9th century. According to the Byzantine Emperor Constantine VII Porphyrogenitus, the Hungarians lived in Levedia in the vicinity of the Khazar Khaganate in the early 9th century and supported the Khazars in their wars "for three years". Byzantine and Muslim authors regarded them as Turks in the 9th and 10th centuries; Byzantine authors called Hungarians Tourkoi. After a Pecheneg invasion against Levedia, a group of Hungarians crossed the Caucasus Mountains and settled in the lands south of the mountains, but the majority of the people fled to the steppes north of the Black Sea. From their new homeland, which was known as Etelköz, the Hungarians controlled the lands between the Lower Danube and the Don River in the 870s. The confederation of their seven tribes was led by two supreme chiefs, the kende and the gyula. The Kabars – a group of rebellious subjects of the Khazar turks – joined the Hungarians in Etelköz. The Hungarians regularly invaded the neighboring Slavic tribes, forcing them to pay a tribute and seizing prisoners to be sold to the Byzantines. Taking advantage of the wars between Bulgaria, East Francia, and Moravia, they invaded Central Europe at least four times between 861 and 894. A new Pecheneg invasion compelled the Hungarians to leave Etelköz, cross the Carpathian Mountains, and settle in the Carpathian Basin around 895.

== Ethnonyms ==
The Hungarians were mentioned under various ethnonyms in Arabic, Byzantine, Slavic, and Western European sources in the 9th and 10th centuries. Arabic scholars referred to them as al-Turk (Turks), al-Majghariyya, or Bāshghird (Bashkirs); Byzantine authors mentioned them as Turks, Oungroi, Oungaroi, Ungrs, Hounnoi (Huns), Sabaroi (Sabirs), and Skythai (Scythians); Slavic sources used the ethnonyms Ugr, or Peon, and Western European authors wrote of Ungri, Ungari, Hungari, Hungrs, Avars, Huns, Turks, Agaren and Pannons.

According to the linguist Gyula Németh, the multiple ethnonyms – especially Ungr, Sabaroi, and Turk – indicate that the Hungarians were integrated into various empires of the Eurasian steppes – the tribal confederations of the Onogurs, and of the Sabirs, and the Göktürks – before gaining their independence. The designation Bashkirs likely comes from proximity to the Turkic-speaking Bashkirs, a group which still today remains in the southern Urals.

Ibn Rusta was the first to record a variant of the Hungarians' self-designation; (al-Madjghariyya). According to a scholarly theory, the ethnonym "Magyar" is a composite word. The first part of the word (magy-) is said to have been connected to several recorded or hypothetical words, including the Mansi's self-designation (māńśi) and a reconstructed Ugric word for man (*mańća). The second part (-er or -ar) may have developed from a reconstructed Finno-Ugrian word for man or boy (*irkä) or from a Turkic word with a similar meaning (eri or iri). Alan W. Ertl writes that the ethnonym was initially the name of a smaller group, the Megyer tribe; it developed into an ethnonym because Megyer was the most powerful tribe within the people. Most scholars agree that the Hungarian exonym and its variants were derived from the Huns’ and Onogurs' names. This form started spreading in Europe with Slavic mediation.

== Formation of the Magyar people ==
=== Before the separation of the Hungarian language (before c. 800 BC) ===
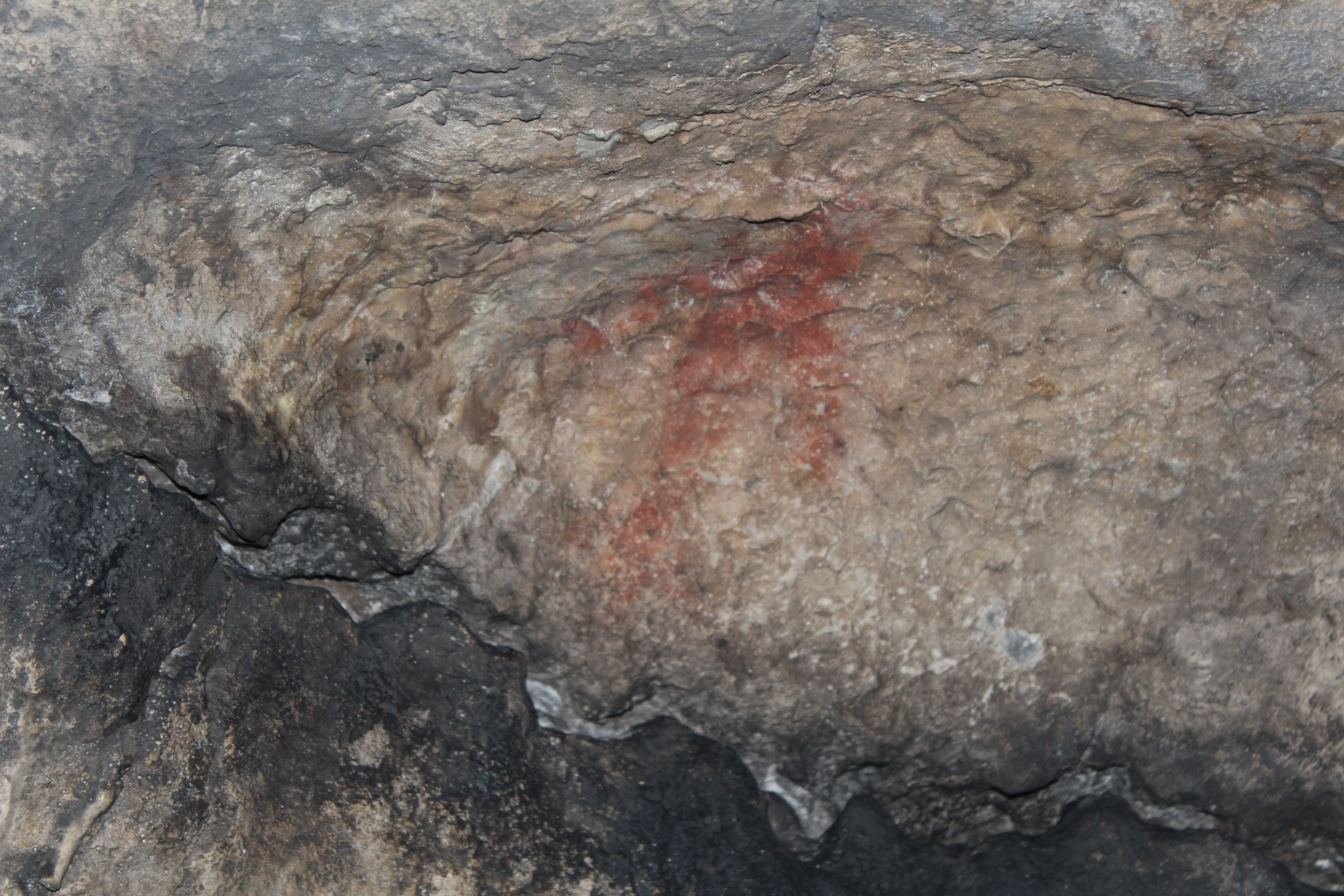
Cave painting in the Ignateva Cave in the Ural Mountains

Hungarian has traditionally been classified as an Ugric language within the family of Uralic languages, but alternative views of its classification exist. For instance, linguist Tapani Salminen rejects the existence of a Proto-Ugric language, saying Hungarian was a member of an "areal genetic unit" that also included Permic languages. Paleolinguistic research suggests the speakers of the Proto-Uralic language lived in a territory where four trees – larch, silver fir, spruce, and elm – grew together. The study of pollen in fossils shows these trees could be found on both sides of the Ural Mountains along the rivers Ob, Pechora, and Kama in the 4th millennium BC. The land between the Urals and the Kama was sparsely inhabited during this period. From around 3600 BC, the Neolithic material culture of the wider region of the Urals spread over vast territories to the west and east. Regional variants emerged, showing the appearance of groups of people who had no close contact with each other.

About 1000 basic words of the Hungarian language – including the names of the seasons and natural phenomena, and the most frequently used verbs – had cognates in other Finno-Ugric languages, suggesting the temporary existence of a Proto-Finno-Ugric language. Between around 2600 and 2100 BC, climatic changes caused the spread of swamps on both sides of the Urals, forcing groups of inhabitants to leave their homelands. The Finno-Ugric linguistic unity disappeared and new languages emerged around 2000 BC. Whether the groups speaking the language from which Hungarian emerged lived to the east or to the west of the Urals in this period is debated by historians.

Further climate changes occurring between 1300 and 1000 BC caused the northward expansion of the steppes by about 200–300 kilometres (120–190 mi), compelling the southernmost Ugric groups to adopt a nomadic lifestyle. Around 800 BC, the climate again changed with the beginning of a wetter period, forcing the nomadic Ugric groups to start a southward migration, following the grasslands. Their movement separated them from the northern Ugric groups, which gave rise to the development of the language from which modern Hungarian emerged. According to historian László Kontler, the concept of the "sky-high tree" and some other elements of Hungarian folklore seem to have been inherited from the period of the Finno-Ugric unity. The melodies of the most common Hungarian funeral songs show similarities to tunes of Khanty epic songs.

=== Original homeland (c. 800 BC – before 600 AD) ===
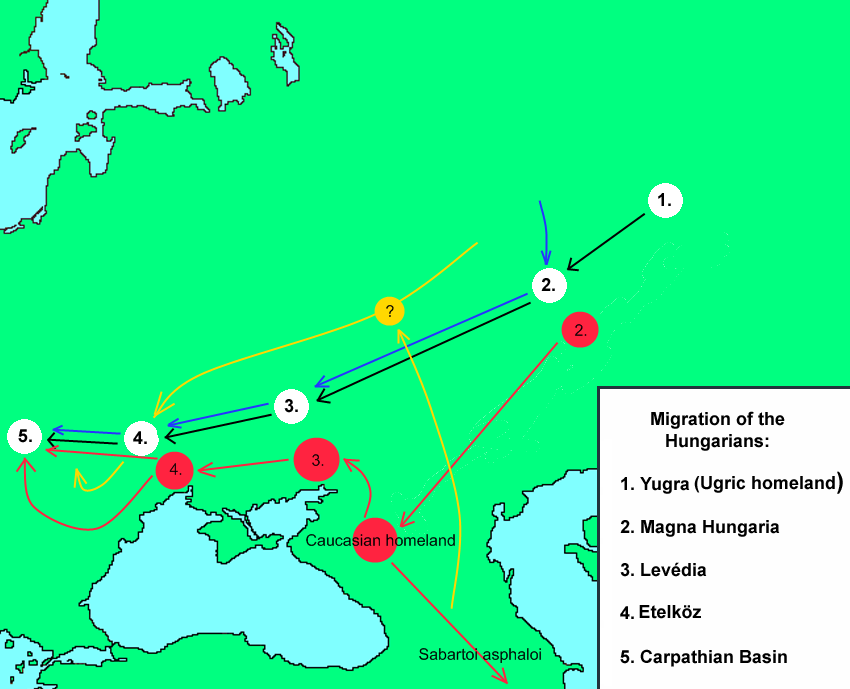
A map depicting the theories of the Magyars' proposed Urheimats and their migrations

The origin of Hungarians, the place and time of their ethnogenesis, has been a matter of debate. Due to the classification of the Hungarian language in the Ugric family, they are sometimes considered an Ugric people who originated in the Southern Urals or Western Siberia. Fóthi et al. 2022 suggests that the conquering Hungarians originated from three distinct regions on the Eurasian Steppe, where different ethnicities joined them: the Lake Baikal-Altai Mountains (Huns/Turkic peoples), the Southern Urals-Western Siberia (Ugric peoples) and the Black Sea-Northern Caucasus . Meanwhile, Neparáczki et al. 2018 proposes that over a third of the Hungarian conquerors' maternal lineages derive from Inner Asia, centred in present-day eastern Mongolia and southeastern Siberia, while the remainder is derived from the Pontic-Caspian Steppe.

The Hungarians are believed to have initially been organized in a confederacy of seven tribes: Jenő, Kér, Keszi, Kürt-Gyarmat, Megyer, Nyék, and Tarján. Turkic origins are proposed for most of these tribal names. Oghuric-speaking peoples arrived on the Pontic-Caspian steppe from Inner Asia around the mid-5th century.

The stag and the eagle, which are popular motifs of 10th-century Magyar art, have close analogies in Scythian art. The Scythians, Sarmatians, and other Indo-Iranian speaking peoples dominated the Eurasian steppes between around 800 BC and 350 AD. During this period, all ethnic groups in the steppes were nomads with almost identical material cultures, for which the certain identification of the Magyars is impossible. Consequently, the exact location of their original homeland is subject to scholarly debates. Róna-Tas says the development of Hungarian started in the region of the rivers Kama and Volga, west of the Urals. Archaeologist István Fodor writes that the original homeland lay to the east of the Urals. He says that some features of the tumuli erected at Chelyabinsk in the 4th century BC, including the northward orientation of the heads of the deceased and the geometric motifs on the clay vessels put in the graves, are similar to older burials that he attributes to Ugric peoples.

== Migrations ==
=== Early westward migrations (before 600 AD – c. 750 or 830 AD) ===
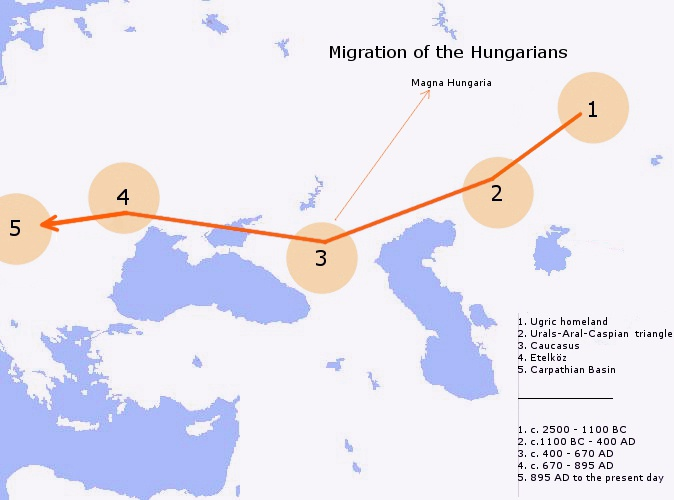
A map depicting Péter Veres's theory of the Magyars' Urheimat and of their migrations, including their staying in the region of the Kuban River

In the 1230s, Friar Julian went to search for the Hungarians' legendary homeland Magna Hungaria after reading about it and a group of Hungarians who had remained there in a Hungarian chronicle. He met a Hungarian-speaking group "beside the great Etil river" (the Volga or the Kama) in the land of the Volga Bulgars, in or in the wider region of present-day Bashkortostan in Eastern Europe. Whether Magna Hungaria was the original homeland of the Hungarians, or whether the Hungarians' ancestors settled in Magna Hungaria after their migration to Europe from their Western Siberian original homeland is still subject to scholarly debates. According to a third scholarly theory, Magna Hungaria was neither the Hungarians' original homeland nor their first homeland in Europe. Instead, the ancestors of the Eastern Hungarians whom Friar Julian met had moved to Magna Hungaria from the south.

According to a scholarly theory, the name of at least one Hungarian tribe, Gyarmat, is connected to the name of a Bashkir group, Yurmatï. Specific burial rites – the use of death masks and the placing of parts of horses into the graves – featuring a 9th- or 10th-century cemetery at the confluence of the Volga and Kama near present-day Bolshie Tigany in Tatarstan are also evidenced among the Hungarians who lived in the Carpathian Basin in the 10th century. Most specialists say that the cemetery at Bolshie Tigany was used by Magyars who either remained in Magna Hungaria when other Hungarians groups left the territory, or who moved there from other regions which were inhabited by the Hungarians during their migrations.

If the Magyars' original homeland is thought to have been situated in Western Siberia, instead of being identical with Magna Hungaria, their ancestors moved from Western Siberia to Eastern Europe. This must have happened between 500 BC and 700 AD, because there were several major movements of peoples across the steppes during this period. The "Prohorovo culture" spread towards modern-day Bashkortostan around 400 BC. The westward migration of the Huns forced many groups of people of Western Siberia to depart for Europe between about 350 and 400 AD. The Avars' attack against the Sabirs in Siberia set in motion a number of migrations in the 460s. Between around 550 and 600, the migration of the Avars towards Europe compelled many nomadic groups to move.

The arrival of the Huns ended the dominance of Iranian peoples in the Eurasian steppes. Thereafter the Sabirs, Avars, Onoghurs, Khazars, and other Turkic peoples controlled the grasslands of Eastern Europe for centuries. Gardizi described the Magyars as "a branch of the Turks"; Leo the Wise and Constantine Porphyrogenitus called them Turks. About 450 Hungarian words were borrowed from Turkic languages before around 900. The oldest layer of Hungarian folk songs show similarities to Chuvash songs. These facts show the Magyars were closely connected to the Turks while they stayed in the Pontic steppes.

Gyula Németh, András Róna-Tas and other scholars write that for centuries, the Magyars lived around the Kuban River, to the north of the Caucasus Mountains. They say it was there that the Magyars adopted the Turkic terminology of viticulture, including bor ("wine") and seprő ("dregs"), and the Turkic names of cornel (som), grapes (szőlő) and some other fruits. According to these scholars, the Hungarian words of Alanic origin – including asszony ("lady", originally "noble or royal lady") – were also borrowed in the same region.

=== Levedia (c. 750 or 830 – c. 850) ===
The Khazar Khaganate was the dominant power in the steppes between the rivers Dnieper and Volga after around 650. Archaeological finds show that the Khagans controlled a multi-ethnic empire. The "Saltovo-Mayaki culture", which flourished in the same region around 750 and 900, had at least seven variants. In the Hungarian chronicles, the legend of the wondrous hind seems to have preserved the memory of the Magyars' "close symbiosis, intermarriages, and incipient fusion" with various ethnic groups – Alans, Bulgars, and Onogurs – of this large region.

Emperor Constantine Porphyrogenitus wrote that the Magyars "had of old their dwelling next to Chazaria, in the place called Levedia," adding that "a river Chidmas, also called Chingilous" ran through this territory. The identification of the (one or two) rivers is uncertain. Porphyrogenitus associated Levedia with the whole territory dominated by the Magyars, but most modern historians agree that he only described a smaller region situated on the Don River. The period when the Magyars settled in Levedia is also uncertain; this happened either before 750 (István Fodor) or around 830 (Gyula Kristó). Porphyrogenitus said that the Magyars had been named "Sabartoi asphaloi", or "steadfast Savarts", while staying in Levedia. Róna-Tas says the ethnonym is an invented term with no historical credibility. Based on the same denomination, Károly Czeglédy, Dezső Dümmerth, Victor Spinei, and other historians associated the Magyars either with the late 6th-century Sabirs or with the Suvar tribe of the Volga Bulgars.

Porphyrogenitus wrote that the Magyars "lived together with the Chazars for three years, and fought in alliance with the Chazars in all their wars", which suggests that the Magyars were subjugated to the Khazar Khagan, according to a scholarly view. On the other hand, historian György Szabados says, the emperor's words prove the equal position of the Magyars and the Khazars, instead of the Magyars' subjugation to the Khagan. Although the emperor said that the Magyars' cohabitation with the Khazars lasted only for three years, modern historians tend to propose a longer period (20, 30, 100, 150, 200 or even 300 years).

According to a memorial stone erected in or before 831, a Bulgarian military commander named Okorsis drowned in the Dnieper during a military campaign. Florin Curta says this inscription may be the "'first clue' to the upheaval on the steppes created by the migration of the Magyars into the lands between the Dnieper and the Danube". The earliest certainly identifiable events of the Magyars' history occurred in the 830s. The Bulgarians hired them to fight against their Byzantine prisoners, who rebelled and tried to return to Macedonia in the late 830s, but the Byzantines routed them on the banks on the Lower Danube. According to the Annals of St. Bertin, Rus' envoys who visited Constantinople in 839 could only return to their homeland through the Carolingian Empire because "the route by which they had reached Constantinople had taken them through primitive tribes that were very fierce and savage"; Curta and Kristó identify those tribes with the Magyars. Ibn Rusta wrote that the Khazars "used to be protected from attack by the Magyars and other neighboring peoples" by a ditch. According to a scholarly theory, Ibn Rusta's report shows that the Khazar fort at Sarkel, which was built in the 830s, was one of the forts protecting the Khazars against the Magyars.

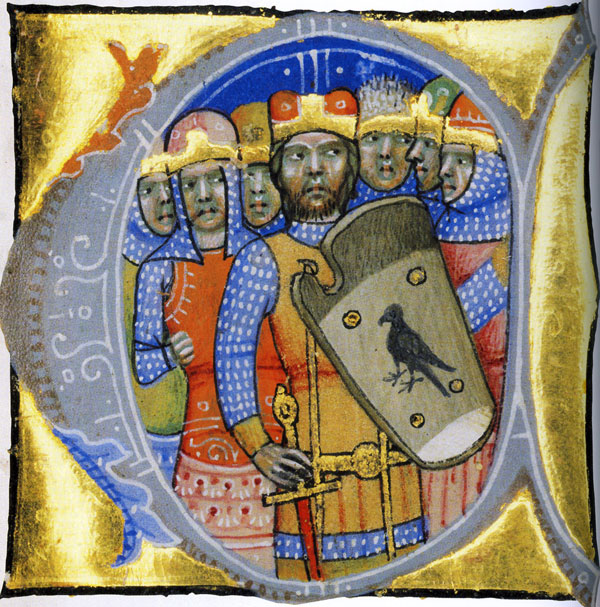
The "seven captains" of the Magyars depicted in the Illuminated Chronicle

According to Porphyrogenitus, In Levedia, the Magyars "were seven clans, but they had never had over them a prince either native or foreign, but there were among them 'voivodes'", or chiefs. Although the exact meaning of the term the emperor used (genea) cannot be exactly determined, scholars have traditionally considered the Magyar "clans" or "tribes" as ethnic and territorial units. In the Hungarian chronicles, references to "seven leading persons" or "seven captains" denote the existence of seven Magyar tribes.

Porphyrogenitus said the tribes did not "obey their own particular [voivodes], but [had] a joint agreement to fight together with all earnestness and zeal ... wheresoever war breaks out", suggesting the tribal chiefs were military rather than political leaders. According to Kristó, the emperor's report also shows the tribal confederation was not a "solid political formation with strong cohesion" in the early 9th century. The Gesta Hungarorum referred to the seven Magyar chiefs as "Hetumoger", or "Seven Magyars". Similar ethnonyms – including Toquz Oghuz ("Nine Oghuzes") and Onogur ("Ten Ogurs") – suggest the Gesta preserved the name of the confederation of the Magyar tribes. According to Porphyrogenitus, Levedia was named after Levedi, one of the Magyar voivodes. During Levedi's life, the Kangars, a distinct group within the Pechenegs' tribal confederation whom the Khazars had expelled from their homeland, invaded Levedia and forced the Magyars to cede the territory. A Magyar group fled across the Caucasus Mountains as far as Persia. However, the masses departed for the West and settled in a region called Etelköz. Most historians agree the Magyars' forced exodus from Levedia occurred around 850.

[T]he Pechenegs who were previously called "Kangar" (for this "Kangar" was a name signifiying nobility and valour among them), these, then, stirred up war against the [Khazars] and, being defeated, were forced to quit their own land and to settle in that of the [Magyars]. And when battle was joined between the [Magyars] and the Pechenegs who were at that time called "Kangar", the army of the [Magyars] was defeated and split into two parts. One part went eastwards and settled in the region of Persia, and they to this day are called by the ancient denomination of the [Magyars] "Sabartoi asphaloi"; but the other part, together with their voivode and chief [Levedi], settled in the western regions, in places called [Etelköz] ... .

— Constantine Porphyrogenitus: De Administrando Imperio

=== Etelköz (c. 850 – c. 895) ===
Constantine Porphyrogenitus identified the Etelköz (actually Ἀτελκούζου from Ἐτὲλ and Κουζοῦ) with the lands where the rivers "Barouch", "Koubou", "Troullos", "Broutos", and "Seretos" run. The identification of the last three is without debate (Troullos - Dniester, Broutos - Prut, Seretos - Siret), but Spinei disputes the traditional identification of the Barouch with the Dnieper and the Koubou with the Southern Bug. Al-Jayyani of Al-Andalus (989–1079), writing in the Arabic vowelless abjad, stated that in the 870s the Magyars' territory was located between two rivers named "tl" and "dwb". According to modern scholars, tl may refer to the Volga, the Don, or the Dnieper; dwb is identified as the Danube. According to the Gesta Hungarorum (ca. 1200-1230), the Magyars lived in "Scythia" or "Dentumoger"; the latter name, which refers to the Don River, suggests the Magyars inhabited the eastern regions of the Pontic steppes, according to Spinei. János Harmatta infers that Dentu (reconstructed as Dentü, Hungarian pronunciation: [dɛnty]) was the Proto-Hungarian name of the river.

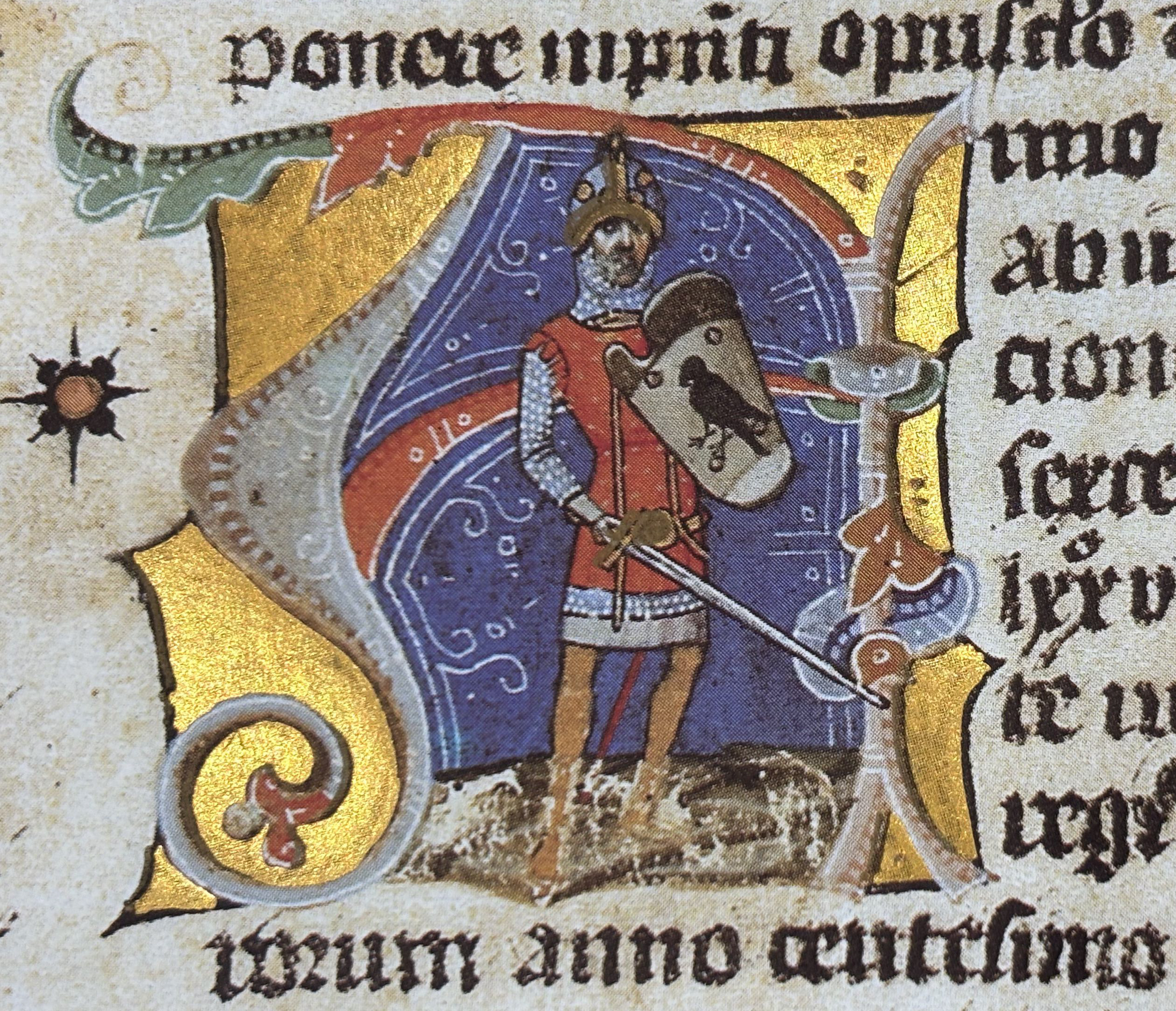
Álmos depicted in the Illuminated Chronicle: he was the first head of the federation of the Magyar tribes, according to the Hungarian chronicles

The Khazar Khagan sent his envoys to the Magyars shortly after they fled from Levedia and settled in Etelköz, according to Porphyrogenitus. The Khagan invited Levedi to a meeting, proposing to appoint him the supreme head of the confederation of the Magyar tribes in exchange for Levedi's acceptance of his suzerainty. Instead of accepting the offer, Levedi suggested the new rank should be offered to another voivode, Álmos, or the latter's son, Árpád. The Khagan accepted Levedi's proposal and upon his demand the Magyar chiefs proclaimed Árpád their head. According to Kristó and Spinei, Porphyrogenitus' report preserved the memory of the creation of a central office within the federation of the Magyar tribes. Róna-Tas says the story relates only a "change of dynasty"; the fall of Levedi's family and the emergence of the Árpád dynasty. In contrast with Porphyrogenitus's story, the Gesta Hungarorum says it was not Árpád, but his father who was elected the first supreme prince of the Magyars.

According to Muslim scholars, the Magyars had two supreme leaders, the kende and the gyula, the latter of whom was their ruler in the 870s. Their report implies the Khagan granted a Khazar title to the head of the federation of the Magyar tribes; Ibn Fadlan recorded that the third Khazar dignitary was styled kündür in the 920s. The Muslim scholar's report also implies the Magyars adopted the Khazar system of "dual kingship", whereby supreme power was divided between a sacred ruler (the kende) and a military leader (the gyula).

Between the country of the [Pechenegs] and the country of the Iskil, which belongs to the [Volga Bulgars], lies the first of the Magyar frontiers. ... Their chief rides at the head of 20,000 horsemen. He is named kundah, but the one who actually rules them is called jilah. All the Magyars implicitly obey this ruler in wars of offence and defence. ... Their territory is vast, extending to the Black Sea, into which two rivers flow, one larger than the Oxus. Their campsites are located between these two rivers.

— Ibn Rusta: On the Magyars

Porphyrogenitus wrote that the Kabars – a group of Khazars who rebelled against the Khagan – joined the Magyars in Etelköz at an unspecified time, suggesting that the Magyars had got rid of the Khagan's suzerainty. The Kabars were organized into three tribes, but a single chieftain commanded them. Porphyrogenitus also wrote that the Kabars "were promoted to be first" tribe, because they showed themselves "the strongest and most valorous" of the tribes. Accordingly, the Kabars formed the Magyars' vanguard, because nomadic peoples always placed the associated tribes in the most vulnerable position.

Ibn Rusta wrote that the Magyars subjected the neighboring Slavic peoples, imposing "a heavy tribute on them" and treating them as prisoners. The Magyars also "made piratical raids on the Slavs" and sold those captured during these raids to the Byzantines in Kerch on the Crimean peninsula. A band of Magyar warriors attacked the future Saint Cyril the Philosopher "howling like wolves and wishing to kill him" in the steppes near the Crimea, according to the saint's legend. However, Cyril convinced them to "release him and his entire retinue in peace". The inhabitants of the regions along the left bank of the Dniester – whom the Russian Primary Chronicle identified as Tivertsi – fortified their settlements in the second half of the 9th century, which seems to be connected to the Magyars' presence.

A plundering raid in East Francia in 862 was the Magyars' first recorded military expedition in Central Europe. This raid may have been initiated by Rastislav of Moravia, who was at war with Louis the German, according to Róna-Tas and Spinei. The longer version of the Annals of Salzburg said the Magyars returned to East Francia and ransacked the region of Vienna in 881. The same source separately mentioned the Cowari, or Kabars, plundering the region of Kulmberg or Kollmitz in the same year, showing that the Kabars formed a distinct group. In the early 880s, a "king" of the Magyars had an amicable meeting with Methodius, Archbishop of Moravia, who was returning from Constantinople to Moravia, according to Methodius' legend.

When the King of Hungary came to the lands of the Danube, Methodius wished to see him. And though some were assuming and saying: "He will not escape torment," Methodius went to [the king]. And as befits a sovereign, [the king] received [Methodius] with honor, solemnity, and joy. Having conversed with [Methodius] as befits such men to converse, [the king] dismissed [Methodius] with an embrace and many gifts. Kissing him, [the king] said: "O venerable Father, remember me always in your holy prayers."

— The Life of Methodius

=== The Hungarian Conquest (c. 895 – 907) ===
The Hungarian conquest of the Carpathian Basin

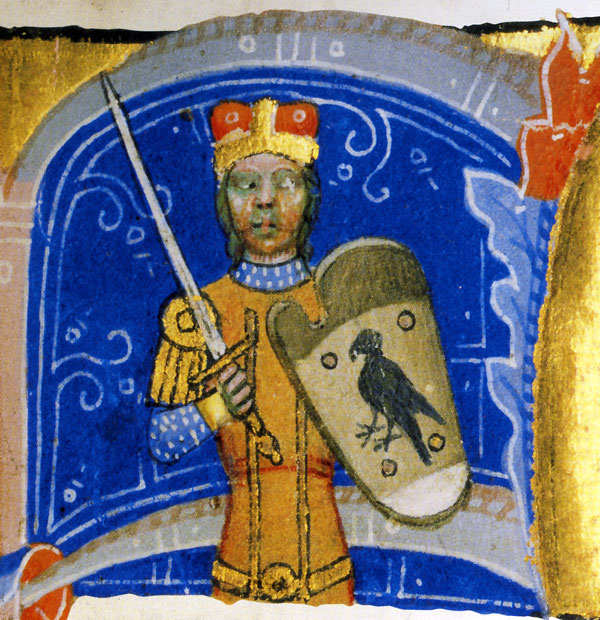
Álmos's son, Árpád, depicted in the Illuminated Chronicle: he was the first head of the federation of the Magyar tribes, according to the Byzantine Emperor Constantine VII Porphyrogenitus

The Magyars returned to Central Europe in July 892, when they invaded Moravia in alliance with Arnulf, king of East Francia. Two years later, they stormed into the March of Pannonia. According to the Annals of Fulda, they "killed men and old women outright, and carried out the young women along with them like cattle to satisfy their lusts". Although this source does not refer to an alliance between the Magyars and Svatopluk I of Moravia, most historians agree the Moravian ruler persuaded them to invade East Francia. During their raids in the Carpathian Basin, the Magyars had several opportunities to collect information on their future homeland.

The Samanid emir, Isma'il ibn Ahmad, launched an expedition against the Oghuz Turks in 893, forcing them to invade the Pechenegs' lands between the Volga and Ural rivers. After being expelled from their homeland, the Pechenegs departed for the west in search of new pastures. The Magyars had in the meantime invaded Bulgaria in alliance with the Byzantine Emperor Leo the Wise. Simeon I of Bulgaria sent envoys to the Pechenegs and persuaded them to storm into Etelköz. The unexpected invasion destroyed the unguarded dwelling places of the Magyars, forcing them to leave the Pontic steppes and seek refuge over the Carpathian Mountains. The Magyars occupied their new homeland in several phases, initially settling the lands east of the Danube and only invading the March of Pannonia after Arnulf of East Francia died in 899. They destroyed Moravia before 906 and consolidated their control of the Carpathian Basin through their victory over a Bavarian army in the Battle of Brezalauspurc in 907.

Byzantine and Muslim authors of the 9th and 10th centuries regarded Hungarians as Turks. Byzantine authors called Hungarians Tourkoi and their country Tourkia.

== Sources ==
=== Archaeology ===
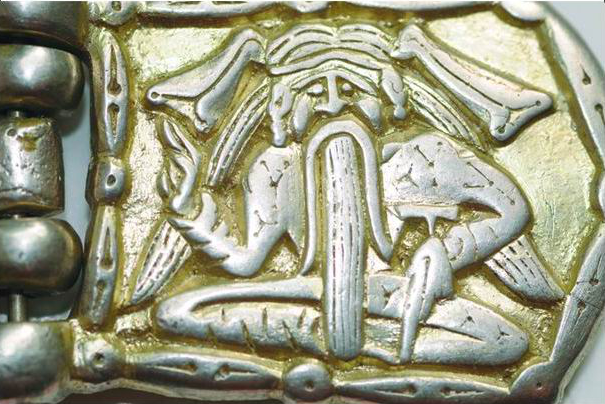
A fastener from the 9th century, unearthed in Kirovohrad Oblast, Ukraine; the finding belongs to the "Subotcy horizon", attributed to the pre-conquest Hungarians

Since the 1830s, archaeology has played an important role in the study of the Magyar prehistory. Archaeologists have applied two methods; the so-called "linear method" attempts to determine the route of the migrating Magyars from their original homeland to the Carpathian Basin, while the "retrospective method" tries to discover the antecedents of 10th-century assemblages from the Carpathian Basin in the Eurasian steppes. However, only twelve cemeteries in the steppes have yielded finds that show similarities to assemblages unearthed in the Carpathian Basin. The dating of those cemeteries is also controversial.

Both the scarcity of published archaeological material and the misdating of some sites may have contributed to the low number of archaeological sites that can be attributed to the Hungarians in the steppes, according to archaeologist László Kovács. Kovács also says that the Hungarians' migration from the steppes and their settlement in the Carpathian Basin may have caused the development of a new material culture, rendering the identification of pre-conquest Hungarians difficult. Archaeological research has demonstrated that the material culture of the Avars and other steppe peoples who settled in the Carpathian Basin before the Hungarians experienced a similarly significant change after they left the steppes and settled in their new homeland.

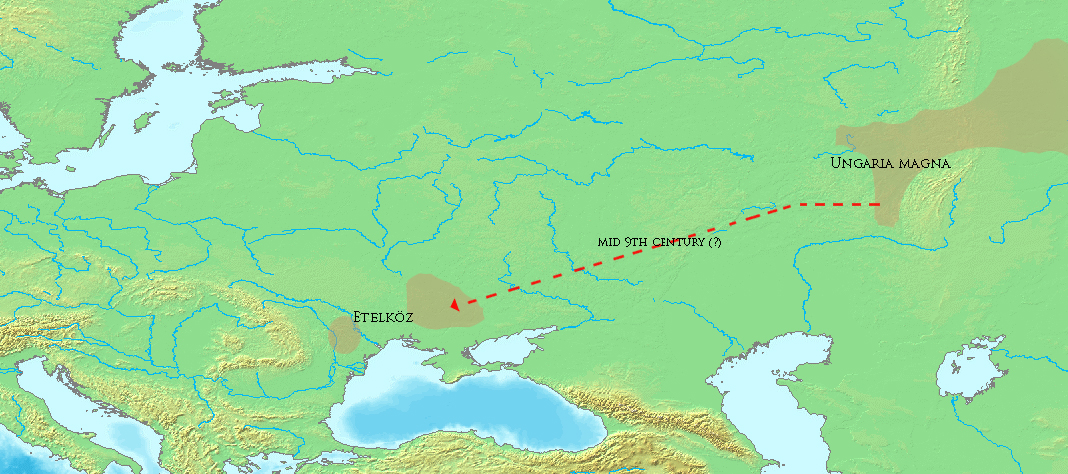
Migration of Hungarians

Buckles, belt mounts, and other objects of the so-called "Subotcy horizon", which were unearthed at Caterinovca, Slobozia, and other sites along the middle course of the Dniester show similarities with archaeological finds from the 10th-century Carpathian Basin. These objects were carbon dated to the late 9th century. The same archaeological sites also yielded vessels similar to the pottery of the neighboring Slavic territories.

=== Linguistics ===
The study of the Hungarian language is one of the main sources of the research on the ethnogenesis of the Hungarian people because a language shows the circumstances of its own development and its contacts with other idioms. According to a scholarly theory, the oldest layers of Hungarian vocabulary show features of the territory in which the language emerged. The study of loan words from other languages is instrumental in determining direct contacts between the ancient speakers of the Hungarian language and other peoples. Loan words also reflect changes in the way of life of the Magyars.

=== Written sources ===
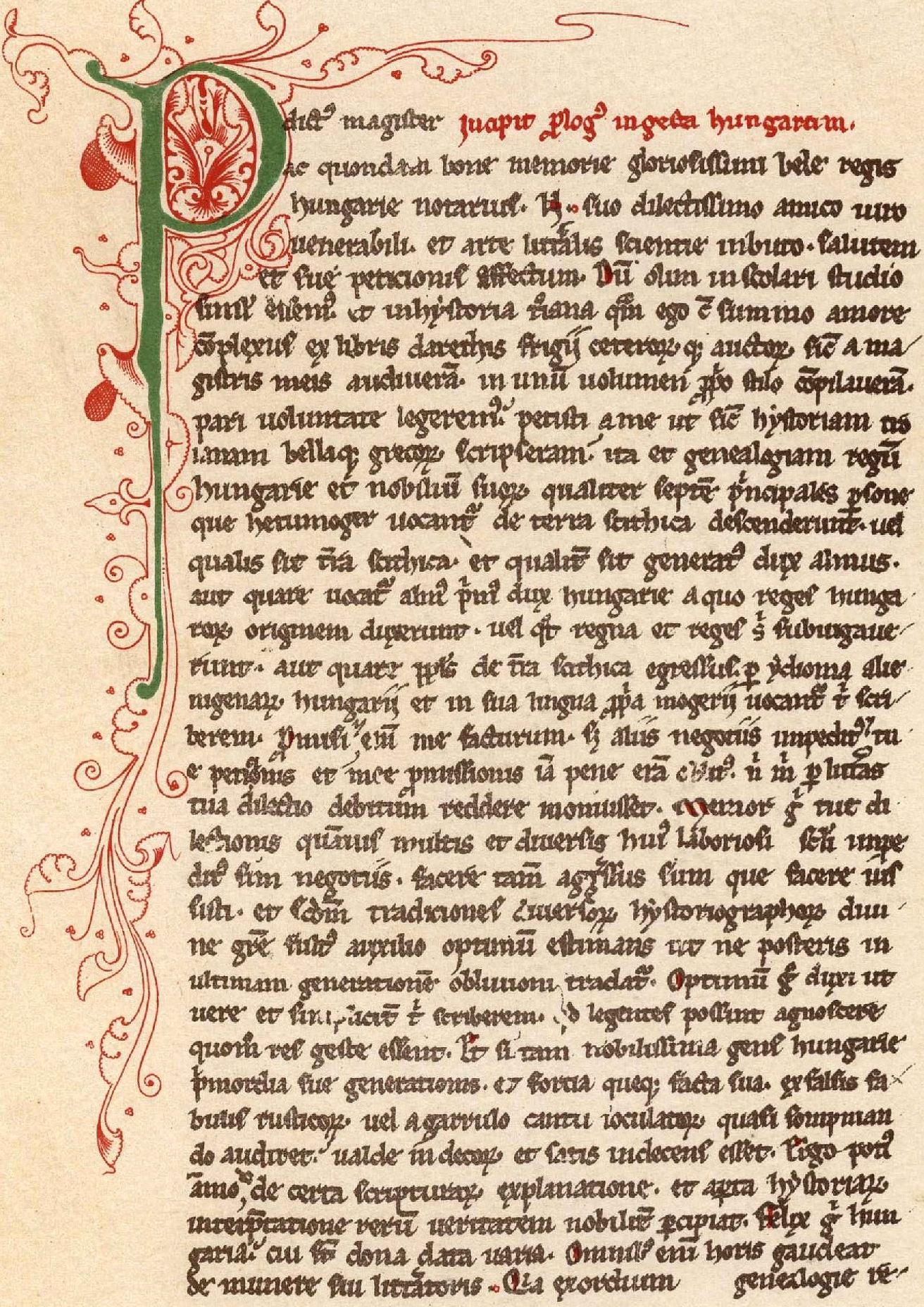
The first page of the sole manuscript preserving the text of the Gesta Hungarorum, the earliest extant Hungarian chronicle

Written sources on the prehistoric Hungarians may begin with Herodotus, who wrote of the Iyrcae, a people of equestrian hunters who lived next to the Thyssagetae. Based on the location of the homeland of the Iyrcae and their ethnonym, Gyula Moravcsik, János Harmatta, and other scholars identify them as Hungarians; their view has not been universally accepted. The 6th-century Byzantine historian John Malalas referred to a Hunnic tribal leader called Muageris, who ruled around 527 AD. Moravcsik, Dezső Pais, and other historians connect Muageris's name to the Hungarians' endonym (Magyar); they say Malalas's report proves the presence of Magyar tribes in the region of the Sea of Azov in the early 6th century AD. This identification is accepted by most scholars.

The Continuation of the Chronicle by George the Monk, which was written in the middle of the 10th century, recorded the first historical event – an alliance between the Magyars and the Bulgarians in the late 830s – that can without doubt be connected to the Magyars. The Byzantine Emperor Leo the Wise's Tactics, a book written around 904, contained a detailed description of their military strategies and way of life. Emperor Constantine Porphyrogenitus's De administrando imperio ("On Governing the Empire"), which was completed between 948 and 952, preserves most information on the Magyars' early history. Abu Abdallah al-Jayhani, the minister of Nasr II, ruler of the Samanid Empire, collected the reports of merchants who had traveled in the western regions of the Eurasian steppes in the 870s and 880s. Although Al-Jayhani's work was lost, later Muslim scholars Ibn Rusta, Gardizi, Abu Tahir Marwazi, and Al-Bakri used his book, preserving important facts about the late 9th-century Magyars. However, their works also contain interpolations from later periods. Among the sources written in Western Europe, the longer version of the Annals of Salzburg, Regino of Prüm's Chronicon, the Annals of Fulda, and Liutprand of Cremona's Antapodosis ("Retribution"), provide contemporaneous or near-contemporaneous information of the 9th-century Magyars. There are also references to the Magyars dwelling in the Pontic steppes in the legends of Cyril, Methodius and other early Slavic saints. According to historian András Róna-Tas, information preserved in the Russian Primary Chronicle, which was completed in the 1110s, has to be "treated with extreme caution".

The first Hungarian chronicles were written in the late 11th or early 12th centuries but their texts were preserved in manuscripts compiled in the 13th to 15th centuries. Most extant chronicles show that the earliest works contained no information on the history of the Hungarians before their conversion to Christianity in the 11th century. The only exception is the Gesta Hungarorum, which is the earliest extant Hungarian chronicle, whose principal subject is the Magyars' pagan past. However, the reliability of this work, which was written by a former royal notary now known as Anonymus, is suspect. In his monograph of medieval Hungarian historians, Carlile Aylmer Macartney describes it as "the most famous, the most obscure, the most exasperating and most misleading of all the early Hungarian texts".

== Historiography ==
=== Medieval theories ===
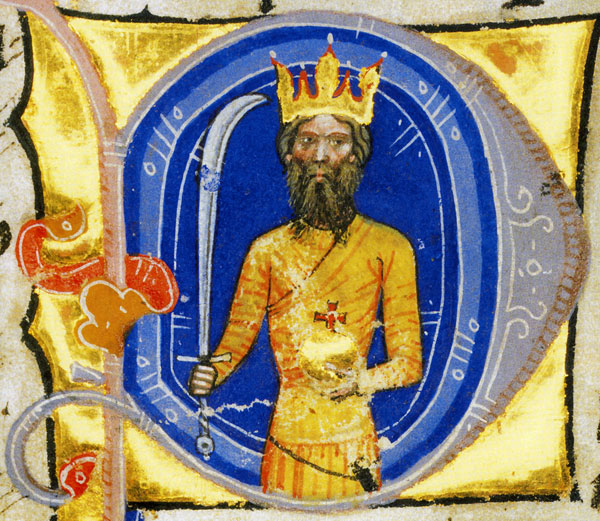
King Attila as the first Hungarian king (Chronicon Pictum, 1358)

According to the Annals of St. Bertin, the Magyars who invaded East Francia in 862 were enemies "hitherto unknown" to the local population. Likewise, Regino of Prüm wrote that the Magyars had been "unheard of in the previous centuries because they were not named". in the sources. Both remarks evince that late 9th-century authors had no knowledge of the Magyars' origins. However, the Magyar raids reminded the Western European and Byzantine scholars of earlier historians' descriptions of the Scythians or Huns, which gave rise to their identification with those peoples. For instance, Leo the Wise listed the Hungarians among the "Scythian nations". The similarity between the Latin ethnonyms Huni and Hungari strengthened the identification of the two peoples, which became commonplace in Western Europe in the 11th century. The Chronicon Eberspergense was the first source that clearly stated that the Huns and the Hungarians were the same people.

The earliest Hungarian chronicles adopted the idea that the Huns and Hungarians were closely related. Anonymus did not mention the Huns, but he referred to Attila the Hun as a ruler "from whose line Prince Álmos", the supreme head of the Magyar tribes, descended. However, Simon of Kéza explicitly identified the Huns and the Hungarians in the 1280. He started his chronicle with a book of the history of the Huns, thus presenting the Hungarian conquest of the Carpathian Basin as the reoccupation of a land inherited from their ancestors. Thereafter the identification of the two peoples was the basic theory of the origins of the Hungarians for centuries.

In the 401st year of Our Lord's birth, in the 28th year since the arrival of the Hungarians in Pannonia, according to the custom of the Romans, the Huns, namely the Hungarians exalted Attila as king above themselves, the son of Bendegúz, who was before among the captains. And he made his brother Buda a prince and a judge from the River Tisza to the River Don. Calling himself the King of the Hungarians, the Fear of the World, the Scourge of God: Attila, King of the Huns, Medes, Goths and Danes…

— Mark of Kalt: Chronicon Pictum

==== Legend of the Wondrous Hind ====
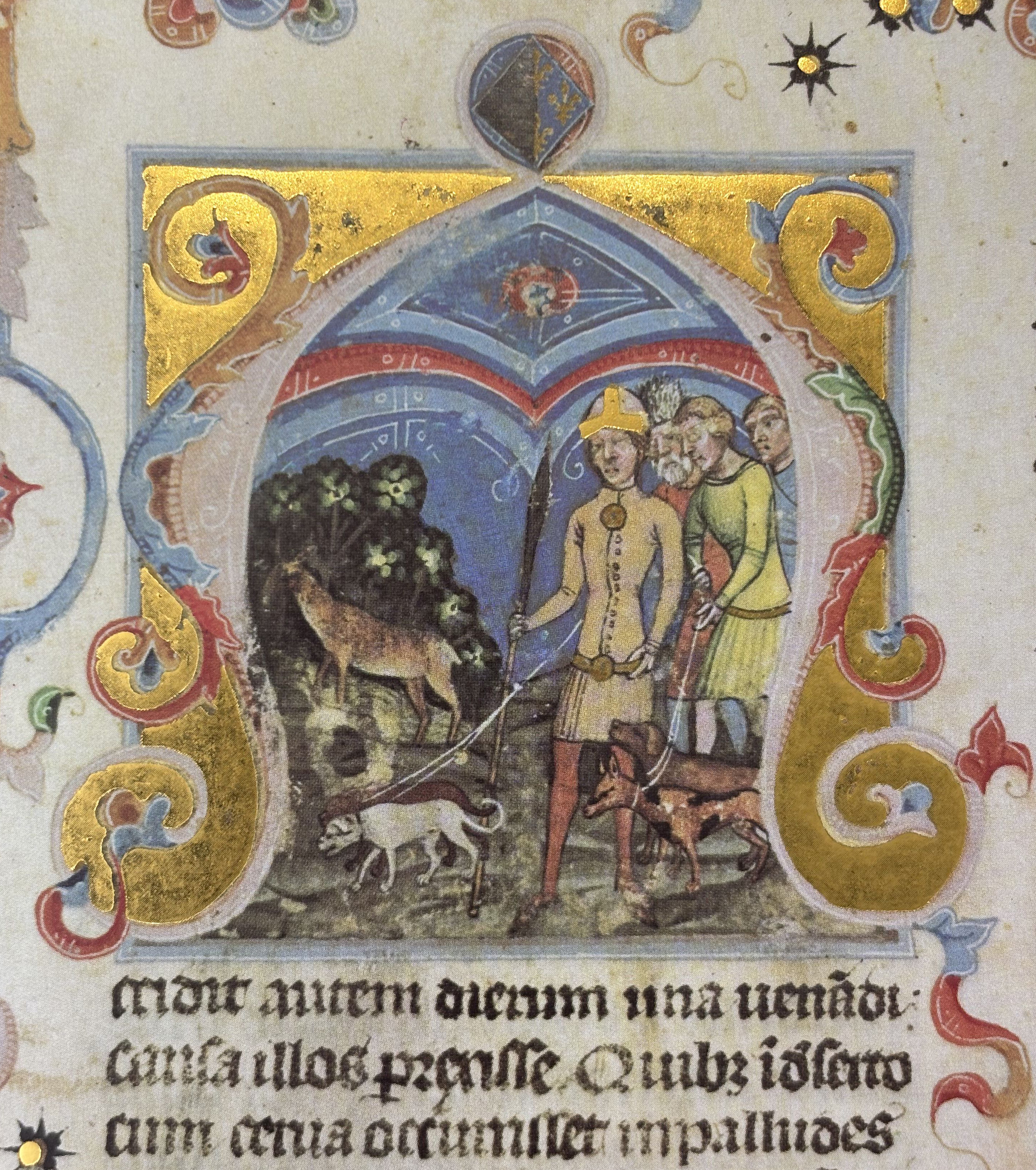
The "legend of the wondrous hind" depicted in the Illuminated Chronicle

Most historians agree that the legend of the wondrous hind preserved the Hungarians' own myth of their origins. The late 13th-century chronicler Simon of Kéza was the first to record it. The legend says two brothers, Hunor and Magor, were the forefathers of the Huns and Hungarians. They were the sons of Ménrót and his wife, Eneth. While chasing a hind, they reached as far as the marches of the Sea of Azov, where they abducted the wives of Belar's sons and two daughters of Dula, the prince of the Alans. According to historian Gyula Kristó, Eneth's name derived from the Hungarian word for hind (ünő), showing that the Magyars regarded this animal as their totemistic ancestor. Kristó also says the four personal names mentioned in the legend personify four peoples: the Hungarians (Magor), the Onogurs (Hunor), the Bulgars (Belar) and the Dula – kindred of the Alans or Bulgars (Dulo). The hunt for a beast, ending with the arrival in a new homeland, was a popular legend among the peoples of the Eurasian steppes, including the Huns and the Mansi. The myth that a people were descended from two brothers was also widespread. Consequently, it is possible that Simon of Kéza did not record a genuine Hungarian legend, but borrowed it from foreign sources.

After the confusion of tongues the giant [Ménrót] entered the land of Havilah, which is now called Persia, and there he begot two sons, Hunor and Mogor, by his wife Eneth. It was from them that the Huns, or Hungarians, took their origins. ... [A]s Hunor and Mogor were Ménrót's first born, they journeyed separately from their father in tents. Now it happened one day when they had gone out hunting in the Meotis marshes that they encountered a hind in the wilderness. As they went in pursuit of it, it fled before them. Then it disappeared from their sight altogether, and they could not find it no matter how long they searched. But as they were wandering through these marshes, they saw that the land was well suited for grazing cattle. They then returned to their father, and after obtaining his permission they took all their possessions and went to live in the Meotis marshes. ... So they entered the Meotis marshes and remained there for five years without leaving. Then in the sixth year they went out, and when by chance they discovered that the wives and children of the sons of Belar were camped in tents in a lonely place without their menfolk, they carried them off with all their belongings as fast as they could into the Meotis marshes. Two daughters of Dula, prince of the Alans, happened to be among the children who were seized. Hunor took one of them in marriage and Mogor the other, and to these women all the Huns owe their origin.

— Simon of Kéza: Gesta Hunnorum et Hungarorum

=== Modern scholarship ===
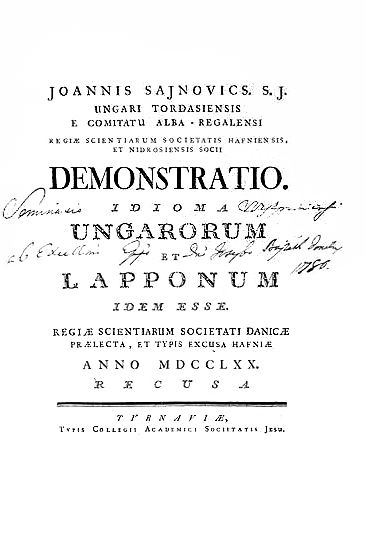
The title page of János Sajnovics's Demonstratio, the first systematic study of the comparison of the Hungarian and Saami languages

Scholarly attempts in the early 18th century to prove a relationship between the Finns and the Huns led to the realization of the similarities between the Finnish and Hungarian languages. János Sajnovics's Demonstratio, the first systematic comparative study of Hungarian and the Saami languages, was published in 1770. Three decades later, Sámuel Gyarmathi demonstrated similarities between a larger group of languages that are now known as Uralic languages. However, the majority of Hungarian scholars only gradually adopted Sajnovics's and Gyarmathi's views. In the 1830s, Pál Hunfalvy still wrote that Hungarian had an intermediate position between the Finnish and Turkic languages, but later accepted that Hungarian is closely related to the Mansi and Khanty languages. Hereafter linguistics played a pre-eminent role in the research of the Magyars' prehistory because it was always the dominant linguistic theory that determined the interpretation of historical and archaeological evidence. Consequently, as historian Nóra Berend writes, Hungarian prehistory is "a tenuous construct based on linguistics, folklore analogies, archaeology, and later written evidence", because there are no certain records of the Magyars before the 9th century and the identification of archaeological cultures with peoples is highly debatable. Historian László Kontler identifies "the history of Hungarian origins" as "the history of a community whose genetic composition and cultural character has been changing, but which has assuredly spoken Hungarian or its predecessor language".

According to mainstream scholarly consensus, the Hungarians are not the autochthonous population of the Carpathian Basin. Their ancestors arrived there through a series of westward migrations across the Eurasian steppes around 894, centuries after their departure from their original homeland located somewhere in the East. Many details of the Magyars' prehistory – the location of their original homeland, the ancient Magyars' connections with the Turkic peoples and the Khazar Khaganate, their lifestyle and political organization, and the background of their conquest of the Carpathian Basin – are still subject to scholarly debates. With regard to the connections between the Magyars and the Turkic tribes, archaeologist Gyula László mooted an alternative theory in the 1960s. According to his theory of the "double conquest", a large group of people who spoke a Finno-Ugrian language arrived in the Carpathian Basin in 670, and a Turkic-speaking people conquered the same territory in the late 9th century. László's theory has never been widely accepted.

== Way of life ==
=== Economy ===
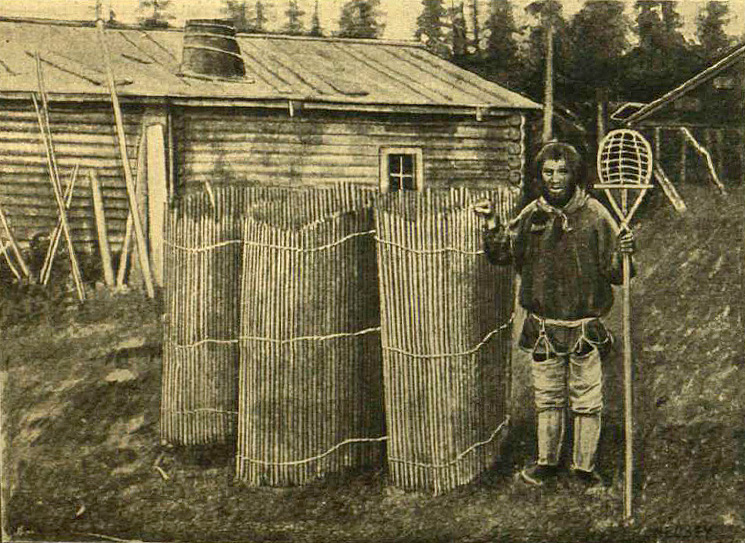
Traditional Khanty fishing equipment

Most Neolithic settlements were situated on the banks of rivers and lakes in the proposed original homeland of the Uralic peoples, but no houses have been excavated there. The local inhabitants primarily used tools made of stone – especially jasper from the southern Urals – , bone and wood, but baked clay vessels decorated with broken or wavy lines were also found. Their economy was based on fishing, hunting, and gathering. The basic Hungarian words connected to these activities – háló (net), íj (bow), nyíl (arrow), ideg (bowstring), and mony (egg) – are inherited from the Proto-Uralic period. The Hungarian words for house (ház), dwelling (lak), door (ajtó), and bed (ágy) are of Proto-Finno-Ugric origin. Houses built in the presumed Finno-Ugric homeland in the wider region of the Urals in the 3rd millennium BC show regional differences; in the valley of the Sosva River, square pit-houses were dug deep into the ground; along the Kama River, rectangular semi-pit houses were built. The local people were hunter-gatherers. They used egg-shaped, baked clay vessels that were decorated with rhombuses, triangles, and other geometrical forms. They buried their dead in shallow graves and showered the bodies with red ochre. They also placed objects including tools, jewels made of pierced boar tusks, and small pendants in the form of animal heads into the graves. Copper objects found in the graves, which were manufactured in the Caucasus Mountains, indicate that the inhabitants of the lands on both sides of the Ural Mountains had trading contacts with faraway territories around 2000 BC. Words from the Proto-Ugric period – ló ("horse"), nyereg ("saddle"), fék ("bridle"), and szekér ("wagon") – show that those who spoke this language rode horses. Animal husbandry spread on both sides of the Urals from around 1500 BC. The bones of domestic animals – cattle, goats, sheep, pigs, and horses – comprised 90% of all animal bones excavated in many settlements. Loan words from Proto-Iranian suggest the Ugric-speaking populations adopted animal husbandry from neighboring peoples. For instance, the Hungarian words for cow (tehén) and milk (tej) are of Proto-Iranian origin. Archaeological finds – including seeds of millet, wheat, and barley, and tools including sickles, hoes, and spade handles – prove the local population also cultivated arable lands.

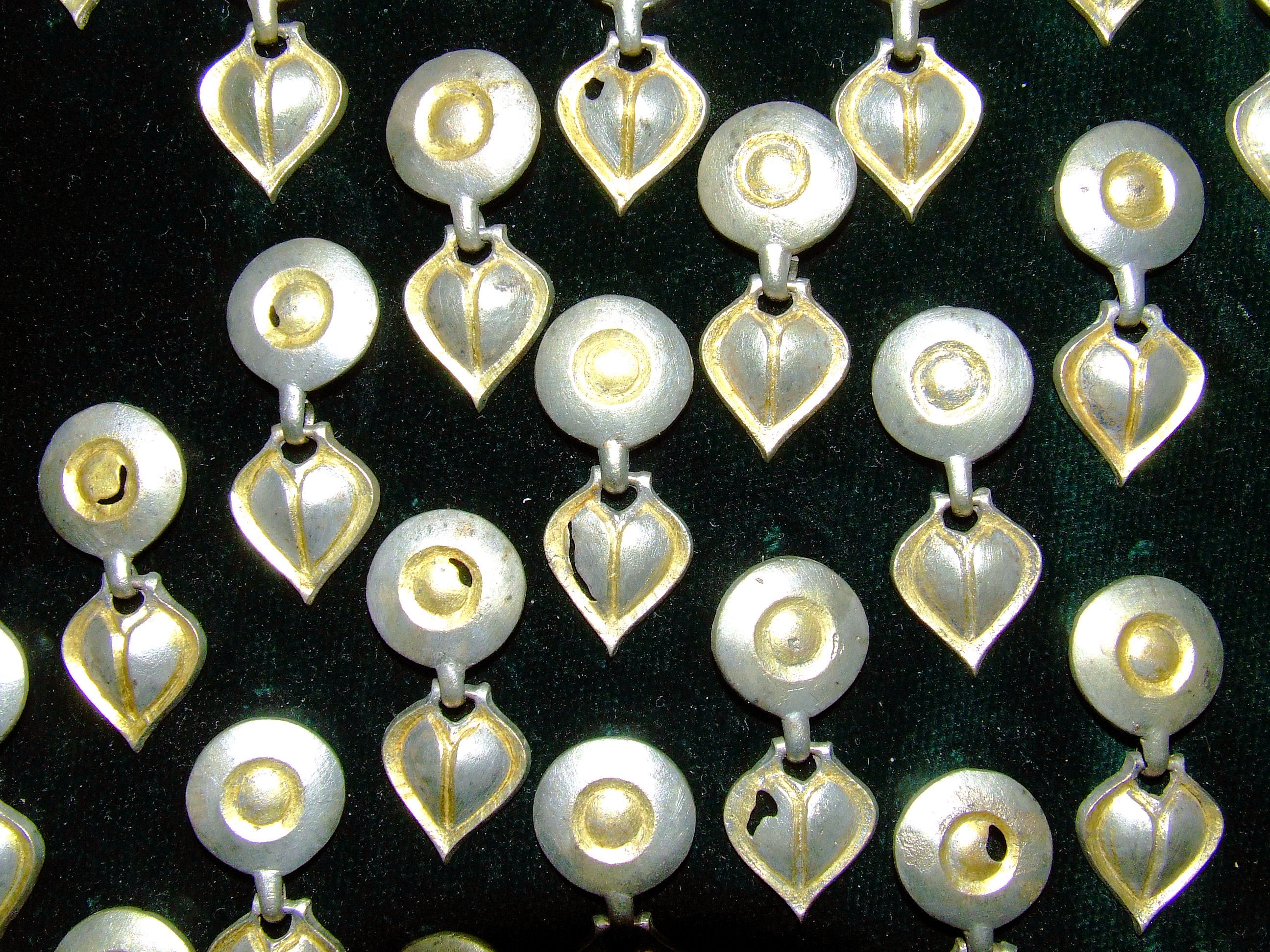
10th-century artifacts from a grave of a wealthy woman, unearthed at Szeged-Bojárhalom

The Magyars' ancestors gave up their settled way of life because of the northward expansion of the steppes during the last centuries of the 2nd millennium BC. Ethnographic studies of modern nomadic populations suggest cyclic migrations – a year-by-year movement between their winter and summer camps – featured in their way of life, but they also cultivated arable lands around their winter camps. Most historians agree the Magyars had a mixed nomadic or semi-nomadic economy, characterized by both the raising of cattle and the cultivation of arable lands. Turkic loanwords in the Hungarian language show the Magyars adopted many practices of animal husbandry and agriculture from Turkic peoples between the 5th and 9th centuries. For instance, the Hungarian words for hen (tyúk), pig (disznó), castrated hog (ártány), bull (bika), ox (ökör), calf (borjú), steer (tinó), female cow (ünő), goat (kecske), camel (teve), ram (kos), buttermilk (író), shepherd's cloak (köpönyeg), badger (borz), fruit (gyümölcs), apple (alma), pear (körte), grape (szőlő), dogwood (som), sloe (kökény), wheat (búza), barley (árpa), pea (borsó), hemp (kender), pepper (borz), nettle (csalán), garden (kert), plough (eke), ax (balta), scutcher (tiló), oakum (csepű), weed (gyom), refuse of grain (ocsú), fallow land (tarló), and sickle (sarló) are of Turkic origin. Most loanwords were borrowed from Bulgar or other Chuvash-type Turkic language, but the place and the time of the borrowings are uncertain. The Magyars' connections with the people of the Saltovo-Mayaki culture may have contributed to the development of their agriculture, according to Spinei.

According to Ibn Rusta, the late 9th-century Magyars "dwell in tents and move from place to place in search of pasturage", but during the winters they settled along the nearest river, where they lived by fishing. He also said their "land is well watered and harvests abundant", showing they had arable lands, although it is unclear whether those lands were cultivated by the Magyars themselves or by their prisoners. Taxes collected from the neighboring peoples, a slave trade, and plundering raids made the Magyars a wealthy people. Gardezi wrote that they were "a handsome people and of good appearance and their clothes are of silk brocade and their weapons are of silver and are encrusted with pearls", proving their growing wealth. However, 9th-century Byzantine and Muslim coins have rarely been found in the Pontic steppes.

Archaeological finds from the Carpathian Basin provide evidence of the crafts practiced by the Magyars. 10th-century warriors' graves yielding sabres, arrow-heads, spear-heads, stirrups, and snaffle bits made of iron show that blacksmiths had a pre-eminent role in the militarized Magyar society. Engraved or gilded sabres and sabretache plates – often decorated with precious stones – and golden or silver pectoral disks evidence the high levels of skills of Magyar gold- and silversmiths. Cemeteries in the Carpathian Basin also yielded scraps of canvas made of flax or hemp. The positioning of metal buttons in the graves shows the Magyars wore clothes that either opened down the front or were fastened at the neck. Ear-rings were the only accessories worn above the belt by Magyar warriors; jewelry on their upper bodies would have hindered them from firing arrows. In contrast, Magyar women wore head jewelry decorated with leaf-like pendants, ear-rings, decorated pectoral disks, and rings with gemstones.

A man seeking a bride was expected to pay a bride price to her father before the marriage took place, according to Gardizi's description of the late 9th-century Magyars. The Hungarian word for bridegroom – vőlegény from vevő legény ("purchasing lad") – and the expression eladó lány (verbatim, "bride for sale") confirm the reliability of the Muslim author's report. A decree of Stephen I of Hungary prohibiting the abduction of a girl without her parents' consent implies that pretended abduction of the bride by her future husband was an integral part of ancient Magyar matrimonial ceremonies.

=== Military ===
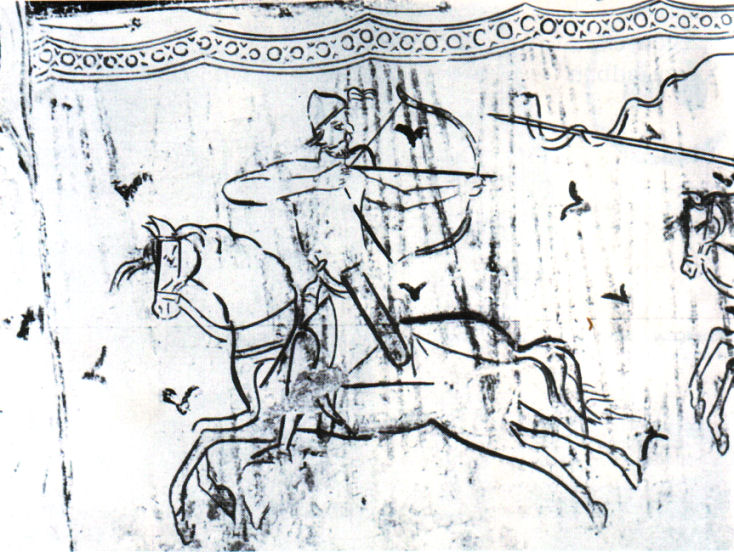
Fresco about a Hungarian warrior (Italy)

The Magyars' military tactics were similar to those of the Huns, Avars, Pechenegs, Mongols, and other nomadic peoples. According to Emperor Leo the Wise, the main components of Magyar warfare were long-distance arrow-fire, surprise attack, and feigned retreat. However, the contemporaneous Regino of Prüm said the Magyars knew "nothing about ... taking besieged cities". Archaeological research confirms Leo the Wise's report of the use of sabres, bows, and arrows. However, in contrast with the emperor's report, spears have rarely been found in Magyar warriors' tombs. Their most important weapons were bone-reinforced reflex bows, with which they could shoot at a specific target within 60–70 metres (200–230 ft).

In battle [the Magyars] do not line up as do the [Byzantines] in three divisions, but in several units of irregular size, linking the divisions close to one another although separated by short distances, so that they give the impression of one battle line. Apart from their battle line, they maintain an additional force that they send out to ambush careless adversaries of theirs or hold in reserve to support a hard-pressed section. ... Frequently they tie the extra horses together to the rear, that is, behind their battle line, as protection for it. They make the depth of the files, that is, the rows, of their battle line irregular because they consider it more important that the line should be thick than deep, and they make their front even and dense. They prefer battles fought at long range, ambushes, encircling their adversaries, simulated withdrawals and wheeling about, and scattered formations.

— Leo the Wise: Tactics

=== Religion ===
Modern scholarly theories of the Hungarians' pagan religious beliefs and practices are primarily based on reports by biased medieval authors and prohibitions enacted during the reigns of Christian kings. Their religion is thought to have included shamanistic and animistic elements, and was likely a form of Tengrism. Both Christian and Muslim sources say the Hungarians worshipped forces of nature. They gave offering to trees, fountains, and stones, and made sacrifices at wells; these are evidenced by the prohibition of such practices during the reign of Ladislaus I of Hungary in the late 11th century. In accordance with the custom of the peoples of the Eurasian steppes, the pagan Hungarians swore oaths on dogs, which were bisected to warn potential oathbrakers of their fate. Simon of Kéza also wrote about the sacrifice of horses. According to the Gesta Hungarorum, the seven Hungarian chiefs confirmed their treaty "in pagan manner with their own blood spilled in a single vessel".

Scholars studying the Hungarians' religion also take into account ethnographic analogies, folklore, linguistic evidence, and archaeological research. Artifacts depicting a bird of prey or a tree of life imply both symbols were important elements of the Hungarian religion. Trepanation – the real or symbolic wounding of the cranium – was widely practiced by 10th-century Hungarians. Gyula László writes that real trepanations – the opening of the skull with a chiesel and the closing of the wound with a sheet of silver – were actually surgical operations similarly to those already practiced by Arab physicians, whereas symbolic trepanations – the marking of the skull with an incised circle – were aimed at the disposal of a protective talisman on the head. According to Róna-Tas, a Hungarian word for cunning, (agyafúrt) – verbatim "with a drilled brain" – may reflect these ancient practices.

The Hungarians buried their dead, laying the deceased on their backs with the arms resting along their bodies or upon their pelvises. A deceased warrior's tomb always contained material connected with his horse. These are most frequently its skin, skull, and the lower legs; these were put into its master's grave, but occasionally only the harness was buried together with the warrior, or the horse's skin was stuffed with hay. The Hungarians rolled the corpses in textiles or mats and placed silver plates on the eyes and the mouth.

Scholarly theories note the similarities between the táltos of Hungarian folklore and Siberian shamans, but the existence of shamans among the ancient Hungarians cannot be proven. Many elements of the Hungarian religious vocabulary, including boszorkány ("witch"), elbűvöl ("to charm"), and the ancient Hungarian word for holy (igy or egy), are of Turkic origin. Many of these loanwords were adopted into their Christian vocabulary: búcsú (indulgence), bűn (sin), gyón (confess), isten (god), and ördög (devil). According to Gyula László, a Hungarian children's verse that refers to a fife, a drum, and a reed violin preserves the memory of a pagan ritual for expelling harmful spirits by raising great noise. The refrain of another children's verse, which mentions three days of the week in reverse order, may have preserved an ancient belief in the existence of an afterlife world where everything is upside-down.

Stork, oh stork, oh little stork,
What has made your leg bleed so?
A Turkish child made the cut,
A Magyar child will cure it
With fife and drum and a reed violin.

— A Hungarian children's song.

== See also ==
- Hungarian mythology
- Hunor and Magor
- List of Hungarian rulers
- Magyar tribes
- Old Hungarian alphabet
- Origin of the Székelys
- Principality of Hungary
- Shamanistic remnants in Hungarian folklore
- Turul

== Sources ==
=== Primary sources ===
- Anonymus, Notary of King Béla: The Deeds of the Hungarians (Edited, Translated and Annotated by Martyn Rady and László Veszprémy) (2010). In: Rady, Martyn; Veszprémy, László; Bak, János M. (2010); Anonymus and Master Roger; CEU Press; ISBN 978-963-9776-95-1.
- Constantine Porphyrogenitus: De Administrando Imperio (Greek text edited by Gyula Moravcsik, English translation by Romillyi J. H. Jenkins) (1967). Dumbarton Oaks Center for Byzantine Studies. ISBN 0-88402-021-5.
- "Ibn Rusta on the Magyars 903–913" (2012). In: Ibn Fadlān: Ibn Fadlān on the Land of Darkness: Arab Travellers in the Far North (Translated with an Introduction by Paul Lunde and Caroline Stone) (2012); Penguin Books; ISBN 978-0-140-45507-6.
- Simon of Kéza: The Deeds of the Hungarians (Edited and translated by László Veszprémy and Frank Schaer with a study by Jenő Szűcs) (1999). CEU Press. ISBN 963-9116-31-9.
- The Annals of Fulda (Ninth-Century Histories, Volume II) (Translated and annotated by Timothy Reuter) (1992). Manchester University Press. ISBN 0-7190-3458-2.
- The Annals of St-Bertin (Ninth-Century Histories, Volume I) (Translated and annotated by Janet L. Nelson) (1991). Manchester University Press. ISBN 978-0-7190-3426-8.
- "The Chronicle of Regino of Prüm" (2009). In: History and Politics in Late Carolingian and Ottonian Europe: The Chronicle of Regino of Prüm and Adalbert of Magdeburg (Translated and annotated by Simon MacLean); Manchester University Press; ISBN 978-0-7190-7135-5.
- The Hungarian Illuminated Chronicle: Chronica de Gestis Hungarorum (Edited by Dezső Dercsényi) (1970). Corvina, Taplinger Publishing. ISBN 0-8008-4015-1.
- The Taktika of Leo VI (Text, translation, and commentary by George T. Dennis) (2010). Dumbarton Oaks. ISBN 978-0-88402-359-3.
- "The Life of Constantine"; "The Life of Methodius" (1983). In: Kantor, Marvin (1983); Medieval Slavic Lives of Saints and Princes; pp. 23–161. University of Michigan; ISBN 0-930042-44-1.

=== Secondary sources ===
- Erdélyi, István (1986). Moharos, Éva (ed.). A magyar honfoglalás és előzményei (in Hungarian). Debrecen: Kossuth Könyvkiadó. ISBN 963-09-3019-6. ISSN 0324-7953.
- Berend, Nora; Urbańczyk, Przemysław; Wiszewski, Przemysław (2013). Central Europe in the High Middle Ages: Bohemia, Hungary and Poland, c. 900-c. 1300. Cambridge University Press. ISBN 978-0-521-78156-5.
- Brook, Kevin Alan (2006). The Jews of Khazaria. Rowman & Littlefield. ISBN 978-0-7425-4982-1.
- Cartledge, Bryan (2011). The Will to Survive: A History of Hungary. C. Hurst & Co. ISBN 978-1-84904-112-6.
- Csorba, Csaba (1997). Árpád népe [Árpád's People] (in Hungarian). Kulturtrade. ISBN 963-9069-20-5.
- Curta, Florin (2006). Southeastern Europe in the Middle Ages, 500–1250. Cambridge University Press. ISBN 978-0-521-89452-4.
- Engel, Pál (2001). The Realm of St Stephen: A History of Medieval Hungary, 895–1526. I.B. Tauris Publishers. ISBN 1-86064-061-3.
- Ertl, Alan W. (2008). Toward an Understanding of Europe: A Political Economic Précis of Continental Integration. Universal-Publishers. ISBN 978-1-59942-983-0.
- Fodor, István (1975). In Search of a New Homeland: The Prehistory of the Hungarian People and the Conquest. Corvina Kiadó. ISBN 963-13-1126-0.
- Gulya, János (1997). "A magyarok önelnevezésének eredete [Origin of the self-designation of the Hungarians]". In Kovács, László; Veszprémy, László (eds.). Honfoglalás és nyelvészet [The Hungarian Conquest and Linguistics]. Balassi Kiadó. pp. 85–97. ISBN 963-506-108-0.
- Harmatta, János (1997). "A magyarok nevei görög nyelvű forrásokban [The Hungarians' ethnonyms in Greek sources]". In Kovács, László; Veszprémy, László (eds.). Honfoglalás és nyelvészet [The Hungarian Conquest and Linguistics]. Balassi Kiadó. pp. 119–140. ISBN 963-506-108-0.
- Klima, László (2004). "The history of research on the ancestral Uralic homeland". In Nanovfszky, György (ed.). The Finno-Ugric World. Teleki László Foundation. pp. 15–24. ISBN 963-7081-01-1.
- Kontler, László (1999). Millennium in Central Europe: A History of Hungary. Atlantisz Publishing House. ISBN 963-9165-37-9.
- Kovács, László (2005). "Remarks on the archaeological remains of the 9th–10th century Hungarians". In Mende, Balázs Gusztáv (ed.). Research on the Prehistory of the Hungarians: Review: Papers Presented at the Meetings of the Institute of Archaeology of the HAS, 2003–2004. Archaeological Institute of the HAS. pp. 351–368. ISBN 963-7391-87-8.
- Kristó, Gyula (1996). Hungarian History in the Ninth Century. Szegedi Középkorász Muhely. ISBN 963-482-113-8.
- Langó, Péter (2005). "Archaeological research on the conquering Hungarians: a review". In Mende, Balázs Gusztáv (ed.). Research on the Prehistory of the Hungarians: Review: Papers Presented at the Meetings of the Institute of Archaeology of the HAS, 2003–2004. Archaeological Institute of the HAS. pp. 175–340. ISBN 963-7391-87-8.
- László, Gyula (1996). The Magyars: Their Life and Civilisation. Corvina. ISBN 963-13-4226-3.
- Macartney, C. A. (1953). The Medieval Hungarian Historians: A Critical & Analytical Guide. Cambridge University Press.
- Molnár, Miklós (2001). A Concise History of Hungary. Cambridge University Press. ISBN 978-0-521-66736-4.
- Róna-Tas, András (1999). Hungarians and Europe in the Early Middle Ages: An Introduction to Early Hungarian History (Translated by Nicholas Bodoczky). CEU Press. ISBN 978-963-9116-48-1.
- Spinei, Victor (2003). The Great Migrations in the East and South East of Europe from the Ninth to the Thirteenth Century (Translated by Dana Badulescu). Romanian Cultural Institute. ISBN 973-85894-5-2.
- Szabados, György (2011). Magyar államalapítások a IX-X. században [Foundations of the Hungarian States in the 9th–10th Centuries] (in Hungarian). Szegedi Középkorász Műhely. ISBN 978-963-08-2083-7.
- Szíj, Enikő (2005). "The past and present of the research on the prehistory of the Hungarians:Historiography". In Mende, Balázs Gusztáv (ed.). Research on the Prehistory of the Hungarians: Review: Papers Presented at the Meetings of the Institute of Archaeology of the HAS, 2003–2004. Archaeological Institute of the HAS. pp. 115–156. ISBN 963-7391-87-8.
- Tóth, Sándor László (1998). Levédiától a Kárpát-medencéig [From Levedia to the Carpathian Basin] (in Hungarian). Szegedi Középkorász Műhely. ISBN 963-482-175-8.
- Tóth, Sándor László (2005). "The past and present of the research on the prehistory of the Hungarians:Historiography". In Mende, Balázs Gusztáv (ed.). Research on the Prehistory of the Hungarians: Review: Papers Presented at the Meetings of the Institute of Archaeology of the HAS, 2003–2004. Archaeological Institute of the HAS. pp. 45–86. ISBN 963-7391-87-8.
- Türk, Attila (Summer 2012). "The new archaeological research design for early Hungarian history" (PDF). Hungarian Archaeology. hungarianarchaeology.hu. Archived from the original (PDF) on 4 March 2016.
- Veres, Péter (2004). "The Uralic and Hungarian ancestral homeland: the state of current research". In Nanovfszky, György (ed.). The Finno-Ugric World. Teleki László Foundation. pp. 31–36. ISBN 963-7081-01-1.
- Zimonyi, István (2005). "The state of the research on the prehistory of the Hungarians: Historiography (Oriental sources, history of the Steppe)". In Mende, Balázs Gusztáv (ed.). Research on the Prehistory of the Hungarians: Review: Papers Presented at the Meetings of the Institute of Archaeology of the HAS, 2003–2004. Archaeological Institute of the HAS. pp. 87–102. ISBN 963-7391-87-8.
