= Balasko =

Balasko or Balaskó is a surname. Notable people with the surname include:

- Iván Balaskó (born 1979), Hungarian football player
- Josiane Balasko (born 1950), French actress, writer, and director
- Nándor Balaskó (1918–1996), Romanian sculptor
- Yves Balasko (born 1945), French economist
