= Szikszai =

Szikszai or Szikszay is a surname. Notable people with the surname include:

- Lajos Szikszai (1825–1897), Hungarian revolutionary and politician
- Réka Szikszay (born 1965), former professional tennis player from Hungary
- Róbert Szikszai (born 1994), Hungarian athlete specialising in the discus throw
