= Monument to Endre Ady, Zalău =

Monument to Endre Ady
- Interactive map of Monument to Endre Ady
- Location: 1 Unirii Street, Zalău
- Coordinates: 47.1786°N 23.0546°E
- Designer: Nándor Balaskó
- Material: Bronze
- Completion date: 1957
- Opening date: November 22, 1957
- Dedicated to: Endre Ady

Monument to Endre Ady is a monument in Zalău, Romania.

It was opened in front of Silvania National College, on November 22, 1957 (80 years after the birth of Endre Ady).
