= Eastern Hungarians =

Ethnic group

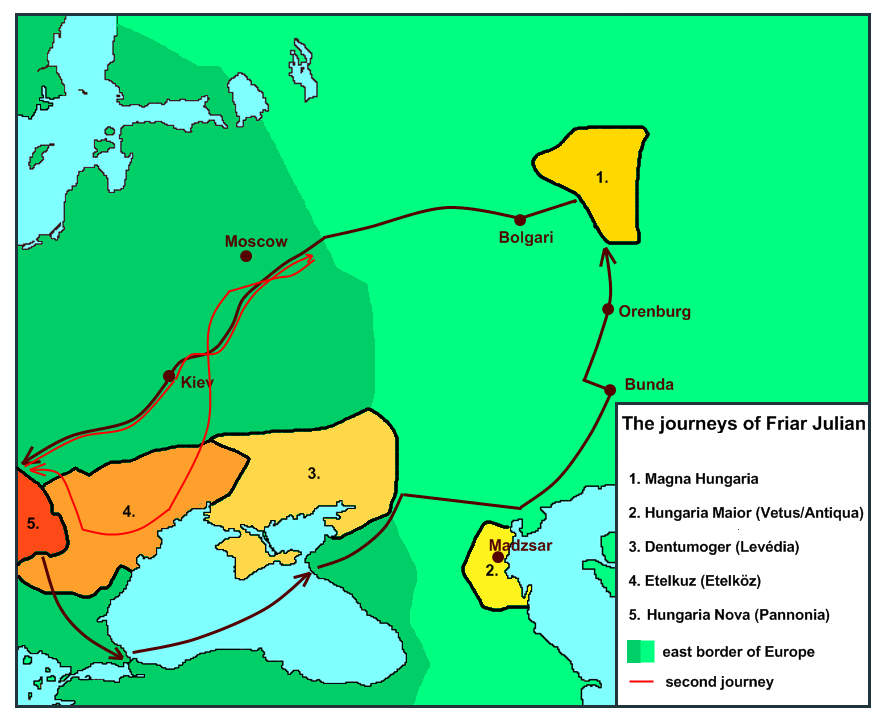
Friar Julian's journey in the beginning of the 1250s.

The term Eastern Hungarians (Hungarian: Keleti magyarok; also called Eastern Magyars) is used in scholarship to refer to peoples related to the Proto-Hungarians, that is, theoretically parts of the ancient community that remained along eastern parts of the Eurasian Steppe, such as in Siberia, Kazakhstan, the Urals and the Caucasus, and as such did not participate in the Hungarian conquest of the Carpathian Basin.

== The possible locations of the remnants of Hungarians ==
Madjars

The Madjars, a Turkic ethnic group in Kazakhstan have been labelled as Eastern Hungarians, with genetic analysis placing them closer to the Hungarian population than to their geographic neighbours.

=== Yugra ===
Yugra (Greek: Οὔγγροι) has been believed by some to have been the Hungarian Urheimat (homeland), which is today inhabited by the Mansi and Khanty, two related ethnic groups.

=== Magna Hungaria ===
The term "Eastern Hungarians" is also used in relation to the Magna Hungaria of Friar Julian (fl. 1235), located at Bashkortostan (the land of the Bashkirs). where Julian was able to communicate with the locals in his Hungarian language.

=== Savard Hungarians ===
According to Hungarian scholarship, there was a group of "Savard Hungarians" that broke off and moved across the Caucasus into Persian territory in the 8th century.

=== Theory of Kummagyaria ===
There is also the theory of "Kummagyaria" (Latin: Cummageria), in which a group that stayed behind possessed a country north of the Caucasus. According to László Bendefy, the approximate location of Kummagyaria is the riparian area of the Kuma River, Southern Russia. Odorico Raynaldi (1595–1671) mentioned Papal relations with Jeretany (Hungarian: Gyeretyán), called the ruler of Hungarians, Malkaites and Alans, in the 1320s. Earlier, Polish diplomat Andrzej Taranowski (1569) had mentioned the latter information. In 1712, the French traveller Aubrey de la Motraye passed through the area. His notes state that from what he heard from the local Tatar population, he maintained that the city of Mazsar was formerly inhabited by Magyars.

== See also ==
- Hungarian prehistory
- Hungarian people

== Sources ==
- Pál Engel (22 July 2005). Realm of St. Stephen: A History of Medieval Hungary. I.B.Tauris. p. 99. ISBN 978-1-85043-977-6.
- Iván Boldizsár (1988). The New Hungarian Quarterly. Vol. 29. Lapkiadó Publishing House. p. 127.
- András Róna-Tas (1982). Chuvash studies. Akadémiai Kiadó. p. 52. ISBN 978-963-05-2851-1.
