= Lajos Bíró (zoologist) =

Hungarian zoologist (1856–1931)

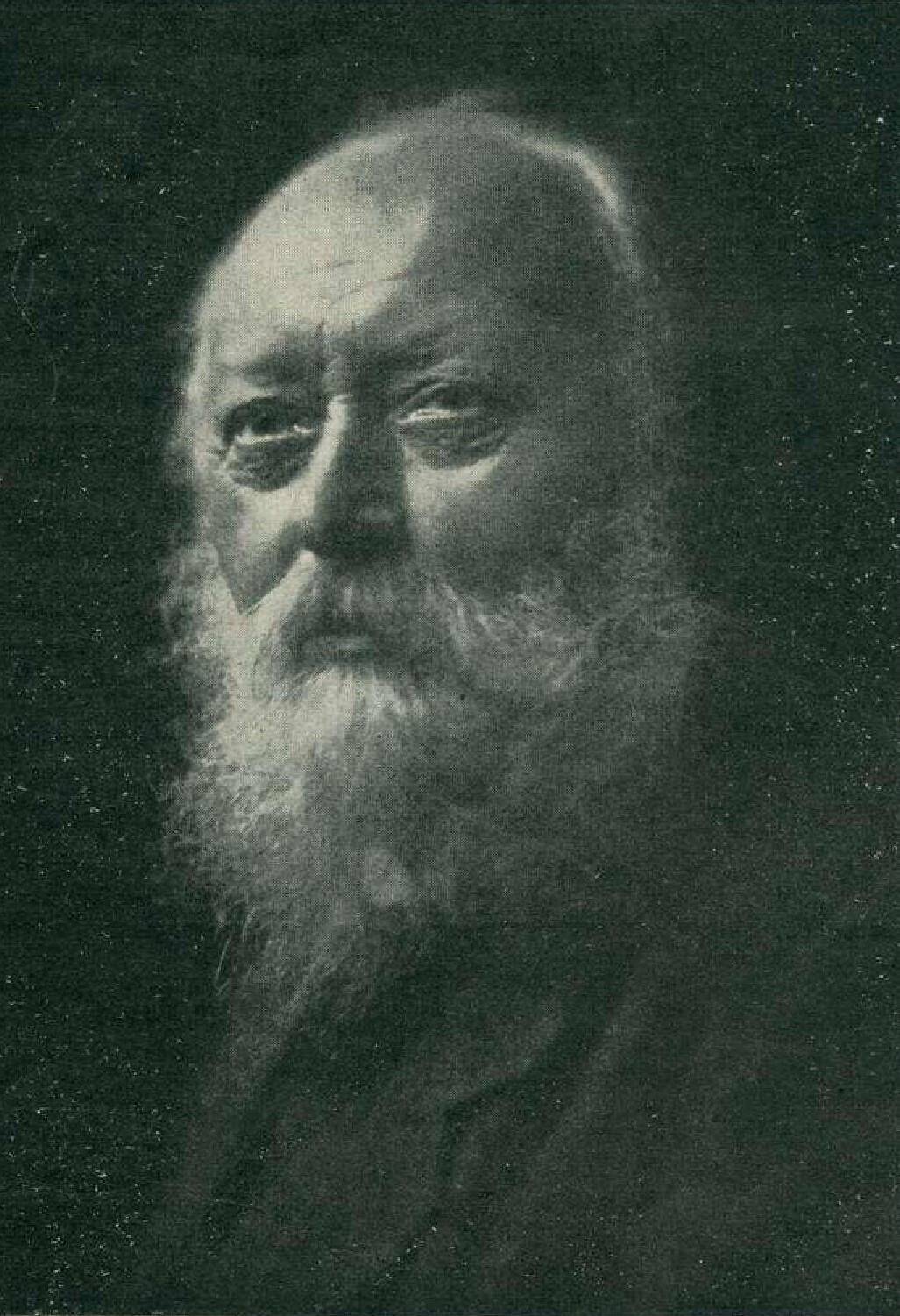
- Born: August 29, 1856; Tasnád
- Died: September 2, 1931 (aged 75); Budapest
- Occupation: Zoologist

Lajos Bíró (August 29, 1856 – September 2, 1931) was a zoologist from Hungary. He explored Papua New Guinea between 1896 and 1902 and collected nearly 200000 specimens of which 2400 species were new to science. Many species, such as the beetle Catascopus biroi, were named after him.

He graduated from the Calvinist College in Zilah.

== Works ==
- (1882): Adatok Zemplén megye természetrajzi ismeretéhez 2. Dr. Chyzer Kornél gyűjteményének bogarai. Magyar Orvosok és Természetvizsgálók XXII. Debrecenben 1882 évben tartott vándorgyűlésének munkálatai. 1–54.
- (1896): Levelek Új-Guineából. Természettudományi Közlöny XXVIII: 533–542, 552–588, 629–634.
- (1897): Biró Lajos levelei Új-Guineából. Természettudományi Közlöny XXIX (333): 241–248.
- (1897) Levelek Új-Guineából. Természettudományi Közlöny (29): 19-27, 67–69, 191–198, 241–248, 365–369, 469–474.
- (1898): Levelek Új-Guineából. Természettudományi Közlöny (30): 592–595, 658–660.
- (1899): Biró Lajos német-új-guineai (berlinhafeni) néprajzi gyűjteményének leíró jegyzéke. Beschreibender Catalog der ethnographischen Sammlung Ludwig Biró’s aus Deutsch-Neu-Guinea (Berlinhafen). Összeállította Jankó János. A Magyar Nemzeti Múzeum Néprajzi Gyűjteményei. Budapest: Hornyánszky.
- (1899): Levelek Új-Guineából. Termászettudományi Közlöny (31): 74–75, 137–140, 202–204, 293–298, 358–359, 471–473, 578–583.
- (1900): Levelek Új- Guineából. Természettudományi Közlöny (32): 103–104, 241–242, 351–356, 473–475, 516–518.
- (1901): Biró Lajos új-guineai (Astrolabe-öböl) néprajzi gyűjteményének leíró jegyzéke. Beschreibender Catalog der ethnographischen Sammlung Ludwig Biró’s aus Deutsch-Neu-Guinea (Astrolabe-Bai). Össszeállította Semayer Vilibáld. A Magyar Nemzeti Múzeum Néprajzi Gyűjteményei 3. Budapest: Hornyánszky.
- (1903): Kökorszakbeli élet a jelenben. (3 előadás). Természettudományi Közlöny (35): 771.
- (1919): Első látogatásom a Pápuákhoz. A Természet (1919. junius 1–15.)
- (1923): Az én vadembereim. Az Est (1923. május 27, június 5.)
- (1923): A vadember kőbaltája. Az Est (1923. julius 20.)
- (1923): Hét év Új-Guineában. Levelek két világrészből. (A Hat világrész–utazások és felfedezések, 6.) Budapest: Világirodalmi.
- (1930): A beszélő papíros. Természettudományi Közlöny (62): 193–210.
- (1930): Új-Guineai emlékeimből. Milyen állatokat ismernek a pápuák? Természettudományi Közlöny (62): 481–488.
- (1930): Új-Guineai emlékeimből. I. Milyen állatokat ismernek a pápuák? Természettudományi Közlöny (62): 481–488.
- (1931): Új-Guineai emlékeimből. II. Milyen madarakat ismernek a pápuák? Természettudományi Közlöny (63): 33–45.
- (1932): Újguineai utazásom emlékei. Szerk.: Szabó-Patay József (Népszerű természettudományi könyvtár 13) Budapest: Királyi Magyar Természettudományi Társulat.
- (1987): Hat év Új-Guineában. Válogatott írások. Bodrogi Tibor (szerk.) (A magyar néprajz klasszikusai). Budapest: Gondolat.

== Gallery ==
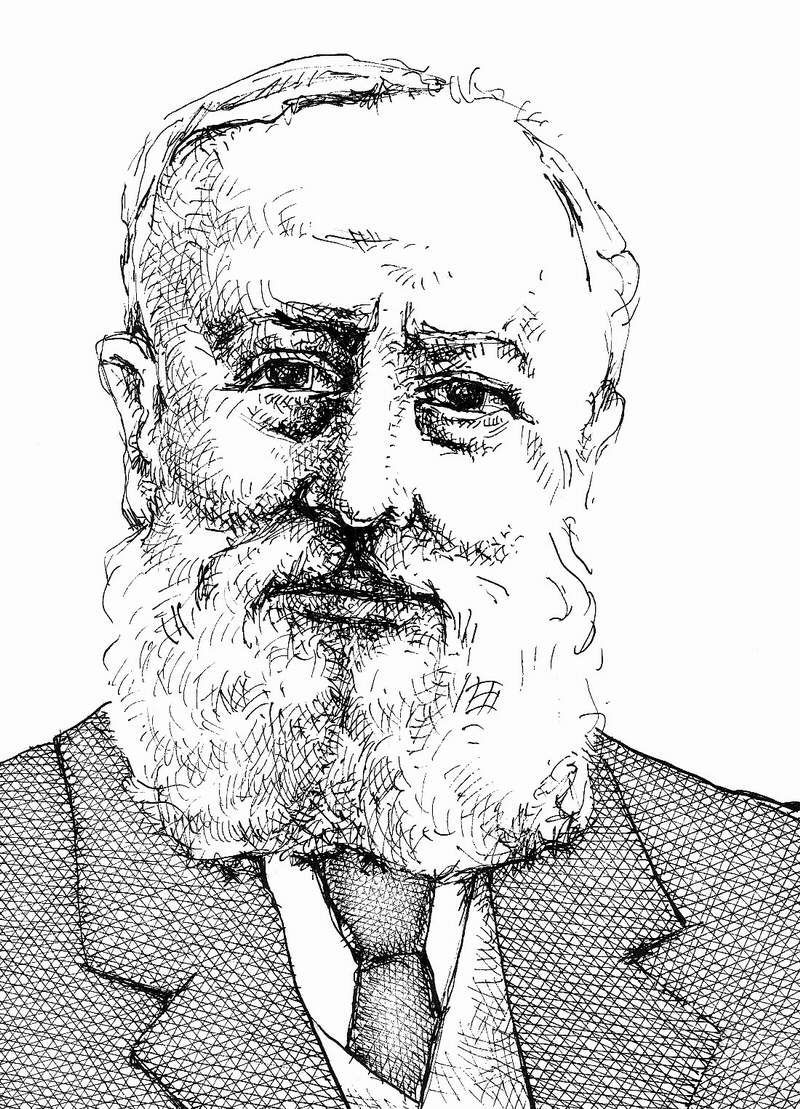

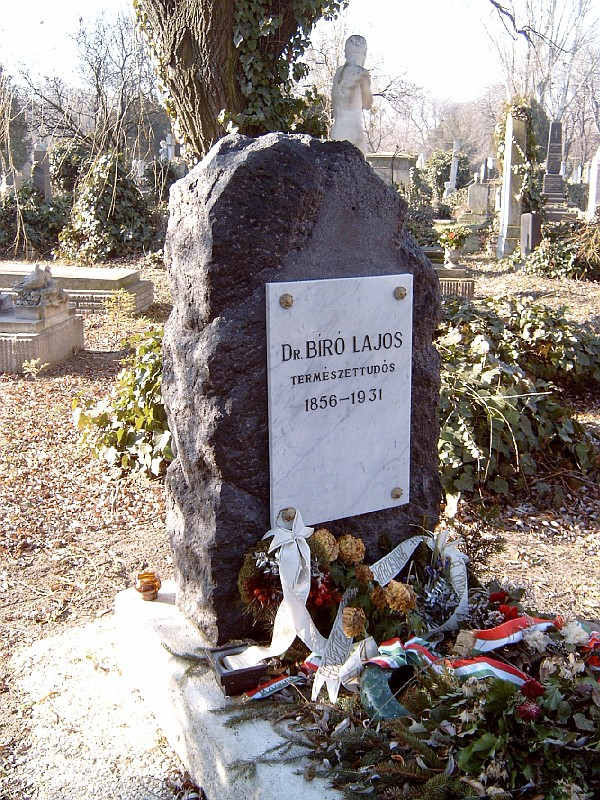
