= Lajos Szikszai =

Hungarian politician (1825–1897)

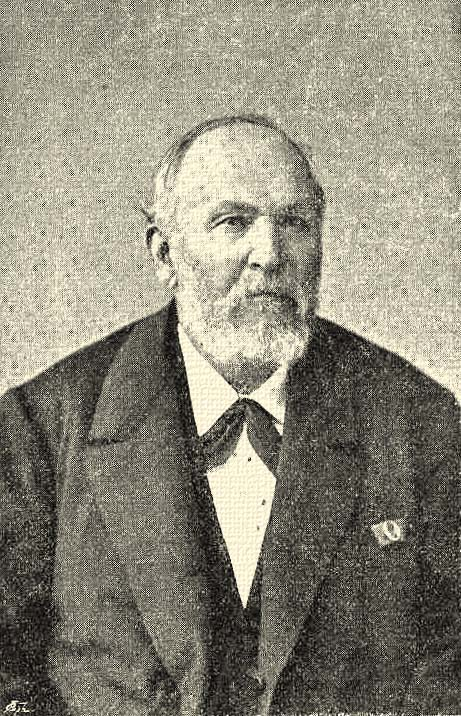
- Born: November 25, 1825; Szilágysámson, Kingdom of Hungary, Austrian Empire
- Died: August 27, 1897 (aged 71); Zilah, Kingdom of Hungary, Austria-Hungary
- Occupation: Politician

Lajos Szikszai (November 25, 1825 – August 31, 1897) was a Hungarian revolutionary, politician, Member of Parliament, vicecomes of Szilágy County and art collector.

Szikszai was born in Szilágysámson (Șamșud) into a noble family. After 1840, he studied at the Calvinist high school in Zilah (Zalău). He was a participant at the Hungarian Revolution of 1848. From 1862, Szikszai worked as a lawyer. In 1875, he became a member of the National Assembly of Hungary and from 1883 he was the vicecomes of Szilágy County. In 1880, Lajos Szikszai donated his private collection to the municipality and the first museum in Zilah was created. In his last years, he initiated the construction of the Tuhutum Monument, once located in a park in Zalău named after Lajos Szikszai.

== Honours ==
- Şcoala Gimnazială "Szikszai Lajos"
