= Burgruine Kollmitz =

Ruined castle in Lower Austria, Austria

Coordinates: 48°49′18″N 15°32′00″E

- Lower Austria, Austria
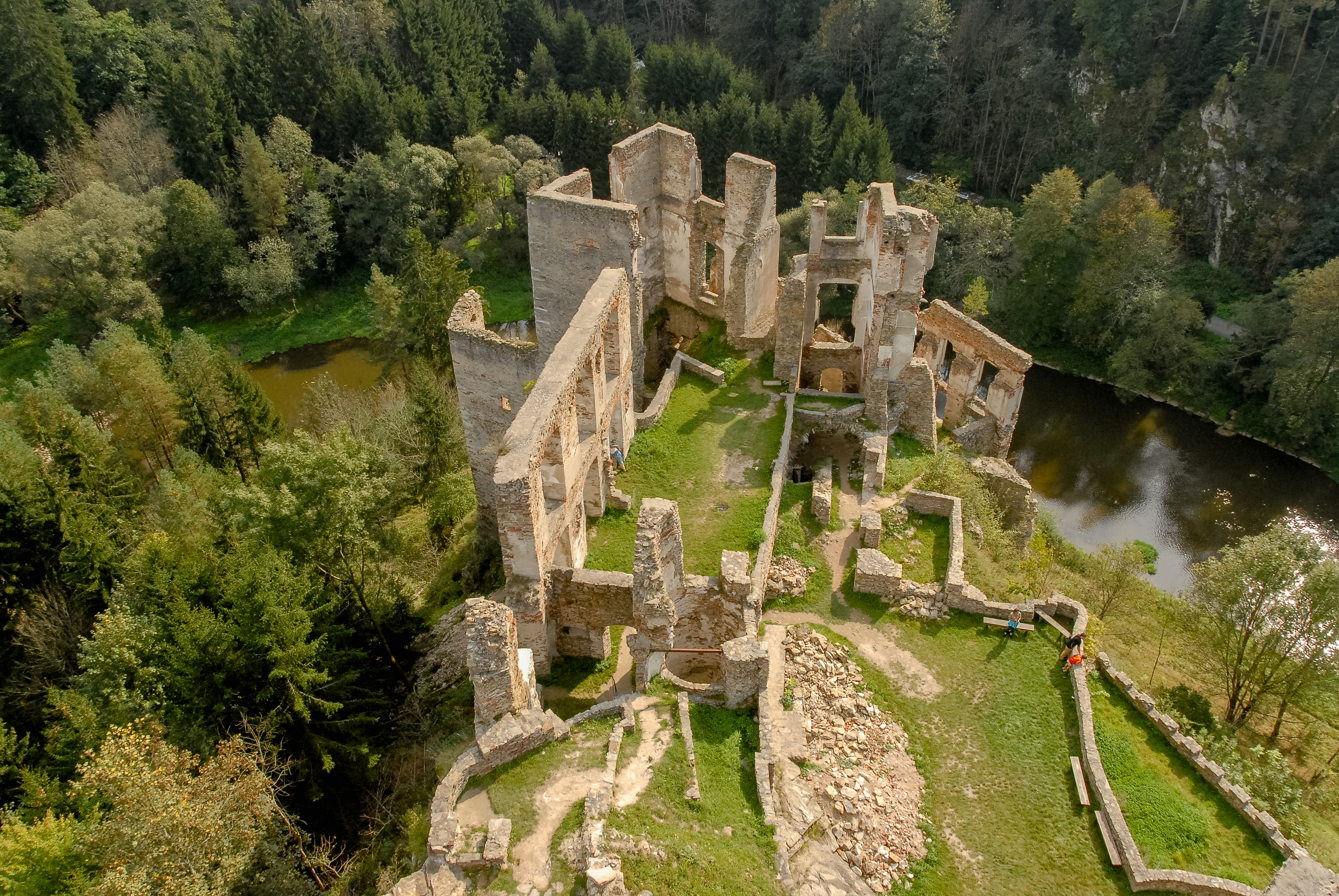

Site information
- Type: Castle

Site history
- Built: 13th Century

Kollmitz Castle (German: Burgruine Kollmitz, lit. “castle ruins of Kollmitz”) is a ruined castle in Lower Austria, Austria. The Castle was first mentioned in the 13th century and the construction of its main tower was completed in 1319.

In the 14th century the castle was used as a district court with ownership changing often. In 1411 the Freiherr von Hofkirchen came into possession of the castle, whose family would control the castle for the next two centuries. The Hofkirchen family lost possession of the castle in 1611 when Wolfgang von Hofkirchen died in exile in Prague during the Habsburg's Counter Reformation, which saw him as a ringleader of Protestant nobility.

Following the end of Hofkirchen control, the castle changed hands several times and may even have been abandoned. In 1708 the Castle was acquired by Franz Anton von Quarient und Raal under whom the castle fell into disrepair as it no longer could serve any practical purpose.

== See also ==
- List of castles in Austria
