= János Sajnovics =

Hungarian linguist, astronomer and Jesuit priest (1733–85)

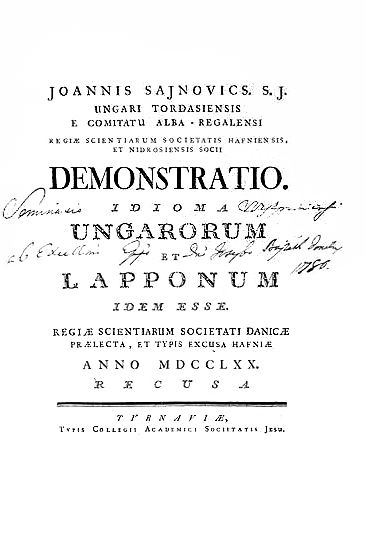
The Demonstratio

János Sajnovics de Tordas et Káloz (Tordas, 12 May 1733 – Pest, 4 May 1785) was a Hungarian linguist and member of the Jesuit order. He is best known for his pioneering work in comparative linguistics, particularly his systematic demonstration of the linguistic relationship between the Sami languages and Hungarian.

== Biography ==
Sajnovics was born in Tordas, Hungary. He became a pupil of the astronomer and mathematician Maximilian Hell.

When Hell planned an expedition to observe the transit of Venus in Vardø, northern Norway of June 1769, he took Sajnovics with him. Hell had heard that the Hungarian and Lapp (Sami) languages were related and thought that Sajnovics, as a native Hungarian speaker, would be able to investigate the connection.

Sajnovics published the results of his research in his book Demonstratio idioma Hungarorum et Lapporum idem esse (1770), which was seen as a breakthrough in the study of Uralic languages. His ideas were developed further by Sámuel Gyarmathi. He and Hell were elected members of the Royal Danish Academy of Sciences and Letters in 1790.

Sajnovics died age 51 in Pest, Hungary.
