= Sámuel Gyarmathi =

Hungarian linguist

Sámuel Gyarmathi (Hungarian: Gyarmathi Sámuel) (July 15, 1751, Kolozsvár — March 4, 1830, Kolozsvár) was a Hungarian linguist, born in Cluj (then Kolozsvár, Transylvania). He is best known for his systematic demonstration of the comparative history of the Finno-Ugric languages in the book Affinitas linguae hungaricae cum linguis fennicae originis grammatice demonstrata (1799), which rested on the earlier work of János Sajnovics.

== Life and works ==
Gyarmathi studied to be a teacher in Nagyenyed (Aiud) before training to be a doctor in Vienna, after which he practised medicine in Transylvania. In 1789 he read of a competition offering a prize for linguistic research in a Hungarian newspaper and spent the next two years working on his Okoskodva tanító magyar nyelvmester (Hungarian Grammar Taught Rationally). The Transylvanian Diet made funds available for its publication and it appeared in two volumes in 1794.

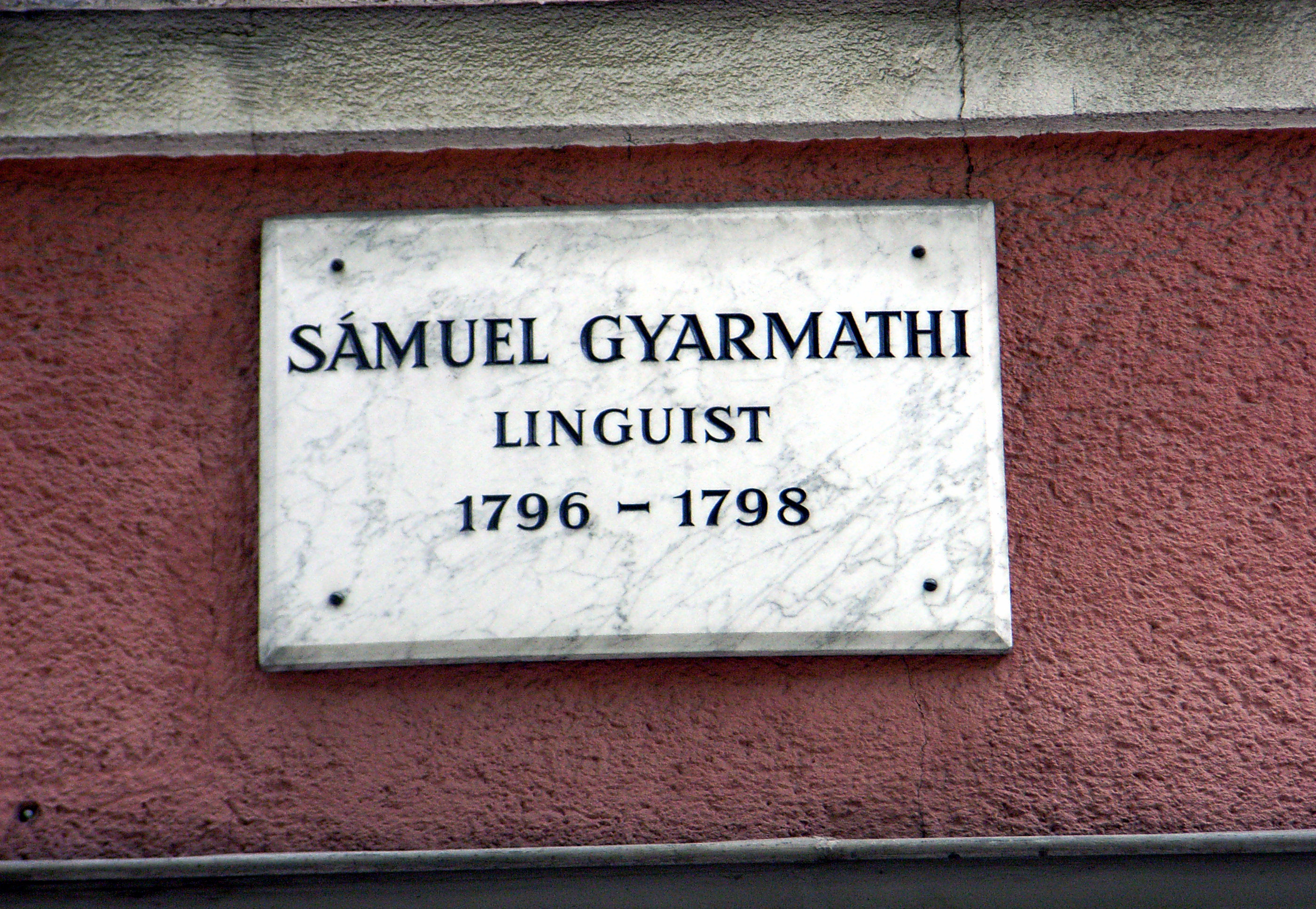
A plaque in Göttingen

Through the success of this book, Gyarmathi joined the household of Count Gergely Bethlen as a family physician and tutor to the Bethlen children. His position gave him plenty of leisure for his research into languages and allowed him to accompany Bethlen's son on a trip to the University of Göttingen in Germany, then a leading centre for comparative linguistics. Here he made the acquaintance of the historian August Ludwig von Schlözer, who was a specialist in Northern and Eastern Europe.

In Göttingen, Gyarmathi developed the theories of János Sajnovics, which had shown a relationship between Hungarian and Sami (Lapp). The result of Gyarmathi's studies was Affinitas, published in Göttingen in 1799. In the first part of the work, Gyarmathi compares Hungarian, Finnish and Sami. In the second, he treats of the similarities between Hungarian and Estonian. In the third, he covers several other Uralic languages. Affinitas sought to show that these languages were part of the same family, by demonstrating similarities in grammatical structure between them. The book was immediately recognised as a major contribution to linguistics.

After leaving Göttingen, Gyarmathi became a teacher/administrator at the Calvinist College in Zilah (Zalău), before returning to work as the family physician to the Bethlens in 1810. His last major work was Vocabularium, published in Vienna in 1816. This is a word list that compares Hungarian vocabulary with 57 other languages. It also contains valuable information on the Szekler dialect of Transylvania. Gyarmathi died in Cluj at the age of 79.

== See also ==
- Comparative method
