= Șamșud =

Șamșud Szilágysámson
- Commune
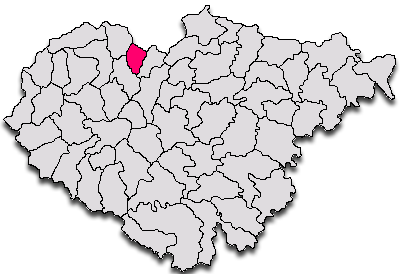
- Location in Sălaj County

- Location in Romania
- Coordinates: 47°20′45″N 22°57′12″E
- Country: Romania
- County: Sălaj

Government
  - Mayor (2020–2024): Zoltán Banto (UDMR)
- Area: 29.23 km^{2} (11.29 sq mi)
- Elevation: 200 m (660 ft)
- Population (2021-12-01): 1,785
  - Density: 61.07/km^{2} (158.2/sq mi)
- Time zone: UTC+02:00 (EET)
  - Summer (DST): UTC+03:00 (EEST)
- Postal code: 457325
- Area code: +(40) 0260
- Vehicle reg.: SJ
- Website: samsud.ro

Șamșud (Hungarian: Szilágysámson) is a commune located in Sălaj County, Crișana, Romania. It is composed of two villages, Șamșud and Valea Pomilor (Mocirla until 1956; Mocsolya).

The Șamșud gas field lies within the perimeter of the commune.

== Demographics ==
At the 2011 census, the commune had a population of 1,723; out of them, 91.7% were Hungarians, 4.9% Roma, and 1.6% Romanians. At the 2021 census, Șamșud had a population of 1,785; of those, 78.49% were Hungarians, 17.7% Roma, and 2.02% Romanians.

== Sights ==
- Orthodox church in Șamșud, built in the 19th century (1885), historic monument
- Reformed church in Șamșud, built in the 17th century
- Reformed church in Valea Pomilor, completed in 1794
