= Nándor Balaskó =

Romanian sculptor

- Born: August 30, 1918; Sălacea
- Died: June 28, 1996 (aged 77); Tauberbischofsheim

Nándor Balaskó (August 30, 1918 – June 28, 1996) was a sculptor from Romania.

Balaskó graduated from Silvania National College in 1937. He studied at the Bucharest National University of Arts (1937–40) and the Hungarian University of Fine Arts (1940–43). Then he worked with Ion Andreescu Institute of Fine and Decorative Art in Cluj Napoca. In 1958 he took part in the International Auschwitz-contest. In 1970, Balaskó emigrated to Sintra, Portugal.

== Exhibitions ==
Solo Exhibitions

- 1968, Little Gallery of Fine Arts, Cluj-Napoca
- 1990, Lisbon

Selected group exhibitions

- 1940, Bucharest, student festival
- 1941, 1942, 1943, Budapest
- 1943, Cluj-Napoca.

== Works in public places ==
- Monument to Endre Ady, Zalău (1957).

== Honours ==
- In Sălacea there is the Balaskó Nándor primary and secondary school and a kindergarten.

== Bibliography ==
- Szántó Tibor: Blaskó Nándor és Losonczi Nándor lipcsei vizsgamunkái. Magyar Grafika, 1964/. sz. 17-22. p.
- Vámfalvi M.: Felkerestük műtermében Blaskó Nándort. Új Élet, 1967
- Szőcs István: Balaskó Nándor. Helikon, 1991/10.
- Orbán István: Virágok vetélkedése. Egy Balaskó-szoborkompozíció nyomában. Művelődés, 2006/1. sz.
