= Silvania National College =

- Colegiul Național Silvania
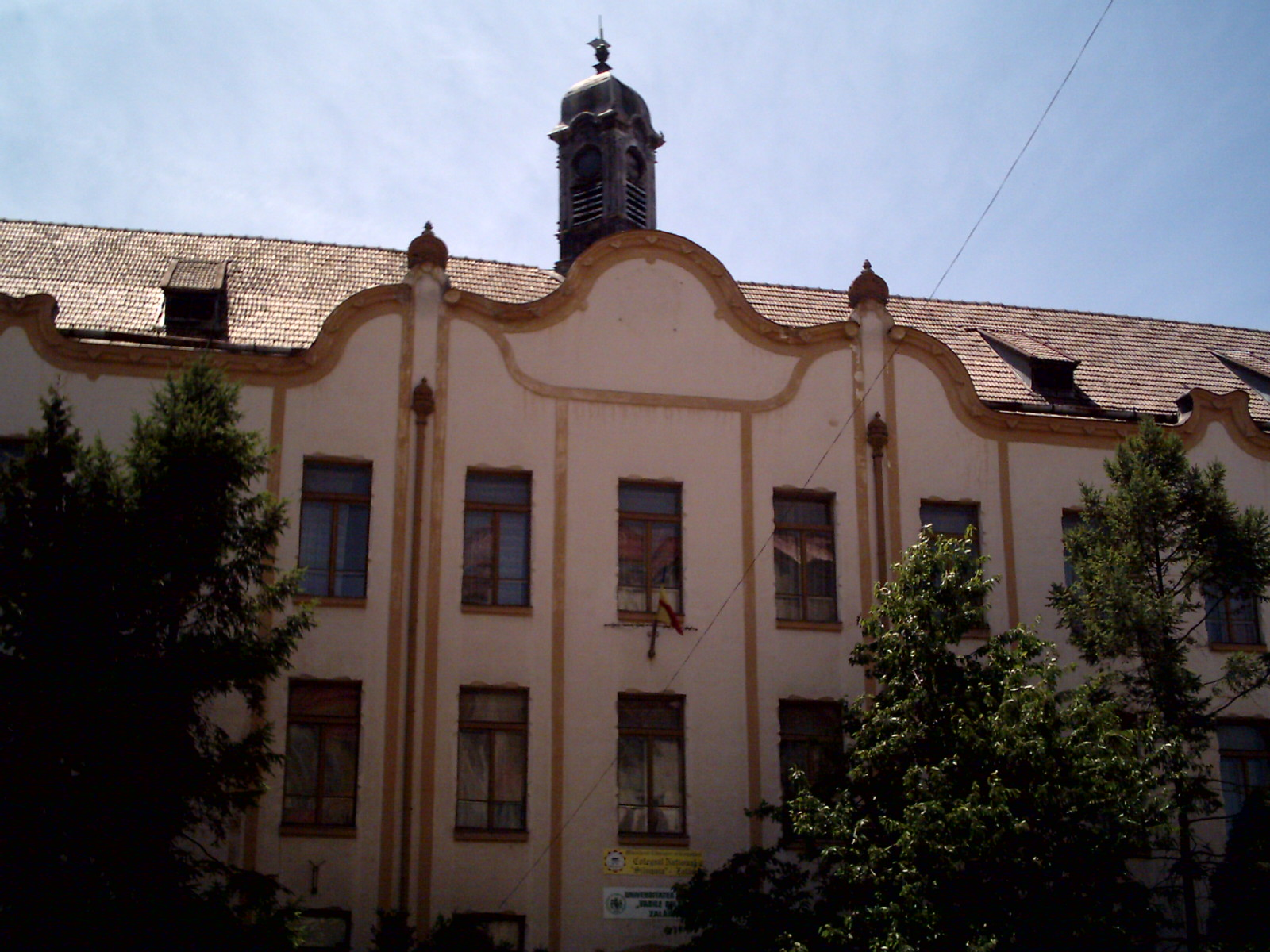

Location
- Strada Unirii, Nr. 1 Zalău, Sălaj County; Romania
- Coordinates: 47°10′44″N 23°3′9″E

Information
- Type: Public
- Established: 1646; 380 years ago
- Principal: Florin Morar
- Grades: 5–12
- Enrollment: 1,065 (in 2014)
- Website: www.cnszalau.ro

Silvania National College (Romanian: Colegiul Național Silvania, Hungarian: Silvania Főgimnázium) is a bilingual high school located at 1 Unirii Street, Zalău, Romania, with both Romanian and Hungarian language classes. In 2002 it had 949 students, of whom 747 participated in Romanian and 202 in Hungarian language education.

== History ==
The high school was formed by the Calvinist community in Zilah (present-day Zalău) in the first half of the 17th century. Initially, lessons were held in Latin, which was later replaced by Hungarian. In the 1830s, following a disagreement between the school and the church, Miklós Wesselényi took over the burden of the institution and paid the teachers wage and other fees himself. In remembrance of this service to the school, it later took the name of Wesselényi. In 1848, led by their teachers, the students from the upper class joined the Hungarian Revolution, for which after the failure of the revolution the college feared of abolition by the Habsburg authorities.

The main building of the high school was built in 1903 with the support of the Wesselényi family. In 1948, due to the Communist takeover, the school was nationalized and ceased to exist as a faith school. At this time it was renamed from Wesselényi Reformed College to simply Liceum nr. 2 and served as a Hungarian language institution. In 1960 it was unified with the Romanian language high school and since then language education has been given in both languages. Between 1953 and 1965, the high school was called Ady Endre (for a notable former graduate), then Liceul de Matematică-Fizică, Liceul Teoretic and, after 2001, Colegiul Național "Silvania".

== List of graduates ==
- Endre Ady (1877–1919) graduated in 1896
- Nándor Balaskó (1918–1996), sculptor, graduated in 1937
- Lajos Bíró (1856–1931), zoologist, ethnographer
- Victor Deleu (1876–1940), politician
- Iulian Andrei Domsa (1887–1978), jurist, politician, graduated in 1906
- Sámuel Gyarmathi (1751–1830), physician, linguist
- Gyula Kincs (1856–1915) principal of the college
- Béla Kun (1886–1938), politician
- Iuliu Maniu (1873–1953), politician, graduated in 1890
- Gyula Márton (1916–1976) linguist, university professor, prorector of the University of Cluj
- János Moldován (1905–1977) painter, art teacher and director of the college, graduated in 1923
- Lajos Szikszai (1825–1897), politician
- Benjamin Zörgő (1916–1980), psychologist, professor

== Gallery ==
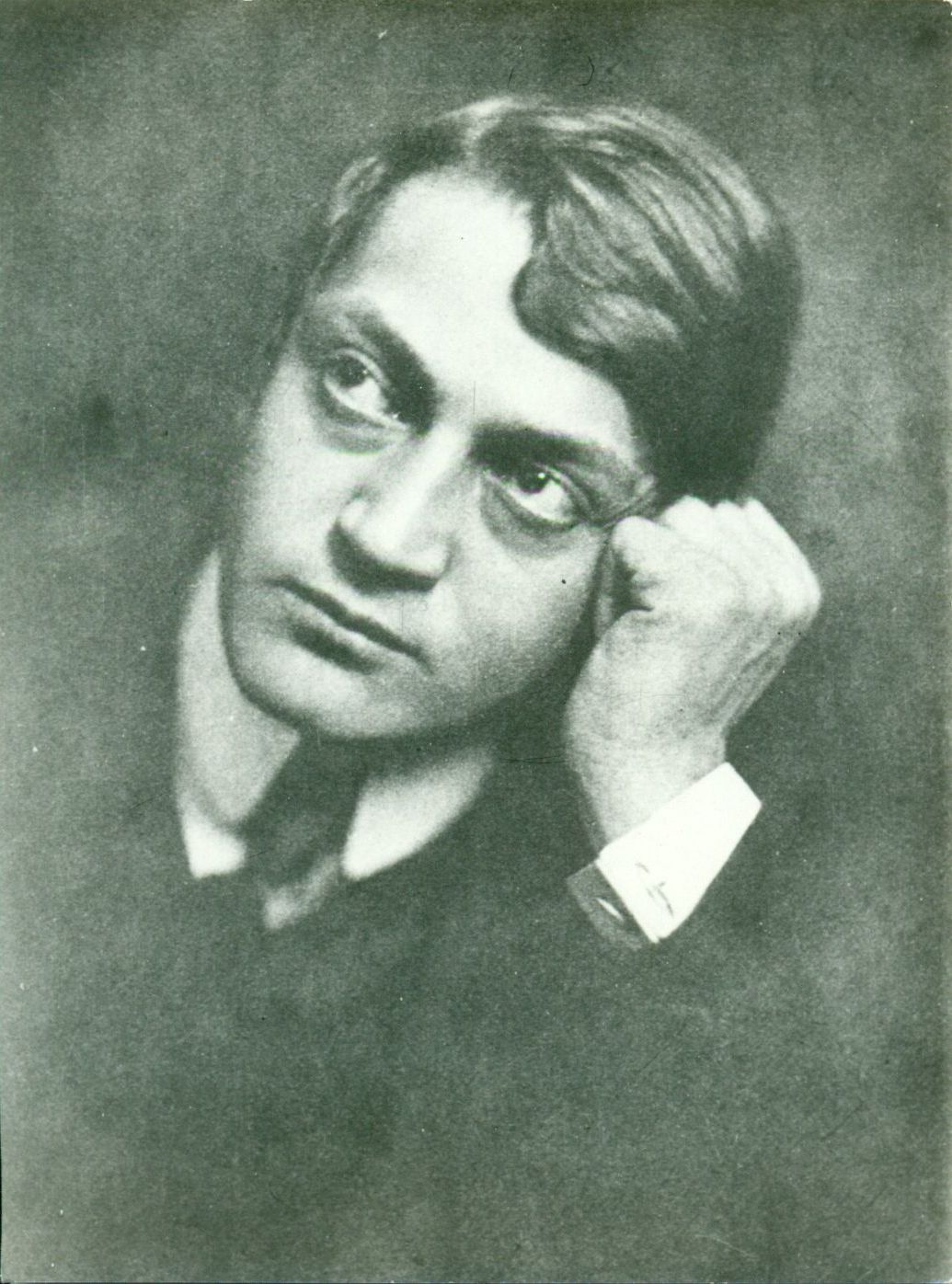
Endre Ady graduated in 1896

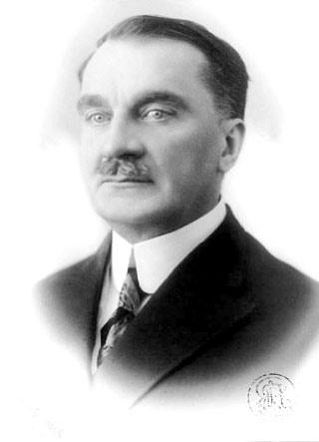
Iuliu Maniu graduated in 1890

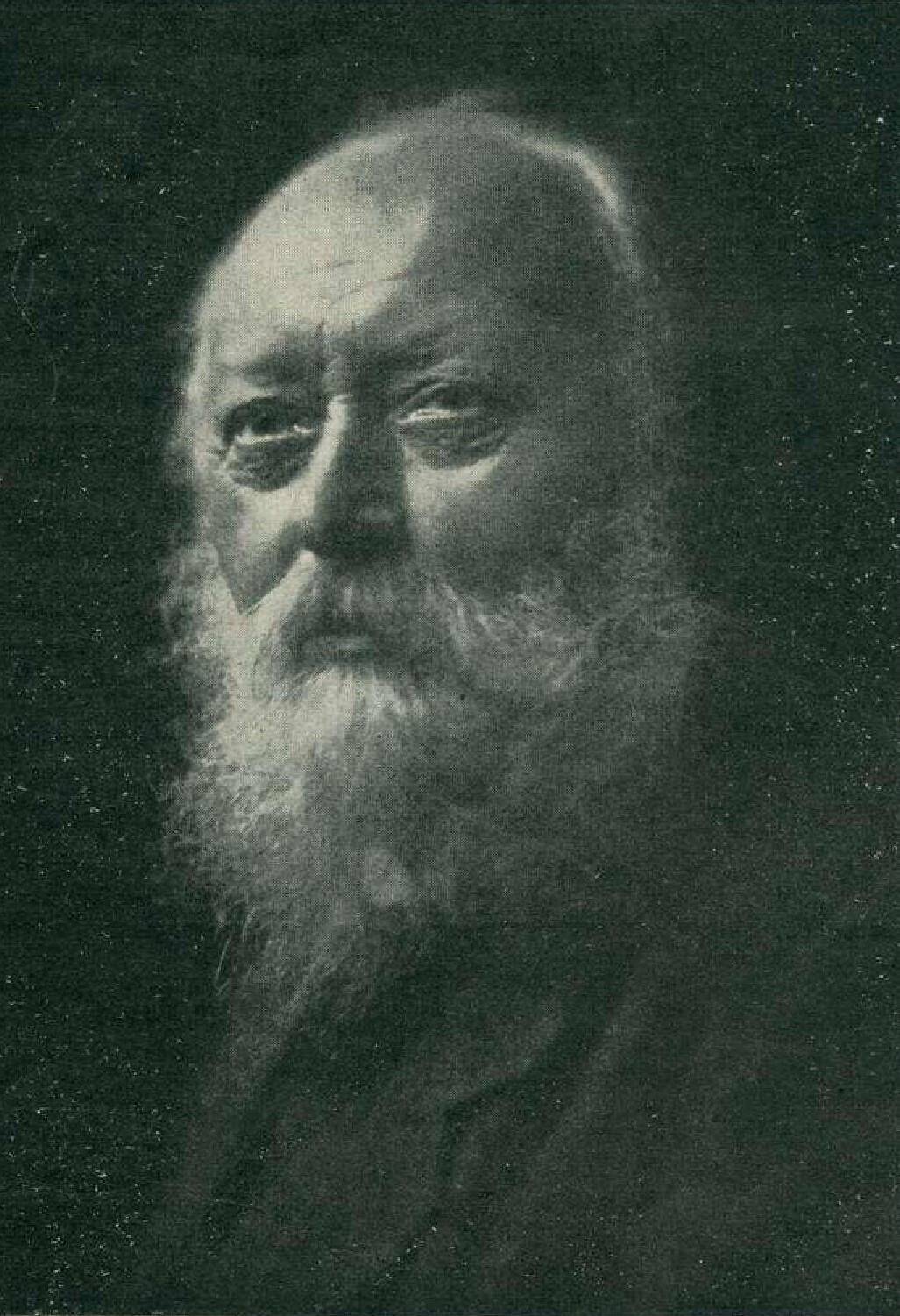
Lajos Bíró (1856–1931)

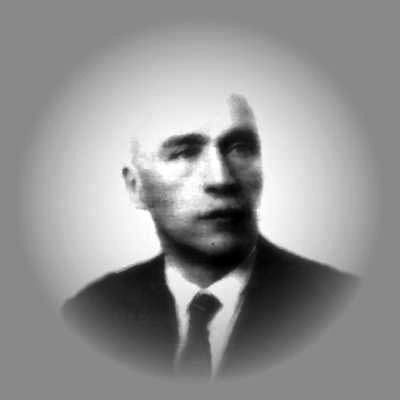
Victor Deleu (1876–1939)

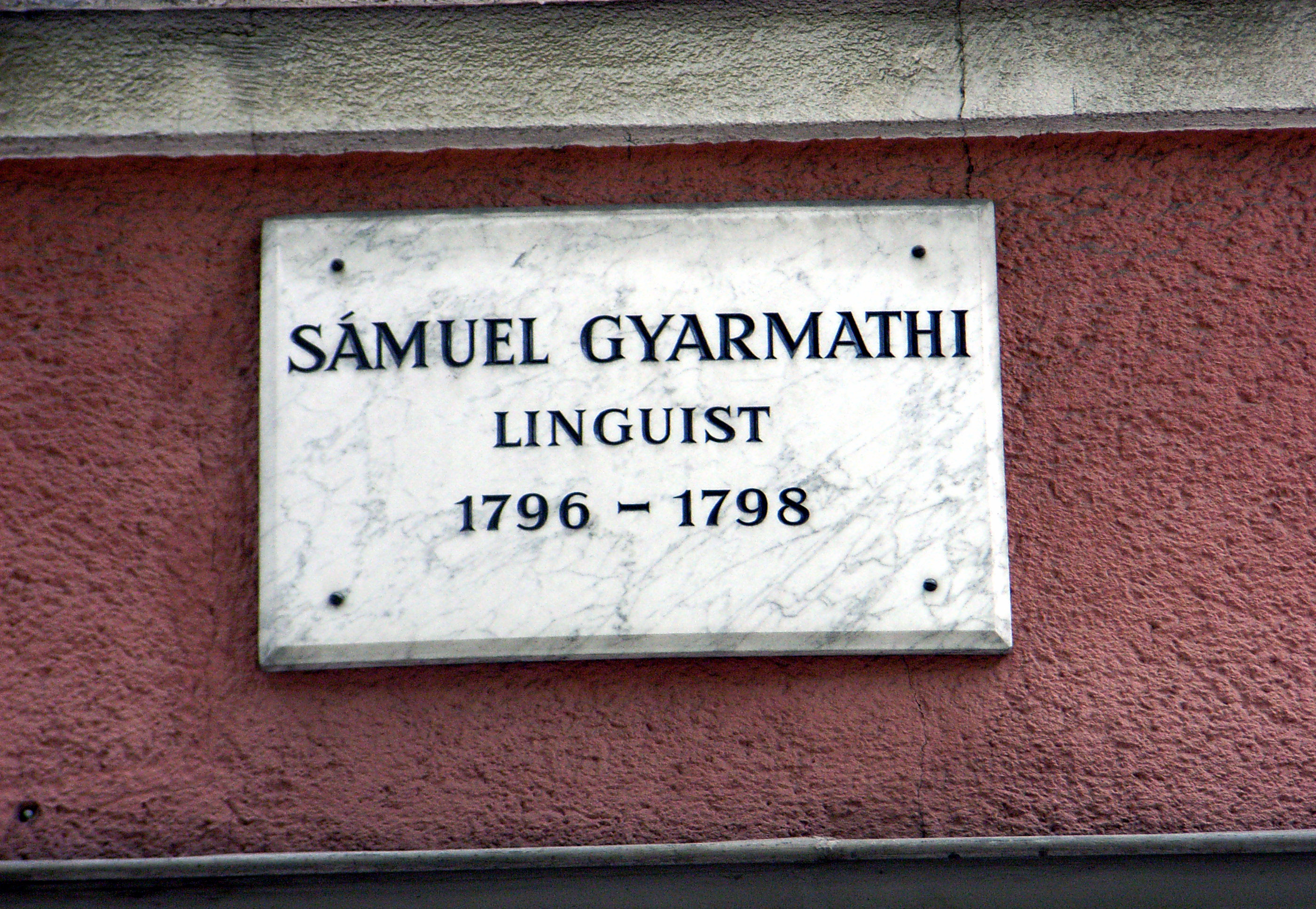
Sámuel Gyarmathi (1751–1830)
