= Jibou Botanical Garden =

Botanical garden in Romania

Coordinates: 47°15′N 23°15′E

Vasile Fati Botanical Garden
- Grădina Botanică „Vasile Fati”
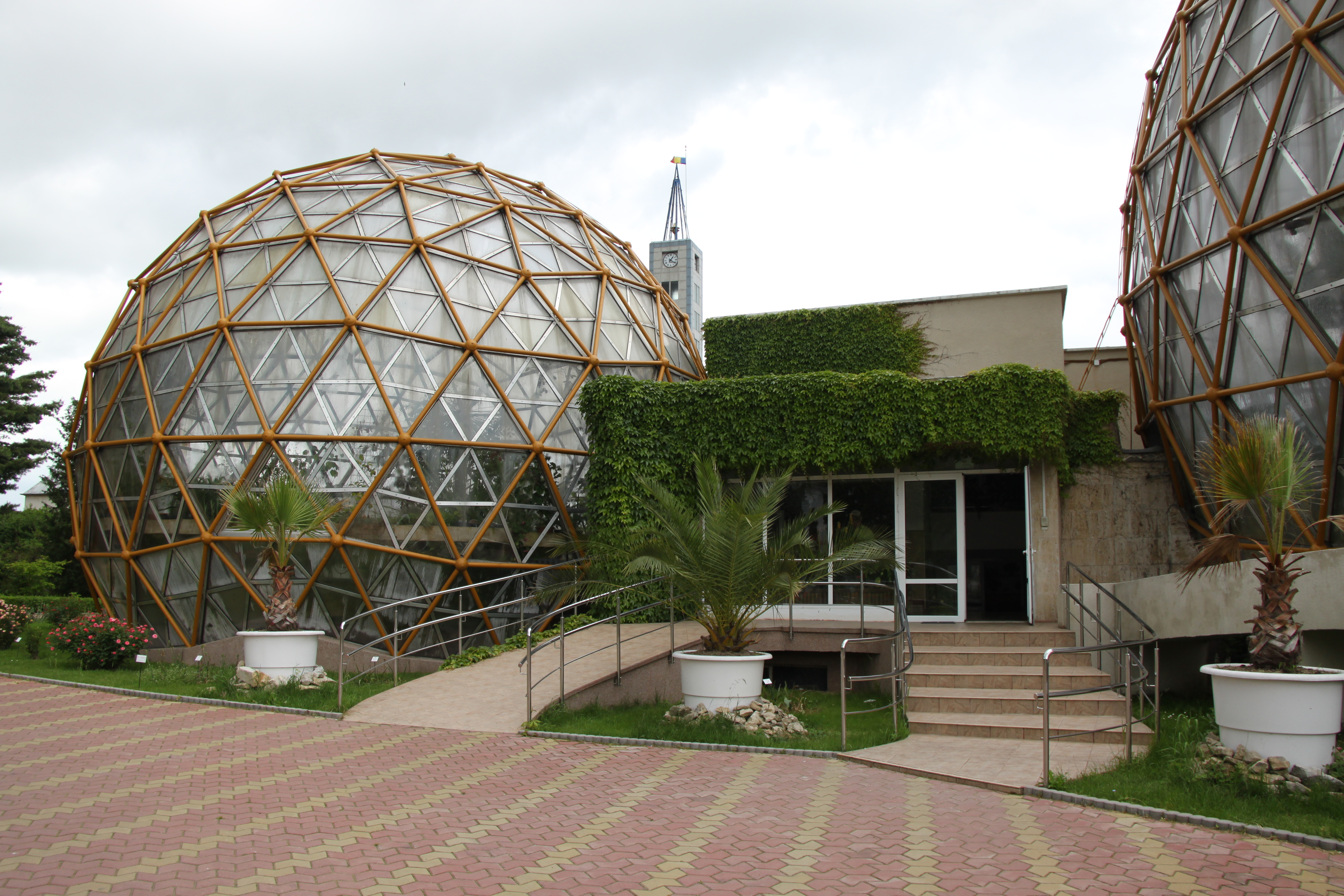
- Main greenhouses
- Interactive map of Vasile Fati Botanical Garden
- Type: Botanical garden, public park
- Location: Park Street 14, Jibou, Sălaj County, Romania
- Area: 25 acres (10 ha)
- Elevation: 272 m (892 ft)
- Created: 1968
- Founder: Vasile Fati
- Operator: Jibou Institute of Biological Research
- Status: Open all year
- Website: ccbjb.ro

The Jibou Botanical Garden (Romanian: Grădina Botanică a Institutului de Cercetări Biologice din Jibou), now named after its founder, Vasile Fati (1932–2007), is a botanical garden located in Jibou, Romania.

The Botanical Garden is situated in the north-east side of Jibou, on the second bank of Someș River. The Botanical Garden has a surface of 25 acres (10 ha) and has been arranged inside the architectural ensemble at the Wesselényi residence beginning with the year 1968.

== History ==
The works for the organization of the Botanical Garden from Jibou started between the years 1959–1968, when Vasile Fati (1932–2007), a biology teacher, with the students and with the other teachers manages to prove that the parks around Wesselényi Castle, where the high school was functioning is appropriate for a botanical garden.

Between the years 1968–1970 the first greenhouse of 110 square metres (1,200 sq ft) was built. Between the years 1978–1982, two more greenhouses were built, the aquarium and the volar. The Botanical Garden “Vasile Fati” in incorporated in the Botanical Gardens' Association from Romania (B.G.A.R) with the other botanical gardens.

== Gallery ==
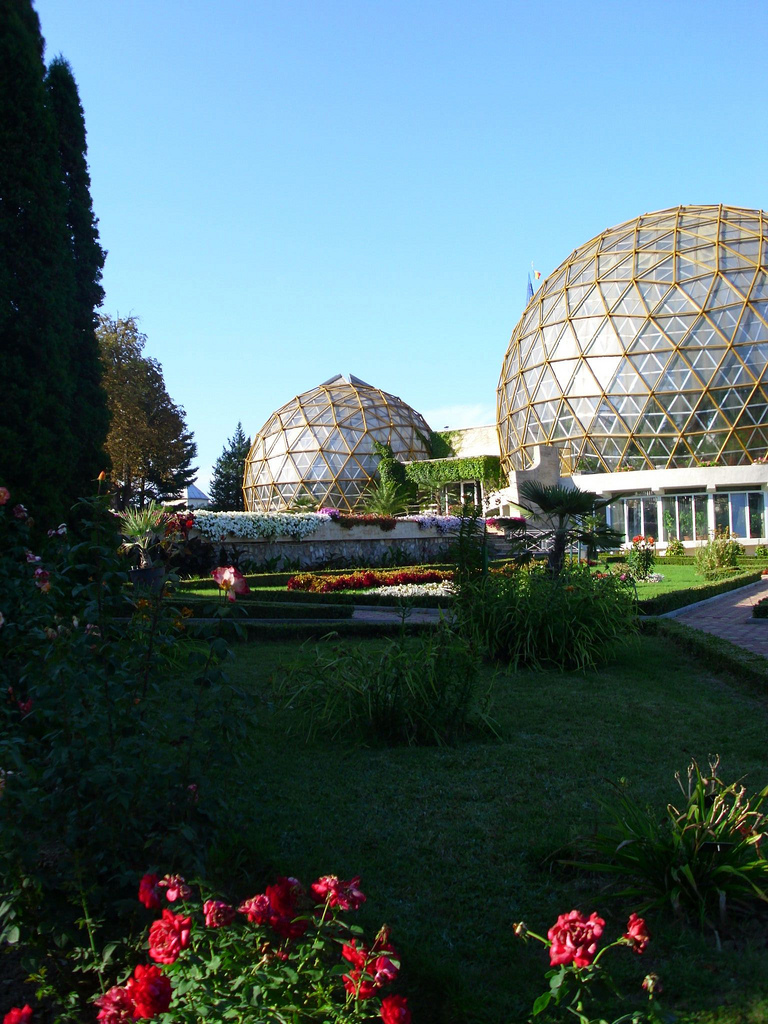

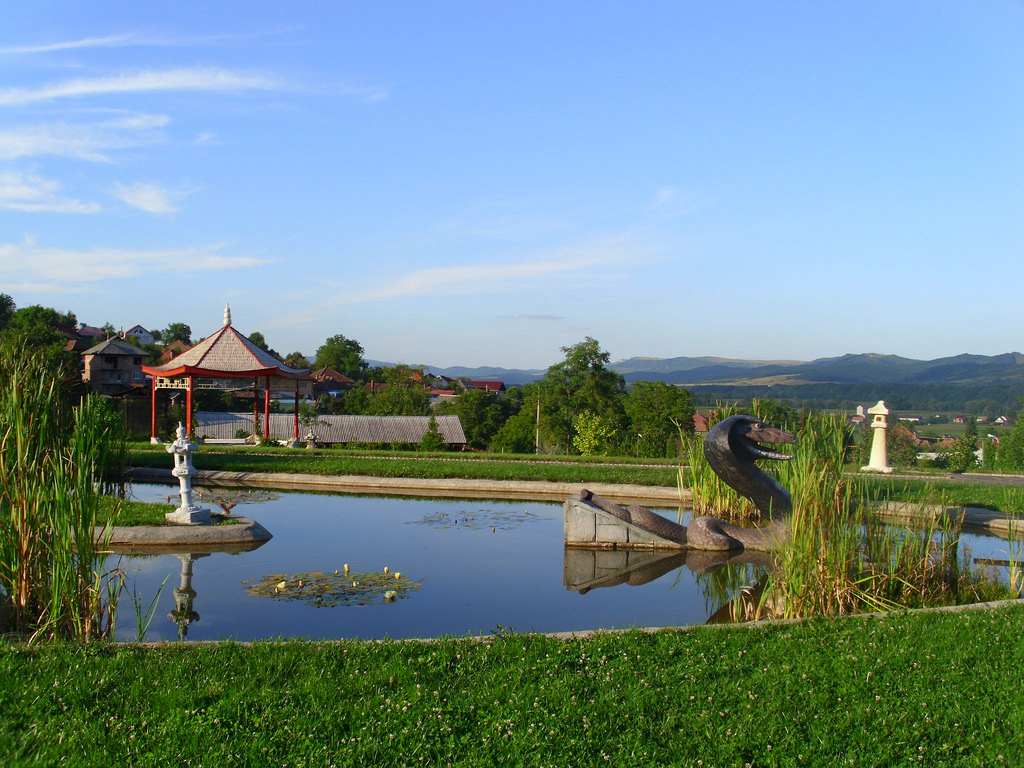

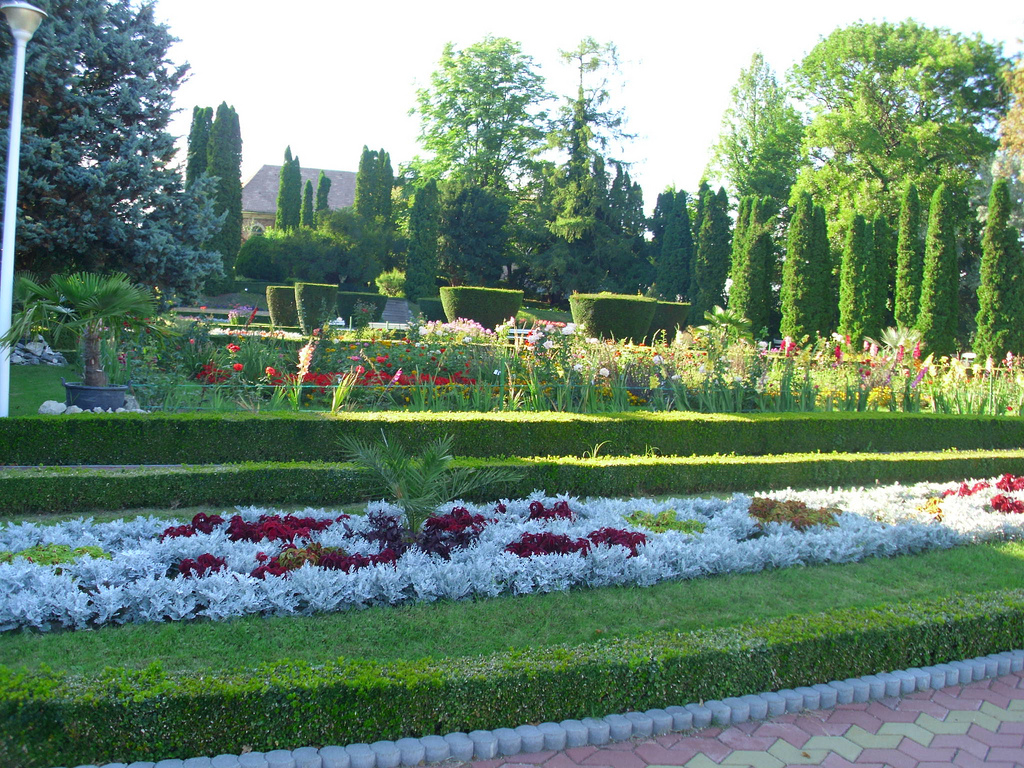

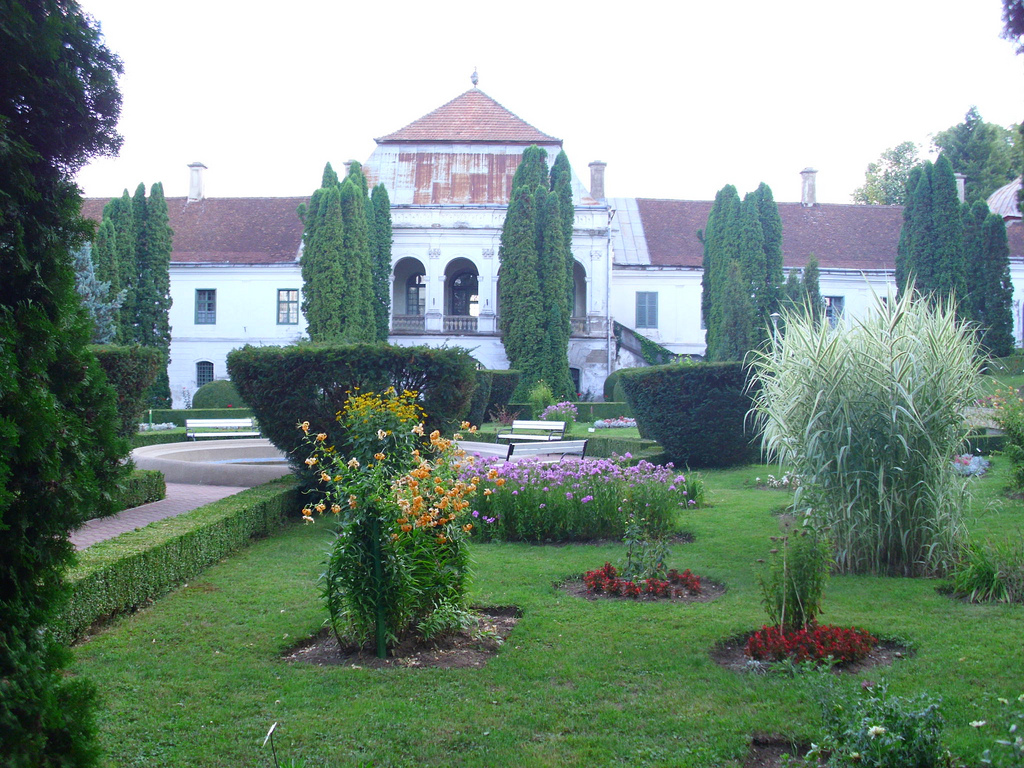

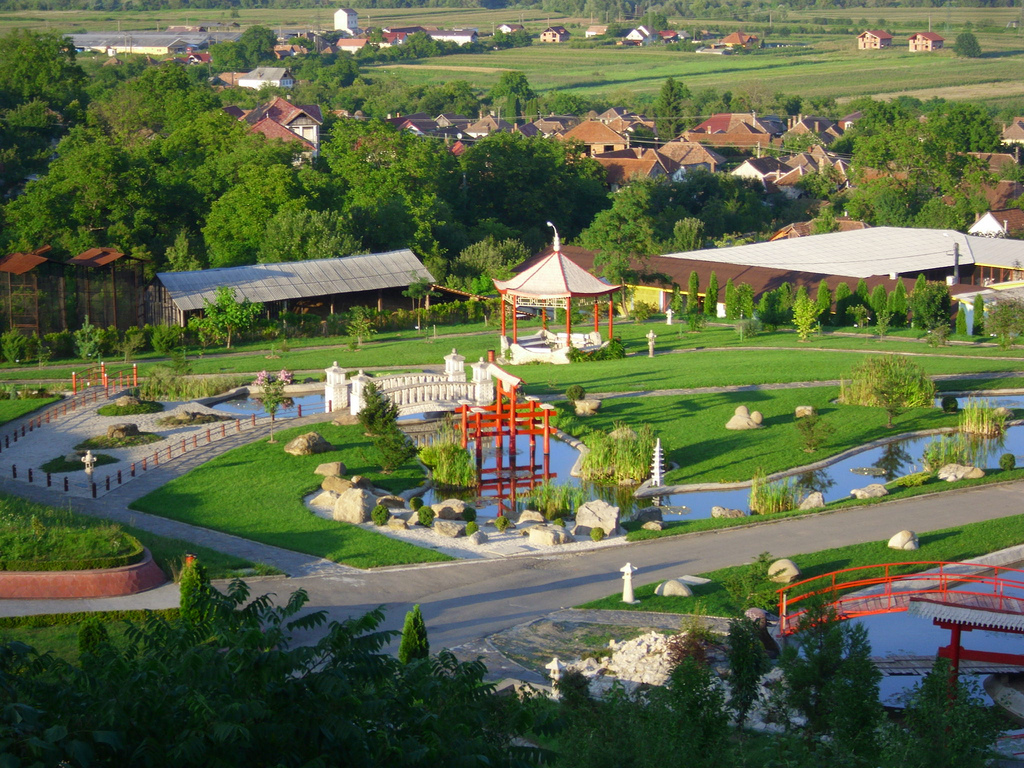

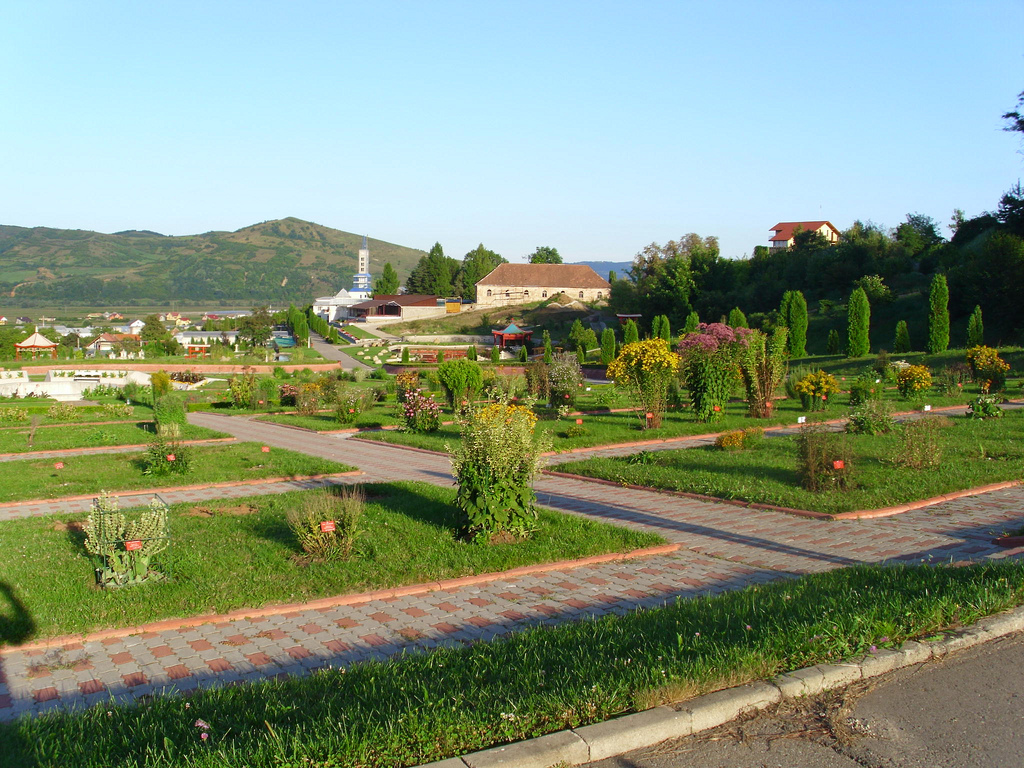

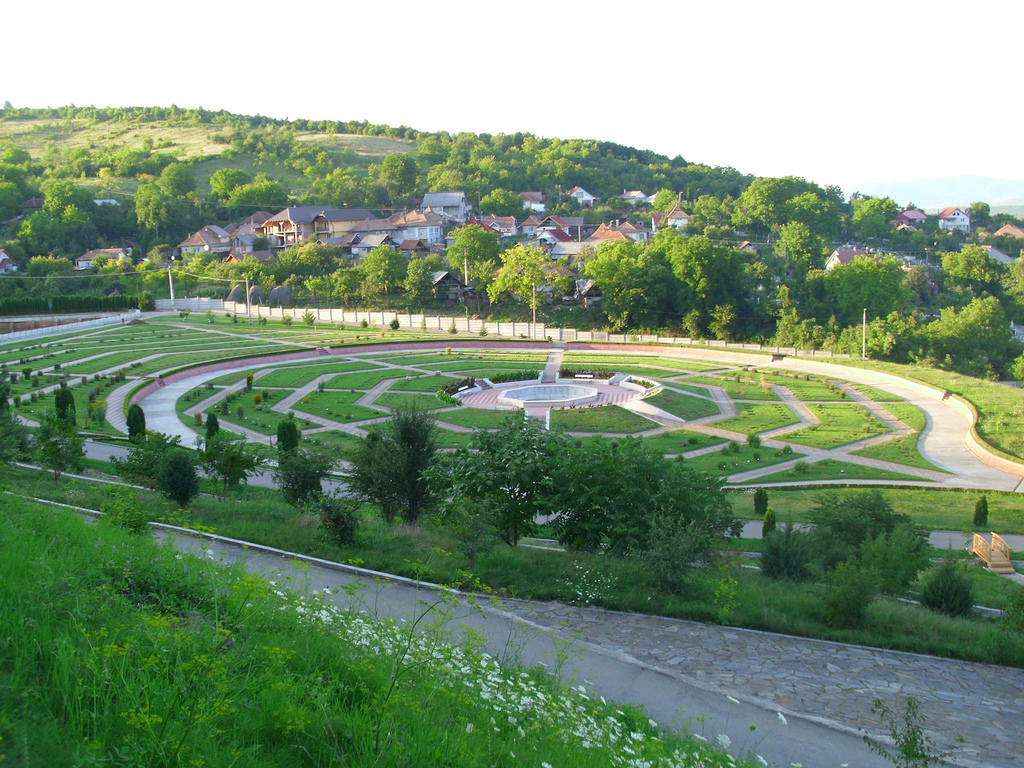

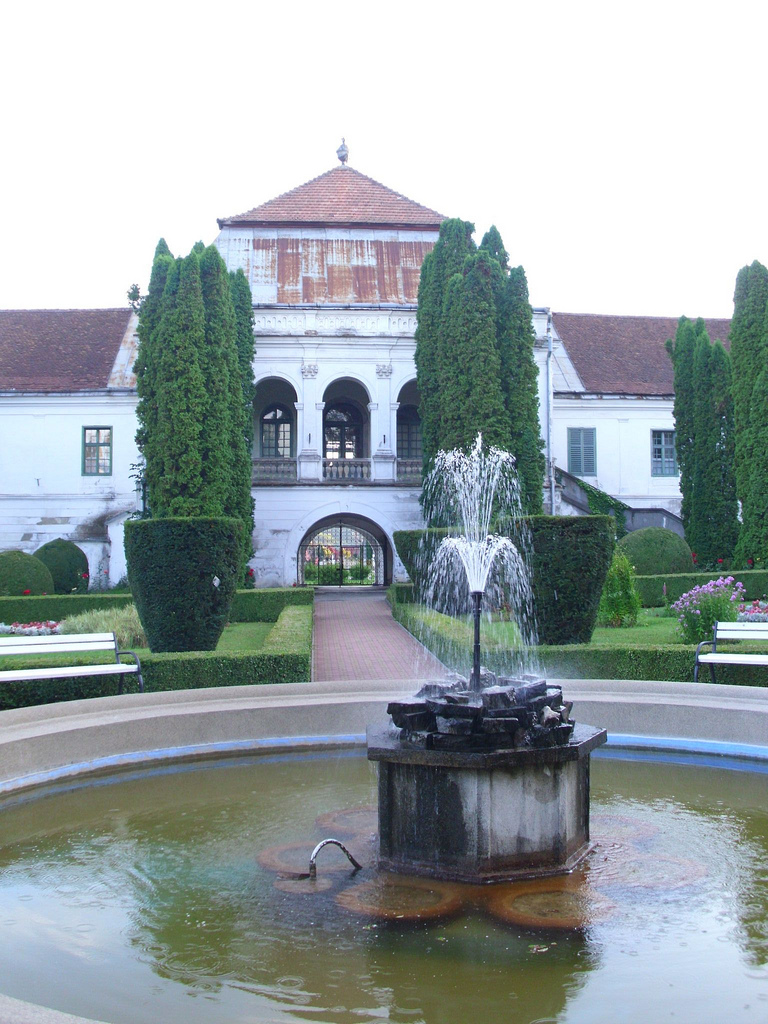

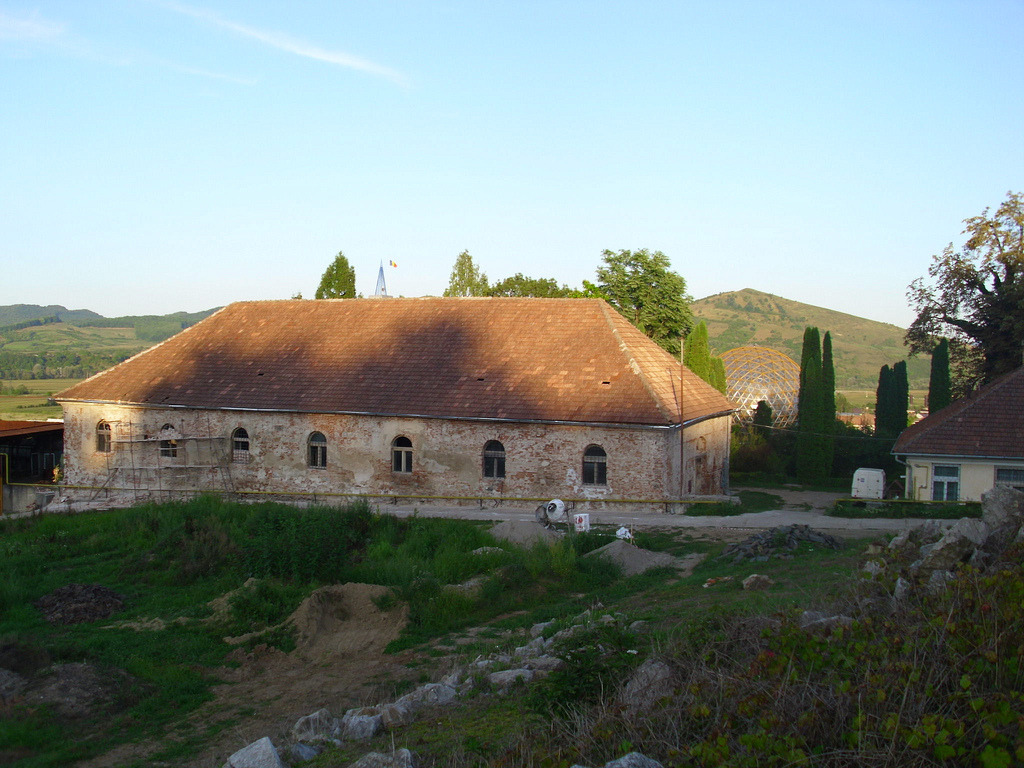

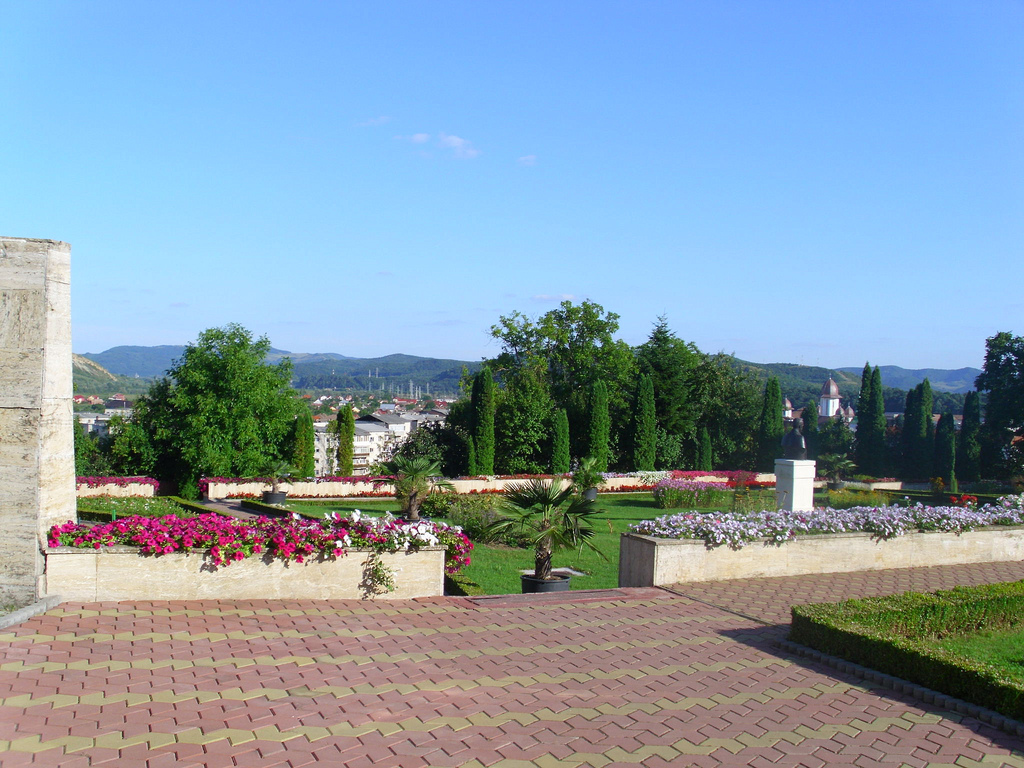

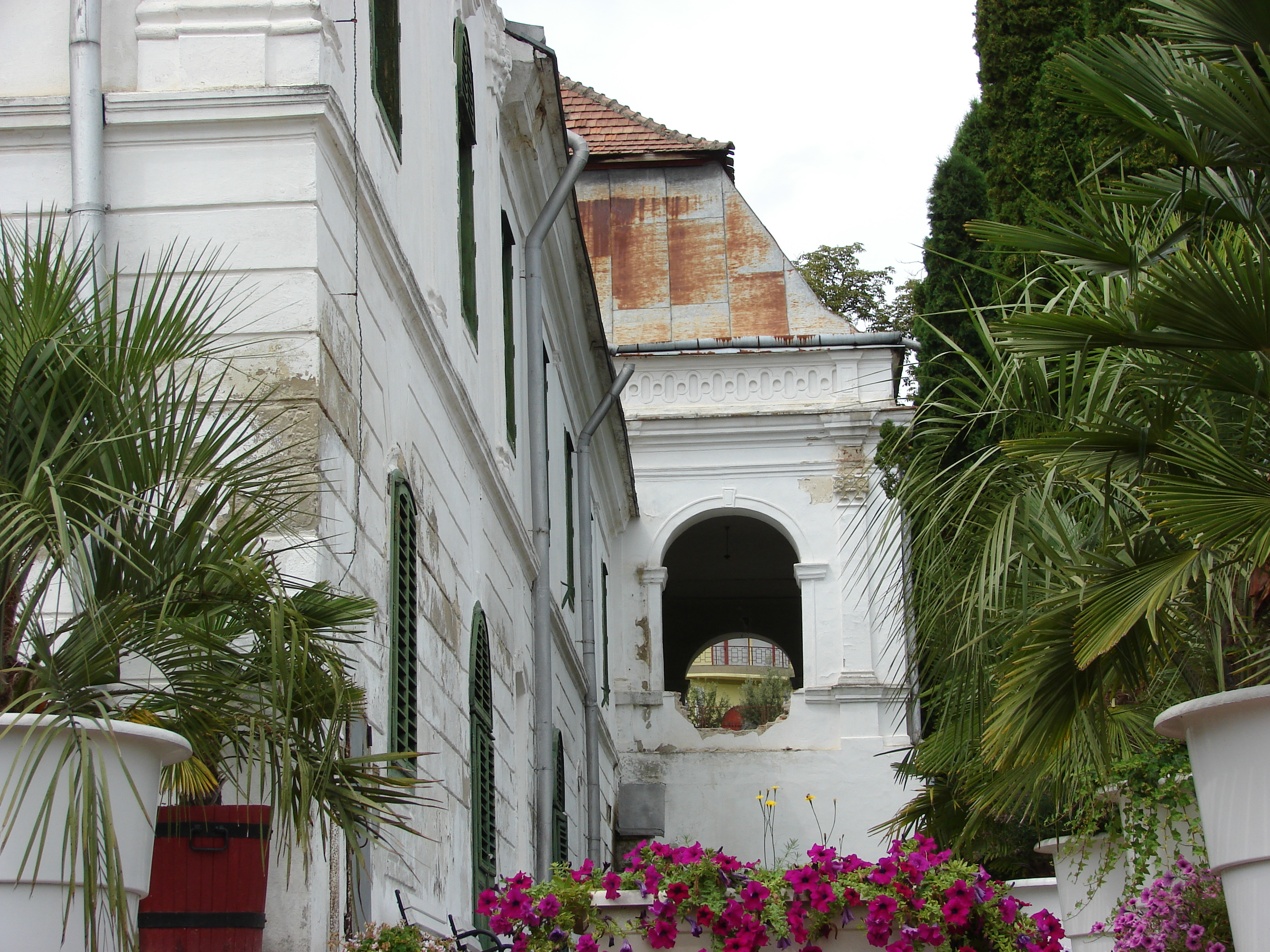

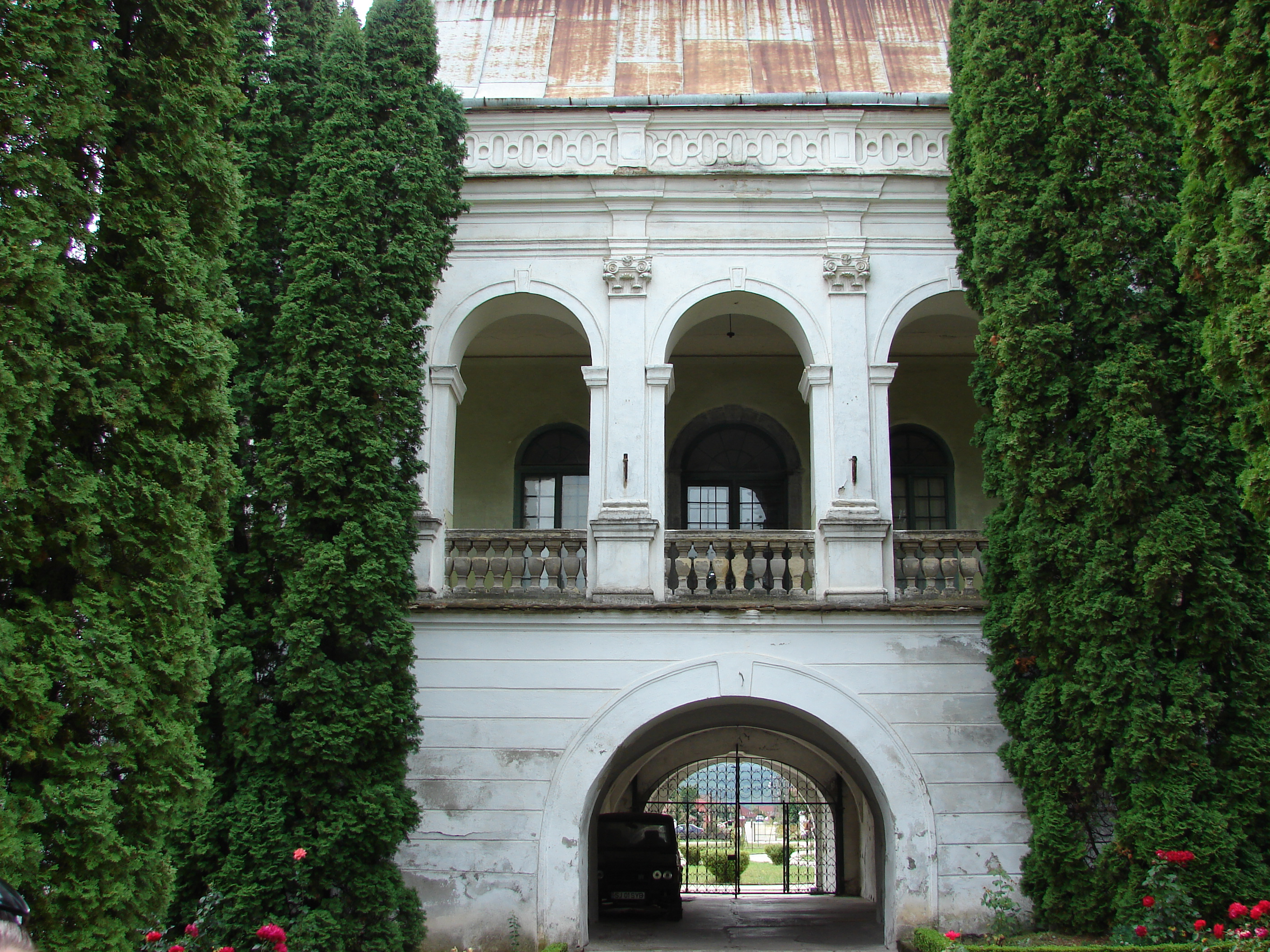

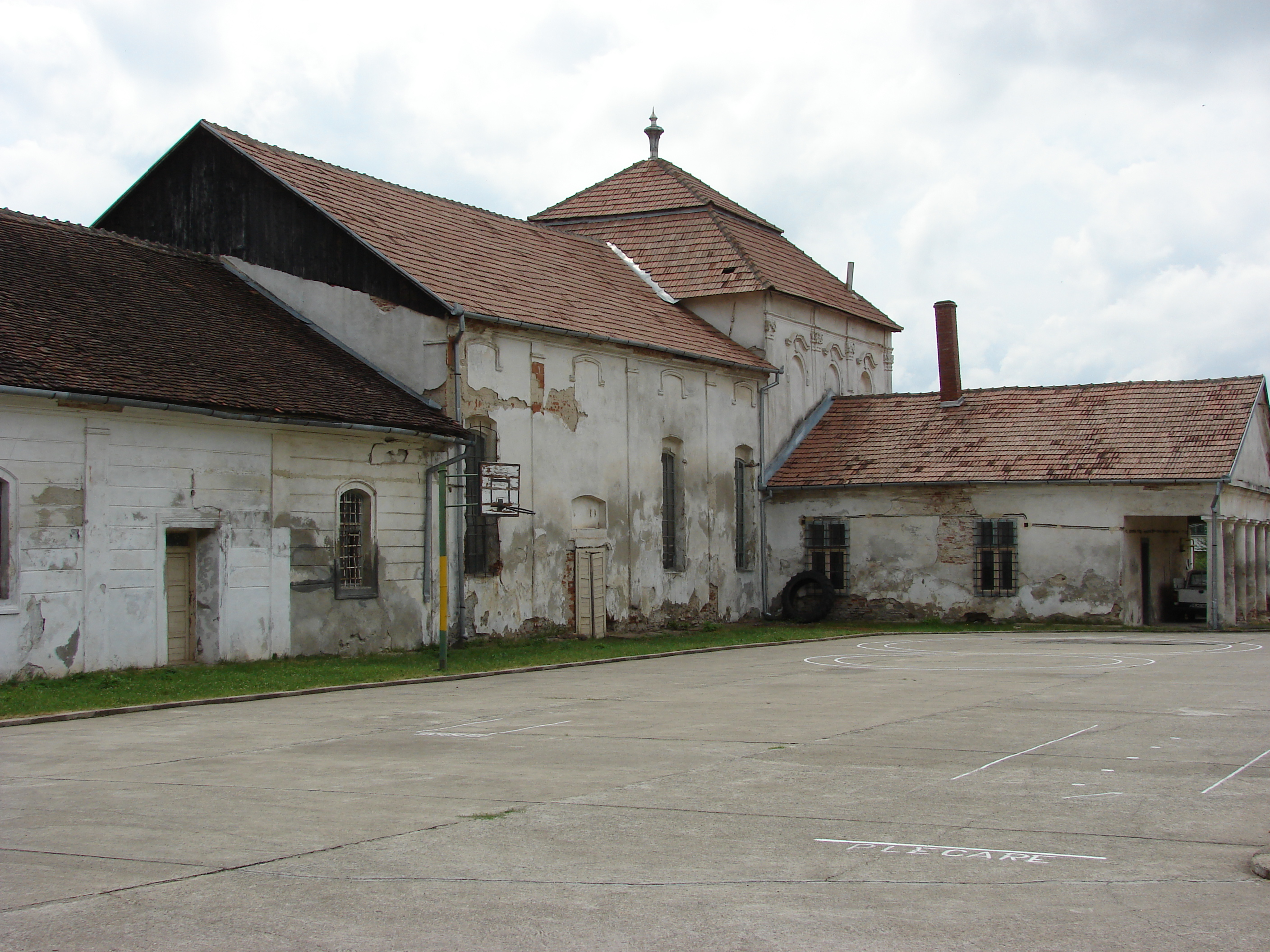

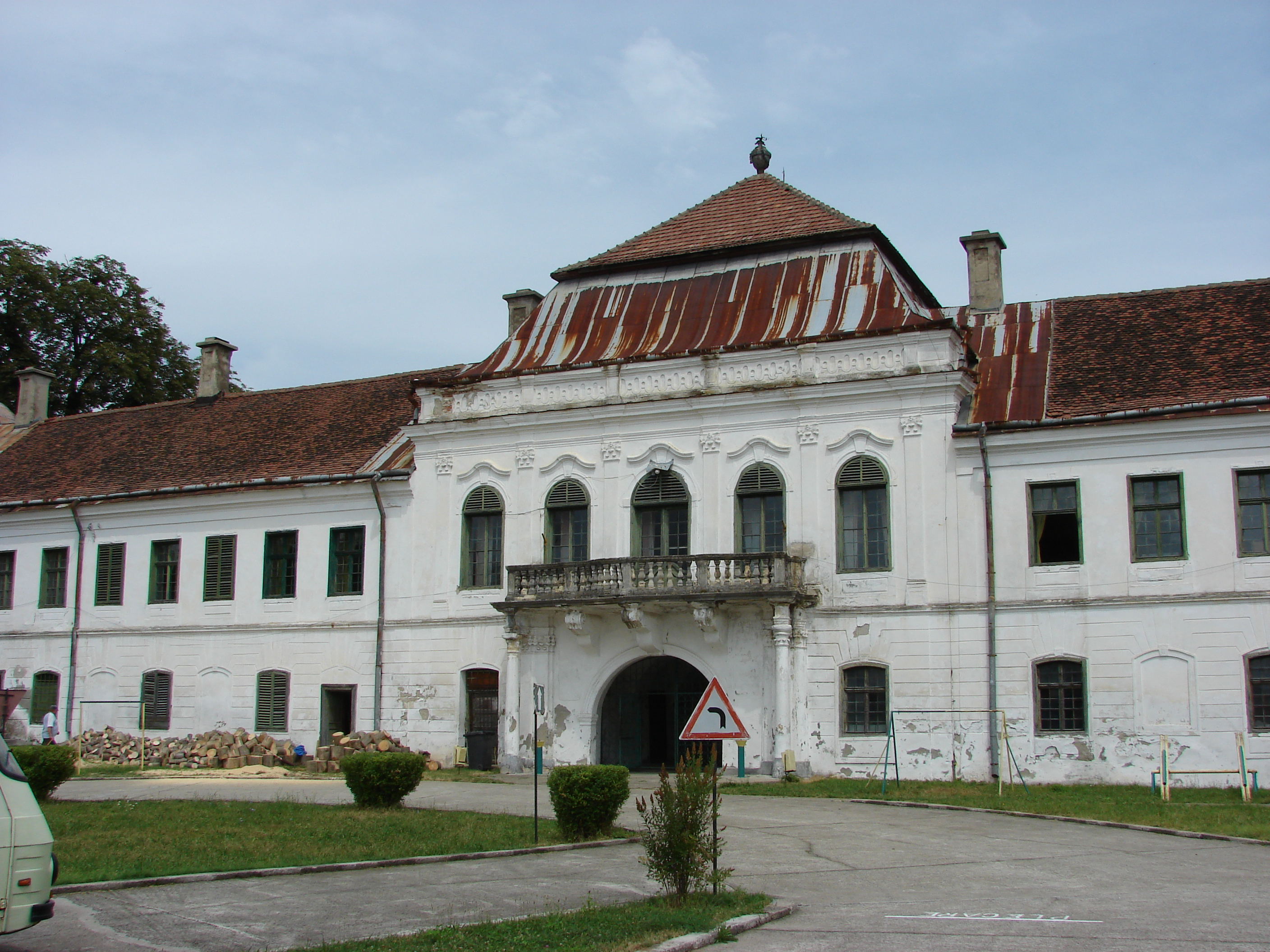

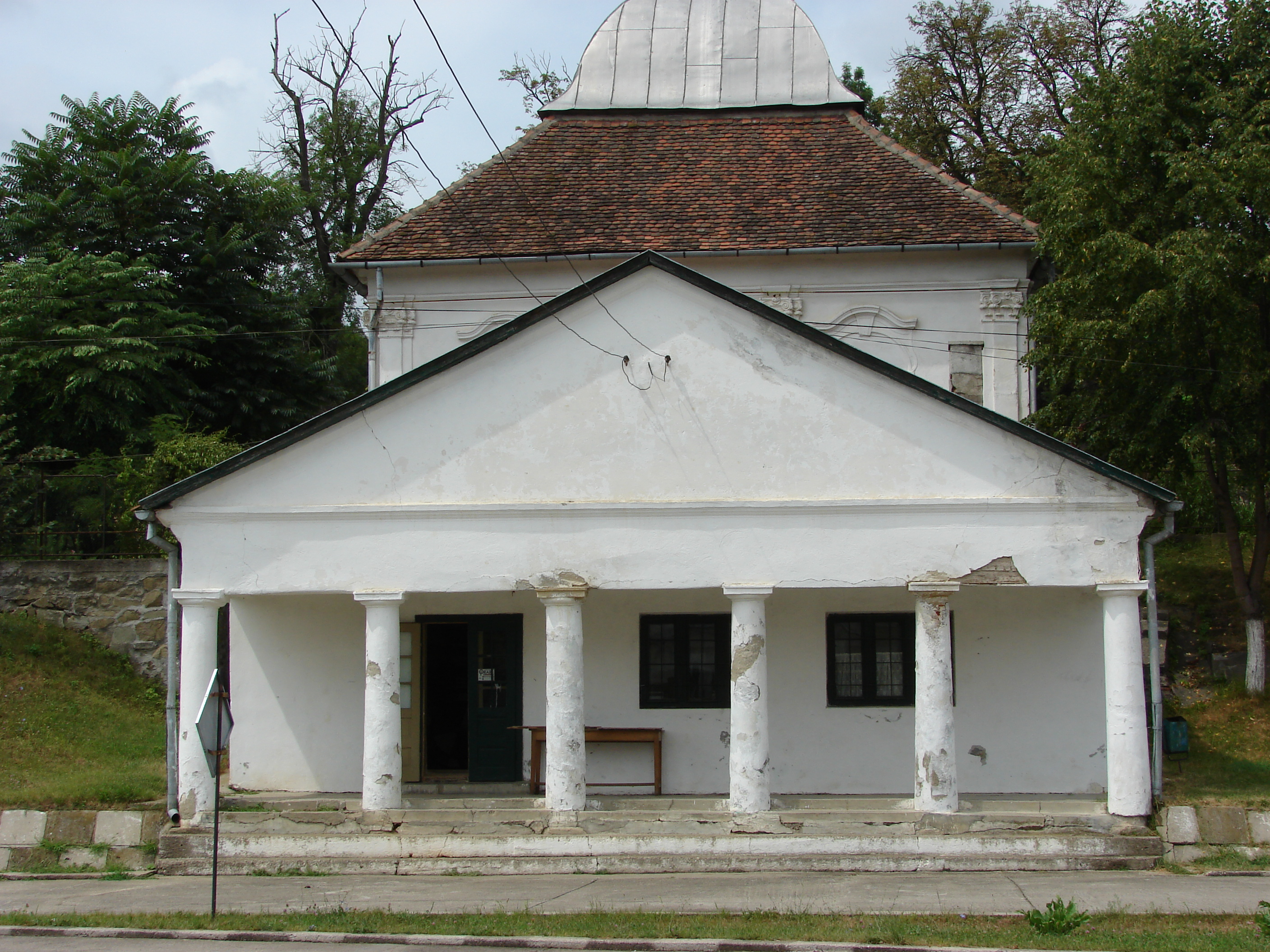

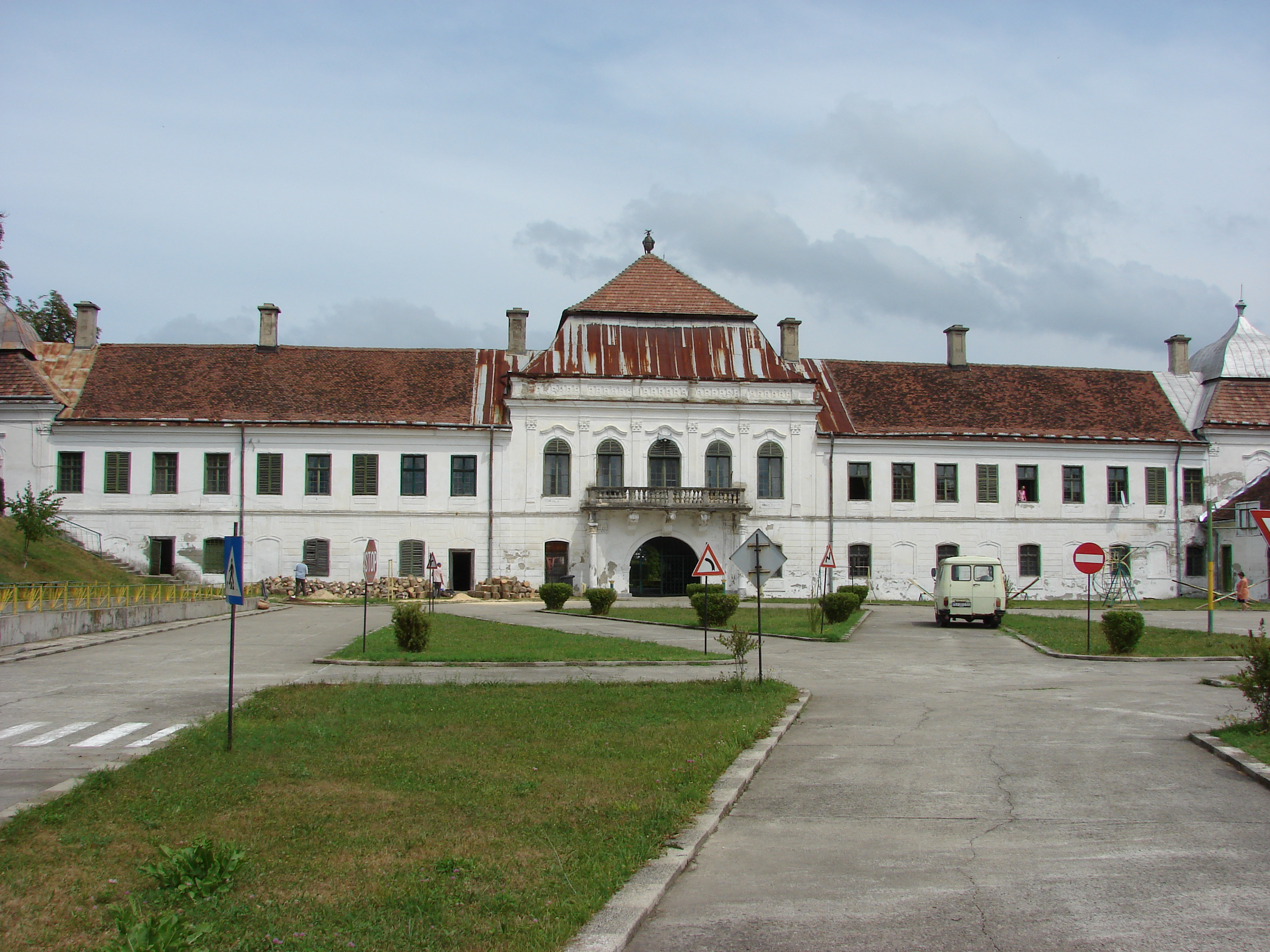

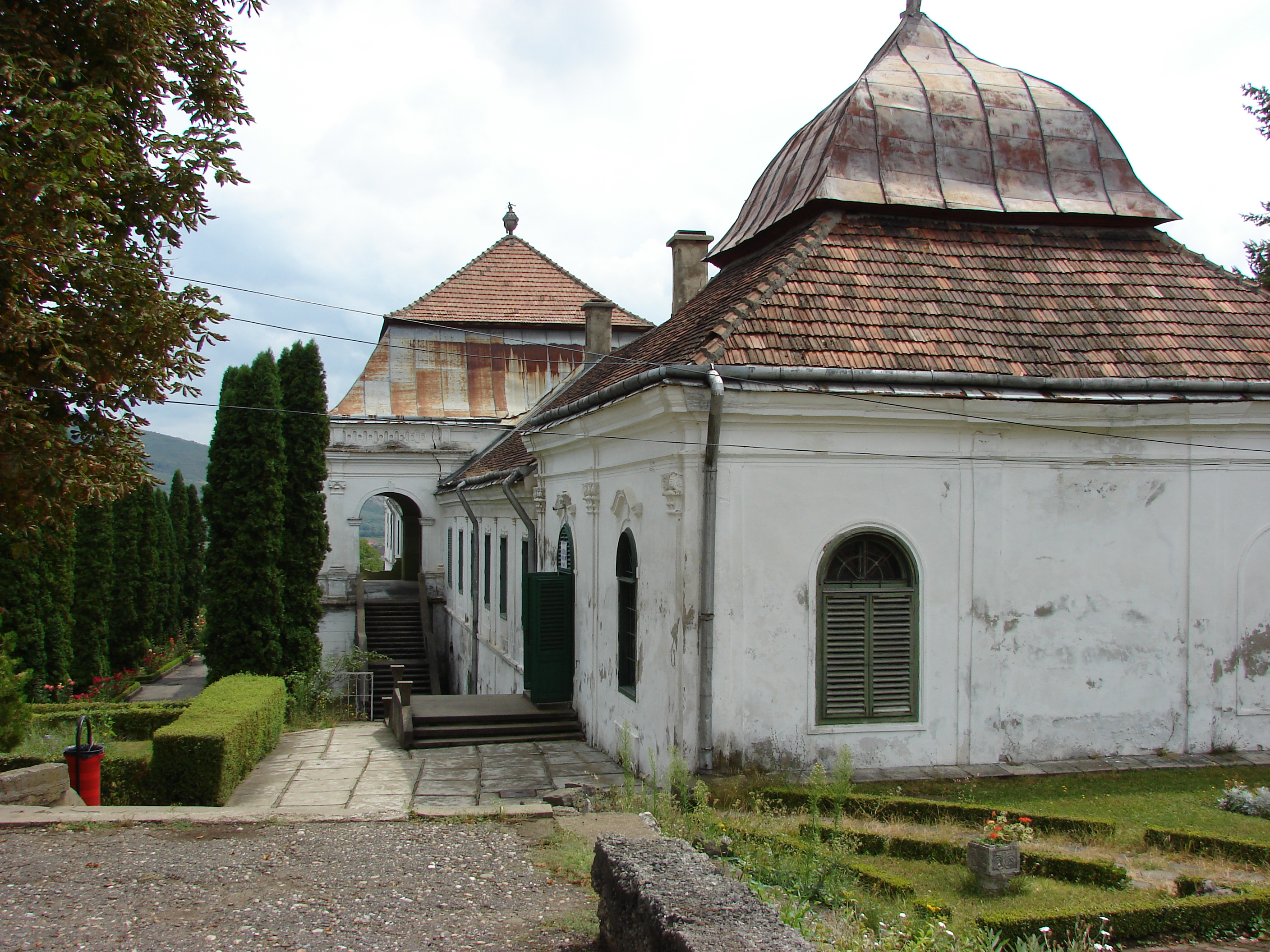

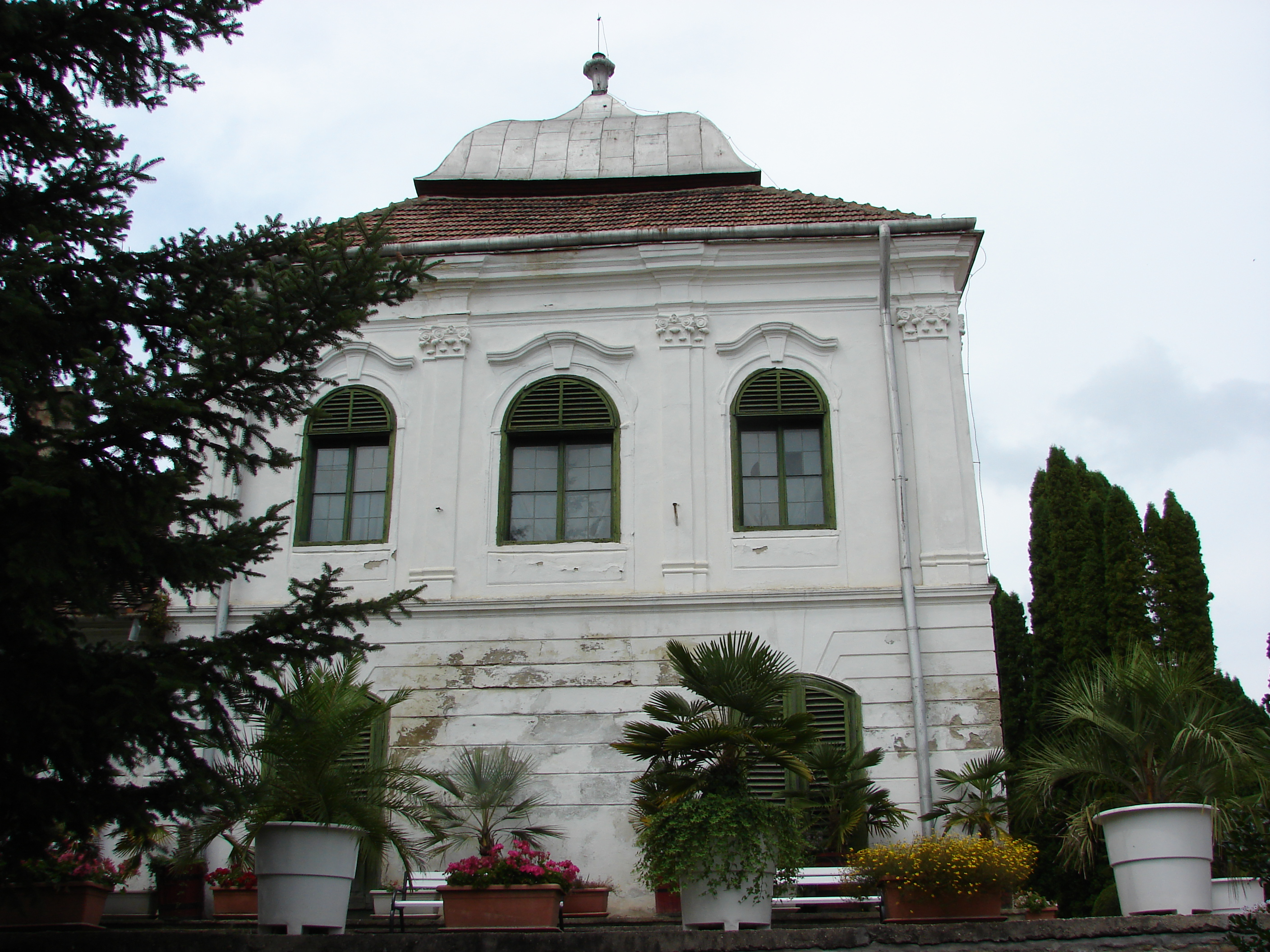
