= Husia =

Husia may refer to:

- Husia, a village administered by the town of Jibou, Romania
- Husia, an island in the Rotuma Group of Fiji
