= Battle of Zsibó =

1705 battle in Rákóczi's War of Independence

Battle of Zsibó/Jibou
- Part of the Rákóczi's War of Independence
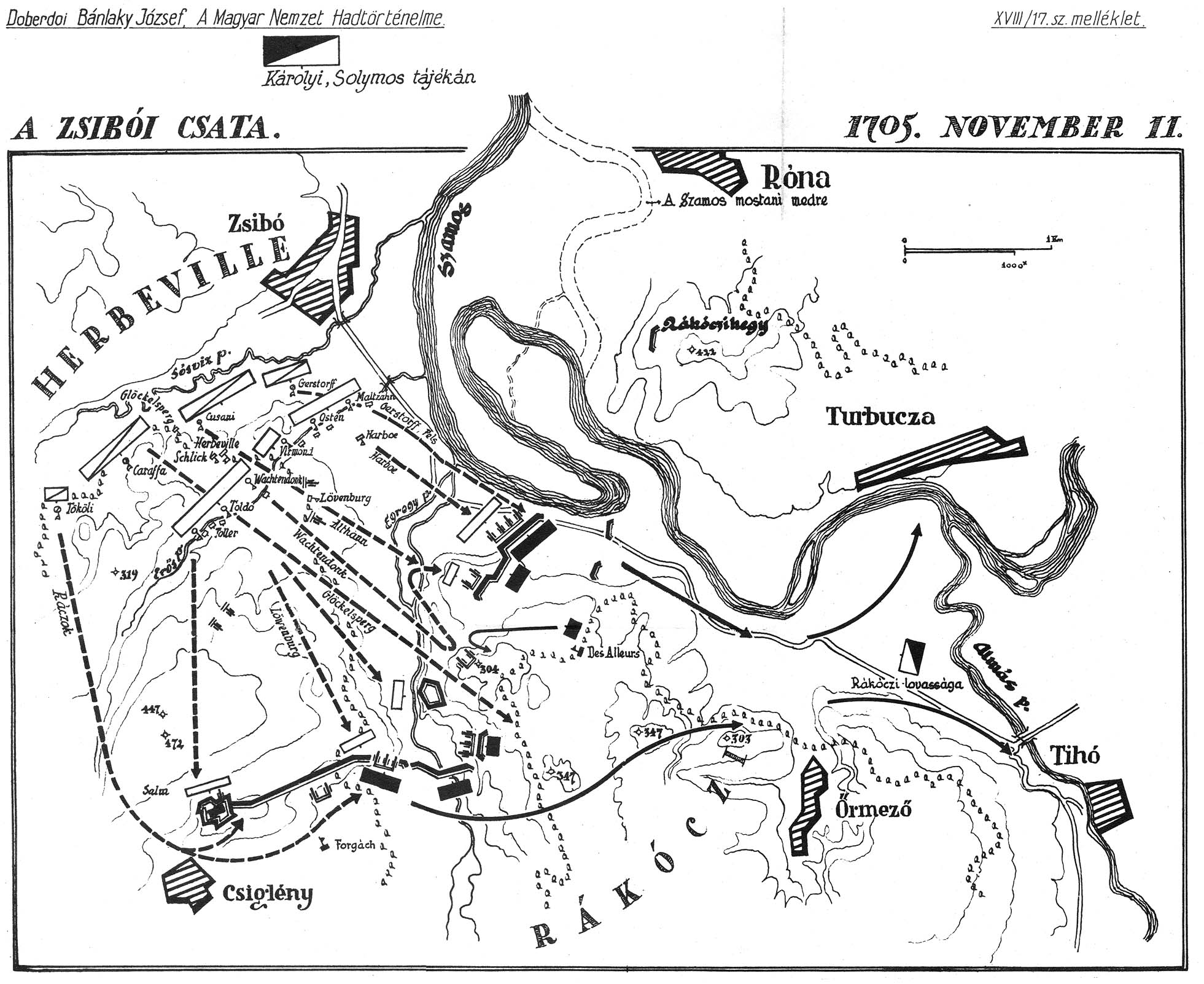
- Battle of Zsibó/Jibou
| Date | 15 November 1705 |
| Location | Zsibó, Transylvania (today: Jibou, Romania) |
| Result | Austrian-Danish-Serbian victory |

Belligerents
| Kurucs (Kingdom of Hungary); Kingdom of France | Habsburg Empire; Denmark-Norway; Vojvodian Serbs |

Commanders and leaders
| Francis II Rákóczi; Sándor Károlyi (general); Simon Forgách (general); Pierre Puchot des Alleurs marquis | Ludwig Herbeville marshal Friedrich von Löwenburg (general); Andreas Harboe (general); Frederik Gersdorff (general); Jovan Popović Tekelija |

Strength
| 15,000, 34 cannons | 16,500 |

Casualties and losses
| 400 deaths and 25 cannons | 450 deaths |

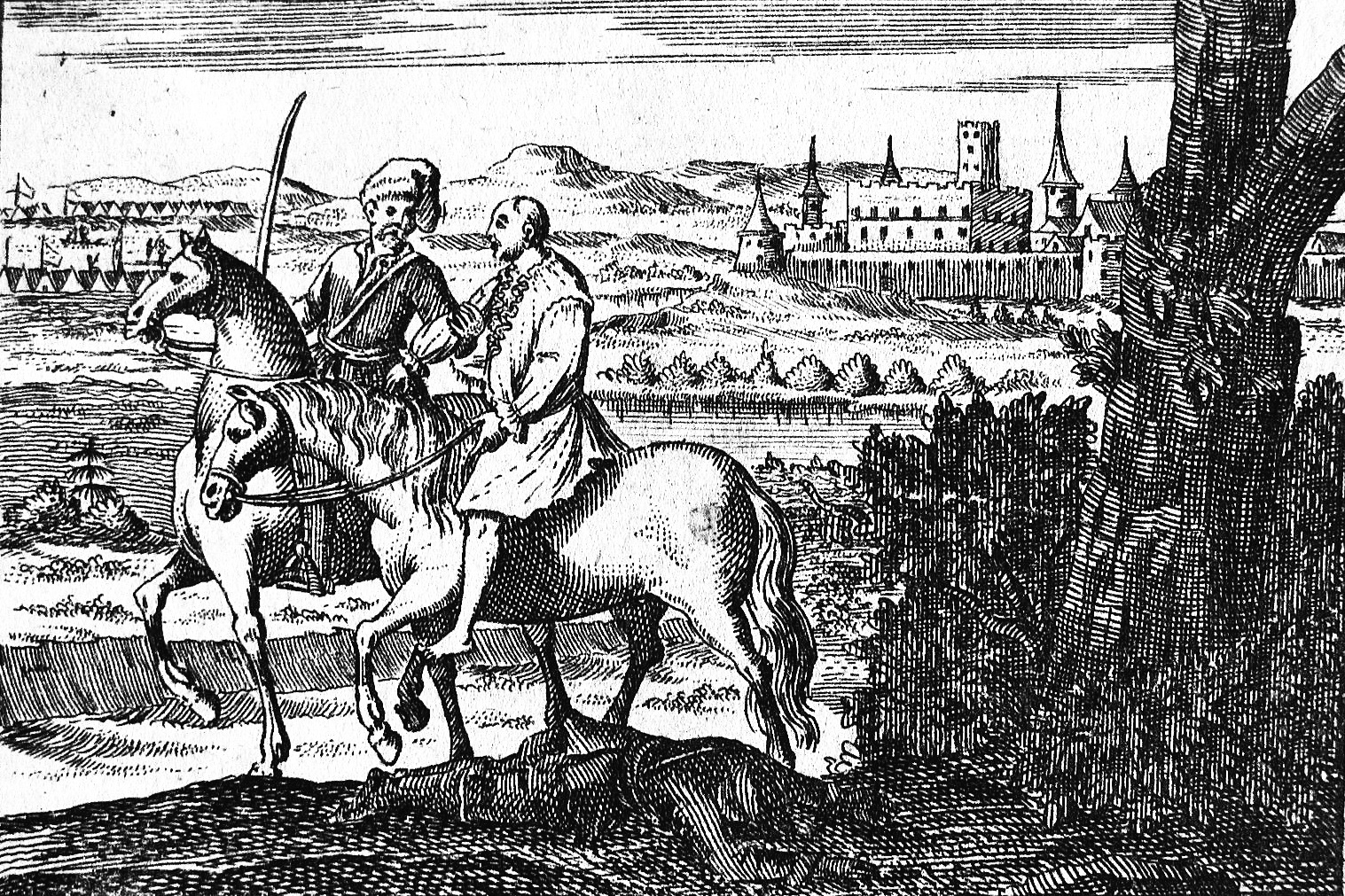
Capturing of the marquis de Bellegarde

Battle of Zsibó (Hungarian: Zsibói csata, German: Schlacht bei Siben, Romanian: Bătălia de la Jibou) was fought on 15 November 1705 between the Kuruc (Hungarian) army (supported by French contingents) and forces of the Habsburg Empire, Denmark-Norway and Vojvodian Serbs in Zsibó, Principality of Transylvania (today: Jibou, Romania). The Austrian marshal Ludwig Herbeville marched against Transylvania. Although the Kuruc-French army was equal in size to the combined Austrian, Danish and Serbian forces, Francis II Rákóczi went on the defense due to the inferior training of his troops. The Danes and Austrians launched a powerful attack on the French and Kuruc infantry. Although the Kuruc infantry held its ground, the Kuruc cavalry could not launch an attack due to a lack of leadership and an overly muddy battlefield. The Austrian cavalry was thus capable of flanking the Hungarians on the left, forcing the Hungarians to retreat and crushing their cavalry in the process. After the battle, the combined Austrian-Danish army bought Transylvania.

== Preparations ==
A 1704 campaign by Kuruc forces liberated much of Hungary from Austrian rule and established numerical parity with the Austrians. However, due to better training, a stronger officer corps and deeper logistical capabilities, the Austrians still won the decisive Battle of Nagyszombat, going on to take back the important fortresses of (Buda, Pressburg and Esztergom). The Austrians subsequently called on aid from Croatian, Serbian and Danish armies.

As a means of counterbalancing Austrian power, Louis XIV of France attempted to support the Kuruc rebels, sending troops and material support. However, following the French defeat at the battle of Höchstädt, Louis was forced to reduce his material contributions to Rákóczi and the Kurucs.

On 8 July 1704 the Transylvanian noble Rákóczi was elected Transylvanian prince, and on 4 April 1705 he was inducted. Designed to declare the confederation of Hungary and Transylvania, problems nonetheless occurred in the National Assembly of Szécsény over the army and the legal status of serfdom. Meanwhile, Rákóczi routed the new Habsburg army under Vienna.

On 27 June a Danish military detachment arrived in Vienna (4500 infantry and 1600 cavalry) under Andreas Harboe. The Danish soldiers fought against the French army in the battle of Höchstädt. The Danish-Austrian vanguard under col. Dietrich Glöckelsperg attacked Great Rye Island. Baron Herbeville mobilized his army on the island and on July 29 tried to march in Komárno, but withdrew on 3 August because of the Kuruc attacks. Meanwhile, Miklós Bercsényi and Antal Esterházy invaded Moravia. On 25 August Herbeville crossed Transdanubia. In September he took a rest in Buda. The army of János Bottyán (6000 men) tried to disturb the Austrian army.

The Kuruc commanders committed serious errors: only in October did they respond to the attack of Herbeville. Rákóczi reinforced fortifications built near Zsibó, but wanted to fight a battle near Nagyvárad (today: Oradea, Romania). Later, the decision was changed to bring the battle to Zsibó. On 31 October Herbeville chased the Kuruc army from Nagyvárad, which had been besieged for two years. This was a serious defeat for the Kuruc army.

== Opposing forces ==
Rákóczi's army was well equipped with food and the soldiers were relaxed. However many of the Kuruc soldiers were poorly trained. The French auxiliary troops of Marquis Des Alleurs, Rákóczi's court regiments (Hungarian, Rusyn and German soldiers) and the German mercenaries of Simon Forgách were trained and disciplined soldiers. Many Romanian soldiers served in the infantry and cavalry, which included a miscellaneous Hungarian-Romanian-Serbian mounted regiment. The combined forces of the Kuruc-French army numbered 15,000 men and 34 cannons. The Kuruc army was located in the trenches near Zsibó, but the trenches were not completely prepared.

Herbeville's army was starving, as Bottyán had used scorched-earth tactics against the Austrians and all the crops on Great Rye Island had been harvested. Nevertheless, the fighting morale of the army remained high. All military units were trained, equipped and disciplined, except for the irregular Serbian cavalry. Danish grenadiers, infantry and cavalry fought under Andreas Harboe and general Frederik Gersdorff. Jovan Popović vojvoda of Tököl commanded the Serbian light cavalry. The Austrian-Danish-Serbian army numbered 16,500 men.

== Literature ==
- Magyarország története 1526–1686, Főszerk.: Pach Zsigmond; szerk.: R. Várkonyi Ágnes, Akadémiai Kiadó, Budapest 1985. ISBN 963-05-4098-3
