= Miklós Wesselényi =

Hungarian politician (1796–1850)

Baron Miklós Wesselényi de Hadad
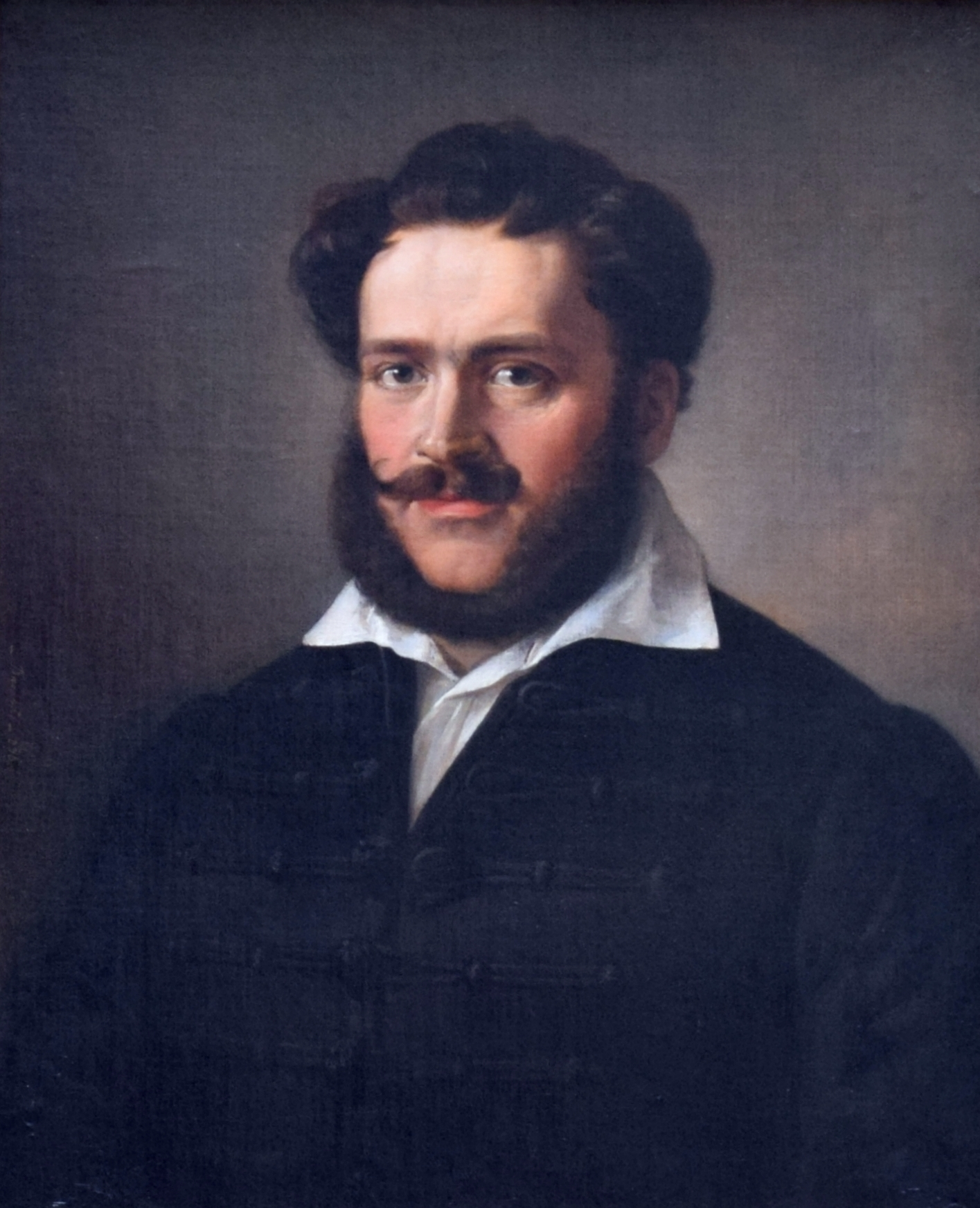
- Wesselényi in the painting of Miklós Barabás (1836)
- Born: Miklós Wesselényi; 20 December 1796; Zsibó, Kingdom of Hungary (today Jibou, Romania)
- Died: 2 April 1850 (aged 53) on the way returning to Hungary from Gräfenberg
- Resting place: Budapest
- Citizenship: Hungary
- Known for: His political activity
- Parent(s): Ilona Cserei and Miklós Wesselényi

Baron Miklós Wesselényi de Hadad (Hungarian pronunciation: [ˈmikloːʃ ˈvɛʃɛleːɲi]; archaically English: Nicholas Wesselényi; 20 December 1796 – 21 April 1850) was a Hungarian statesman, leader of the upper house of the Diet, member of the Board of Academy of Sciences, hero of the 1838 Pest flood. A prominent and wealthy Hungarian aristocrat, son of Baron Miklós Wesselényi and Ilona Cserei, he was born at Zsibó (now Jibou), and was educated at his father's castle by Mózes Pataky in a liberal and patriotic direction. He inherited his father's physical strength, and he further trained himself in different sports, such as horse-riding and swimming. He was a celebrity in his age for his sportsman's accomplishments.

== Early career ==
Wesselényi entered politics in 1818, taking minor positions at numerous County Diets, as was customary with the upper nobility his family belonged to. He went on a grand tour of Western Europe with his friend, Count István Széchenyi in 1821 and 1822. Realizing their native Hungary's need to catch up with the development of other European states, they become leading figures of the progressive opposition in the Upper House, promoting a program of reform and economic and national development. Hungary was under the foreign rule of the Habsburg emperors, who treated any native reform movement with deep suspicion. The Habsburg government, fearing unrest and independence efforts, took increasingly oppressive measures to curb the nationalist movement.

== Accomplishments ==
Wesselényi abolished several feudal laws and customs on his own estates, freed his serfs, built and ran schools on his own money, and organized lectures on modern agriculture for his former subjects. He established a printing press in Kolozsvár to promote his ideas.

In 1833 he published a political book titled Prejudices (Balítéletek), which was immediately banned by the Habsburg government.

In the Diet of 1834, he became one of the political leaders of the opposition. He held several speeches on current topics attacking feudal institutions, and printed and distributed the minutes of the Diet in order to give publicity to the debates. For these activities, the government took him to trial for inciting unrest, operating a printing press without royal permission, and also for one of his speeches, where he called for general land-redemption. His long-lasting trials (two at the same time) became a focal point of the country's political life and reform movement. His legal representative was Ferenc Kölcsey.

During the 1838 Pest Flood, he saved many lives by rowing about the flooded city and rescuing people from rooftops, gaining nationwide admiration.

== Prison ==
Finally his trials ended and he was sentenced to 3 years in prison. After serving 2 months in the casemates of the Buda castle, he started to have a serious eye ailment, and he was permitted to travel to Gräfenberg (now Lázně Jeseník) in Silesia with his family in order to cure his illness. He returned in 1843, almost completely blind and a wreck of his former self. He moved back to Zsibó, and served in minor positions within the local county government. Subsequently, he did much for agriculture, children's homes and the introduction and extension of the silk industry in Hungary.

== Last years ==
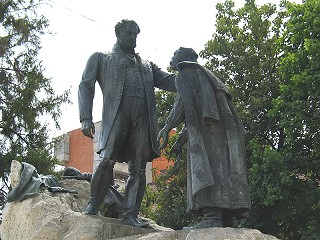
Wesselényi Monument, built 1902 in Zalău by János Fadrusz

Seriously ill, he still took part in the initial stages of the Hungarian Revolution of 1848, and had a key role in persuading the Transylvanian Diet to proclaim union with Hungary, one of the important goals of the Revolution. Seeing the development and radicalization of the events, similar to his friend, Count Széchenyi, and also many from the reform-minded aristocracy, he also became disillusioned. In September 1848 he left the country under the pretext of continuing his medical treatment in Gräfenberg. He stayed there, accompanied by his wife, Anna Lux, who faithfully supported and tended him through his illness.

Wesselényi died in 1850, while returning to Hungary from Gräfenberg.

Among his other accomplishments, he is remembered for his support of the development of Hungarian agriculture, the introduction and extension of the silk industry, and his support for children's homes and child care. He was elected to the Board of the Hungarian Academy of Sciences in 1830, and in 1831 he received honorary membership of the institution.

From 1902, a statue of Wesselényi by artist János Fadrusz has stood in the center of Zalău.
