= Religion in Romania =

Religious affiliation in Romania according to the partial 2021 census results, given as percentages of the total stable population.
1. Romanian Orthodoxy (73.4%)
2. Other Orthodoxies (0.44%)
3. Protestantism (6.22%)
4. Latin Catholicism (3.90%)
5. Eastern Catholicism (0.60%)
6. Atheists (0.30%)
7. Agnostics (0.13%)
8. Other not religious (0.37%)
9. Islam (0.30%)
10. Judaism (0.02%)
11. Other religions (0.36%)
12. Unknown (refused to answer) (13.9%)

Cathedral of the Three Holy Hierarchs in Timișoara.

Christianity is the main religion in Romania, with Romanian Orthodoxy being its largest denomination.

Romania is a secular state and freedom of religion is enshrined in the nation's constitution.

== Overview ==
Romania is one of the most religious European countries and the majority of the country's citizens are Orthodox Christians. Romania is a secular state, and it has no state religion. Despite being one of the most religious countries, practice, church and mass attendance are low, even compared to less religious countries than Romania.

The Romanian state officially recognizes 18 religions and denominations. 86.53% of the country's stable population identified as part of the Eastern Orthodox Church in the 2011 census (see also: History of Christianity in Romania). Other major Christian denominations include the Catholic Church (both Latin Catholicism (4.62%) and Greek Catholicism (0.8%–3.3%)), Calvinism (3.19%), and Pentecostal denominations (1.92%). This amounts to approximately 99% of the population identifying as Christian. Romania also has a small but historically significant Muslim minority of around 44,000 people, concentrated in Northern Dobruja, who are mostly of Crimean Tatar and Turkish ethnicity. According to the 2011 census data, there are also approximately 3,500 Jews, around 21,000 atheists and about 19,000 people not identifying with any religion. The 2011 census numbers are based on a stable population of 20,121,641 people and exclude a portion of about 6% due to unavailable data.

According to the 2022 census, 76,215 people, approximately 0.4% of the total population, indicated that their religion was Islam.

== Christianity ==
=== Eastern Orthodoxy ===
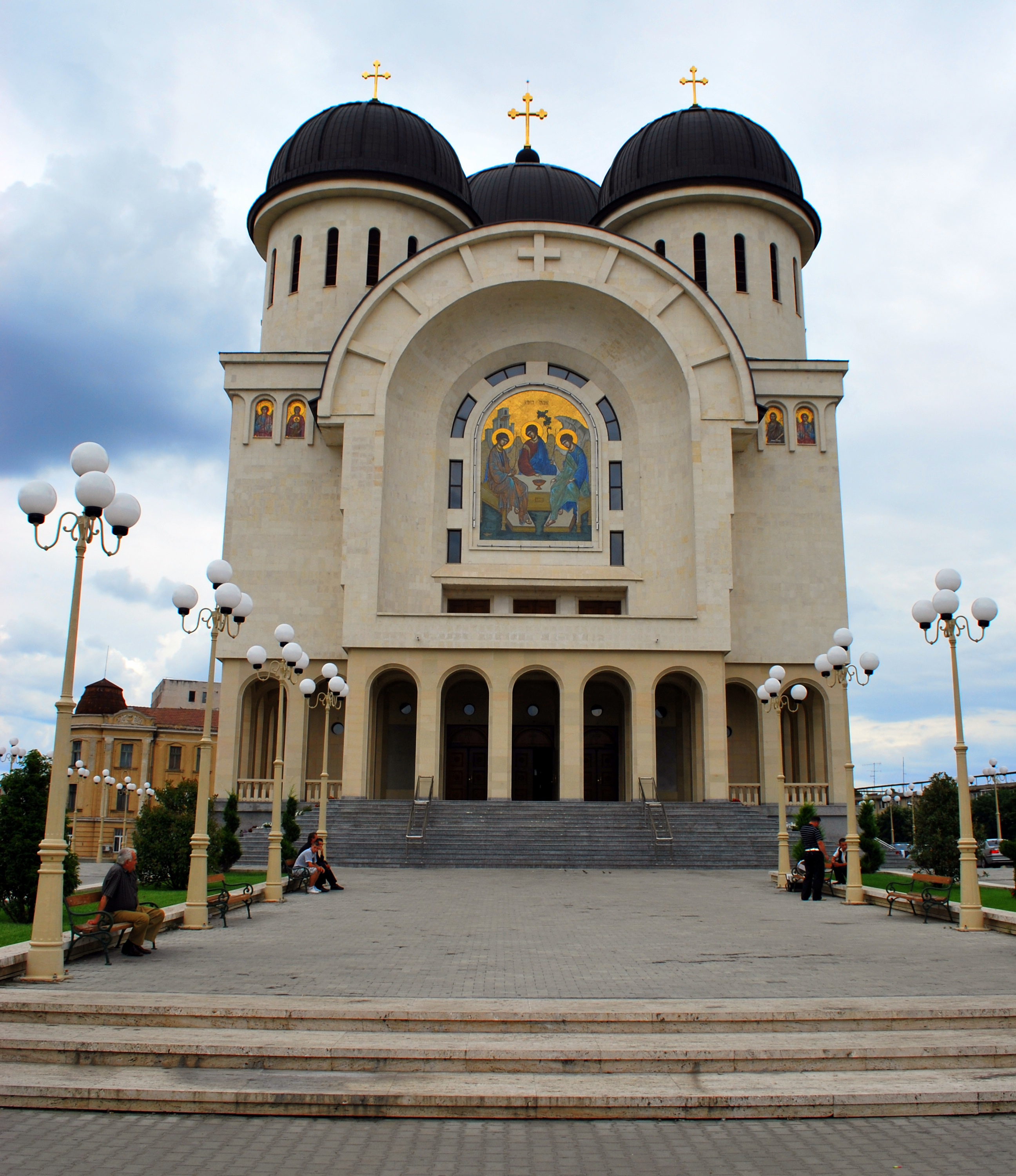
The Holy Trinity Romanian Orthodox Cathedral in Arad

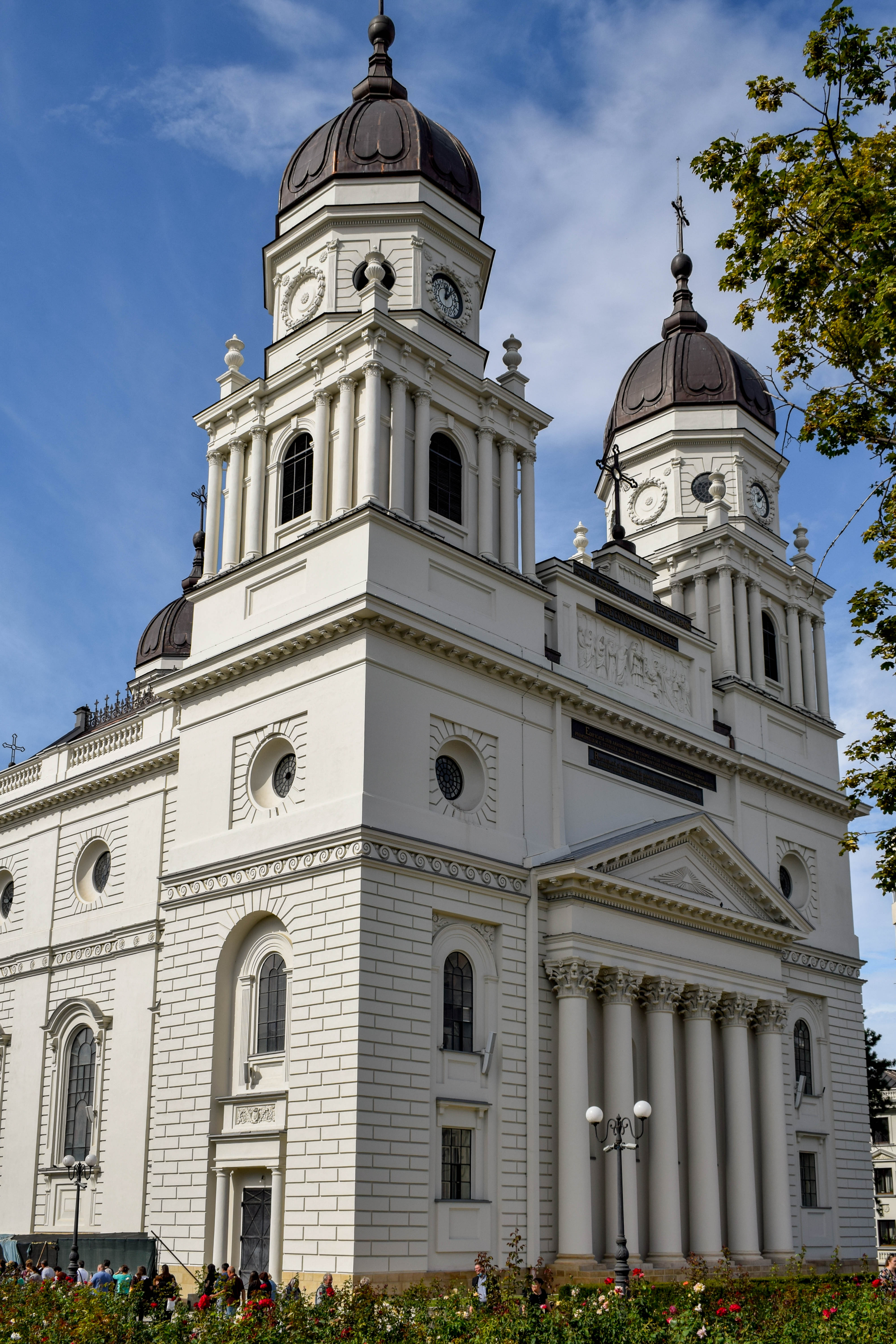
Metropolitan Cathedral in Iași, the largest Orthodox church in Romania

The Eastern Orthodox Church is the largest religious denomination in Romania, numbering 16,307,004 according to the 2011 census, or 81.04% of the population. The rate of church attendance is, however, significantly lower. According to a poll conducted by INSCOP in July 2015, 37.8% of Romanians who declare themselves to be religious go to church only on major holidays, 25.4% once a week (especially on Sunday), 18.9% once a month, 10.2% once a year or less, 3.4% say they do not go to church, 2.7% a few times a week, and only 0.9% say they go to church daily.

Apart from the mainstream Eastern Orthodox Church, other eastern orthodox groups exist in the country among which is the True Orthodox denomination Old Calendar Orthodox Church of Romania and the Old Believers of the Lipovan Orthodox Old-Rite Church.

The 2021 census recorded a decrease in the number of Orthodox inhabitants of Romania, of 2.3 million.

=== Latin Church of the Catholic Church ===
According to the 2011 census, there are 870,774 Catholics belonging to the Latin Church in Romania, making up 4.33% of the population. The largest ethnic groups are Hungarians (500,444, including Székelys; 41% of the Hungarians), Romanians (297,246 or 1.8%), Germans (21,324 or 59%), and Roma (20,821 or 3.3%), as well as a majority of the country's Slovaks, Bulgarians, Croats, Italians, Czechs, Poles, and Csangos (27,296 in all).

=== Romanian Greek Catholic Church ===
According to the 2011 census, there are 150,593 Romanian Greek Catholics in Romania, making up 0.75% of the population. The majority of Greek Catholics live in the northern part of Transylvania. Most are Romanians (124,563), with the remainder mostly Hungarians or Roma.

On the other hand, according to data published in the 2016 Annuario Pontificio, the Romanian Greek-Catholic Church had 504,280 members, 8 bishops, 1,225 parishes, some 835 diocesan priests and 235 seminarians of its own rite at the end of 2012. However, according to the 2011 Romanian government census, the number of its followers living in Romania was as low as 150,593, of which 124,563 are ethnic Romanians. In 2022, the church estimated their numbers at 488,000, noting that many citizens whose ancestors were forced to covert during the Communist regime had rediscovered their roots and joined the Greek Catholic Church.

The Romanian Orthodox Church continues to claim many of the Romanian Greek Catholic Church's properties. The law provides for the restitution of religious properties confiscated between 1940 and 1989, if they are still owned by the state; however restitution is moving slowly.

=== Protestantism ===
Protestant subgroups in Romania in 2022
1. Evangelicals (46.6%)
2. Magisterial Protestants (43.8%)
3. Restorationists (5.57%)
4. Radical Protestants (4.05%)
Specific Protestant traditions in Romania in 2022
1. Calvinists (41.8%)
2. Pentecostals (34.1%)
3. Baptists (8.70%)
4. Adventists (5.55%)
5. Unitarians (4.05%)
6. Brethren (3.75%)
7. Lutherans (2.00%)
8. Other (0.04%)

According to the 2021 census, Protestants make up about 6% of the total population. They have historically been made up of Magisterial Protestants (Lutherans and Calvinists) and Radicals (Unitarians), although in recent years Evangelical Protestants and various Restorationist groups such as Adventists and New Apostolics have spread and now hold a greater share.

In 1930, prior to World War II, Protestants constituted approximately 8.8% of the Romanian population. The largest denominations are the Reformed Church in Romania and the Pentecostal Union of Romania. Of these various Protestant groups, Hungarians account for most of the Reformed, Unitarians, and Evangelical Lutherans; Romanians are the majority of the Pentecostals, Baptists, Seventh-day Adventists and Evangelical Christians; while Germans account for most of the Augustan Confession Evangelicals (i.e. Lutherans historically subscribing to the Augsburg Confession). The majority of Calvinists (Reformed Church) and Unitarians have services only in Hungarian.

==== Lutheranism ====
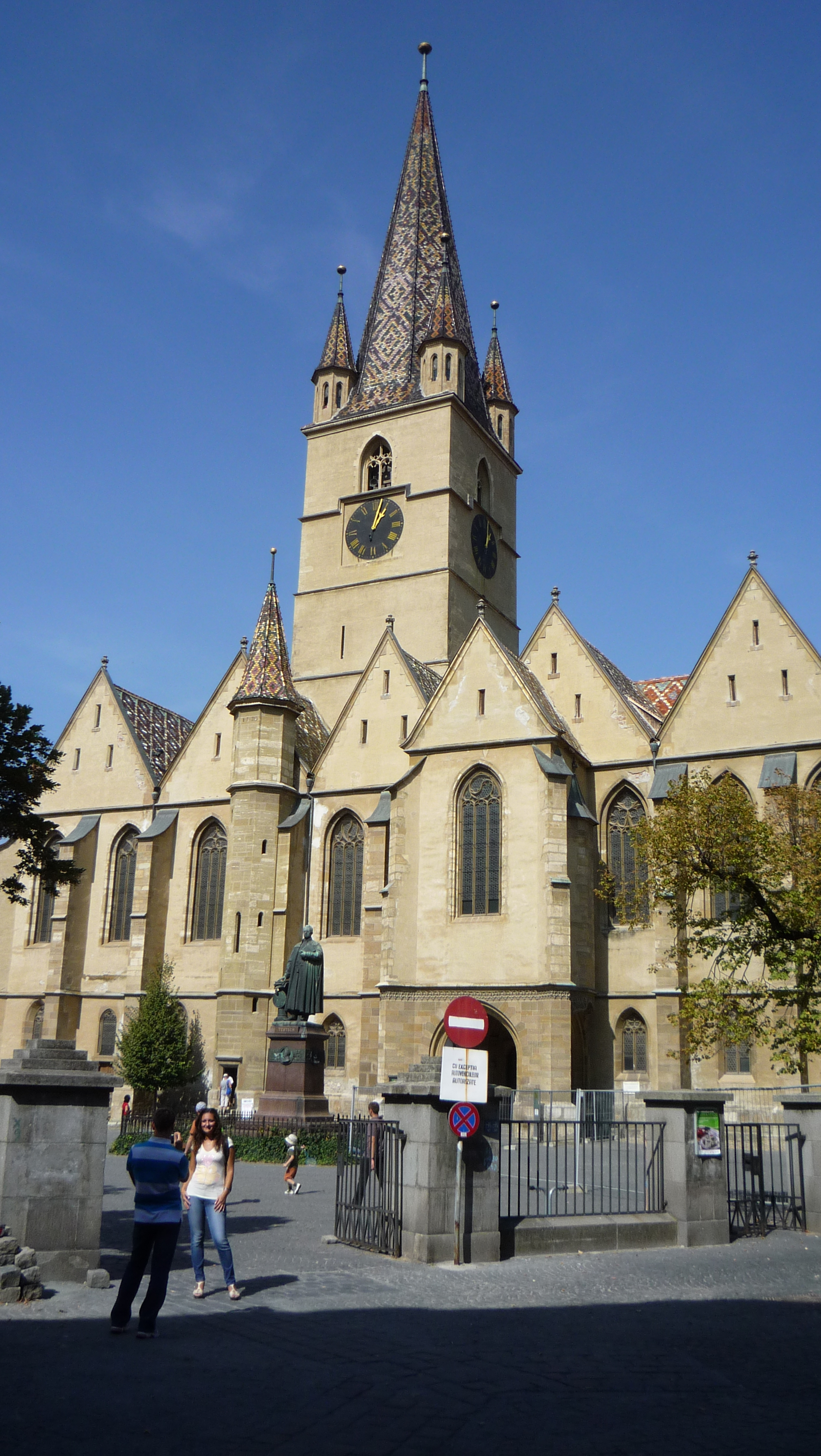
The Lutheran Cathedral in Sibiu

Before the Partition of Hungary, the Evangelical Lutheran Church of Romania was part of the Saxon Lutheran Church in Transylvania. In 1920 the German- and Hungarian-speaking congregations officially separated into two distinct bodies.

Currently there are three Lutheran denominations in Romania. The largest, the Evangelical Lutheran Church of Romania, has some Slovak- and Romanian-speaking congregations, but is mostly a Hungarian-speaking denomination. The Evangelical Church of Augustan Confession in Romania is a German-speaking denomination with some congregations holding bilingual services. The smallest is the newly-founded Confessional Lutheran Church in Romania, which is a LCMS foreign mission which has several congregations in Romania and Moldova.

==== Calvinism ====
The Reformed Church in Romania is an exclusively Hungarian-speaking denomination with some 495.000 members, making it the largest Protestant denomination in the country. Other Calvinist denominations with a presence in the country include the Reformed Presbyterian Church of Central and Eastern Europe, which has 13 congregations in Romania and missionary congregations from various foreign denominations such as the URCNA, IPC and PCB.

==== Other magisterial protestants ====
The Church of England has a congregation in Bucharest and the United Protestant Church of France has one in Iași.

==== Evangelicals ====
Evangelicals (or sometimes called "neo-Protestants" in Romania) are mostly identified with the Baptists, Plymouth Brethren, Pentecostals (both Apostolic and Assemblies) or members of various other independent churches. Not to be confused with any of the above, the Evangelical Church of Romania (0.08%), is an indigenous Eastern Protestant denomination with some similarities to the Plymouth Brethren.

=== Jehovah's Witnesses ===
Jehovah's Witnesses were banned and persecuted in some occasions in Romania from 1948 to 1989. In 1989, after the Romanian ban was lifted, members and representatives of the Governing Body of Jehovah's Witnesses were able to gather thousands of Romanian Jehovah's Witnesses that had been separated for a long time, but some of them still rejected certain doctrinal changes and preferred their autonomy, forming The True Faith Association of Jehovah's Witnesses in 1992.

Nowadays, Romania is the only country in the world to have 2 different Jehovah's Witnesses organizations.

As for the main group, in 2020, the number of Jehovah's Witnesses was 39,328 active publishers, united in 535 congregations; 74,363 people attended annual celebration of Lord's Evening Meal in 2020.

=== The Church of Jesus Christ of Latter-day Saints ===
The Church of Jesus Christ of Latter-day Saints (LDS Church) had some presence in the country from 1899–1913. Most of these early members emigrated to the west. The LDS Church was reintroduced in 1990 and a small branch was formed in Bucharest in 1991. In 2019, the LDS Church claimed 3,064 members in 15 congregations in Romania.

== Religious minorities ==
=== Hinduism ===
Since the end of World War II, thousands of Nepali, Bangladeshi and Indian immigrants have brought Hinduism with them. The International Society of Krishna Consciousness operates nearly a dozen temples throughout the nation's largest cities, such as Bucharest, Brașov, Timișoara, Oradea, and others. These temples organize large festivals with Hindu significance such as Ratha Yatra, Diwali and Durga Puja.

=== Islam ===
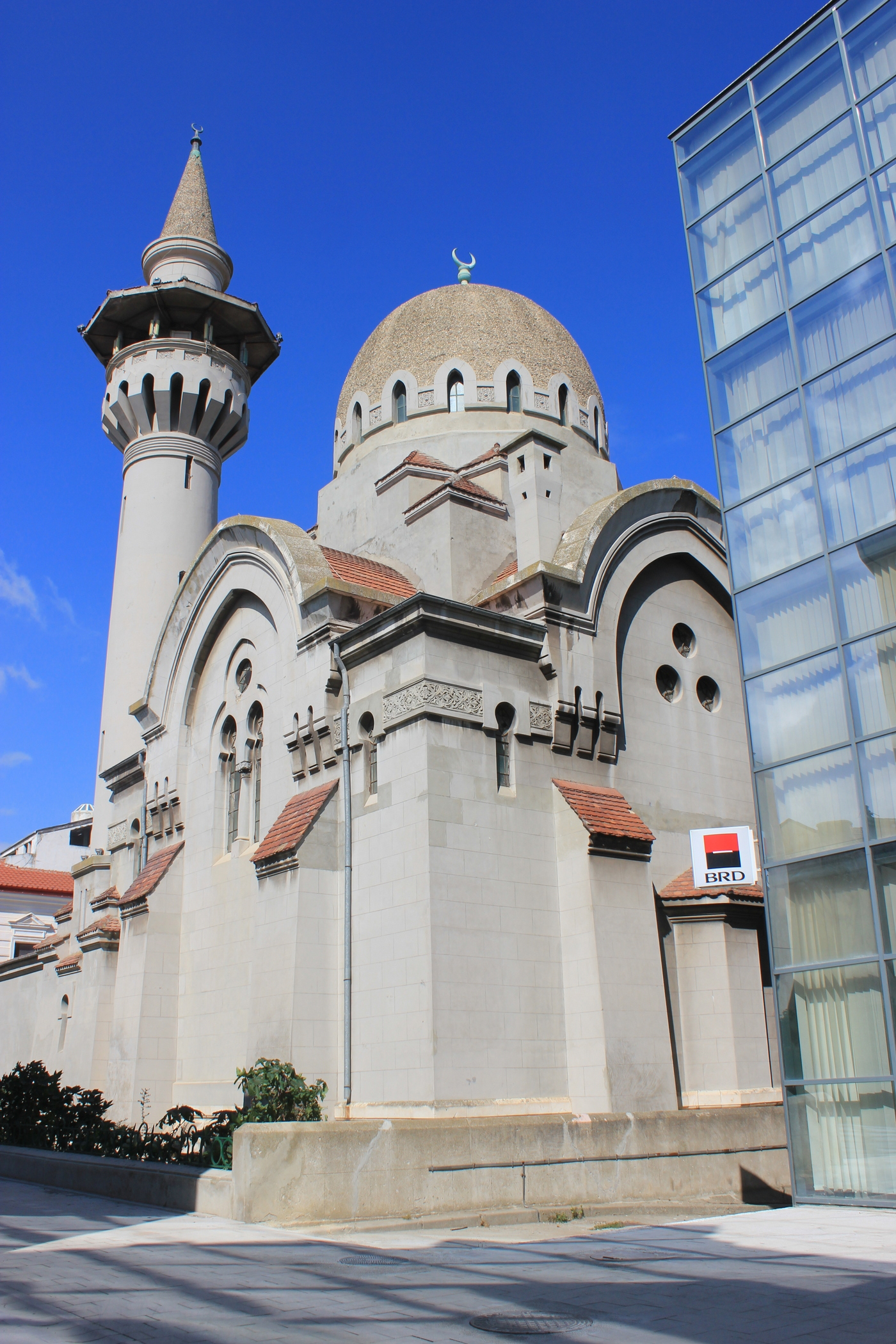
Grand Mosque of Constanța

Although the number of adherents of Islam is relatively small, Islam enjoys a 700-year tradition in Romania particularly in Northern Dobruja, a region on the Black Sea coast which was part of the Ottoman Empire for almost five centuries (ca. 1420–1878). According to the 2011 census, 64,337 people, approx. 0.3% of the total population, indicated that their religion was Islam. The majority of the Romanian Muslims belong to the Sunni Islam.

According to the 2022 census, 76,215 people, approximately 0.4% of the total population, indicated that their religion was Islam.

97% of the Romanian Muslims are residents of the two counties forming Northern Dobruja: eighty-five percent live in Constanța County, and twelve percent in Tulcea County. The remaining Muslims live in cities like Bucharest, Brăila, Călărași, Galați, Giurgiu, Drobeta-Turnu Severin. Ethnically, most of them are Tatars, followed by Turks, Albanians, Muslim Roma, and immigrants from the Middle East and Africa, although there are a few ethnic Romanian converts to Islam who even established a mosque in 2014. Since 2007, there are Indonesian, Bangladeshi and Pakistani workers coming to Romania, who are mostly Muslims.

In Romania there are about 80 mosques. One of the largest is the Grand Mosque of Constanța, originally known as the Carol I Mosque. It was built between 1910 and 1913, on the order of Carol I, in appreciation for the Muslim community in Constanța. According to the legal status of the Muslim denomination, the Romanian Muslim community is officially represented by a mufti, while the Muftiat is the denominational and cultural representative institution of the Muslim community, with a status similar to that of the other denominations officially recognized by the Romanian state. Likewise, Muslims in Constanța, which comprise approx. 6% of the population of this county, are represented in the Parliament by the Democratic Union of Turkish-Muslim Tatars of Romania, founded on 29 December 1989.

=== Judaism ===
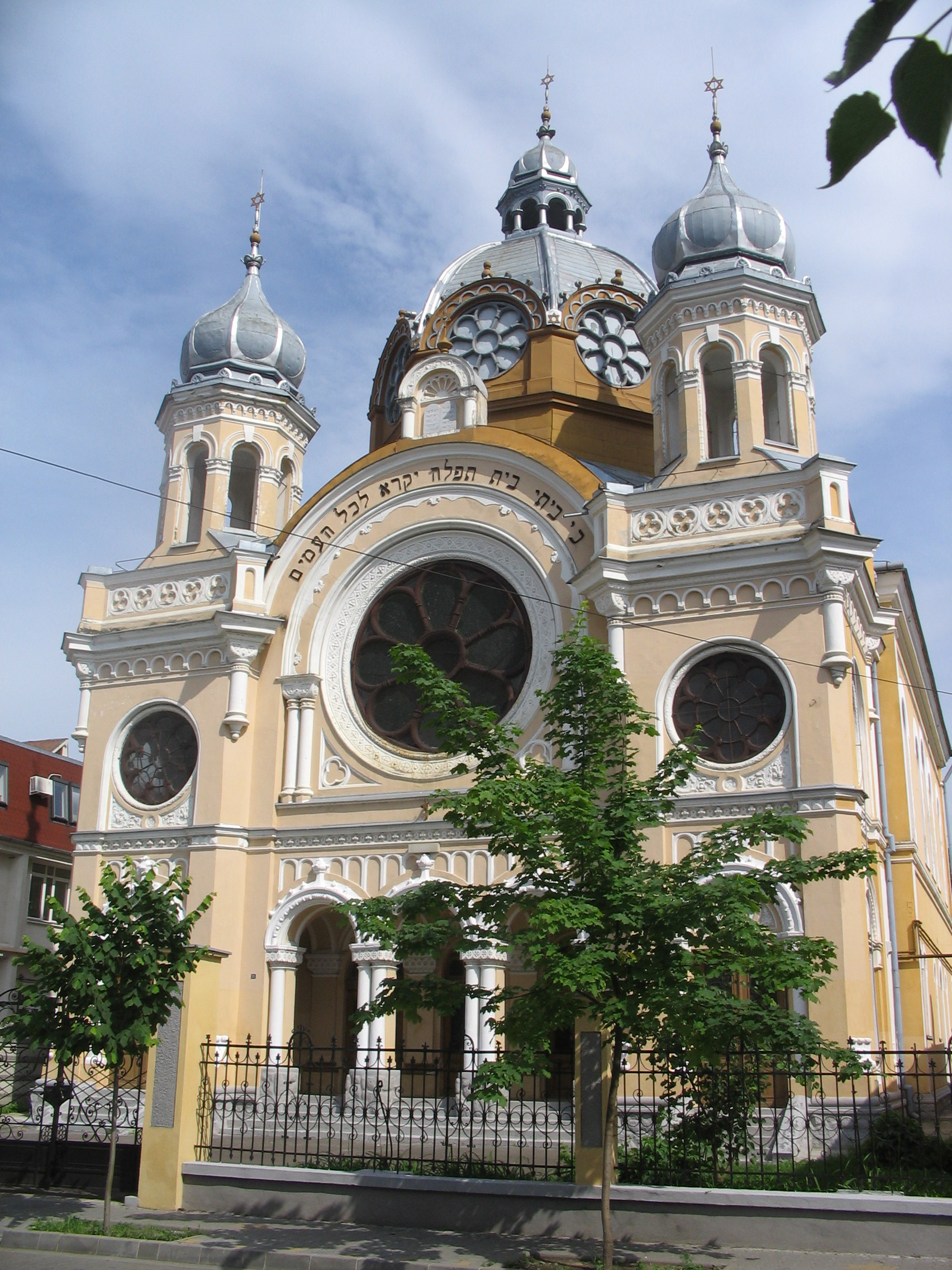
The Status Quo Synagogue in Târgu Mureș.

In 1930, more than 700,000 people in the Kingdom of Romania (including Bessarabia) practiced Judaism. By 2011, that number had dropped to 3,271. A legacy of the country's once numerous Jewish congregations is the large number of synagogues throughout Romania. Today, between 200,000 and 400,000 descendants of Romanian Jews are living in Israel.

== Other religions ==
Other denominations not listed above but recognised as official religions by the Romanian state are listed here. The Jehovah's Witnesses number around 50,000 adherents (0.25% of the stable population). Old Believers make up about 0.16% of the population with 30,000 adherents, who are mainly ethnic Russians living in the Danube Delta region. Serbian Orthodox believers are present in the areas which border Serbia and number about 14,000 people. Once fairly well represented in Romania, Judaism has fallen to around 3,500 adherents in 2011, which is about 0.02% of the population. Less still is the Armenian Christian minority, numbering about 400 people in total. The Association of Religion Data Archives reports roughly 1,900 followers of the Baháʼí Faith in the country as of 2010. Lastly, the number of people who have identified with other religions than the ones explicitly mentioned in the 2011 census comes to a total of about 30,000 people.

=== Paganism ===
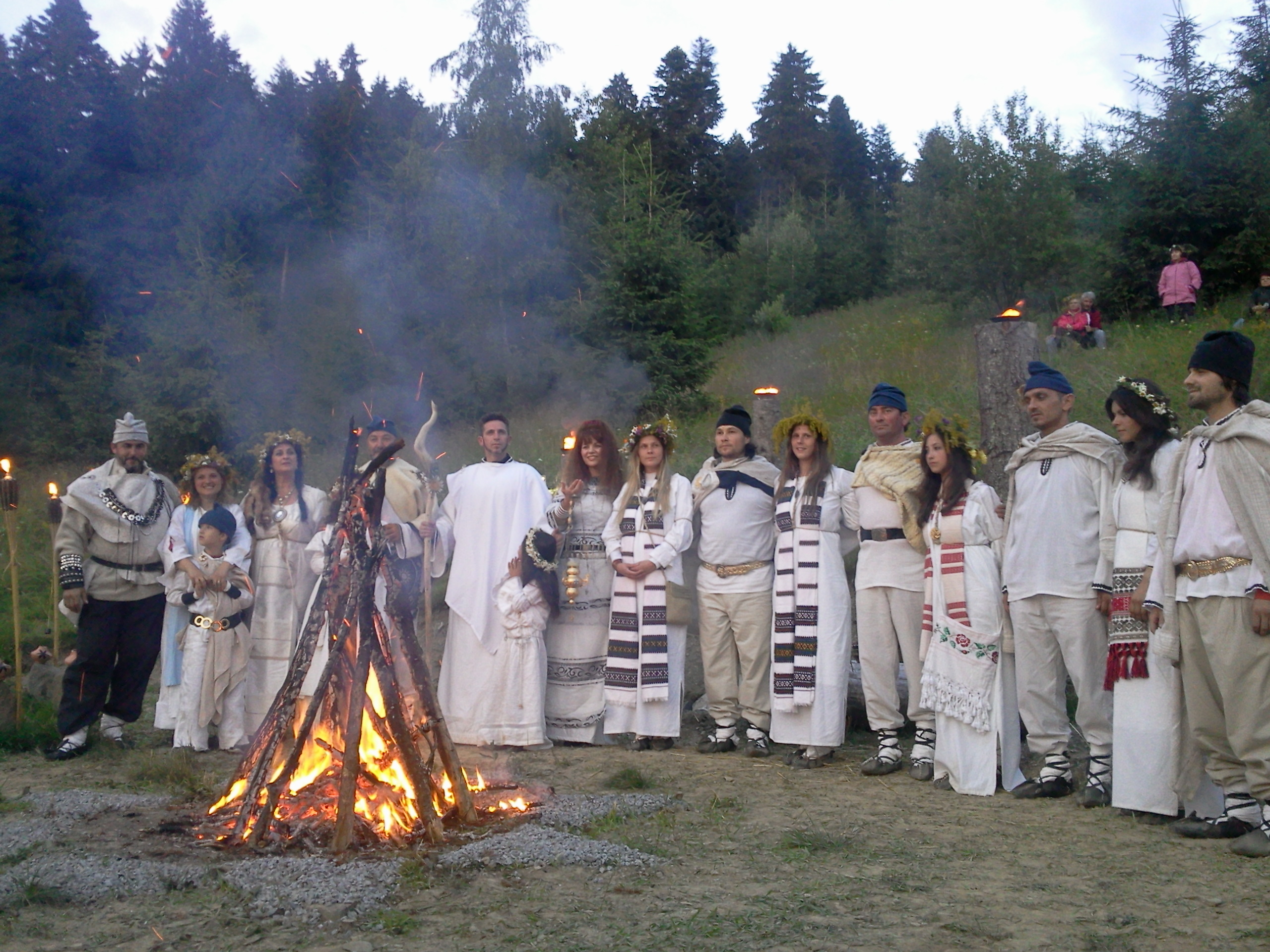
Zalmoxian fire rite

Neopagan groups have emerged in Romania over the latest decade, virtually all of them being ethno-pagan as in the other countries of European Union, although still small in comparison to other movements such as Ősmagyar Vallás in Hungary.

The revived ethnic religion of the Romanians is called Zalmoxianism and is based on Thracian mythological sources, with prominence given to the figure of god Zalmoxis. One of the most prominent Zalmoxian groups is the Gebeleizis Association (Romanian: Societatea Gebeleizis).

In the same time, in Romania there is a recognized pagan organization: THE NEW PAGAN DAWN Association, which attempts to defend the rights of the pagan community in Romania and to represent its voice.

=== Irreligion ===
Approximately 40,000 people have identified as nonreligious in Romania in the 2011 census, of which 21,000 declared atheists and 19,000 agnostics. Most of them are concentrated in major cities such as Bucharest or Cluj-Napoca. Irreligion is much lower in Romania than in most other European countries; one of the lowest in Europe.

=== Other and unknown ===
In the 2021 Romanian census, 13.94% of respondents refused to state a religious affiliation or were not asked this question. More accurately, about 9% of the population refused to declare their affiliation, and about 5% simply were not asked this question (they were missing from interviews, so their data was indirectly recorded, and it did not include religion).

== Attitudes towards religion ==
Religious affiliation in Romania according to the 2011 census, given as percentages of the total stable population.
1. Eastern Orthodoxy (86.7%)
2. Protestantism (6.90%)
3. Catholicism (5.42%)
4. Other (0.57%)
5. Not religious (0.10%)
6. Atheist (0.11%)
7. Unspecified (0.20%)

In 2008, 19% of Romanians placed "Faith" among maximum four answers to the question "Among the following values, which one is most important in relation to your idea of happiness?". It is the third highest number, after Armenia (27%), and Georgia (26%), at equality with Turkey (19%) and Cyprus (19%). The mean in EU-27 was 9%. According to a study by the Soros Foundation, over three quarters of Romanians consider themselves religious people, in a greater amount from rural areas, from women, from elders and from those with low income.

In 2011, 49% of Bucharesters declared that they only go to church on social occasions (weddings, Easter, etc.) or not at all. Only 26% told the same in the other parts of the country. According to preliminary data from the national 2011 census, 98.4% of the population declared themselves adherents of a religious denomination. This figure was contested, suggesting that the number of believers in disproportionately large. The final data for the 2011 national census shows a reduction of this figure to about 93.5% but includes a much larger portion of the population where religion-related data is missing (6.26%).

According to a survey conducted in July 2015, 96.5% of Romanians believe in God, 84.4% believe in saints, 69.6% believe in the existence of heaven, 57.5% in that of hell, and 54.4% in afterlife. 83% of Romanians say they observe Sundays and religious holidays, 74.6% worship when they pass by a church, 65.6% say they pray regularly, 60.2% state they sanctify their belongings, house, car, and 53.6% of Romanians donate regularly to the church.

On the other hand, practicing, church and mass attendance and other habits like praying or fasting is considerably lower, even compared to less religious countries than Romania.

== Religious freedom ==
The laws of Romania establish the freedom of religion as well as outlawing religious discrimination, and provide a registration framework for religious organizations to receive government recognition and funding (this is not a prerequisite for being able to practice in the country). The government also has programs for compensating religious organizations for property confiscated during World War II and during the rule of the Socialist Republic of Romania. Representatives of minority groups have complained that the government favors the Romanian Orthodox Church over other religious groups, and there have been several incidences of local government and police failing to enforce anti-discrimination laws reliably.

=== History ===
During the existence of the Kingdom of Romania in the 19th and early 20th centuries, the government of Romania systematically favored the Orthodox and Romanian Greek Catholic Churches. Non-Christians were denied citizenship until the late 20th century, and even then faced obstacles and limited rights. Antisemitism was a prominent feature of liberal political currents in the 19th century, before being abandoned by liberal parties and adopted by left-wing peasant and later fascist groups in the early 20th century. During World War II, several hundred thousand Jews were killed by Romanian and German forces in Romania. Although Jews living in territories belonging to Romania prior to the beginning of the war largely avoided this fate, they nevertheless faced harsh antisemitic laws passed by the Antonescu government. During the Socialist era following World War II, the Romanian government exerted significant control over the Orthodox Church and closely monitored religious activity, as well as promoting atheism among the population. Dissident priests were censured, arrested, deported, and/or defrocked, but the Orthodox Church as a whole acquiesced to the government's demands and received support from it.

== Historical evolution ==
=== Post 1989 ===
	Denominations and religious organizations	1992 census	2002 census	2011 census	2022 census	Trend
Traditional Christian denominations	Romanian Orthodox	19,802,389	18,817,975	16,367,267	13,989,584	▼
Traditional Christian denominations	Roman Catholic	1,161,942	1,026,429	869,246	741,276	▼
Traditional Christian denominations	Greek Catholic	223,327	191,556	160,275	115,364	▼
Traditional Christian denominations	Serbian Orthodox	–	–	14,385	55,206	▲
Traditional Christian denominations	(Orthodox) Old Believers	28,141	38,147	32,558	28,280	Steady
Traditional Christian denominations	(Orthodox) Old Calendarists	32,228	–	–	–	unknown
Traditional Christian denominations	Armenian Apostolic	2,023	775	393	804	▲
Protestant Christian denominations	Reformed	802,454	701,077	600,970	495,380	▼
Protestant Christian denominations	Pentecostal	220,824	324,462	367,938	404,307	▲
Protestant Christian denominations	Baptist	109,462	126,639	118,003	103,157	Steady
Protestant Christian denominations	Seventh-day Adventist	77,546	93,670	85,902	65,812	▼
Protestant Christian denominations	Unitarian	76,708	66,944	57,686	47,991	▼
Protestant Christian denominations	Evangelicals	49,963	44,476	42,495	36,339	▼
Protestant Christian denominations	Hungarian Lutheran	21,221	27,112	20,168	20,023	Steady
Protestant Christian denominations	Romanian Evangelical	–	18,178	15,514	7,680	▼
Protestant Christian denominations	German Lutheran	39,119	8,716	5,399	3,737	▼
Restorationist Movements	Jehovah's Witnesses	–	–	49,820	43,324	▼
Restorationist Movements	Mormons	99	1,545	2,800	3,064 (2019)	▲
Others	Islam	55,928	67,257	64,337	76,215	▲
Others	Judaism	9,670	6,057	3,519	2,707	▼
Others	Other religion	56,129	89,196	30,557	23,925	unknown
Others	Without religion	26,314	12,825	23,918	71,417	unknown
Others	Atheism	10,331	8,524	21,196	57,205	▲
Others	Undeclared	8,139	11,734	84,753	2,656,477	
Others	Unavailable	–	–	1,259,739		

Notes:

^{1} Census results were contested by the Romanian Greek Catholic Church which has a very different self-declared membership of: 2,011,635 (1995), 1,390,610 (2000), 707,452 (2010) and 504,280 (2016)

=== Historic Romania ===
	Denominations and religious organizations	1859–1860 census	1899 census	1912 census	1930 census
Traditional Christian denominations	Orthodox	4,198,862	5,451,787	6,735,444	13,108,227
Traditional Christian denominations	Roman Catholic	45,154	149,667	157,938	1,234,151
Traditional Christian denominations	Armenian Catholic	45,154	149,667	157,938	1,440
Traditional Christian denominations	(Orthodox) Old Believers	8,375	15,094	21,628	57,288
Traditional Christian denominations	Armenian Apostolic	8,178	5,787	6,985	10,005
Protestant Christian denominations	Baptist	28,903	22,749	24,727	60,562
Protestant Christian denominations	German Lutheran	28,903	22,749	24,727	398,759
Christian denominations after unification	Hungarian Lutheran	–	–	–	398,759
Christian denominations after unification	Greek Catholic	–	–	–	1,427,391
Christian denominations after unification	Reformed	–	–	–	710,706
Christian denominations after unification	Unitarian	–	–	–	69,257
Christian denominations after unification	Seventh-day Adventist	–	–	–	16,102
Other	Islam	1,323	44,732	46,406	185,486
Other	Judaism	134,168	266,652	241,088	756,930
Other	Other religion	–	222	1,104	7,434
Other	Without religion	–	–	–	6,604
Other	Undeclared	–	–	–	6,686

== Charts ==
Charts
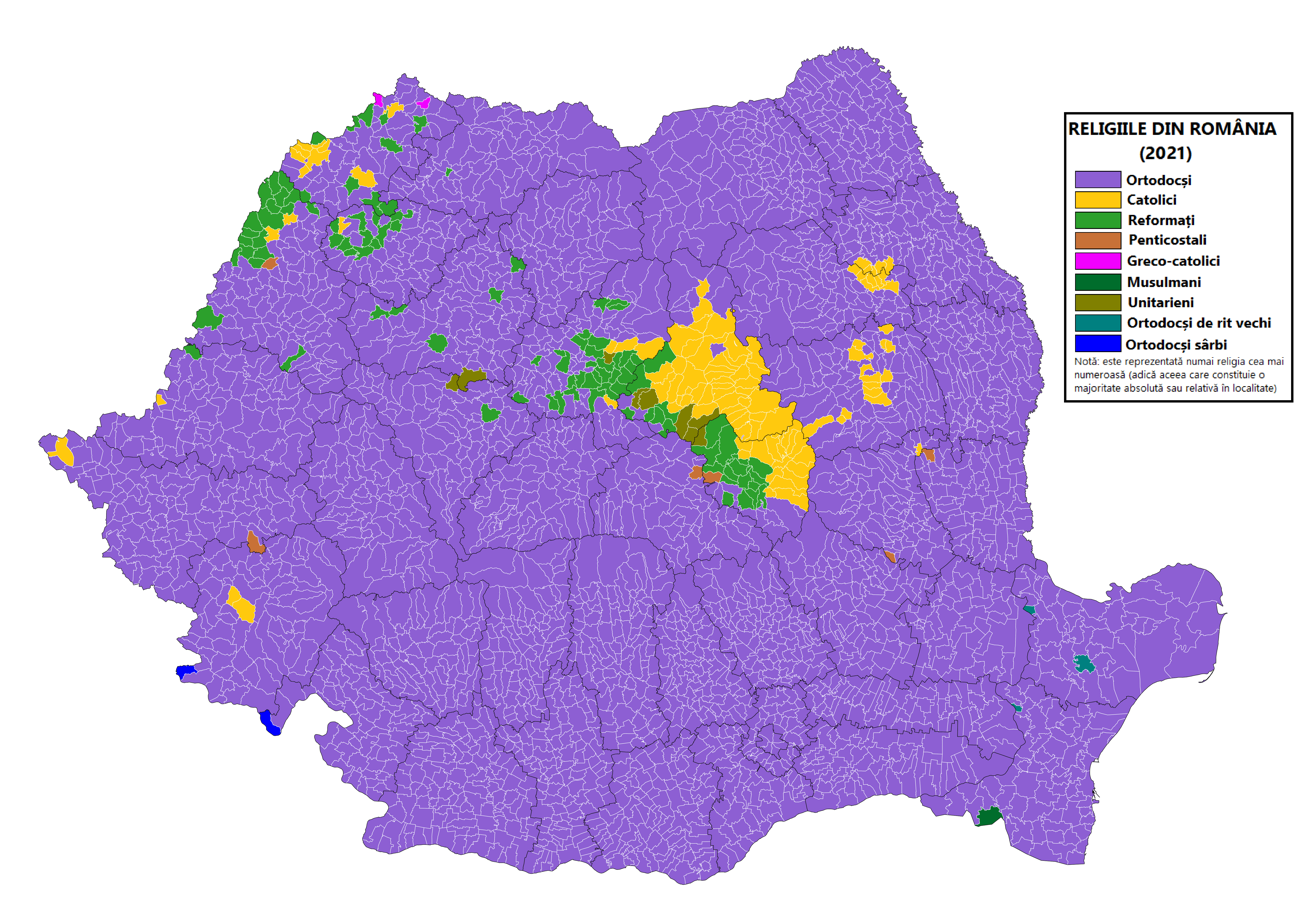
Geographical distribution of denominations (2021 census)

Romanian Orthodox Church organization

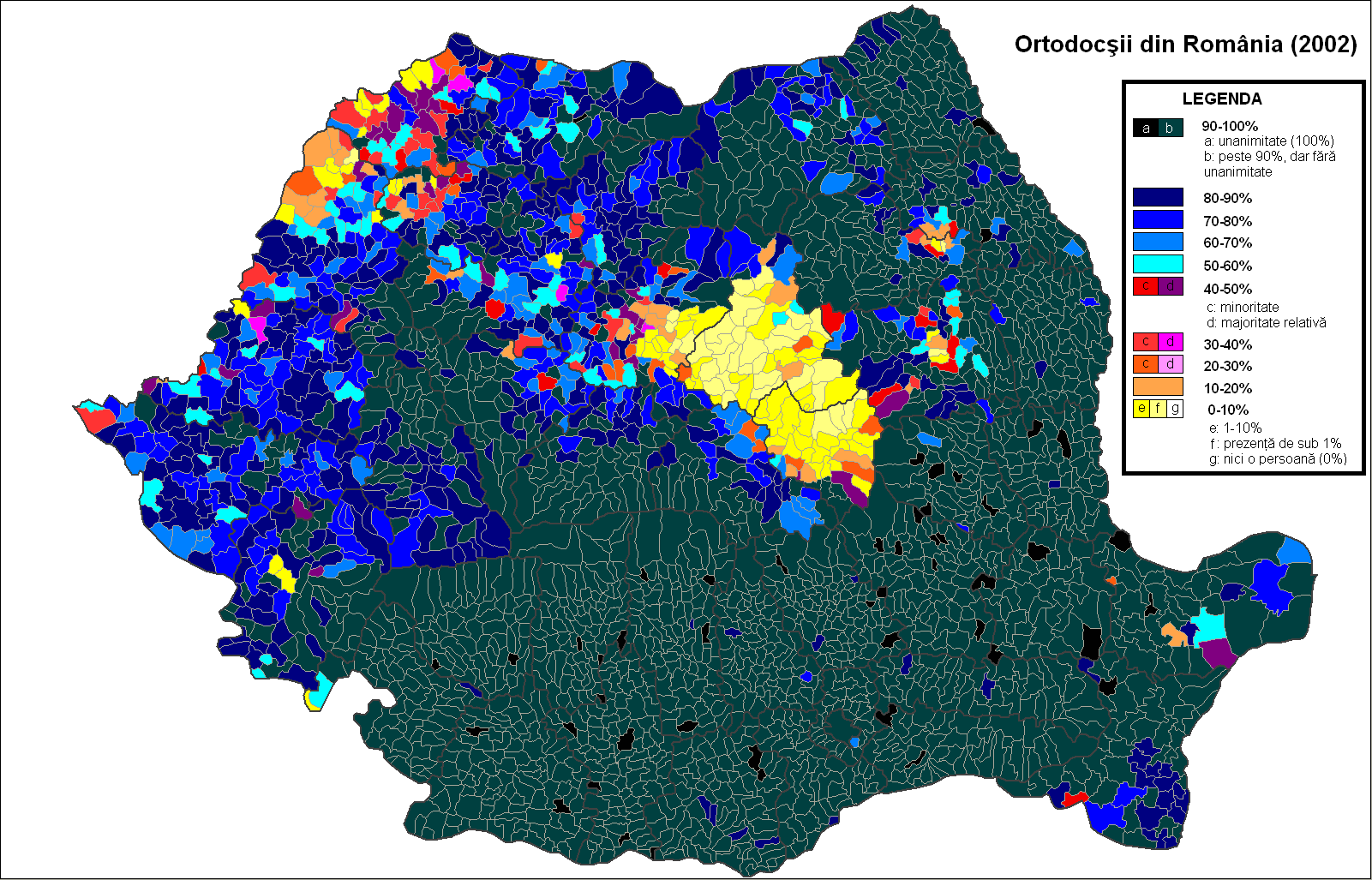
Eastern Orthodoxy in Romania (2002 census)

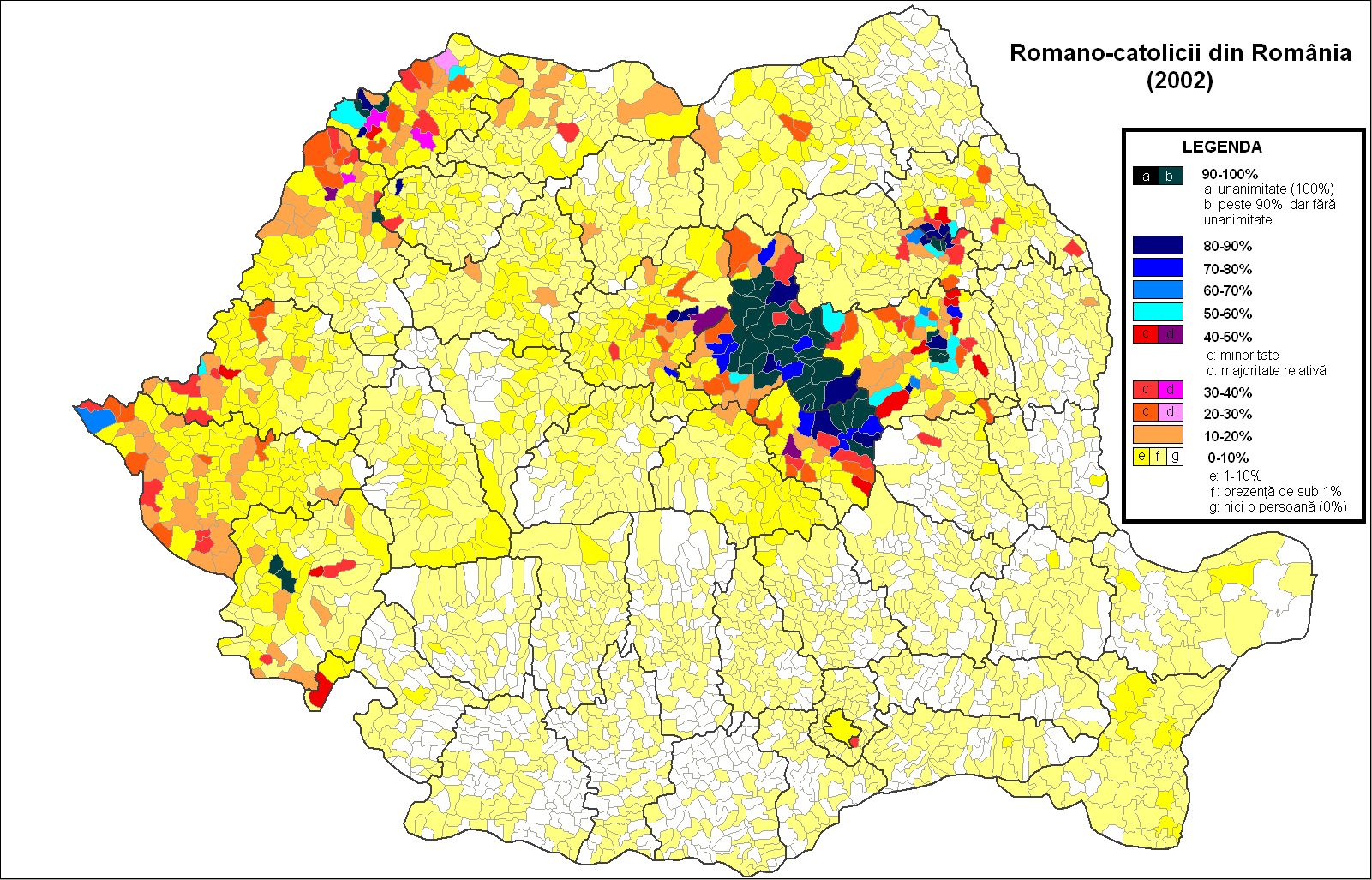
Catholicism in Romania (2002 census)

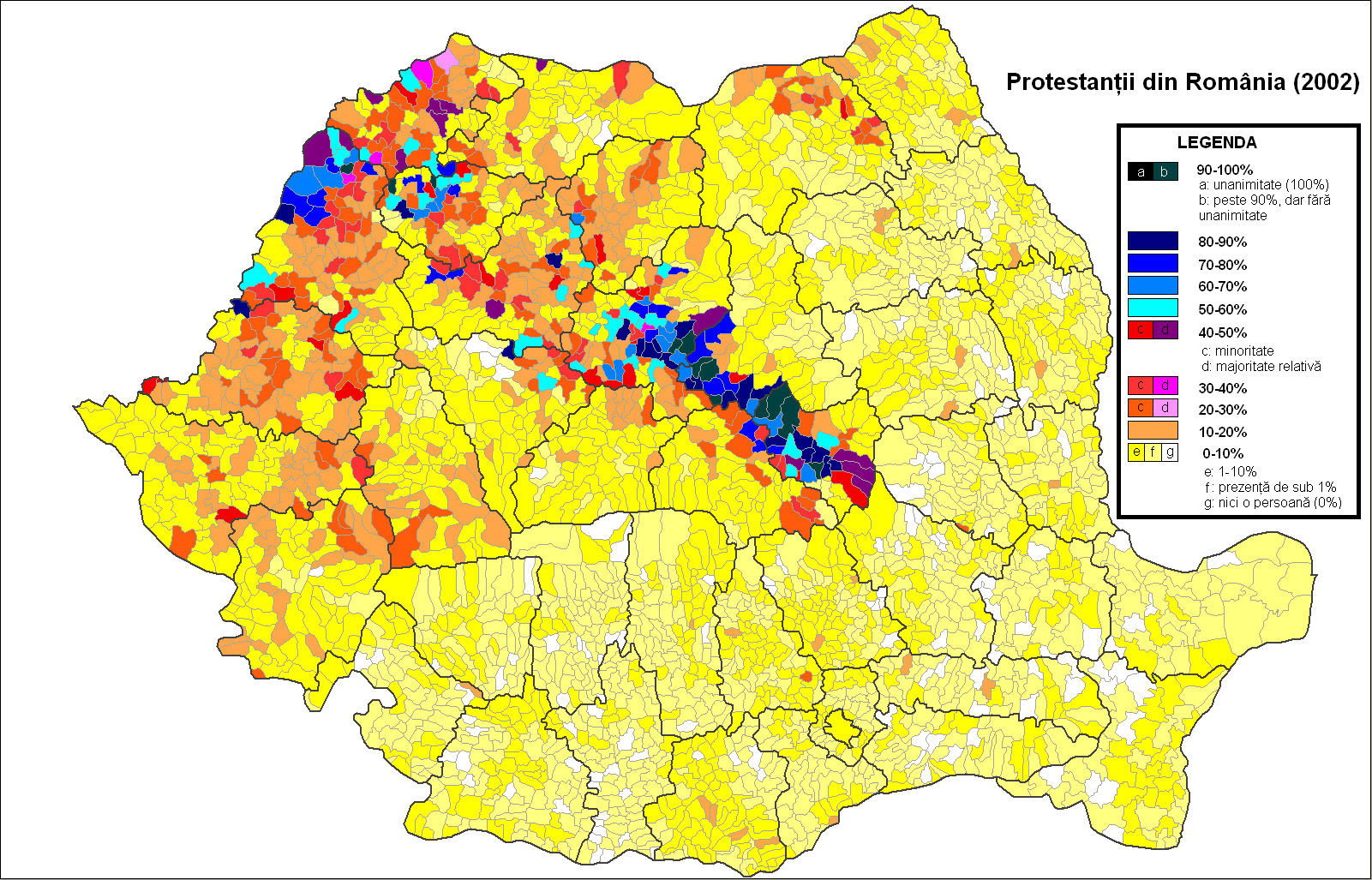
Protestantism in Romania (2002 census)

== See also ==
- Anti-religious campaign of Communist Romania
- Religion by country
- Religion in Europe

== Bibliography ==
- Lavinia Stan and Lucian Turcescu, Religion and Politics in Post-communist Romania, Oxford University Press, 2007. ISBN 0-19-530853-0
- Lavinia Stan and Lucian Turcescu, "Religion and Politics in Post-Communist Romania," in Quo Vadis Eastern Europe? Religion, State, Society and Inter-religious Dialogue after Communism, ed. by Ines A. Murzaku (Bologna, Italy: University of Bologna Press, 2009), pp. 221–235.
- Lavinia Stan and Lucian Turcescu, "Politics, National Symbols and the Romanian Orthodox Cathedral," Europe-Asia Studies, vol. 58, no. 7 (November 2006), pp. 1119–1139.
- Lavinia Stan and Lucian Turcescu, "Pulpits, Ballots and Party Cards: Religion and Elections in Romania," Religion, State and Society, vol. 33, no 4 (December 2005), pp. 347–366.
- Lavinia Stan and Lucian Turcescu, "The Devil's Confessors: Priests, Communists, Spies and Informers," East European Politics and Societies, vol. 19, no. 4 (November 2005), pp. 655–685.
- Lavinia Stan and Lucian Turcescu, "Religious Education in Romania," Communist and Post-Communist Studies, vol. 38, no. 3 (September 2005), pp. 381–401.
- Lavinia Stan and Lucian Turcescu, "Religion, Politics and Sexuality in Romania," Europe-Asia Studies, vol. 57, no. 2 (March 2005), pp. 291–310.
- Lavinia Stan and Lucian Turcescu, "The Romanian Orthodox Church and Post-Communist Democratization", Europe-Asia Studies, vol. 52, no. 8 (December 2000), pp. 1467–1488, republished in East European Perspectives, vol. 3, no. 4 (22 February 2001), available online at East European Perspectives: February 22, 2001, and vol. 3, no. 5 (7 March 2001), available online at East European Perspectives: March 7, 2001.
- Flora, Gavril; and Georgina Szilagyi; Victor Roudometof (April 2005). "Religion and national identity in post-communist Romania". Journal of Southern Europe and the Balkans. 7 (1): 35–55. doi:10.1080/14613190500036917. S2CID 155517149.
