= Camăr =

Camăr Kémer
- Commune
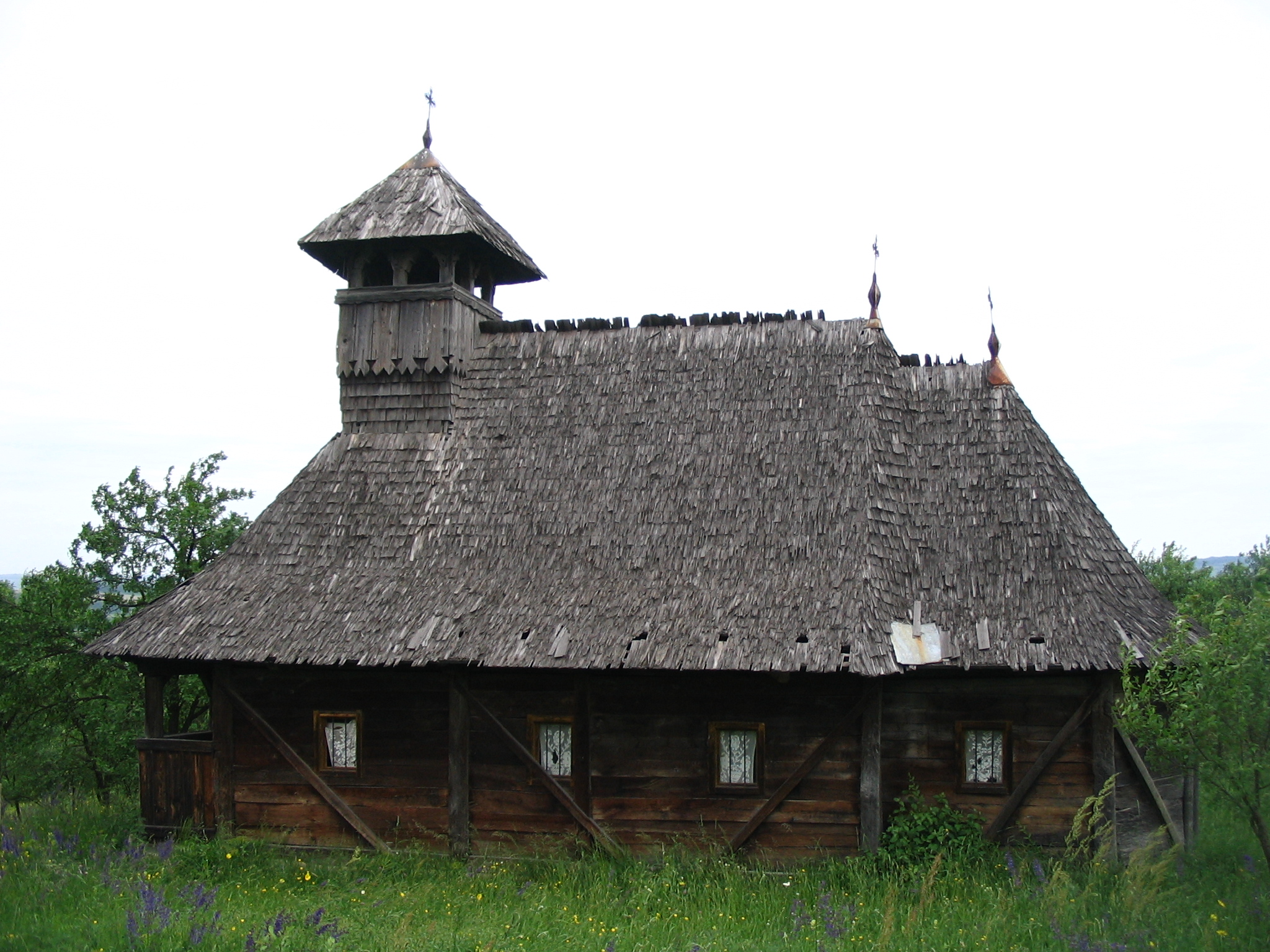
- Wooden Church in Camăr

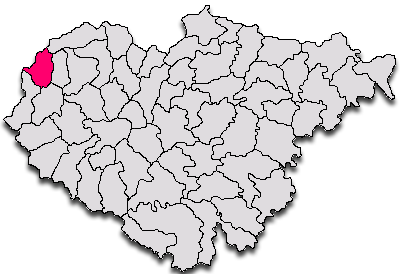
- Location in Sălaj County

- Location in Romania
- Coordinates: 47°18′N 22°37′E
- Country: Romania
- County: Sălaj

Government
  - Mayor (2020–2024): Levente-György Szabó (UDMR)
- Area: 39.83 km^{2} (15.38 sq mi)
- Elevation: 185 m (607 ft)
- Population (2021-12-01): 1,618
  - Density: 40.62/km^{2} (105.2/sq mi)
- Time zone: UTC+02:00 (EET)
  - Summer (DST): UTC+03:00 (EEST)
- Postal code: 457060
- Area code: +(40) 260
- Vehicle reg.: SJ
- Website: www.camarsj.ro

Camăr (Hungarian: Kémer) is a commune located in Sălaj County, Crișana, Romania. It is composed of two villages, Camăr and Pădureni (Erdőaljarakottyás).

The commune is located in the western part of county, on the border with Bihor County. It is situated at an altitude of 185 m (607 ft), or the banks of the river Camăr.

== Population ==
At the 2002 census, Camăr had 1,899 inhabitants; of those, 91.7% were Hungarians, 6.4% Romanians, and 1.9% Roma. 68.4% were Reformed, 12.6% Baptist, 5.1% each Greek-Catholic and Christian Evangelical, 4.5% Seventh-day Adventist, 1.9% Pentecostal, 1.3% Romanian Orthodox, and 0.8% Roman Catholic.

At the 2011 census, the population had decreased to 1,741; of those, 86.67% were Hungarians, 6.15% Romanians, and 6.15% Roma. At the 2021 census, the commune had a population of 1,618, of which 86.71% were Hungarians, 6% Roma, and 5.69% Romanians.

== Sights ==
- Wooden Church, Camăr, built in the 18th century, historic monument
