= Emanuel Baptist Church of Oradea =

Church in Oradea, Romania

- Location: Oradea, Bihor county
- Country: Romania
- Denomination: Union of Christian Baptist Churches in Romania
- Website: bbeo.ro

Emanuel Baptist Church of Oradea (Romanian: Biserica Baptistă Emanuel Oradea), formerly known as the Second Baptist Church of Oradea, is a Baptist megachurch located in Oradea, Romania. It is affiliated with the Union of Christian Baptist Churches in Romania.

== History ==
The church was founded in 1974 as the Second Baptist Church of Oradea.

In 1990, the church founded the Emanuel Bible Institute, which became Emanuel University of Oradea in 1998. The building was completed in 1993.

In 2017, the church had 2,400 congregants.
