= Romanian Evangelical Alliance =

Evangelical Christian organisation

- Alianța Evanghelică din România
- Abbreviation: A.E.R.
- Type: Communion
- Classification: Evangelicalism
- Orientation: Interdenominational
- Scripture: Bible
- Polity: Congregationalist
- Structure: Full communion
- President: Cornel Haureș
- Branch Leaders: Cornel Haureș (Evangelicals); Sorin Bădrăgan (Baptists); Ioan Filip (Pentecostals)
- Region: Romania
- Language: Romanian
- Headquarters: Șos. Andronache nr. 60A, Sector 2, Bucharest
- Founder: Iosif Țon
- Origin: 21 October 1990; Palace Hall, Bucharest
- Members: 543.803 (in 2023): 103.157 (baptists); 404.307 (pentecostals); 36.339 (evangelicals)
- Official website: https://aliantaevanghelica.wordpress.com/

The Romanian Evangelical Alliance (Romanian: Alianța Evanghelică din România) is an evangelical Christian organization that comprises three distinguished denominations that are in full communion with each other: the Baptist Union of Romania, Apostolic Church of God and Christian Evangelical Church of Romania.

== History ==
=== Formation ===
The alliance was directly inspired by the Evangelical Alliance and the National Association of Evangelicals, who managed to unite multiple Christian denominations both in UK and United States with the hope of preaching the gospel to more people. Established in 1990 from the initiative of multiple evangelical religious figures, most notably Baptist pastor Iosif Țon, the idea of a Romanian Evangelical Alliance took birth in January, after the fall of communism, when Iosif first came back in the country after years of exile. On 25 April, alongside Silviu Cioată, Vasile Taloș and Emil Bulgăr, Iosif organised a meeting between all evangelical leaders. Together they analysed the doctrinal differences and after realising how few they were, decided to form the union. The first congress of the alliance was held in October 1990 at the Palace Hall in Bucharest.

=== List of presidents ===
This is a list of the Alliance presidents since its formation:

| Nº | Name Born - Died | Term start | Term end | Duration | Denomination |
|---|---|---|---|---|---|
| — | Vasile Taloş (1944–2020) | 5 April 1990 | 21 October 1990 | 6 months and 16 days | Baptist Union of Romania |
| 1 | Paul Negruţ (1953–) | 21 October 1990 | 9 October 1994 | 3 years, 11 months and 18 days | Baptist Union of Romania |
| 2 | Emil Bulgăr (1930–2003) | 9 October 1994 | 31 October 1998 | 4 years and 22 days | Pentecostal Union of Romania |
| 3 | David Ciucur (1949–) | 31 October 1998 | 26 October 2002 | 3 years, 11 months and 26 days | Christian Evangelical Church of Romania |
| (1) | Paul Negruţ (1953–) | 26 October 2002 | 23 September 2006 | 3 years, 10 months and 28 days | Baptist Union of Romania |
| 4 | Moise Ardelean (1955–) | 23 September 2006 | January 2007 | c. 4 months | Pentecostal Union of Romania |
| — | Ioan Moldovan (1961–) | 1 January 2007 | 4 June 2011 | 4 years, 5 months and 3 days | Pentecostal Union of Romania |
| 5 | Virgil Achihai (1959–) | 4 June 2011 | 2 October 2015 | 4 years, 3 months and 28 days | Christian Evangelical Church of Romania |
| 6 | Viorel Iuga (1962–) | 2 October 2015 | 12 August 2020 | 4 years, 10 months and 10 days | Baptist Union of Romania |
| (4) | Moise Ardelean (1955–) | 12 August 2020 | 4 November 2022 | 2 years, 2 months and 23 days | Pentecostal Union of Romania |
| 7 | Ioan Filip (1962–) | 4 November 2022 | 21 August 2024 | 1 year, 9 months and 17 days | Pentecostal Union of Romania |
| 8 | Cornel Haureş (1970–) | 21 August 2024 | - | 4 years | Christian Evangelical Church of Romania |

== Doctrinal differences ==
Although similar in their beliefs, the three Romanian evangelical denominations are divided over 3 major doctrines that define them as being their own denomination:

=== Eschatology ===
Some Pentecostals and Evangelical Christians believe in the rapture of the Church prior to the Second Coming. After the great tribulation, Jesus will descend in Jerusalem and reign in the Earth for 1000 years before the Final Judgment (a view called dispensational premillennialism).

On the other hand, Baptists are generally amillennials, believing that Jesus's "1000 years reign" from Revelation 20 is metaphorical. They believe that the universal resurrection and Final Judgment will happen at the same time with Jesus's second coming and, immediately after, the Eternal Kingdom will be established.

=== Ecclesiology ===
While Pentecostals and Baptists ordain their ministers, the Evangelical Christians have lay ministers.

=== Spiritual gifts ===
Pentecostals believe that spiritual gifts are still present in the church today. Those include signs and wonders, prophecy, healing and speaking in tongues. The latter is also seen as an indicator of Baptism with the Holy Spirit.

Baptists and Evangelical Christians are officially cessationists considering that speaking in tongues was a power that ceased with the end of the Apostolic Age.

== See also ==
- Religion in Romania
- Freedom of religion in Romania
- Romanian Orthodox Church
- Evangelical Church of Romania
- Catholic Church in Romania
