= Irreligion in Romania =

Religion in Romania 2011 census
1. Orthodox Christianity (81.0%)
2. Protestantism (6.20%)
3. Catholicism (5.10%)
4. Other (1.50%)
5. Not religious (0.20%)
6. No data (6.00%)

Eurobarometer Poll 2010
Believes in spirit or life force	7%
Believes there is a god	92%
Does not believe in spirit, God or life force	1%

Irreligion in Romania is rare. Romania is one of the most religious countries in Europe, with 92% of people saying that they believe in God. Levels of irreligion are much lower than in most other European countries and are among the lowest in the world. At the 2011 census, only 0.11% of the population declared itself atheist, up from the 2002 census, while 0.10% do not belong to any religion. While still one of the most religious countries in Europe, practicing church and mass attendance is quite low, even compared to some less religious countries than Romania. It is mainly practiced by elderly people, mainly in rural areas, while in urban areas church attendance and practice is much lower. As of 2021, almost 85% are declared religious, of which about 73% are declared orthodox, 12% other religions, about 1% atheists or irreligious and about 14% declared nothing about religion.

== History ==
Prior to Romania's independence from the Ottoman Empire, church and state were closely aligned. As an independent country, Romania was able to set its own religious policies, allowing for some level of separation of church and state. Freethought and anti-clericalism were imported to Romania from Western Europe in the mid-19th century. Proponents of freethought, such as Constantin Thiron and Panait Zosin of the University of Iasi, worked to spread the philosophy, though it remained relatively obscure in the country. One early debate over secularism in Romania was that of cremation; the Orthodox church opposed cremation and came into conflict with secular advocates of the practice until its legalization in 1936.

Marxist atheism became prominent in Romania after the country fell under Communist rule in 1945. The Orthodox Church was severely restricted in its practices, and minor religions were banned entirely. Due to the prevalence of the Orthodox Church in Romanian society, state atheism was not implemented to the extent that it was in many other Communist countries. Instead, the Communist Party prioritized propaganda against religion in favor of Marxist science. Priests were also converted into propagandists and spies for the Communist regime. After the Communist regime fell in 1989, atheism was widely marginalized in Romania due to its associations with the terrors of Communism. Remus Cernea is seen as the leader of freethought and atheist belief in the early 21st century.

Irreligion and atheism tend to be higher in urban areas and well developed cities than in rural areas and lower developed areas.

== Demographics ==
Over 20,700 people in Romania are atheists, according to 2011 census. Thus, the number of Romanians who do not believe in God almost tripled in the previous decade. The highest concentration is in Bucharest–Ilfov area (nearly 8,000 atheists) and generally wealthy areas of the country (Transylvania, Banat), the lowest – in Oltenia (750), Dobruja and poor areas of Wallachia (Teleorman, Călărași, Ialomița). Before the census of October 2011, Secular Humanist Association (ASUR) conducted a campaign through which tried to promote an accurate census, in which people who consider themselves atheists to have confidence in selecting this option. According to ASUR, European Values Survey (1999) and World Values Survey (2005) polls show that the real percentage of those who declare themselves atheists is at least 6–7% of the population, 60–70 times more than the result of census in 2002. In The Cambridge Companion to Atheism (2006), Phil Zuckerman gives a figure of 4%. A 2014 poll by WIN/Gallup International Association shows that 16% of Romanians are not religious and only 1% are convinced atheists.

>0.5%
0.1–0.5%
<0.1%

Development region	Irreligious	Atheists	Total
București-Ilfov	3,295	8,517	11,812 (0.51%)
Centru	5,611	2,085	7,696 (0.32%)
Nord-Est	1,213	1,629	2,842 (0.08%)
Nord-Vest	4,622	3,098	7,720 (0.29%)
Sud-Est	607	1,321	1,928 (0.07%)
Sud-Muntenia	970	1,443	2,413 (0.07%)
Sud-Vest Oltenia	380	525	905 (0.04%)
Vest	2,219	2,125	4,344 (0.23%)
Total	18,917	20,743	39,660

=== Surveys ===
Survey/Study	Year	Atheists	Agnostics	Irreligious
The Cambridge Companion to Atheism	2006	4%		
Dentsu Inc.	2006			2,4%
WIN/Gallup International	2014	1%		16%

=== Socio-demographic profile ===
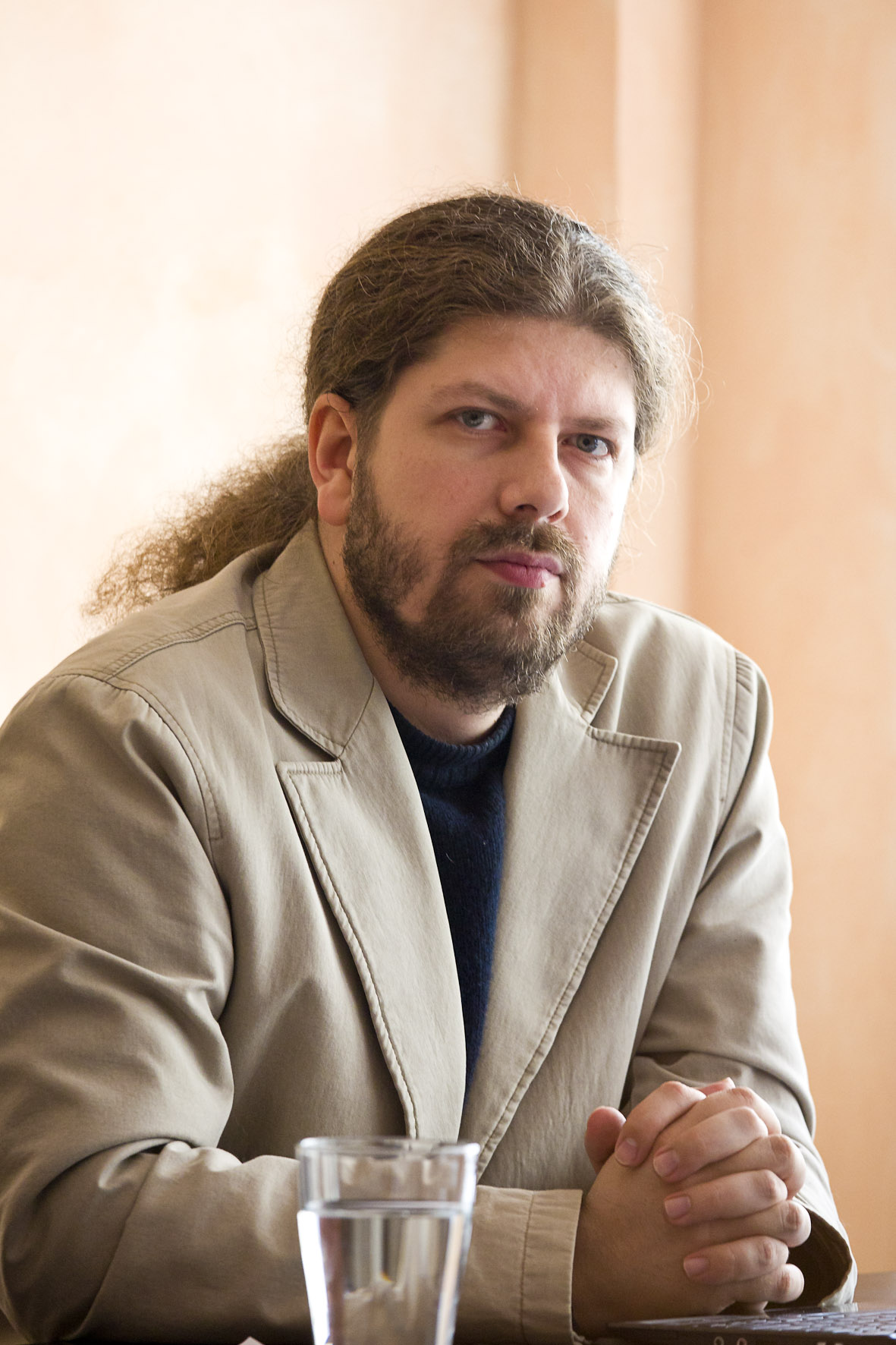
Remus Cernea, the only avowed atheist MEP

According to a study conducted by researchers from Open Society Foundations, Romanian atheists are a very young group and with a significantly higher level of education that the national average: 53% of atheists are under 30 years, and 33% of them have completed higher education. The group of atheists/agnostics/persons without religion lives in a proportion of 59% in urban areas – in the capital and other major cities – and are easier to find in Wallachia and harder in Moldavia.

Atheists are more intolerant than most Romanians with regard to almost all social groups on which were questioned: Roma, sectarians, Hungarians, Muslims, Jews and poor. The only exception to this string of intolerance is represented by homosexuals, towards them atheists showing more tolerance than the national average. As ideological positioning, atheists declare themselves, equally, both right-wing and left-wing, most of them (56%) placing at the center of the ideological line. Only eight percent say they prefer leftist economic policies, while right-wing economic policies attract 47% of atheists.

== See also ==
- Demographics of Romania
- List of countries by irreligion
- Religion in Romania
