= Emanuel University of Oradea =

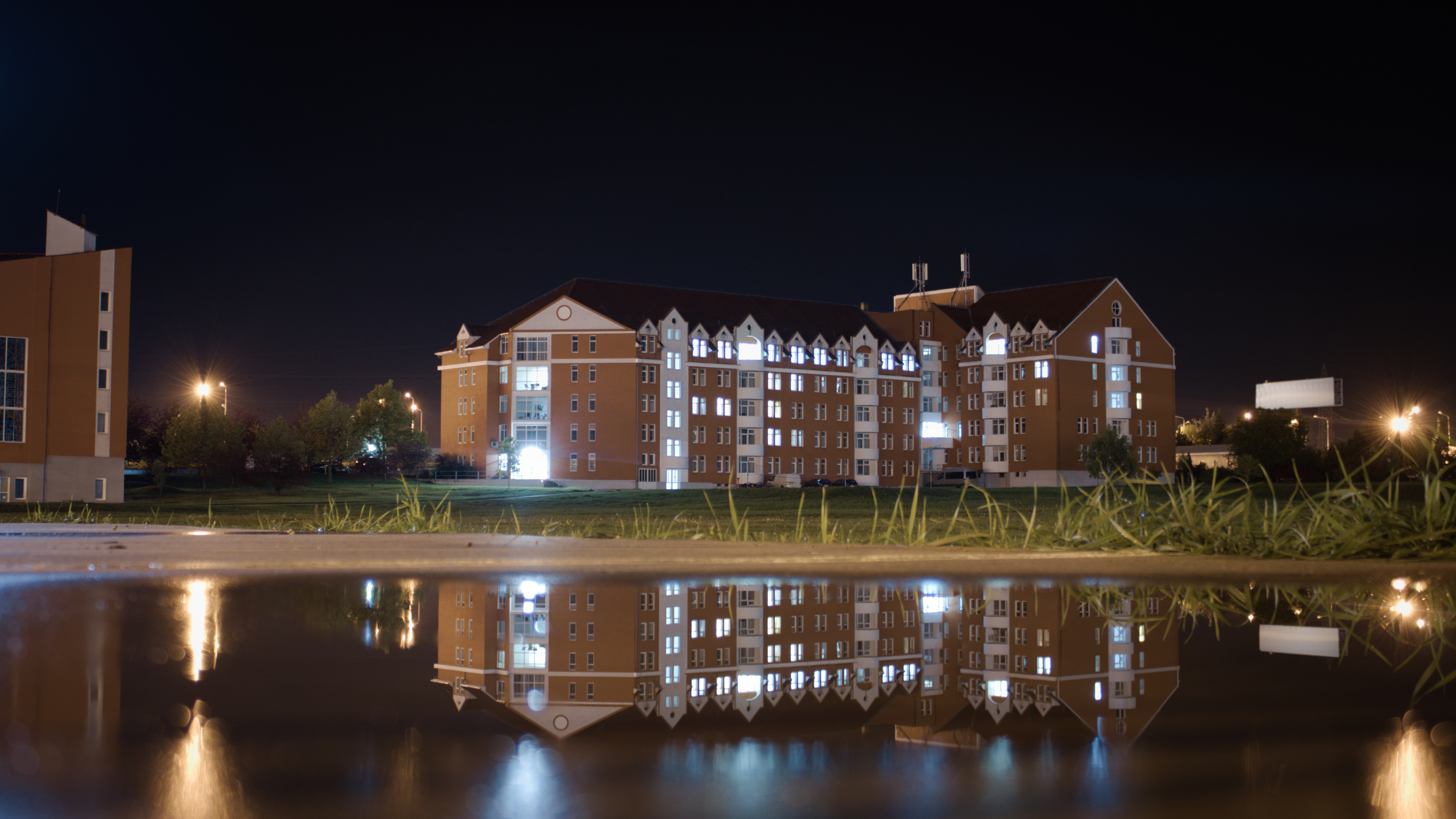
- Motto: Integrity and excellence
- Type: Private
- Established: 1990
- Religious affiliation: Union of Christian Baptist Churches in Romania
- Rector: Paul Negruṭ
- Location: Oradea, Bihor, Romania; 47.0267°N 21.9555°E
- Website: emanuel.ro

Emanuel University of Oradea is a private Baptist university based in Oradea, Romania. It is affiliated with the Union of Christian Baptist Churches in Romania.

== History ==
The roots of Emanuel University of Oradea were planted in 1990, as Emanuel Bible Institute by Emanuel Baptist Church of Oradea. It was an underground Bible institute to train the upcoming pastors and missionaries of the Communist Romania.

In 1998, the school became "Emanuel University".

Emanuel University of Oradea is the only government accredited evangelical Christian university in Europe. It is functioning under the spiritual authority of the Emanuel Baptist Church of Oradea, and under the academic authority of the Romanian Department of Education by the accreditation it was granted.

== Programs ==
Emanuel University of Oradea currently has six bachelor's degree programs, these being Pastoral Theology, Music, Social Work, Language and Literature (English and Romanian), Management, and IT.

Their master's degree programs are Pastoral Theology and Missiology, Entrepreneurial Management, Musical Arts, and Community Programs and Projects in Social Work.

== See also ==
- List of universities in Romania
