= Wooden Church, Camăr =

Church in Sălaj County, Romania

- Biserica de lemn din Camăr
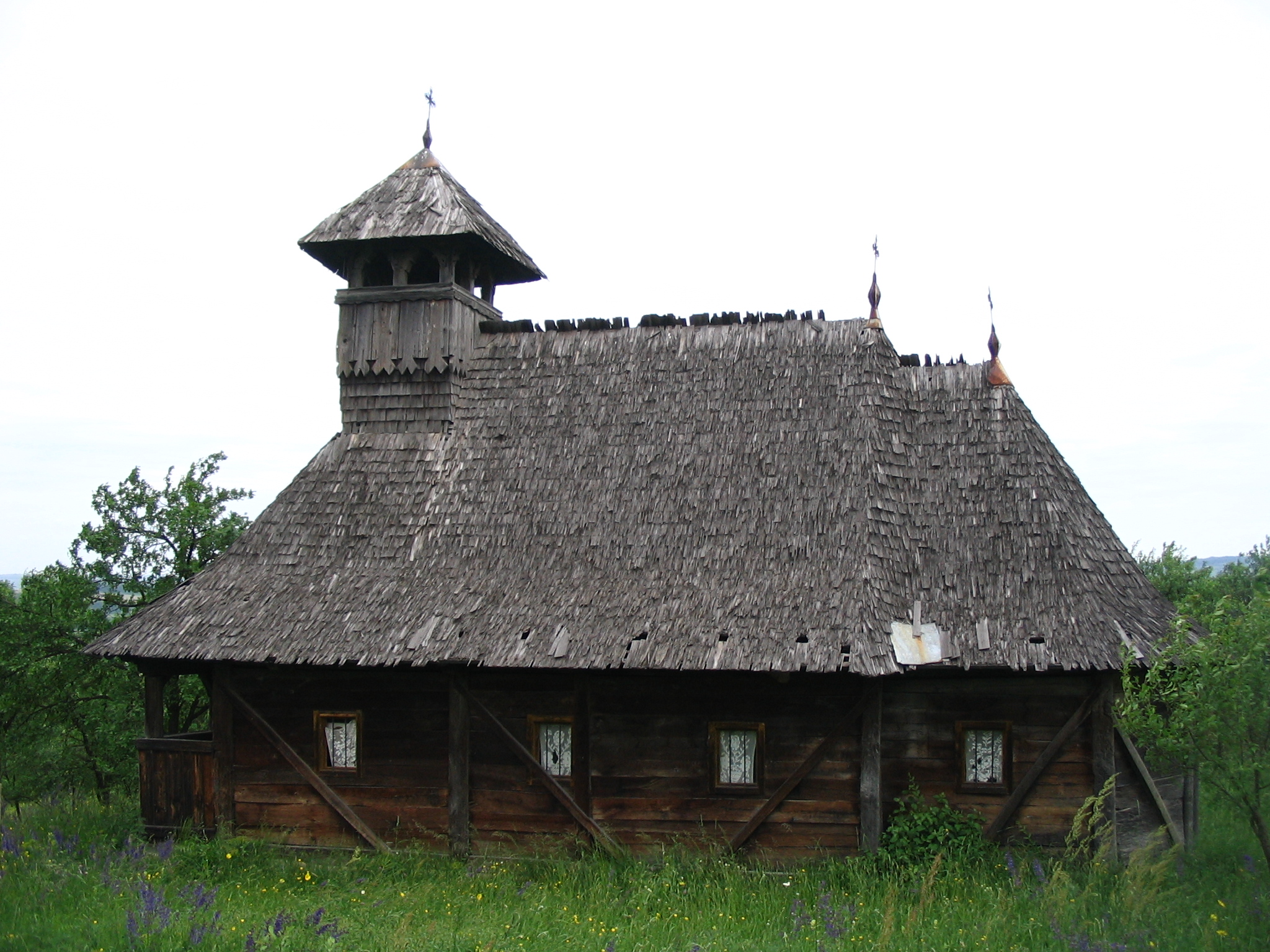

- Romania

Religion
- Affiliation: Romanian Greek-Catholic Church
- Region: Sălaj County
- Rite: Greek-Catholic
- Ecclesiastical or organizational status: parish church
- Year consecrated: 1780

Location
- Location: Camăr
- Municipality: Camăr
- State: Romania
- Interactive map of Wooden Church, Camăr
- Coordinates: 47.29167°N 22.60333°E

The Wooden Church (Romanian: Biserica de lemn Sfinţii Arhangheli din Camăr) is a Greek-Catholic church in Camăr, Romania, built in 1780.

== Bibliography ==
- Cristache-Panait, Ioana (22 August 1978). „Biserica Sf. Arhangheli Mihail și Gavril din Camăr”. Monumente istorice bisericești din Eparhia Ortodoxă Română a Oradei. Biserici de lemn: 279–283, Oradea.
- Studii regionale Cristache-Panait, Ioana (22 August 1971). „Bisericile de lemn din Sălaj”. Buletinul Monumentelor Istorice 1971 (1): 31–40.
- Ghergariu, Leontin (22 August 1973). „Meșterii construcțiilor monumentale de lemn din Sălaj”. AMET 1971-73: 255–273, Cluj.
- Ghergariu, Leontin (22 August 1976). „Biserici de lemn din Sălaj”. mss în Arhivele Naționale din Zalău, colecția personală Leontin Ghergariu (actul 11 din 1976).
- Godea, Ioan (22 August 1996). Biserici de lemn din România (nord-vestul Transilvaniei). București: Editura Meridiane. ISBN 973-33-0315-1
