= The Church of Jesus Christ of Latter-day Saints in Romania =

Christian religious group

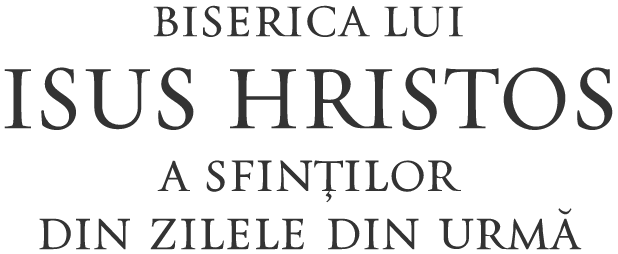
- Logo in Romanian

- Area: Europe Central
- Members: 3,127 (2025)
- Districts: 1
- Branches: 15
- Missions: 1
- FamilySearch Centers: 3

The Church of Jesus Christ of Latter-day Saints in Romania refers to the Church of Jesus Christ of Latter-day Saints (LDS Church) and its members in Romania. A small branch was formed in Bucharest in 1991. As of 2025, there were 3,127 members in fifteen congregations.

== History ==
Membership in Romania
Year	Membership
1991	99
1995*	600
1999	1,545
2004	2,302
2009	2,800
2014	2,993
2019	3,064
2024	3,029
2025	3,127
*Membership was published as a rounded number.

In 1841, on a trip to Palestine, Orson Hyde, a member of the church's Quorum of the Twelve, traveled along the Danube River between Vienna, Austria, and Galați, Romania.

In 1899, Latter-day Saint missionary Mischa Markow preached in Bucharest where several people joined the church. He was jailed for preaching and later banished from the city. He then traveled to additional cities, such as Timişoara and Braşov, where branches were organized. In January 1904, Hugh J. Cannon, president of the church's German Mission, created the Austro-Hungarian Conference, which included the branches in Temesvar, Brasso, and Vienna, Austria. Members met for several decades following his initial proselytism efforts. Between 1903 and 1913, Brasov had thirty convert baptisms, and forty-eight missionaries served in the city. On March 5, 1913, the conference was closed and missionaries were removed from the area. Some contact was made to members between World War I and prior to the star of World War II, but missionary work did not resume until 1990.

In October 1987, Russell M. Nelson, of the Quorum of the Twelve, and Hans B. Ringger, of the seventy, visited Bucharest to talk with government officials about the potential of sending humanitarian missionaries in Romania. They returned again in 1990 to make plans for humanitarian relief. While there, the group visited Cismigiu Park, where Nelson blessed and dedicated the country. The first eight humanitarian missionaries arrived on September 2, 1990. The first proselyting missionaries were young males that arrived in December 1990. The first female proselyting missionaries arrived October 1991.

Romania's first branch was organized on July 28, 1991 in Bucharest with Octavian Vasilescu as president. Another branch was organized in Ploiesti on February 15, 1993. The church obtained missionary visas and gained legal standing through the Liahona Association that was registered with the government in 1993. In early 1995, two districts were organized in Romania. The church's seminary and institute classes began in 1996. The Romanian translation of the Book of Mormon, done with assistance of native Romanians, was released in December 1998. By 2000, there were branches in Constanța, Piteşti, Ploieşti, Arad, Timişoara, Cluj-Napoca, Oradea, Sibiu, Bacău, Braşov, Galați, and Iaşi. The first two church-owned meetinghouses were dedicated in May 2000 and were located in Bucharest and Ploiesti. Romania became part of the church's Europe Central Area in 2000. In early 2001, young Romanian Latter-day Saints gathered for a countrywide youth conference for the first time. The first young women camp was held in 2009. In early 2010, two missionaries died by natural gas asphyxiation in their apartment while sleeping. In 2010, only about six Romanian members had received their patriarchal blessings, as there are no patriarchs in the country because no stakes were organized. In October 2018, Quentin L. Cook visited Romania where he addressed the new home-centered, church-supported gospel learning program.

The LDS Church has digitized the entire Romanian census, making it easier for family history.

=== Humanitarian efforts ===
Starting in 1990 members in Europe quickly answered the call for aid and assistance to Romania’s disadvantaged by organizing teams of medical professionals composed of members from several nations. Needed supplies were also donated that were funded by member donations.

Starting on September 2, 1990, the church started providing humanitarian support by sending missionaries. At the end of Nicolae Ceausescu's reign, about 25,000 children were warehoused in underfunded state-run orphanages. The missionaries worked in orphanages and institutions for disabled people. Included in this was organizing the Special Olympics, Romania's first, for disabled children in June 1991. In 1990, members in California sent quilts to needy orphanages in Romania. Assistance to orphanages continued in the 2000s, and there was an increase in specialized development projects. In 2000, members in Washington state sent bedding materials to an orphanage in Iasi, Romania. In 2003, the church assisted disabled people by coordinating with members and local medical professionals fitting and allocating prosthetic devices. In 2010, the church donated Braille writers to a school for blind children.

During the fall of the communist government, the University Library in Bucharest burned. In August 1991, retired Brigham Young University professor George S. Barrus and Russell M. Nelson facilitated a book drive for the library, which collected over 40,000 books. This was the single largest book donation from the United States.

The church offered humanitarian assistance following severe flooding along the Danube River in 2006. In 2014, Latter-day Saints participated in efforts with the Podul Dragostei Foundation to rebuild and then donate computers to foster children in Romania. Romanian members alo reached out to others during the 2015 refugee crisis. By 2017, the church had conducted a total of 300 humanitarian and development projects in Romania since 1985.

== Districts and Congregations ==
LDS Church Locations as of February 2023
Orange = district center and meetinghouse
Purple = meetinghouse
(FHC) = family history center

As of December 2025, Romania had the following districts and congregations:

Brașov Romania District

- Arad Branch
- Bacău Branch
- Braşov Branch
- Cluj-Napoca Branch
- Constanta Branch
- Craiova Branch
- Galati Branch
- Iaşi Branch
- Mihai Bravu Branch
- Oradea Branch
- Panduri Branch
- Piteşti Branch
- Ploieşti Branch
- Sibiu Branch
- Timişoara Branch

Congregations in a district are called branches, regardless of their size.

== Missions ==
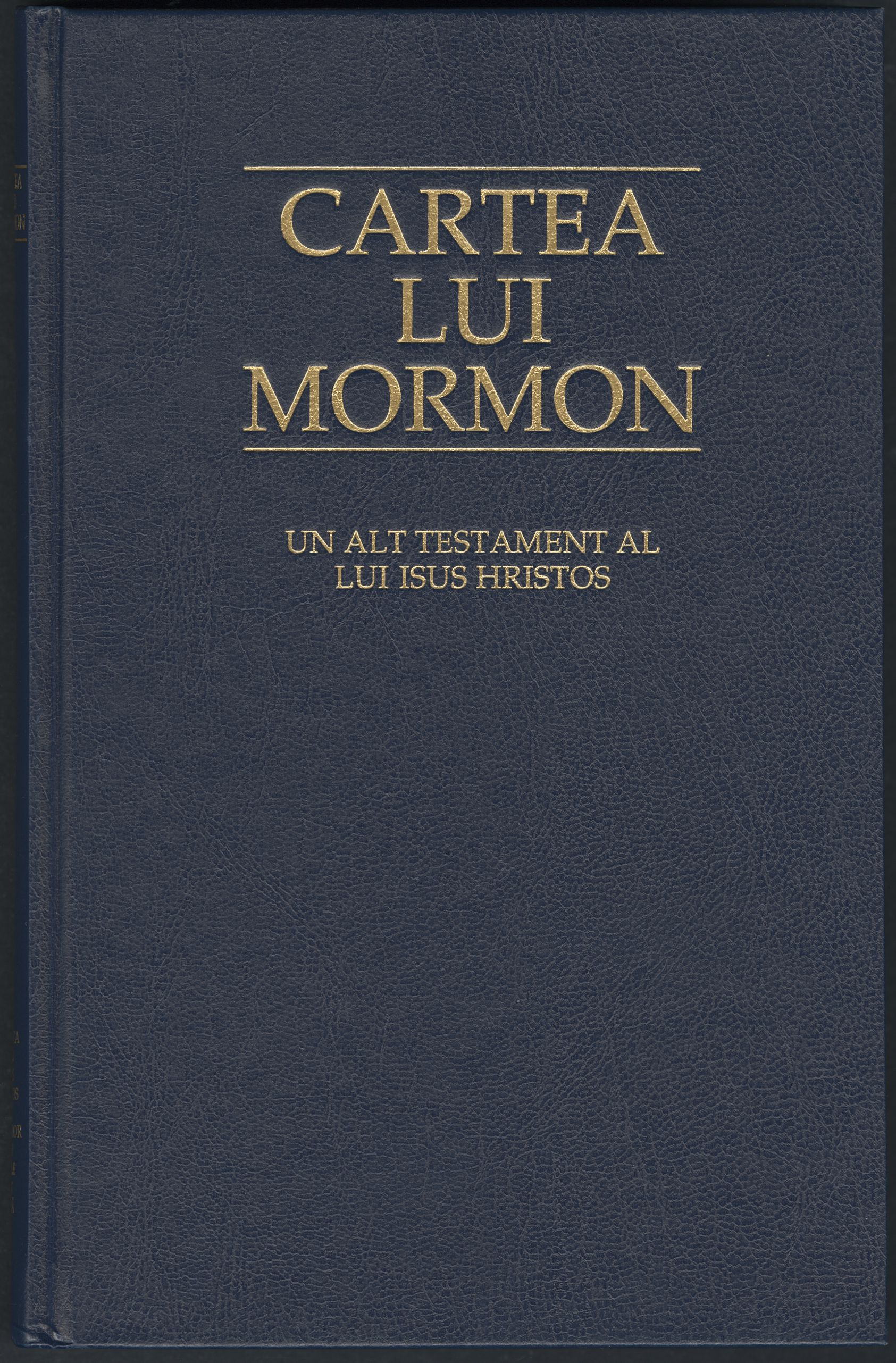
The Book of Mormon in Romanian.

After the LDS Church gained official recognition in Romania in 1990, the country was part of the Austria Vienna East Mission. This mission was discontinued in 1992 and missionaries were then assigned to the Hungary Budapest Mission until July 1, 1993, when the Romania Bucharest Mission was organized with John R. Morrey as president. This mission also administered church work in Moldova, and was eventually renamed the Romania/Moldova Mission. On July 1, 2018, the Romania/Moldova Mission was merged with the Hungary Budapest Mission and renamed the Hungary/Romania mission. Responsibility for mission work in Moldova was then transferred to the Kyiv Ukraine Mission.

In July 2023, the Romania Bucharest Mission was recreated.

== Temples ==
As of 2026, the church does not have a temple in Romania. As of 2026, members are in the Rome Italy Temple district. The Budapest Hungary Temple, which is expected to serve Latter-day Saints in Romania, was announced on April 7, 2019, by Russell M. Nelson, who was then serving as the church's president.

== See also ==
- Religion in Romania
