= Pentecostal Union of Romania =

Romanian church

Apostolic Church of God
- Biserica lui Dumnezeu Apostolică
- Type: Western Christianity
- Classification: Protestant
- Orientation: Evangelical, Charismatic
- Scripture: Bible
- Theology: Holiness Pentecostalism
- Polity: Congregationalist
- President: Filip Ioan
- Associations: Romanian Evangelical Alliance; Church of God
- Region: Romania
- Language: Romanian, Romani
- Liturgy: Contemporary
- Headquarters: Str. Carol Davila nr. 81, Sector 5, Bucharest
- Origin: 10 September 1922; Păuliș, Arad County
- Recognition: 1950
- Separations: Assemblies of God (Romania) (1996)
- Congregations: 1,343
- Members: 404,307 (in 2022)
- Pastors: 354
- Secondary schools: 3
- Tertiary institutions: 1
- Other name: Pentecostal Union of Romania
- Publications: Cuvântul Adevărului
- Official website: cultulpenticostal.ro

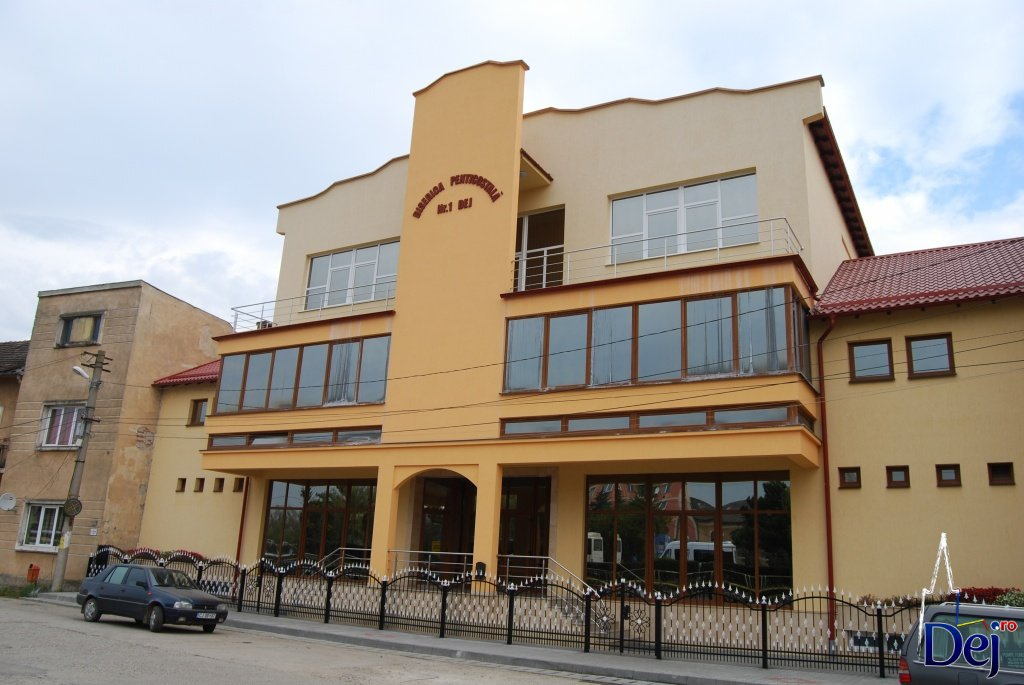
A Pentecostal church in Dej.

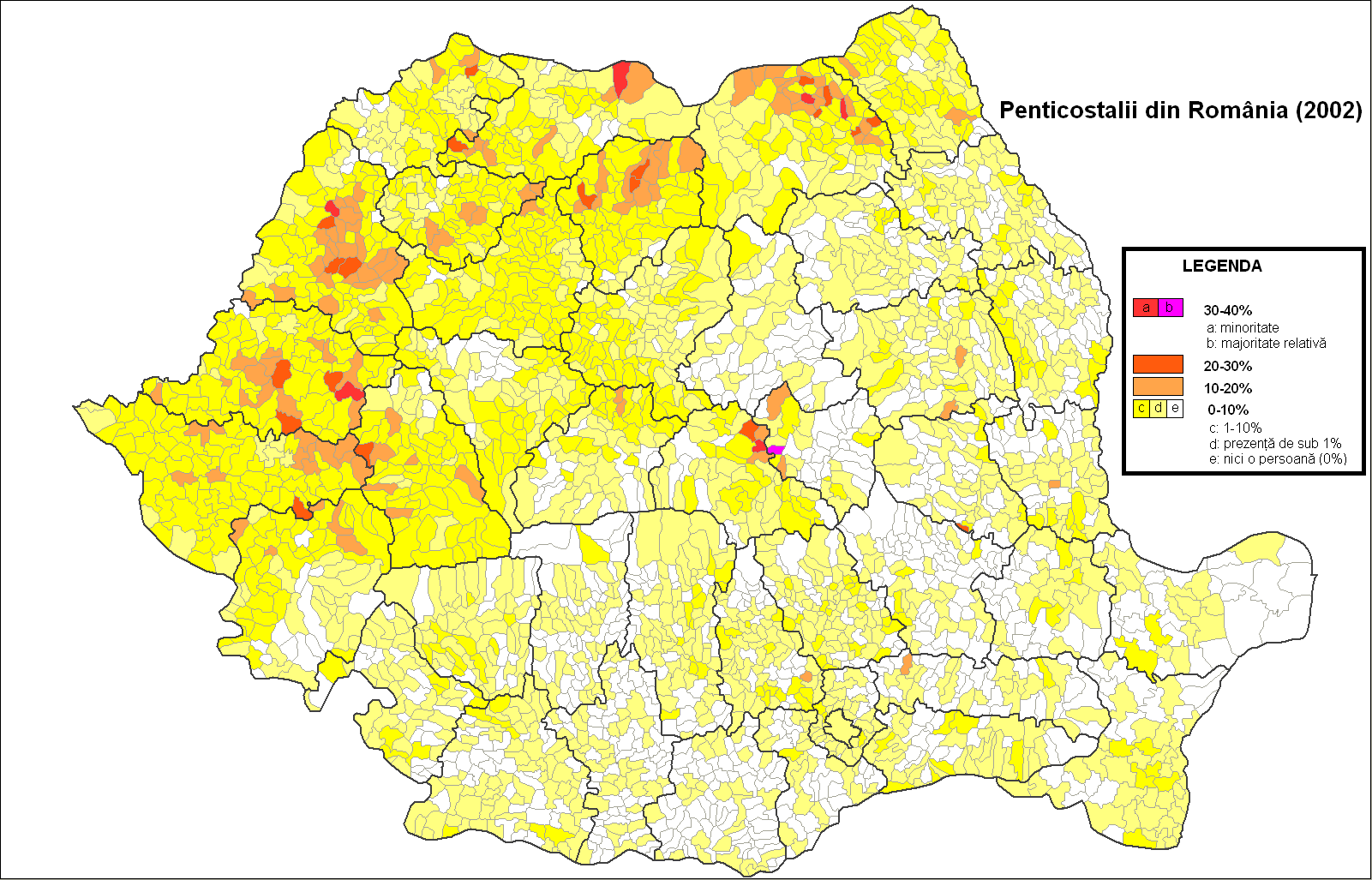
Pentecostals in Romania by municipality (2002 census)

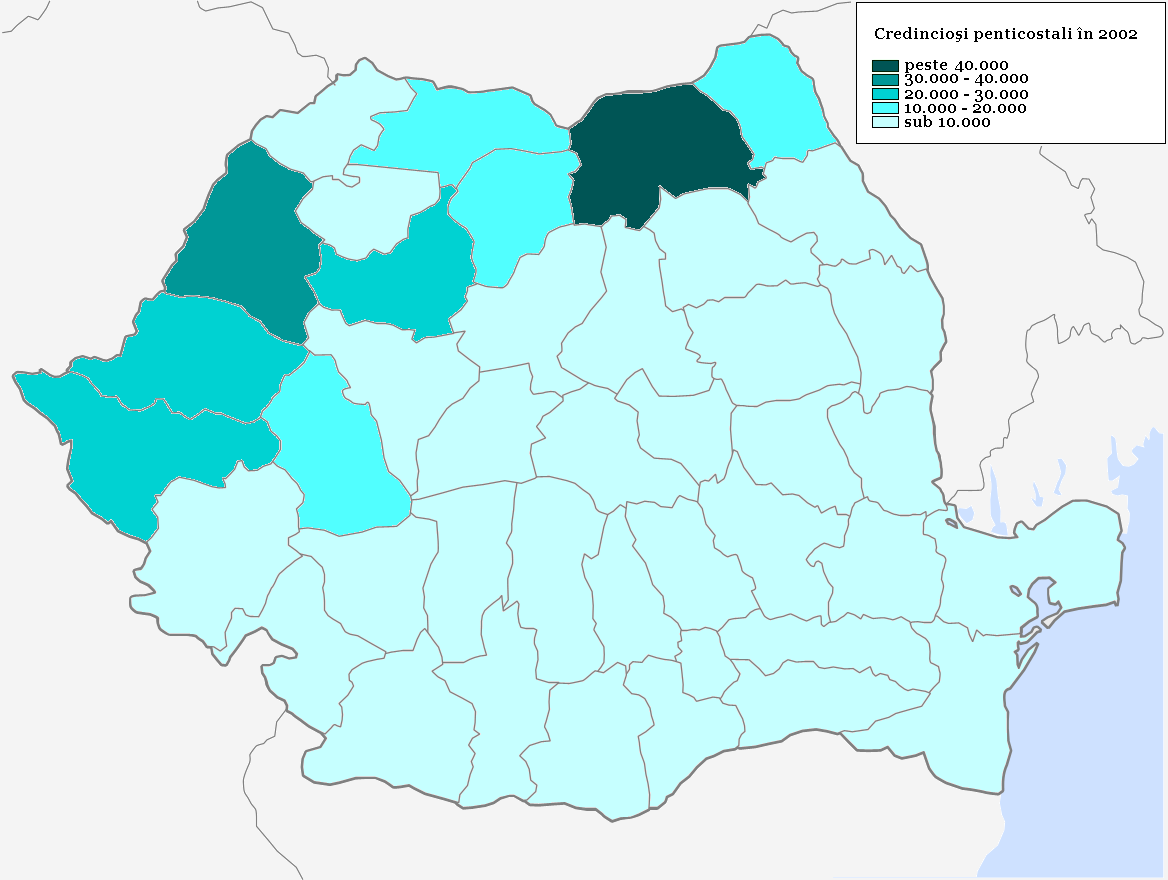
Pentecostals in Romania, absolute numbers (2002 census)

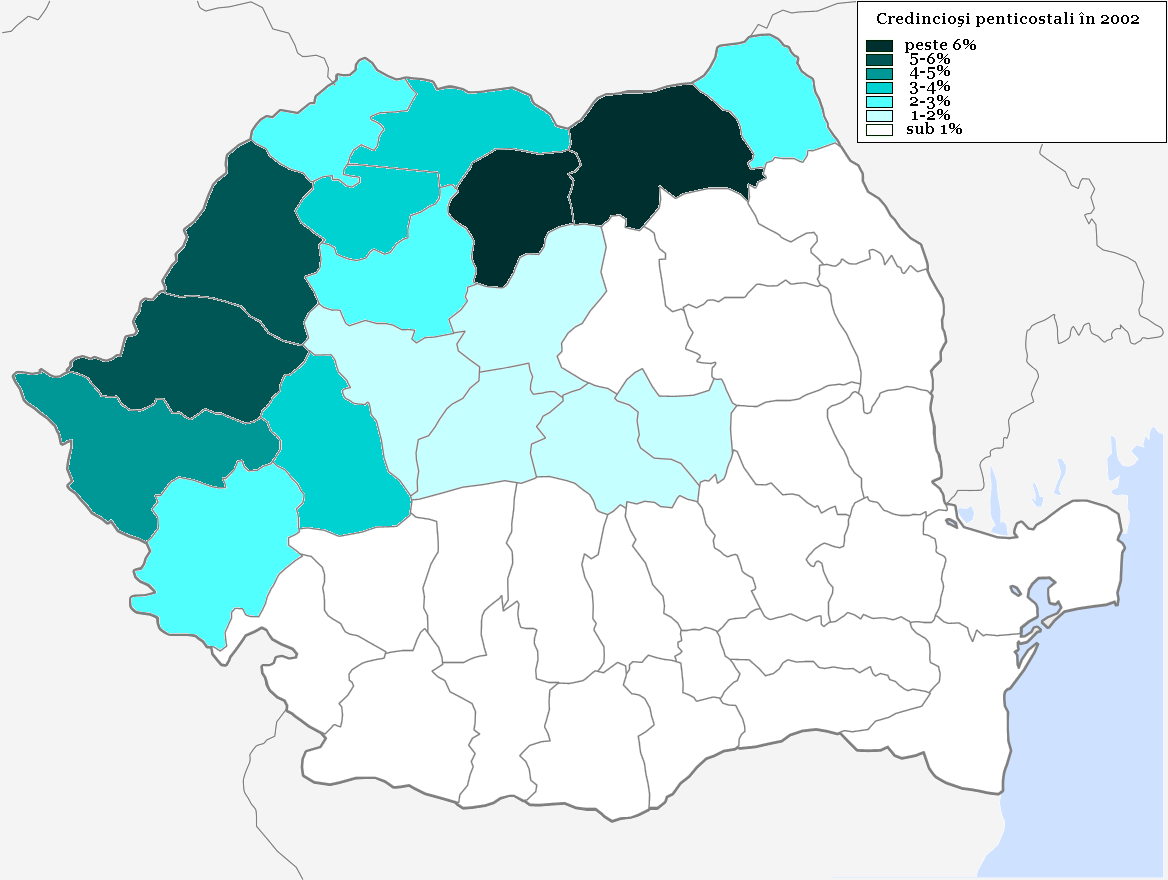
Pentecostals in Romania by percentage (2002 census)

The Pentecostal Union of Romania (Romanian: Uniunea Penticostală din România) or the Apostolic Church of God (Romanian: Biserica lui Dumnezeu Apostolică) is Romania's fourth-largest religious body and one of its eighteen officially recognised religious denominations. At the 2021 census, some 404,000 Romanians declared themselves to be Pentecostals (2.1% of the population). Ethnically, as of 2002, they were 85.2% Romanians, 10.6% Roma, 1.9% Ukrainians, 1.8% Hungarians and 0.5% belonged to other groups. They have 1,343 churches, 7,879 affiliates and 354 pastors, along with strong lay leadership. The denomination originates in the early 1920s and, headed by a central leadership, is divided into nine regional communities: Arad, Braşov, Bucharest, Cluj-Napoca, Constanţa, Oradea, Oltenia-Argeş (Craiova), Maramureş-Sătmar (Baia Mare) and Suceava. Membership is concentrated in Crişana, Banat and northern Moldavia.

== History ==
Pentecostalism was introduced to Romania in 1922 by Gheorghe Bradin, who set up a thirty-member church in Păuliş, Arad County after living in the United States since before 1910; the new movement responded to a deep concern for spiritual renewal following the trauma of World War I. The church grew rapidly and it was declared illegal in 1923, presumably due to internal divisions within the church regarding its basic convictions, shared only by a few "initiated" individuals. Still, growth continued, but appeals for official status were denied in 1924 and 1929. During this time, a significant number of Pentecostal churches identified as Baptist in order to be registered with an official religious organisation as specified by the 1928 Law on Cults.

In 1940 the Antonescu regime imprisoned a large number of Pentecostals and Baptists, even planning to send them to concentration camps in Transnistria; the church was outlawed from 1942 until after the Coup of 1944. It received provisional recognition in 1946 and was finally granted official state recognition in 1950, at which point membership stood at 36,000. A merger took place among at least three different groups, one of which practiced ritual foot washing. The group held its first nationwide congress in July 1951 and moved its main administrative offices to Bucharest in 1954. Bradin was its first president, succeeded after his death in 1962 by Pavel Bochian. Largely a rural phenomenon until the 1950s, it now has an established presence in cities as well, with about a 60%-40% rural-urban split in 2002. A seminary was opened in 1976.

During the Communist period (1947-89), Pentecostal leaders were models of cautious discretion in their relationship with the state. Bochian spoke eloquently at home and abroad about the accomplishments of President Ceauşescu and the freedom his church enjoyed. He took part in the 50th Interconfessional Theological Conference at Bucharest in 1987 and was the only neo-Protestant quoted by the international press. He declared that his country had become "more beautiful and stronger" each year, and expressed special gratitude to the state for the pastoral programme and the publications the churches were allowed to have. He called particular attention to the cross-cultural appeal of his church (generally lacking in more established bodies), noting that services were conducted in Hungarian, German, Slovak and Ukrainian in addition to the Romanian language of the majority. At the close of his address, he praised Ceauşescu's "indefatigable work" for global peace. During the 1968 invasion of Czechoslovakia, when Ceauşescu feared Romania would be invaded next, an official relayed to him that a prophecy had been made by a Pentecostal believer in Vicovu de Sus to the effect that the country's borders were protected by angels.

The church strove to transform its members to become model socialist citizens of industry and integrity; while some Pentecostal views clearly perplexed state authorities, they found within these communities signs of the moral qualities and ethnic reconciliation needed in Romanian society. By the 1980s, the church was anxious for better relations with other religious groups, particularly the dominant Romanian Orthodox Church from which it had long been estranged, and the Baptists, severe critics of their focus on glossolalia. Periodic reports continued of Pentecostal believers' difficulties over the smuggling of Bibles, holding unapproved Bible classes or permitting insistent American missionaries to speak at services without approval. In 1974, Pentecostal activist Vasile Rascol was sentenced to two years' imprisonment for illegal distribution of Romanian-language religious literature printed abroad, including translations of the Bible and The Pilgrim's Progress. Overall, however, the church did not give state authorities as much trouble as did the Baptist church; its leaders vigorously sought to promote their views and develop their communities within the context of the 1948 Law of Cults and the interpretations provided by the Department of Cults. By the end of Ceauşescu's rule, estimates place membership at over 250,000 in about 1,200 registered churches, with a further 300 awaiting authorisation and perhaps greater numbers that had not applied for official status.

Since the Romanian Revolution of 1989, the church has been represented at European and world Pentecostal conferences, and their leaders have visited various Pentecostal churches abroad. In particular, it has close relationships with the Cleveland Church of God and the Assemblies of God. Its leaders have made frequent trips to the United States, where the Romanian Pentecostal Church has seen strong growth, due in large measure to a steady stream of immigrants. In Romania, the real strength of the movement is subject to some dispute: some sources suggest 450,000 or over 800,000 adherents, with church authorities claiming undercounting by hostile or careless census-takers. Even the census recorded a 50% jump in membership between 1992 and 2002, growth has been attributed to conversion efforts and a high birthrate among members. In 2002, 6.5% of self-declared Roma were recorded as Pentecostals, and a number of churches for Roma exist, with worship said in Romani. The church receives state subsidies but also relies on annual membership fees and donations; in addition to functions like praying and Sunday school, its activities include education, social development, social assistance (often in collaboration with NGOs), spiritual support and commercial enterprises.

The church has held congresses in 1951, 1956 and every four years since 1986. After Bochian, who retired in 1990, Emil Bulgar was president until 1994, when he was succeeded by Pavel Riviş Tipei, the present incumbent. Each congress, made up of community representatives and other church notables, elects a 21-member Church Council and a 7-member Executive Board, including the president. Pastors are trained in Bucharest at the Pentecostal Theological Institute and at the Betania Pentecostal Theological Faculty in Arad; the church also has three high school-level seminaries, two post-secondary schools, and schools for younger children. The church's first magazine, Glasul Adevărului ("The Voice of Truth"), was printed in Brăila in 1929; its name was changed to Cuvântul Adevărului ("The Word of Truth") two months later. Banned in 1937, it was revived as Buletinul Cultului Penticostal ("Newsletter of the Pentecostal Cult") in 1953 and restored to its interwar name in 1990. The church now has several other publications as well as a presence on radio, television and the Internet.

=== Demographic history ===
Year	Number of believers
1922	20
1945	15,000
1950	30,000
1956	54,000
1976	100,000
1982	150,000
1989	170,000
1992	219,151
2002	330,486
2011	367,938
2022	404,307

== Pentecostal Dissidents ==
During the Communist era, the Pentecostal Dissidents were one of the Romania's least known unofficial religious communities. They represented groups of believers scattered throughout the country, some of whom may also have belonged to the official church but who gathered in rural areas for their own Bible Studies and prayer meetings “unauthorized” by the Institutionalized Church. The official church was restrained in its public exercise of the spiritual gifts, and this attitude may have been important in bringing about extralegal inspirational meetings. The group may also have included a segment of the church that originally remained outside the union because of what it perceived as the official body's unacceptable relationship to the state. Additional concerns were similar to those openly voiced by the Baptists: difficulties in building new churches, baptism restrictions, registration of church members, evangelism and approval of pastors. They deplored what they saw as their leaders' "blind submissiveness", the "political elements" expected to be embodied in preaching, the censorship of the Buletin, the control of visits from abroad, and reports that had to be filed with the Securitate. The Dissidents maintained an extremely low profile and no accurate estimate of their strength can be made. It may have experienced considerable growth alongside the official church, attracting those who favoured more independent leadership. It very likely had close ties with Eastern European missions in Western Europe and the US that strongly supported this type of clandestine community.
