= Assemblies of God (Romania) =

- Adunările lui Dumnezeu
- Type: Western Christianity
- Classification: Protestant
- Orientation: Evangelical, Charismatic
- Scripture: Bible
- Theology: Finished Work Pentecostal
- Polity: Congregationalist
- Moderator: Ioan Ceuță
- Associations: World Assemblies of God Fellowship; Pentecostal World Fellowship
- Region: Romania
- Language: Romanian
- Liturgy: Contemporary
- Headquarters: Str. Răsăritului nr. 59, Sector 6, Bucharest
- Origin: 4 June 1996; Bucharest
- Recognition: 2024
- Separated from: Apostolic Church of God
- Congregations: 100
- Secondary schools: Romanian-Finnish High School
- Official website: aog.ro

The Assemblies of God (Romanian: Adunările lui Dumnezeu) is a pentecostal Christian denomination in Romania.

== History ==
The church has its origins in the 1920s with Assemblies of God USA missionaries from the United States coming to Romania to spread the Gospel. The Romanian organization was first known as Christians Baptised with the Holy Spirit (Romanian: Creștinii botezați cu Duhul Sfânt) and was recognized as a religious association. In 1950 the communist government dissolved all particular pentecostal organizations and forced them to merge into a single body known as the Apostolic Church of God. In 1980 the Apostolic Church cut all ties with the World Assemblies of God Fellowship. Following the Romanian Revolution, in 1996, the church separated itself from the Apostolic Church and became a distinct organization affiliated with the World Assemblies of God Fellowship.

The church has applied for an official recognition from the state. which was granted in 2024.
