= Convention of the Hungarian Baptist Churches of Romania =

- Romániai Magyar Baptista Gyülekezetek Szövetsége (hu); Convenţia Bisericilor Creştine Baptiste Maghiare (ro)
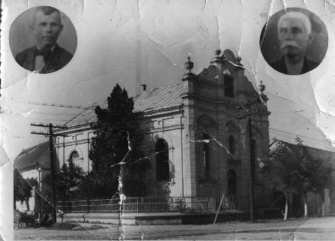
- The Baptist Church in Salonta
- Abbreviation: RMBGS
- Classification: Evangelical Christianity
- Scripture: Bible
- Theology: Baptist
- Polity: Congregationalist
- President: Felix Pardi
- Part of: Baptist Union of Romania
- Associations: European Baptist Federation; Baptist World Alliance
- Region: Romania
- Language: Hungarian
- Headquarters: Str. General Henri Mathias Berthelot, Oradea
- Origin: 1920
- Merged into: Baptist Union of Romania (1922)
- Congregations: 253
- Members: 8.321
- Official website: rmbgysz.ro

The Convention of the Hungarian Baptist Churches of Romania (Hungarian: Romániai Magyar Baptista Gyülekezetek Szövetsége; Romanian: Convenţia Bisericilor Creştine Baptiste Maghiare) is a Baptist Christian association of Hungarian churches in Romania within the larger Baptist Union of Romania, united for promoting cooperative ministry. The convention operates as a "sister" denomination to the Baptist Union of Romania and is a member of the European Baptist Federation and the Baptist World Alliance.

== History ==
In the 1870s Anton Novak, an Ethnic German colporteur of the British and Foreign Bible Society, began to meet and study the Scriptures with a group of Reformed Christians in Transylvania. In 1875, Heinrich Meyer baptized eight of them and formed them into a church in Salonta Mare. This was the first Baptist church in Transylvania.

The Baptist Union of Romania was formed in 1920, but Saxons, Hungarians, and Rusyn-Ukrainians maintained associations to promote their own interests. The Recognized Hungarian Baptist Union of Romania was founded at Salonta in October 1920. The Unrecognized Hungarian Baptist Union of Romania was formed around the same time in Nuşfalău. In 1922, the Recognized Hungarian Baptist Union associated with the Baptist Union of Romania as a department within it, and also joined the Baptist World Alliance. The two Hungarian Baptist groups united to become the Hungarian Baptist Convention of Romania in 1935.

Government instability and change brought varying challenges to the Baptists of Romania, especially from 1955 to 1989, under the Communist regime. During this time believers were harassed, churches closed, ministers threatened, and educational work prohibited. In 1948, the Hungarian Baptist Convention was closed. The Union of the Hungarian Baptist Churches of Romania was organized in Cluj-Napoca on February 3, 1990. In 1996, the name "Union" was changed to "Convention".

According to a census published by the association in 2023, it claimed 8,321 members in 253 churches.
