= Christian Evangelical Church of Romania =

Plymouth Brethren Protestant church denomination

- Biserica Creștină după Evanghelie din România
- Abbreviation: BCER
- Type: Western Christianity
- Classification: Protestant
- Orientation: Plymouth Brethren (Open)
- Scripture: Bible
- Theology: Dispensationalist theology
- Polity: Congregationalist
- Moderator: Virgil Achihai
- Associations: Romanian Evangelical Alliance
- Region: Romania
- Language: Romanian
- Headquarters: Șos. Andronache nr. 60 A, Sector 2, Bucharest
- Origin: 1899
- Recognition: 1946 (by the state)
- Absorbed: Christians of the Scriptures (1939)
- Separations: Evangelical Church of Romania (1989)
- Congregations: 678
- Members: 42,495 (in 2011)
- Presbyters: 724
- Tertiary institutions: 1
- Publications: Calea Credinței; Ecouri creștine
- Official website: bcev.ro

The Christian Evangelical Church of Romania (Romanian: Biserica Creştină după Evanghelie lit. 'The Christian Church according to the Gospel') is a Evangelical Protestant denomination historically and theologically linked with the Plymouth Brethren (the Open branch) and the Swiss Brethren. It is one of Romania's nineteen officially recognised religious denominations.

== History ==
Under the influence of foreign Plymouth Brethren missionaries active in Romania in the late 19th century, a group of "free Christians" was founded in Bucharest in 1899. Initially, members were foreign residents of the capital city; they were later joined by Romanian converts. Also known as "Darbyites" after John Nelson Darby, the British 19th century founder of their movement, the group was outlawed in the 1920s and was accused of spreading communist ideas. In 1933, the Romanian state recognised them as a religious association, the Christian Evangelicals. In 1939, they were compelled by the National Renaissance Front regime to merge with the Christians of the Scriptures (also known as Tudorites). The Christian Evangelical Church was thus formed, with two branches: branch I, which practised believer's baptism, and branch II, which employed infant baptism. (The difference stemmed from the tradition whence each emerged: Plymouth Brethren and Romanian Orthodox, respectively.)

Banned under the World War II era regime of dictator Ion Antonescu, in 1946, the Evangelical Christians were recognised as a religious body by the Romanian state, having once again merged with the Tudorites and a splinter group called "Christians" centred at Ploieşti. In 1950, soon after the advent of the Communist regime, the Christian Evangelicals had 600 churches; a large number of smaller ones were officially closed following a state ruling that they must have at least twenty members, but many of them probably continued to meet quietly. In the late 1970s, the group claimed to have nearly 400 churches, a number of which awaited official registration, and around 55,000 members. A number of scholars suggest a figure of 120,000, but this is likely based on Tudorite support within the Orthodox Church and also includes a considerable number who had not formally transferred their membership and thus were not listed as members. By the 1980s, there was a full-time secretary and a three-member executive committee in Bucharest, although there was a great deal of ambiguity regarding the committee's authority. The church received no state aid, supporting itself entirely from member contributions. Members also had social concerns, supporting a ninety-member leprosy community. Doctrinally, the church was closest to the Baptists, with whom it shared a pension programme. It had relationships with Brethren churches in California, Canada, Czechoslovakia, England, Germany, Hungary and Switzerland. In a display of support for their colleagues, representatives from these foreign communities attended the peace conferences allegedly sponsored by the Romanian religious communities in the 1980s.

The church had occasional difficulties with the Communist state. Its entire leadership was dismissed in 1984 for failing to exercise the required supervision over its assemblies regarding unofficial religious services. Local and regional officials of the Department of Religious Affairs viewed as responsible for allowing these unofficial gatherings to take place were also fired. Church officials were indicted for failing to expel members who had been convicted of illegal Bible distribution. The Department of Religious Affairs intervened and appointed the church's new leadership. Following the 1989 Revolution and the fall of the regime, the two branches split, ostensibly over the issue of baptism, with the second becoming the Evangelical Church of Romania.

== Beliefs and organisation ==
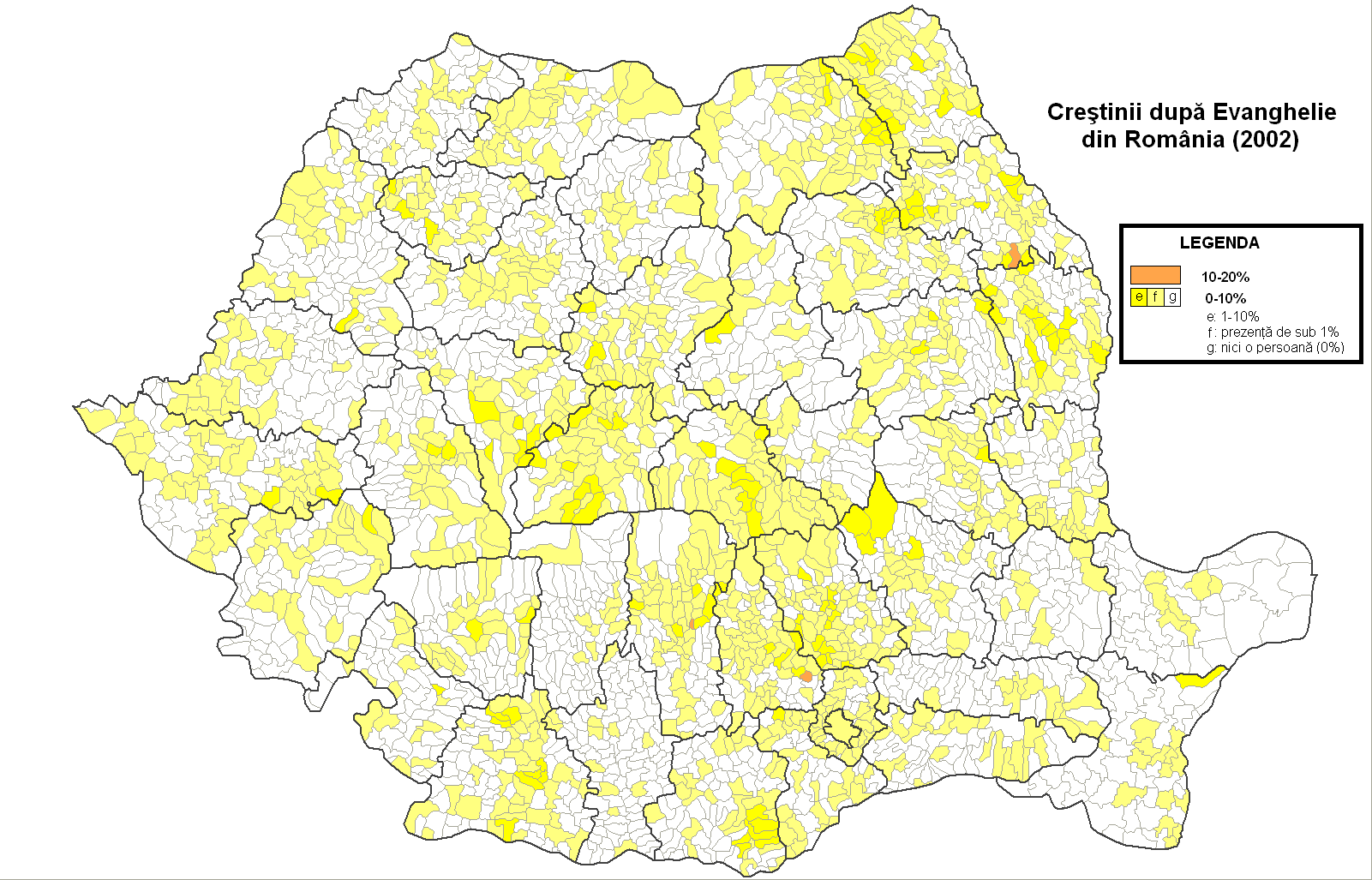
Christian Evangelicals in Romania (2002 census)

Members see as their forerunners those who thought the church had lost its ability to preach the Gospel after Constantine the Great's Edict of Milan proclaimed religious toleration for Christians in 313 AD. They thus seek a restoration of early Christianity and recognise no hierarchy other than the "headship of Christ". Their focus is on the supreme importance of inner religious life; perceiving the world to be corrupt, they look forward to the premillennial era. The church stresses a strong focus on the Bible and spontaneous divine leading in its services rather than carefully orchestrated worship. Romanian Orthodox theologian Petru Deheleanu noted doctrinal similarities to the Tudorites and the Baptists.

According to the 2011 census, the church had 42,495 members, making up 0.2% of the population; it was the country's 11th largest recognised religious body. There is no hierarchy; instead, the church is completely reliant on a lay ministry. Bible readings and expositions, prayers and fervent singing are a feature of worship services. There is a spontaneity that leads to considerable member participation, and individual churches express a strong measure of autonomy. At the local level, each church or "gathering" has at least twenty adult members and is led by two to five "elders" or presbyters, who also function as preachers of the Gospel. As of 2008, there were 678 churches and 724 preachers. In 1994, a new structure, the Zonal Community, was introduced. There are sixteen of these, led by a brethren assembly that elects a leadership committee and is itself elected by the General Conference. At the national level, the Union of Christian Evangelical Churches is led by a national brethren assembly that elects the permanent leadership, a president and two vice-presidents. The union's highest body is the quadrennial general conference, which elects the national brethren assembly and confirms the union's permanent leadership.

The church runs the university-level Timotheus Theological Institute in Bucharest and five Bible schools. Since 1949, it has edited Calea Credinţei ("The Path of Faith"), as well as the magazine Ecouri creştine ("Christian Echoes"), expressing its pietistic orientation to life. It has also published a number of theological works. Since 1990, it has run some forty associations and foundations. These involve most church members, and among their activities are teaching, orphanages, kindergartens and relief work. Also since that time, the church has re-established links with evangelical churches outside Romania, and joint projects have included evangelisation, exchanges of Biblical studies and charitable activities.
