= Union of Christian Baptist Churches in Romania =

Baptist Christian denomination in Romania

- Uniunea Bisericilor Creștin Baptiste din România
- Type: Western Christianity
- Classification: Protestant
- Orientation: Evangelical
- Scripture: Bible
- Theology: Baptist (both Arminian and Calvinist)
- Polity: Congregationalist
- President: Sorin Bădrăgan
- Regional Communities: 14
- Associations: European Baptist Federation; Baptist World Alliance; Romanian Evangelical Alliance
- Region: Romania
- Language: Romanian, Hungarian
- Headquarters: Str. Dâmbovița nr. 9-11, Sector 6, Bucharest
- Origin: 1920; Bucharest
- Recognition: 1948 (by the state)
- Absorbed: Hungarian Baptist Union of Romania (1922)
- Congregations: 1,223
- Members: 87,468
- Pastors: 700
- Secondary schools: 8
- Tertiary institutions: Emanuel University
- Seminaries: Baptist Theological Institute
- Other name: Baptist Union of Romania
- Publications: Creștinul-azi
- Official website: uniuneabaptista.ro

The Union of Christian Baptist Churches in Romania (Romanian: Uniunea Bisericilor Creștin Baptiste din România) is a Baptist Christian denomination in Romania. It is affiliated with the Romanian Evangelical Alliance, the European Baptist Federation and the Baptist World Alliance. The headquarters is in Bucharest.

== History ==
=== Origins ===
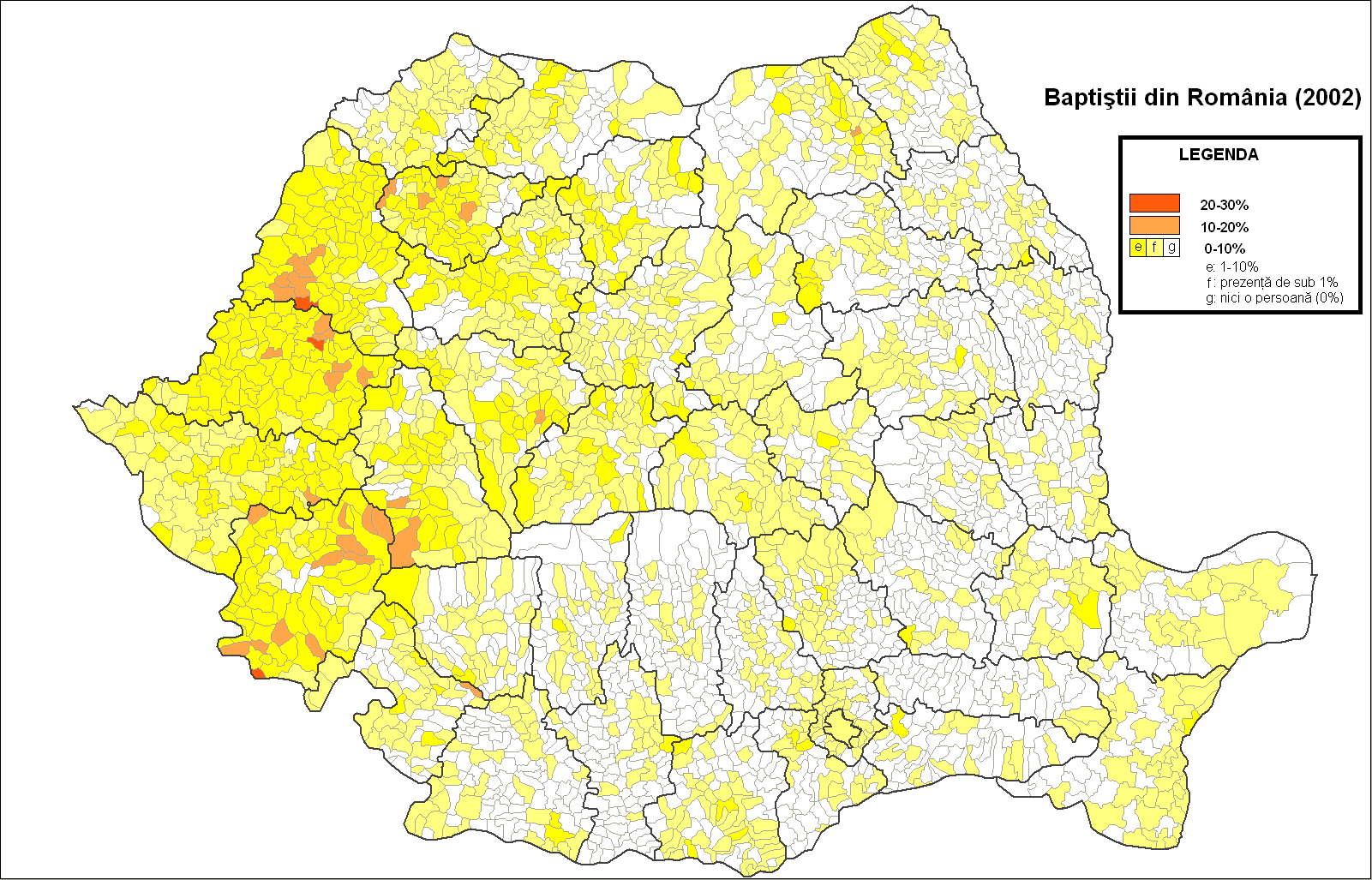
Baptists in Romania (2002 census)

The first modern-era Baptists in Romania were of German extraction. Karl Scharschmidt came to what is now southern Romania from Hungary in 1856 and settled in Bucharest. Scharschmidt, a carpenter by trade, had been baptized by Johann Gerhard Oncken in Hamburg in 1845. By 1863 enough converts had been made to form a church, and Oncken sent August Liebig to serve them as pastor. This church, the oldest Baptist church in Romania, in still in existence and meets on Popa Rusu Street (Bethany Baptist Church). Russian Baptist immigrants, mostly from the southern Ukraine, came to Dobruja around 1862 and founded a church in Cataloi in 1869. Hungarian Baptists formed a church in Transylvania in 1875.

=== Formation ===
Baptist witnesses did not enter Old Romania until the 20th century, and Orthodox opposition was strong. Nevertheless, a church was organized in Jegălia in 1909. An ethnic Romanian church was formed in Bucharest in 1912 by Constantin Adorian (1882–1954), a Romanian who had previously joined the German Baptist church in Bucharest. Adorian led in forming the Baptist Union of Romania in 1920. He met in June 1919 with Radu Tașcă, Vasile Berbecar, Teodor Sida and other baptist pastors from Crișana in Buteni to discuss the formation of a "Union of Romanian Baptist Communities". The organization was formally created in February 1920, when, after gaining approval from the authorities, a congress was held in the same location with representatives from baptist churches from all around the country.

In 1921, it founded the Bucharest Baptist Theological Institute, which would later become the Faculty of Baptist Theology, affiliated to the University of Bucharest.

In 1930, the Union had 45,000 members. Before 1944, the legal status of evangelical groups such as the Baptists was not well-defined. Due to World War II and the military dictatorship of General Antonescu, laws were passed in 1942 and 1943 dissolving all religious associations in Romania. As a consequence, Baptists could not meet, worship or evangelize. On August 31, 1944, these laws were abrogated, and the Baptists (and others) could once again engage in religious activity legally. In 1948 Baptists were officially recognized by the state as a legal cult (Note: "not to be confused with the english word cult; In romanian, cult is a generic term used by the Romanian government to describe any officially recognized religious body; English equivalent: religious denomination").

According to a census published by the association in 2025, it claimed 1,223 churches and 87,468 members. The members of the Convention of the Hungarian Baptist Churches of Romania, a subgroup of the national Baptist Union, were counted separately and are 8,321 in 253 churches, making for a total of 92,174 members and 1,900 churches.

==== Calvinist-Arminian debate ====
Historically, the baptist churches in Romania were very much influenced by calvinism. This was no surprise given the fact that the church had German roots. According to the Romanian historiographer, Alexa Popovici, early baptists had a "Calvinist inclination". There is evidence to suggest that, at some point, calvinist soteriology, including double predestination, was preached in some congregations in Transylvania. The liberal tendencies of the Reformed Church made some Hungarians switch to the baptist tradition which also contributed to the predominant calvinist view among Romanian baptists. However the church would experience a shift towards arminianism during the interwar period due to the founding of a formal seminary in collaboration with the Southern Baptist Convention and the theological influences of Edgar Young Mullins. The arminian position will remain the predominant view among Romanian baptists for much of the communist period. After the 1989 Revolution, the calvinist position would reemerge and gain popularity once again, although it would still remain a minority view.

== Relation with the state ==
The separation of church and state is a core doctrine in baptist tradition.

=== Funds ===
Out of the 19 officially recognised denominations in Romania, the Baptist Union is one of the only three which do not accept subsidies from the government for the salaries of its ministers, believing that it is the deliberate duty of every believer to financially support the activities of his church. However, the Union accepts subsidies from the local authorities for the construction or reparation of its churches when their funds are insufficient. The church also runs its own pension fund for its retired pastors.

== Schools ==
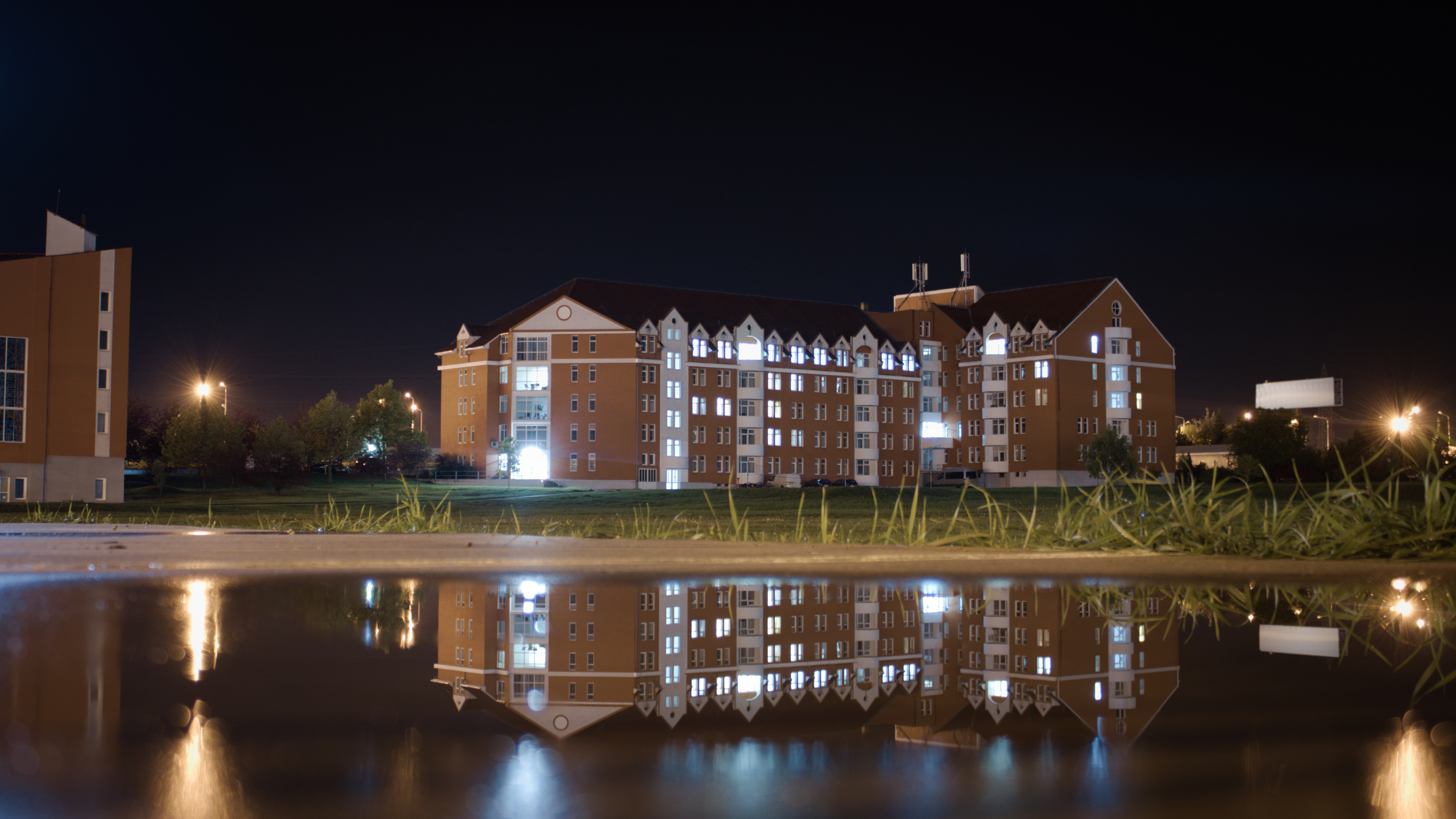
Emanuel University of Oradea in Oradea.

The Union has 8 theological high schools and 2 post-secondary non-tertiary educational institutions, as well as 2 tertiary institutions: The Baptist Theological Institute in Bucharest (accredited by the University of Bucharest) and the Emanuel University in Oradea, Bihor.

== See also ==
- Baptist beliefs
- Believers' Church
- European Baptist Federation
- Brotherhood of Independent Baptist Churches and Ministries of Ukraine
- Evangelical Baptist Union of Ukraine
- Union of Baptist Churches in Serbia
- Union of Christian Evangelical Baptist Churches of Moldova
