= List of churches in Addis Ababa =

This is list of churches located in Addis Ababa, Ethiopia.

== Orthodox Churches ==
- Entoto Mariam Church
- Holy Trinity Cathedral
- Medhane Alem Cathedral
- St. Gabriel Church
- St. George's Cathedral
- St. George Church (Eastern Orthodox)
- St. Joseph Church
- Washa Mikael Rock Hewn Church

== Protestant Churches ==
- Bethel International Church*
- Ethiopian Evangelical Church Mekane Yesus
- Holy International Church
- Kidus Raguel Church

== Catholic Churches ==
- Church of the Nativity of Mary
- Holy Savior Catholic Church
- Yeka Kidane Mehret Church

== English Speaking Churches ==
- Beza Church
- Eastridge Church Addis
- International Evangelical Church (IEC)
- Redeemer
- St Matthew's Anglican Church
