= Eastern Protestant Christianity =

Protestants of Eastern Christendom

The term Eastern Protestant Christianity (also called Eastern Reformed Christianity as well as Oriental Protestant Christianity) encompasses a range of heterogeneous Protestant Christian denominations that developed outside of the Western world from the latter half of the nineteenth century and retain certain elements of Eastern Christianity. Some of these denominations came into existence when churches originating from Western Protestant missions adopted variants of Eastern liturgy and worship adapted to Protestant doctrine, while others originated from Eastern Orthodox, Oriental Orthodox and Assyrian Church of the East groups who were inspired by the teachings of Western Protestant missionaries and adopted Protestant beliefs and practices while retaining Eastern liturgy.

All Eastern Protestant churches are in communion with similar Western Protestant churches, and are members of pan-doctrinal communions such as the Anglican Communion, World Lutheran Federation and World Communion of Reformed Churches. Due to the diverse polities, practices, liturgies and orientations within Protestantism, there is no universal communion between the various Eastern Protestant churches.

== Major branches ==
=== Malankara Mar Thoma Syrian Church ===
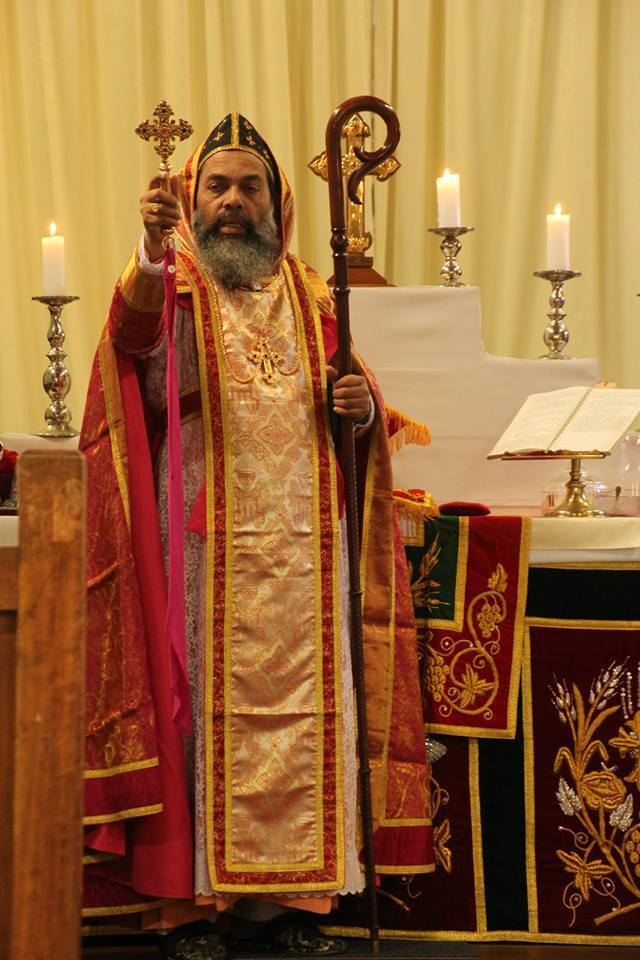
Bishop of the Malankara Mar Thoma Syrian Church in liturgical vestments

The Malankara Mar Thoma Syrian Church has its origins in a Reformation movement within the Malankara Church in South India, in the latter half of the 19th century. India was part of the British Empire at the time, while the Malankara Church is an Oriental Orthodox church, in communion with the Syriac Orthodox Patriarchate of Antioch. Concurrently, Anglican missionaries from England arrived in South India. They became teachers at the church's seminary and made the Bible available in the Malayalam language. Inspired by the teachings of the missionaries and imbibing the ideas of the European Reformation from them, a few priests under the leadership of Abraham Malpan, initiated a Reformation of the Malankara Church. Abraham Malpan also managed to get his nephew Deacon Mathew, ordained as bishop Mathews Mar Athanasius, by the Patriarch of Antioch. But many opposed the reforms. The groups for and against reforms engaged in court litigations for the church and its properties. These ended in 1889, through a verdict favoring the Patriarchal faction. Subsequently, the reformed faction became an independent church, known as the Malankara Mar Thoma Syrian Church. To date, there are 11 bishops, 1149 priests and over a million laity. While retaining many of the Syriac high church practices, the Malankara Mar Thoma Syrian Church is Reformed in its theology and doctrines. The church employs a reformed variant of the Liturgy of Saint James, with many parts in the local vernacular. The Malankara Mar Thoma Syrian Church is in full communion with the Anglican Communion and maintains friendly relations with many other churches.

=== Lutheran ===
Eastern Lutheranism refers to Lutheran churches, such as those of Ukraine and Slovenia, that use a form of the Byzantine Rite as their liturgy. It is unique in that it is based on the Eastern Christian rite used by the Eastern Orthodox Church, while incorporating theology from the Divine Service contained in the Formula Missae, the base texts for Lutheran liturgies in the West.

==== Laestadianism ====
In the far north of the Scandinavian peninsula are the Sámi people, some of whom practice a form of Lutheranism called Apostolic Lutheranism, or Laestadianism due to the efforts of Lars Levi Laestadius. However, others are Orthodox in religion. Some Apostolic Lutherans consider their movement as part of an unbroken line down from the Apostles. In Russia, Laestadians of Lutheran background cooperate with the Ingrian church, but since Laestadianism is an interdenominational movement, some are Eastern Orthodox. Eastern Orthodox Laestadians are known as Ushkovayzet.

==== Ukrainian Lutheran Church ====
The Ukrainian Lutheran Church, formerly called the Ukrainian Evangelical Church of the Augsburg Confession, is a Byzantine Rite Lutheran Church based in Ukraine. The Eastern Christian denomination consists of 25 congregations within Ukraine, serving over 2,500 members and runs Saint Sophia Ukrainian Lutheran Theological Seminary in Ternopil in Western Ukraine. The ULC is a member of the Confessional Evangelical Lutheran Conference (CELC), a worldwide organization of confessional Lutheran church bodies of the same beliefs.

=== Reformed and Presbyterian ===
==== St. Thomas Evangelical Church of India ====
The St. Thomas Evangelical Church of India (STECI) is an Evangelical, Episcopal, St. Thomas Syrian Christian denomination based in Kerala, India. It derives from a schism in the Malankara Mar Thoma Syrian Church in 1961. STECI holds that the Bible is the inspired, inerrant and infallible Word of God. Adherents believe that all that is necessary for salvation and living in righteousness is given in the Bible. The church is engaged in active evangelism. The headquarters of this church is at Tiruvalla, a town in the state of Kerala.

==== Assyrian Evangelical Church ====
The Assyrian Evangelical Church is a Middle Eastern church which attained ecclesiastical independence from the Presbyterian mission in Iran, in 1870. Its membership is composed mostly of Eastern Aramaic speaking ethnic Assyrians who were originally part of the Assyrian Church of the East and its offshoots, or the Syriac Orthodox Church. They, like other Assyrian Christians, are sometimes targets of persecution by hostile governments and neighbors.

==== Armenian Evangelical Church ====
The Armenian Evangelical Church is the product of a reform campaign from within the Armenian Apostolic Church. The reformers were influenced by the missionaries of the American Board of Commissioners for Foreign Missions, who arrived in Turkey in the early 19th century and published translated bibles for Turkish-speaking Armenians.

The reformers were led by Krikor Peshdimaljian, one of the leading intellectuals of the time. Peshdimaljian was the head of a training school for the Armenian Apostolic clergy. The school was under the auspices of the Armenian Patriarchate of Constantinople. Out of this school, emerged a society called the Pietisical Union, whose members focused more directly on the Bible and organized Bible study meetings. They began to raise questions about what they saw as conflicts between biblical truths and the traditional practices of the Armenian Apostolic Church. The Union also advocated Pietism, which they believed their church was devoid of.

The leadership of the Armenian Apostolic Church under Patriarch Matteos Chouhajian was against any reform, and excommunicated the reformists from the church. This separation led to the formation of the Armenian Evangelical Church, on July 1, 1846, in Constantinople. By 1850, the new church received the official recognition of the Ottoman government. Later, however, Armenians were forced out of Ottoman Turkey, due to the Armenian genocide. The Armenian Evangelical congregations in the Middle East are currently organized as the Union of the Armenian Evangelical Churches in the Near East.

=== Evangelical ===
==== Indian Pentecostal Church of God ====
The Indian Pentecostal Church of God is the largest indigenous Pentecostal denomination in India. It was founded in 1924, and the first united convention of these congregations was held in Ranni, Kerala, in April 1925.

IPC was officially registered as a religious society on 9 December 1935 at Eluru, Andhra Pradesh. Its administrative headquarters is located at Hebron, Kumbanad, Kerala.

Today, IPC has over 12,000 congregations worldwide, with a strong presence across India and in countries such as the United States, Canada, Australia, Europe, and the Middle East.

==== Assyrian Pentecostal Church ====
The Assyrian Pentecostal Church is a Pentecostal Christian denomination which originated in the 1940s among the Assyrian people of Iran and spread among ethnic Assyrians in Iraq, Turkey and Syria. They are native speakers of the Assyrian Neo-Aramaic language, and also use it as their liturgical language. They use the Syriac Aramaic Bible. Most of the members of this denomination were originally part of the Assyrian Church of the East and its offshoots, or the Syriac Orthodox Church. The Assyrian Pentecostal Church is affiliated with the Assemblies of God Church. There have been reported instances of persecution against them as well.

==== Believers Eastern Church ====
The Believers Eastern Church (formerly Believers Church) is a Christian denomination with roots in Pentecostalism, based in Kerala, India. It exists as a part of the Gospel for Asia. In 2003, this church acquired episcopacy, by getting Indian Anglican bishops to ordain its founder K. P. Yohannan as a bishop. Henceforth this denomination adopted several elements of Eastern Christian worship and practices like the use of holy oils for anointing, while keeping the principle of sola scriptura. Its name was officially changed to Believers Eastern Church in 2017, so as to "better express its roots in the ancient and orthodox faith".

==== Evangelical Church of Romania ====
The Evangelical Church of Romania (Romanian: Biserica Evanghelică Română) is one of Romania's eighteen officially recognised religious denominations. The church originated between 1920 and 1924, through the work of the young Romanian Orthodox theologians Dumitru Cornilescu and Tudor Popescu.

Deacon Cornilescu was motivated to translate the Bible into modern Romanian, by Princess Calimachi of Moldavia. While translating the Epistle to the Romans, Cornilescu became interested in the concept of personal salvation. By the time he completed the translation, he had become staunchly evangelical. Afterwards, Cornilescu served as a deacon under Fr. Tudor Popescu, at the Cuibul cu barză Church in Bucharest. After some time, Popescu converted to evangelicalism, due to Cornilescu's influence. Both of them began to preach salvation by personal faith in Christ. Gradually, they gained a significant following, including priests from the Romanian Orthodox Church. Soon other evangelical traits, such as singing and congregational participation, began to manifest in this group. They called into question many Orthodox practices, which they perceived to be unbiblical. Tudor Popescu has been called the Romanian Martin Luther, for his attempts to reform the Romanian Orthodox Church.

Due to deviations from Eastern Orthodox doctrines, the Romanian Orthodox Church defrocked Fr. Tudor Popescu. Dumitru Cornilescu was forced to leave the country. But Popescu and his followers (originally called Tudorists), established their own Church; the Evangelical Church of Romania.

==== Evangelical Orthodox Church ====
The Evangelical Orthodox Church is a Christian denomination which blends Evangelical Protestantism with features of Eastern Orthodoxy. It started off in 1973 as a network of house churches established by Campus Crusade for Christ missionaries in the United States. The founders Peter E. Gillquist, Jack Sparks, Jon Braun, and J.R. Ballew wanted to restore Christianity to its primitive form based on the writings of the early Church Fathers. So they stood in a circle and self-ordained each other, creating an entity called the New Covenant Apostolic Order (NCAO). Their own interpretations of church history led to the adoption of a somewhat liturgical form of worship and induced a need for apostolic succession. In 1977 the first contact with the Eastern Orthodox Church was initiated through Orthodox seminarian Fr. John Bartke. In 1979 the Evangelical Orthodox Church (EOC) was organized. The EOC pursued various avenues to obtain episcopacy, including a visit to the Patriarch of Constantinople, but to no avail. At last they met Patriarch Ignatius IV of Antioch, during his historic visit to Los Angeles, which proved successful. This meeting was arranged by Fr. John Bartke, who later served as the primary intermediary between the EOC and the Antiochian Orthodox Archdiocese, and also hosted the initial set of chrismations and ordinations for the EOC at St. Michael's Church in Van Nuys, California. Unable to completely reconcile Evangelicalism and Orthodoxy, many EOC members formally joined the Antiochian Orthodox Christian Archdiocese of North America in 1987. Some others joined the Orthodox Church in America. The rest remained independent and continue as the Evangelical Orthodox Church.

==== P'ent'ay ====
P'ent'ay is an Amharic and Tigrinya language term for evangelical Christians in Ethiopia and Eritrea. This movement has been influenced by the mainstream Oriental Orthodox Christianity of these countries as well as Pentecostalism. As Protestantism is relatively new in Ethiopia, most P'ent'ay are ex-Orthodox Christians. Many of these groups describe their religious practices as culturally Orthodox, but Protestant by doctrine. They boast approximately 16,500,000 members. The P'ent'ay denominations may constitute as much as 19% of the population of Ethiopia, while being a small minority in Eritrea.

== List of churches ==
- Malankara Mar Thoma Syrian Church
- Armenian Evangelical Church
- Assyrian Evangelical Church
- Assyrian Pentecostal Church
- Believers Eastern Church of India
- Indian Pentecostal Church of God
- Kerala Brethren
- Eastern Rite Community in Germany and the Czech Republic
- Evangelical Baptist Church of Georgia
- Evangelical Church of Egypt (Synod of the Nile)
- Evangelical Church of Romania
- Evangelical Church of the Augsburg Confession in Slovenia
- St. Valentine's Lutheran Fellowship of the Grand Canyon Synod (ELCA).
- Evangelical Orthodox Church
- Kosovo Protestant Evangelical Church
- Evangelical Brotherhood in Albania
- P'ent'ay - Ethiopian and Eritrean Evangelical Churches
- Evangelical Russian Church
- Society for Eastern Rite Anglicanism
- St. Thomas Evangelical Church of India
- Ukrainian Lutheran Church

== See also ==
- Army of the Lord, an evangelical movement within the Romanian Orthodox Church
- Zoë movement, sometimes regarded as a crypto-Protestant movement in the Greek church
- Spiritual Christianity, the group of Russian movements (Doukhobors, Molokans, and Spiritual Christian Teetotalers—Churikovites), so-called folk Protestants; their origins are varied: some were influenced by western Protestants, others from disgust of the behavior of official Orthodox priests
