= African Pentecostalism =

Christian Movement

African Pentecostalism is the form of Pentecostalism which appropriates aspects of African Traditional Religion, such as an enchanted worldview which believes in the existence of both malevolent and benevolent spirits, and seeks redemption from the malevolent ones.

The doctrines and practices of modern Pentecostalism placed a high priority on international evangelization. The movement spread to Africa soon after the 1906 Azusa Street Revival in Los Angeles.

Currently, there are many self-governing, self-propagating, and self-supporting Pentecostal churches in Africa. They utilize the same means to evangelize that early Pentecostal churches used such as door-to-door evangelism, meetings held in homes of interested inquirers, preaching in trains, buses, on street corners and at places of public concourse, and 'tent crusades' held all over the continent. The Charismatic resurgence in the 1970s had a large impact on the growth of the church today. The faith is becoming one of the most substantial denominations of Christianity in Africa. However, the Roman Catholic Church remains the largest Christian body of Africa.

== Types of African Pentecostalism ==
There are four main types of African Pentecostalism: AICs, Classical Pentecostals, Neo-Pentecostals/Neo-Charismatics, Older Church Charismatics.

=== African Initiated/Independent churches ===
These are the first wave of African Pentecostals in Africa. They wanted a form of Christianity which was different from Western Catholic and Protestant churches. Hence, their name African Initiated or Independent Churches. Examples of AICs are Zionist (South Africa), Aladura/Awoyo (Nigeria), Abahoro(Kenya), and Sunsum Sore (Ghana).

=== Classical Pentecostals ===
These are churches with links to Western Pentecostals such as the Azusa Street Revival. Examples of classical Pentecostal cruches are the Assemblies of God, the Church of Pentecost, the Apostolic Faith Mission.

=== Neo-Pentecostals/neo-Charismatics ===
These churches include Winners' Chapel, Christ Embassy, Action Chapel, Lighthouse Chapel

=== Older Church Charismatics ===
These are the renewal movements within the Catholic and Protestant churches such as the Catholic Charismatic Renewal.

== South Africa ==
In 1908, South Africa became one of the first African countries to receive Pentecostalism. A major reason for the spread of the Pentecostal faith in South Africa was due to the Apostolic Faith Newspaper written by Seymour. The Apostolic Faith newspaper began circulating in Cape Town, South Africa and eventually resulted in the establishment of the Assemblies of God (AG) in Cape Town and Johannesburg. Azusa Street missionaries Thomas Hezmalhalch and John Lake carried Seymour's Pentecostal message to South Africa in 1908. They moved throughout South Africa and in 1913 Lake establish the Apostolic Faith Mission of South Africa (AFMSA). In 1908 Pieter Louis Le Roux established the Pentecostal Zionist movement in South Africa. The Zionist movement and other African Instituted Churches (AICs) helped spread Seymour's message even further although it is questioned if the term Pentecostalism can be applied to them. At the beginning of the twenty-first century somewhere between 10–40% of South Africa's population could be called Pentecostal but this classification varies depending on how the religion is defined. The three largest Pentecostal denominations that are present in South Africa include the Apostolic Faith Mission, the South African Assemblies of God, and the Full Gospel Church of God. In the early 1990s, there was a surge of Nigerian, Kenyan, and Ghanaian preachers in South African townships. South Africans were intrigued by these preachers, such as the Nigerian Emmanuel Eni, due to their dramatic sermons and admittance of previously being involved with dark magic. Their sermons focused on exorcisms and this dark magic. Not only were these factors appealing to South Africans, but the preachers provided them with an alternative Christian future that contained rewards not only in the afterlife, but during life on earth.

== Other Africa ==
Pentecostals make up more than 20% of the total population in Kenya, Uganda, South Sudan, Malawi, and Burundi. Pentecostalism has also grown in Rwanda following the Rwandan genocide. Pentecostalism has also grown in Tanzania and Cameroon.

== West Africa ==
Pentecostalism was also carried to West Africa. In 1914 William Wadé Harris carried the message of Pentecostalism with him throughout the Ivory Coast to Ghana. He would wear a white cassock and turban, holding a staff, Bible, and baptismal bowl while attacking the local spiritual beliefs and their leaders. As a result, villagers would bring their idols to him, where they would be burned and the people would receive a tap of confirmation. At the villages to which Harris travelled, he instructed the villagers to build a place of worship and, if there was already a Christian mission in the village, he would encourage them to seek out the missionaries. While Harris was spreading the teachings of Christianity, there were a number of healings and wonders, such as misfortunes to those who were not welcoming of Harris’ efforts and the fact that laborers were still able to work on Sundays. As rumors of Harris’ powerful demeanor and these wonders spread, masses of people flocked to him. There was an especially large following in Grand Bassam and Bingerville, as his baptisms were followed by miracles. His message converted tens of thousands of people to Christianity. It caused many Africans living on the Ivory coast to disconnect from their traditional practices, such as festivals, burial rituals, and the disappearance of huts for women during their menstrual cycle. He also dispelled ancient African sacrifices, fetishes, and dances. Missionaries from England observed how prevalent the religious differences were between the Ivory Coast and Dahomey or Togo. In 1922, Captain Paul Marty, the colonial administrator, described this distinction as a "religious fact, almost unbelievable, which has upset all the ideas we had about black societies of the Coast—so primitive, so rustic—and which with our occupation and as a consequence of it will be the most important political and social event of ten centuries of history, past, present or future of the maritime Ivory Coast." However, many villagers were not accepted by the Church because of their refusal to abandon polygamy. In 1931, the Église Harriste (Harrist Church) was created by Jomas Ahui, who was consecrated by Harris. The church has 197,515 members as of October 16, 2018. It has seven weekly services (three on Sunday) and emphasizes the teachings of Harris, such as monogamy, prayer instead of sacrifice, and the abolition of fetishes. The religion also highlights the importance cross, Bible, calabash, and baptismal bowl as religious tools. In the 1970s, independent charismatic churches began to surface in West Africa at a fast pace., specifically in Nigeria and Ghana. Eventually, these independent charismatic churches began to surface in South Africa. After the government relaxed restrictions, in regards to the movement of Black South Africans, the bigger the Black Christian community grew. These converts were known as “Born Agains” and they denounced the African-initiated churches. They connected to the preachers of their new religion and started their own churches and ministries. However, they were less successful than the charismatic churches run by white people. These churches were influenced by missions from the United States, but have an African foundation.

=== Ghana ===
Missionary Pentecostalism was introduced to Ghana during the first three decades of the 20th century. The foundation of the church was derived from the Assemblies of God and Apostolic Church in the United States and England. In Ghana, the Methodist church received over 8,000 membership requests, as well as requests for catechists in schools. Over the last 20 years, Pentecostalism has become one of the most popular forms of Christianity in Ghana. Between the years of 1987 and 1992 the church grew by about 42% as rural and urban people joined different movements of Pentecostalism. The Ghana Pentecostal Council serves the needs of 120 churches in Ghana.

=== Liberia ===
In August, 1906, Lucy Farrow, Julia Hutchins, and others arrived in Liberia, the first location in Africa to receive Pentecostal missionaries. Farrow wrote to William J. Seymour saying that God had given her the ability to speak in the Kru language and that she could therefore baptize and heal many natives. Shortly after, other missionaries from the United States joined Farrow in Africa to Pentecostal faith. In 1916, the Methodist Episcopal church noted that “Literally thousands, largely young people, have been swept in to the kingdom of God. Revivals were held and eventually the first permanent Azusa-influenced Pentecostal mission in Africa was founded. However, some American missionaries reported that some areas of Africa already developed manifestations of the Holy Spirit prior to 1906. Many indigenous churches were established prior to foreign missionaries on the foundation of the power of the Holy Spirit. In Congo Brazzaville, Ghana, and Nigeria movements that could be classified as Pentecostal had all taken on different African names.

=== Nigeria ===
Pentecostalism began in Nigeria during the early twentieth century as a renewal movement to the prominent mission churches in Africa. At first, the growth of Pentecostalism was due to the efforts to break free from Western missionary control. This resulted in the popularity of many AICs (African-initiated churches), which focused on prophecy and healing. The second wave of Pentecostalism arose as a result of the Nigerian Civil War among students and young people who belonged to Pentecostal churches, mainline churches, and the Scripture Union. Pentecostal churches, especially large charismatic churches have become popular in Nigeria, competing for membership with Catholic churches and other Christian confessions. A growing number of Nigerian students shrive Catholicism and Pentecostalism at the same time. Nigeria has the largest population of Pentecostals in Africa and, in a study from 2006, three out of ten Nigerians identify as either Pentecostal of Charismatic. Since Islam is prevalent in Nigeria, there exists a tension between the Northern Hausa-Fulani, who are predominantly Muslim, the Eastern Igbo, who are predominantly Christian, and the Western Yoruba, whose population is divided among the two religions. Nonetheless, the Christian population has continued to grow in Nigeria. For example, the Redeemed Church of God, which was founded in Nigeria, has over 14,000 branches worldwide and has branches in over 140 nations.

== Ethiopia ==
Anna-Liisa and Sanfrid Mattson, Pentecostal missionaries from Finland, brought Pentecostalism to Ethiopia in 1951. Pentecostalism in Ethiopia continued to develop and eventually the Full Gospel Believer's Church (FBGC) was created in 1967. Approximately 2 million people claim to be Pentecostal in Ethiopia today.

== Zambia ==
Pentecostalism in Zambia gained a following within the rich, white miners. Then, Pentecostal missions started to spread Christianity in Zambia, the most notable mission being the Pentecostal Assemblies of God. Now known as the Pentecostal Assemblies of God in Zambia, this denomination is the largest of its kind in Zambia with over 1,200 branches. Bread of Life Church International in Lusaka is Zambia’s largest single congregation with about 10,000 members.
