= Bible translations into Romanian =

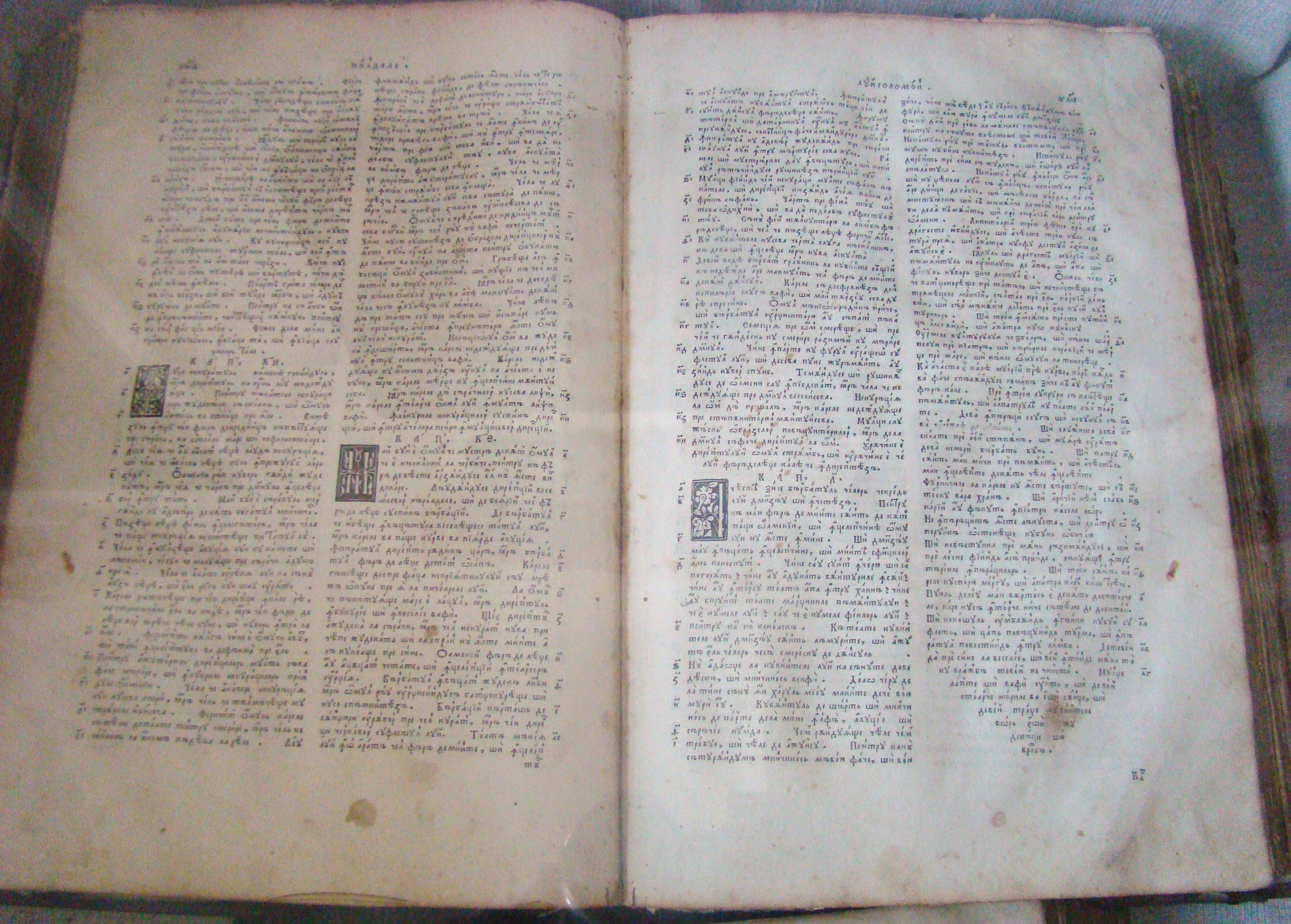
Șerban Cantacuzino Bible (1688)

The first complete Bible translation to Romanian was made in 1688, and called Biblia de la București (The Bible from Bucharest). The Old Testament was translated by Moldavian-born Nicolae Milescu in Constantinople. The translator used as his source a Septuagint published in Frankfurt in 1597. The manuscript was afterwards revised in Moldavia and later brought to Bucharest, where it was again subject to revision by a team of Wallachian scholars (among whom were Radu Greceanu and his brother Șerban Greceanu) with the help of Șerban Cantacuzino and Constantin Brâncoveanu.

== Background ==
Before the publication of the Biblia de la București, other partial translations were published, such as the Slavic-Romanian Tetraevangelion (Gospel) (Sibiu, 1551), Coresi's Tetraevangelion (Brașov, 1561), The Book of Psalms from Brașov (1570), the Palia de la Orăștie (Saxopolitan Old Testament) from 1581/1582 (the translators were Calvinist pastors from Transylvania), The New Testament of Alba Iulia (1648).

They were later followed by the Bible of Petru Pavel Aron (1760-1761), the Samuil Micu's Bible from Blaj (1795), and others.

== 20th century to present ==
In September 1911, the British and Foreign Bible Society (BFBS) printed the Iași Old Testament (1874) with the Nitzulescu New Testament (1895), revised by Professor Garboviceanu and checked by Prof Alexics. This was the official BFBS text before Cornilescu was adopted in 1924, but was more literal. This text was revised by Cornilescu from 1928 and printed by the Bible Society in 1931 but has not been issued since.

Two main translations are currently used in Romanian. The Orthodox Church uses the Synodal Version, the standard Romanian Orthodox Bible translation, published in 1988 with the blessings of Patriarch Teoctist Arăpașu. Most Protestant denominations use the Bible Society translation made by Dumitru Cornilescu. The New Testament was first published in 1921, and the whole Bible with references in 1924, produced by the British and Foreign Bible Society. In 1989 appeared an unofficial revision by German publishing house Gute Botschaft Verlag (GBV); it tried to get the existing translation closer to the original manuscripts, in a form grammatically corrected and adapted according to the evolution of the modern Romanian language.

The British and Foreign Bible Society, operating in Romania through the Interconfessional Bible Society of Romania (SBIR), brought out a special 90th anniversary definitive edition of the Cornilescu Bible in 2014, with many errors corrected.

== List of Bible translators ==
Some notable translators are:

- Petru Pavel Aron
- Constantin Brâncoveanu – into Romanian
- Dumitru Cornilescu – Protestant, translated into Romanian
- Gala Galaction – Romanian Orthodox, translated into Romanian
- Radu and Șerban Greceanu – translated into Romanian
- Eduard Patrașcu and Alois Bulai – Hebrew Masoretic (for OT) and Greek Septuagint (for deuterocaonicals/apocypha) and the Critical Greek text for the New Testament.

== Comparison ==
| Translation | John (Ioan) 3:16 |
|---|---|
| Cornilescu (1924) | Fiindcă atît de mult a iubit Dumnezeu lumea, că a dat pe singurul Lui Fiu, pentruca oricine crede în El, să nu piară, ci să aibă viaţă vecinică. |
| Cornilescu (2014) | Fiindcă atât de mult a iubit Dumnezeu lumea, că a dat pe singurul Lui Fiu, pentru ca oricine crede în El să nu piară, ci să aibă viaţa veşnică. |
| Biblia Catolică (Patrașcu, Bulai) (2020) | Într-adevăr, [atât de mult] a iubit Dumnezeu lumea, încât l-a dat pe Fiul său, unul născut, ca oricine crede în el să nu piară, ci să aibă viața veșnică. |
| New Translation into Romanian Language (NTLR, 2006) | Fiindcă atât de mult a iubit Dumnezeu lumea, încât L-a dat pe singurul Lui Fiu, pentru ca oricine crede în El să nu piară, ci să aibă viaţă veşnică. |
| Biblia GBV (1989) | Fiindcă atît de mult a iubit Dumnezeu lumea, că a dat pe singurul Său Fiu, pentru ca oricine crede în El să nu piară, ci să aibă viaţă veşnică. |
| Biblia Sinodală | Căci Dumnezeu aşa a iubit lumea, încât pe Fiul Său Cel Unul-Născut L-a dat ca oricine crede în El să nu piară, ci să aibă viaţă veşnică. |
| Traducerea lumii noi (2020) | Fiindcă atât de mult a iubit Dumnezeu lumea, încât l-a dat pe Fiul său unic-născut, pentru ca oricine manifestă credință în el să nu fie distrus, ci să aibă viață veșnică. |

== False friends ==
The Orthodox Bibles in the Romanian language, including the Cornilescu translation, which was initially intended to be an Orthodox translation, use the term "Malachians" or "Malacians" (i.e. "those who masturbate") for those who will not inherit the kingdom of heaven (1 Cor. 6: 9). According to Emanuel Conțac and Chrys C. Caragounis this translation is anachronistic (wrong), the word malakia changing its meaning in "masturbation" from the work of John Chrysostom (late 4th century AD).

The New Translation into Romanian Language (NTLR, Baptist, 2006, copyright by Biblica) does not have this false friend.
