= Pentecostalism in Ethiopia =

Pentecostalism in Ethiopia is the practice of various Pentecostal forms of Christianity—often included within the evangelical category of P'ent'ay—in Ethiopia, with a constituency of above 33 million members. Despite persecution by the government and the dominant Ethiopian Orthodox Church, Pentecostalism relied on youth and technology to spread its practices throughout the country. It has been found to contribute to the prosperity of people in Ethiopia. The message of Pentecostalism includes prosperity and beliefs around expectations for a better life. After gaining religious freedom in 1991, churches began preaching prosperity and growth outside the government and to discuss fighting corruption. Some Pentecostal worshipers state that the style of worship offers them tangible help for worldy problems. Worship services include the practices speaking in tongues, divine healing, exorcism, prophecy, and powerful prayer.

== History ==
=== Initial spread ===
In 1951, Anna-Liisa and Sanfrid Mattson traveled from Finland to Ethiopia and established a Pentecostal mission in Addis Ababa, the country's capital. In 1960, a mission was created in Awasa by the Swedish Philadelphia Church Mission. Pentecostalism, during the 1960s, attracted many students, and the movement grew enough that the Full Gospel Believers Church (FGBC) was created in 1967. Pentecostal practices eventually affected other Protestant denominations in Ethiopia, particularly the Lutheran church. Finnish and Swedish missionaries began the first Pentecostal initiatives in Ethiopia, largely independent of influenced by American practices. In 1967, the Ethiopian Full Gospel Believers Church (Mulu Wengel) was founded. This church was the first independent Pentecostal church of Ethiopia and is still the largest Pentecostal group in Ethiopia. As churches were established, they relied on university students from Ethiopian Orthodox backgrounds to assume leadership roles within the Pentecostal churches. The Pentecostal movement has mostly affected urban settings where young, educated, and middle-class people have been its main converts. The mobility of the youth and the similarities between their modernity and traveling allowed Pentecostalism to fit their lifestyles more than other Ethiopian religions. The lifestyle outlined by Pentecostalism fit the lifestyle of urban college students more than the Orthodox Christianity exposed to them throughout their childhood. These students were in their teens and twenties.

=== Persecution ===
The appeal for an officially recognized Pentecostal organization was rejected by the royal government. This was only the beginning of political repression, which accelerated in the 1970s. On one 1972 Sunday alone, 250 worshipers were arrested. In 1979, the Derg government shut down the Addis Ababa FBGC church. During the Derg period, Pentecostalism was targeted with the goal of stopping its practice by closing churches and beating and imprisoning practitioners. This was done to produce fear in believers and scare them from practicing Pentecostalism. Converted believers decided to return to their traditional culture. In a survey of non-orthodox Christians, 16 percent classified as Pentecostals during the Derg reign. All Protestant, Evangelical, Pentecostal, and born-again Christians were labeled as "Pente". This term was first used in a derogatory and mocking tone during the Derg regime. The term was first associated with the group after an attack on hundreds of Pentecostal youth in Debre Zeit in 1976. During the time when Pentecostals had to practice in closed areas, radio was one of the few methods they could rely on to spread their messages. In 1967 despite previous legislation, the registration of the Mulu Wengel Church was denied. People from outside the Pentecostal movement were alarmed by the "emotional stirring" brought about by the Gifts of the Holy Spirit. In 1979 Gudina Tumsa, Secretary General of the Mekane Yesus Church was executed, further forcing Pente groups to move their activities underground. Despite the desire for unity among Pentecostal leaders, many churches were small in numbers and divided from other Pentecostal churches.

== Pentecostalism and the Orthodox Church ==
Because the Ethiopian Orthodox Church has evolved throughout Ethiopian History, it has received certain privileges from the government. During the 1960s, the Ethiopian Orthodox Church was the only Christian denomination accepted by the government. This caused the emergence of Open and Closed areas where Orthodox Churches could practice freely, while Pentecostal churches and other denominations were forced to practice in private and keep a low profile. This governmental support of the Orthodox Church has led Pentecostals to structure their movement around national unity and to use to slogan "the Gospel for Ethiopia by Ethiopians". To further demonstrate national unity, Pentecostal churches rely on languages to reach more people. This is a practice taken from the Orthodox church, which uses Ge’ez. In Wolaita, people did not want to take on the Orthodox Christianity that was imposed by their conquerors, and many converted to Protestant Christianity. Physical attacks on Pentecostals were a result of the Orthodox hierarchy within the government and the distrust of Pentecostals by Orthodox believers.

== Pentecostalism and Ethiopian Youth ==
Much of the Pentecostal movement is targeted at youth. A group of Swedish Pentecostals relied on summer Bible schools to help spread the practices of Pentecostalism. Other youth were brought to Pentecostalism through friends and literature explaining the practices. In the 1960s youth groups were created in urban towns to promote exposure of Pentecostalism to youth. These youth groups have re-emerged through the Ethiopian Evangelical Student Association, which operates on all university campuses.

== Practices ==
Pentecostalism has paid attention to local spirits, while other Protestant churches have dismissed such spirits or denied belief in them. The use of exorcism reinforces the belief that Pentecostals and their God hold a special power over these spirits, a conviction that has led people to convert to Pentecostalism and abandon denominations that do not address the concerns of local people with such spirits. The practice of spiritual transformation brought in more people as it emphasized the transformation of the self and individuals. Not only do people accept Jesus as their savior, but they see themselves in a different perspective. People that joined the church are expected to cease non-Christian rituals, such as animal sacrifice. There are also expectations of behavior changes like abstaining from the consumption of alcohol. Pentecostalism is believed to offer tangible help and holistic salvation that incorporates the self, spirit, and behaviors. Gospel music, choirs, and a non-traditional music draw people to Pentecostal churches, as well. This along with preaching was seen by some as a more dynamic and emotional than other forms of Christianity.

== Oneness Pentecostalism ==
In the 1969, an Ethiopian minister named Teklemariam Gezahagne converted to Oneness Pentecostalism. In 1972, the government forced Oneness United Pentecostal Church missionaries, along with those from other denominations, out of Ethiopia. The established Oneness churches organized as the Apostolic Church of Ethiopia (ACE), and Teklemariam assumed leadership. Later, Teklemariam espoused a Christological doctrine which led to an official split with the UPC in 2001. Oneness Pentecostalism differs from traditional forms of Pentecostals because it rejects the Trinity and water baptism is in the name of Jesus Christ for the remission of sins rather than a church ritual.

== Current statistics ==
As of 2011, the three largest explicitly Pentecostal Ethiopian churches are the FGBC, the Hiwot Berhan Church (HBC), and the ACE. Each maintain constituencies of approximately 500,000 members. In 2007, 628 different Pente groups were registered with Ethiopia's Ministry of Justice. As of 2016 it is believed there are several million practitioners of Pentecostalism in Ethiopia.
