= Evangelical Church of Romania =

Protestant denomination in Romania

- Biserica Evanghelică Română
- Abbreviation: BER
- Type: Eastern Christianity
- Classification: Eastern Protestant
- Orientation: Plymouth Brethren (with Orthodox influences)
- Scripture: Bible
- Theology: Sola scriptura
- Polity: Congregationalist
- Region: Romania
- Language: Romanian
- Headquarters: Str. Carol Davila nr. 48, Sector 5, Bucharest
- Founder: Teodor Popescu & Dumitru Cornilescu
- Origin: 1923
- Separated from: Romanian Orthodox Church (1924); Christian Evangelical Church of Romania (1989)
- Merged into: Christian Evangelical Church of Romania (1939)
- Congregations: ca. 220
- Members: 15,514 (in 2011)
- Other names: Christians of the Scriptures, Tudorists
- Publications: Adevărul Creștin
- Official website: ber.ro

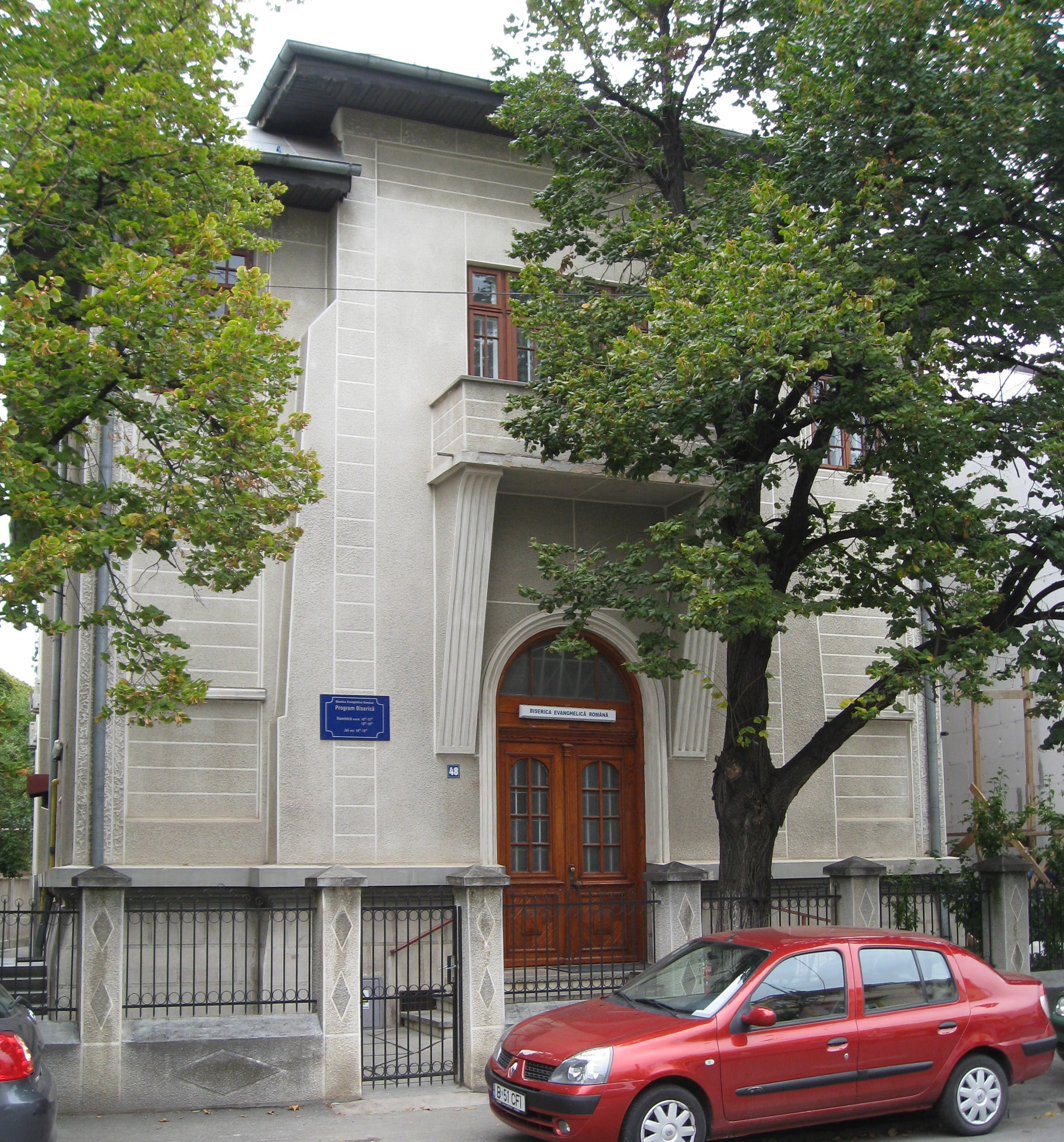
Church headquarters (1926), in Bucharest's Cotroceni quarter, near the Carol Davila University of Medicine and Pharmacy.

The Evangelical Church of Romania (Romanian: Biserica Evanghelică Română, BER) is a Protestant denomination that emerged out of the Romanian Orthodox Church. It is one of Romania's nineteen officially recognised religious denominations.

== History ==
The church originated between 1920 and 1924, the work of the young Romanian Orthodox theologians Dumitru Cornilescu (whose Bible translation is used by most Protestant churches in Romania) and Tudor Popescu (a former priest at the Cuibul cu barză Church). Also known as Tudorites, the deeply pietistic movement, regarded as the only Protestant church with Romanian origins, originated in a profound religious experience of Popescu's. Following this, he began to preach repentance and faith, questioning the significance attached by Orthodoxy to the saints, icons and the sacraments, and emphasising the centrality of the Bible instead of the liturgy. Eventually excommunicated and barred from addressing Orthodox congregations, he was lent an auditorium by an affiliate of the Anglican Mission to the Jews in Bucharest. Much to the consternation of his former church, he was able to firmly establish his work, drawing large crowds with his very popular preaching.

Under the leadership of Popescu and Cornilescu, several hundred followers built a 1000-seat mother church in 1926, which still drew close to eight hundred worshipers on an average Sunday morning in the early 1990s. At the request of government authorities, some of whom Popescu deeply impressed, the new movement registered as an association in 1927 and, in order to be distinguished from other groups, took the name Christians of the Scriptures. Shortly thereafter, churches opened in Ploiești, Câmpulung, Târgoviște, Rucăr, Buzău, Pitești, Bârlad, Brașov and other places.

In 1939, despite differences in dogma and worship, the National Renaissance Front regime compelled the Christians of the Scriptures to merge with the Christian Evangelicals, resulting in the Christian Evangelical Church. The resultant church had two branches: branch I, which practised believer's baptism, and the Tudorite branch II, which employed infant baptism. (The difference stemmed from the tradition whence each emerged: Plymouth Brethren and Romanian Orthodox, respectively.) Outlawed under the World War II-era regime of Ion Antonescu, in 1946, the Evangelical Christians were recognised as a religious body by the Romanian state, with the Tudorites once again merged into the Plymouth Brethren church, and also including a splinter group called "Christians" centred at Ploieşti. (For an overview of the church's development under the Communist regime, see Christian Evangelical Church of Romania.) Following the 1989 Revolution and the fall of the regime, the two branches split at a general conference held in Bucharest a month later. They separated ostensibly over the issue of baptism, with the second emerging as the Evangelical Church of Romania.

== Organisation ==
According to the 2011 census, the church had 15,514 members, making up 0.08% of the population; it was the country's 15th largest recognised religious body. As of 2008, there were some 220 churches, mainly in Bucharest and in the counties of Ilfov, Argeș, Brașov, Constanța, Dâmbovița, Ialomița, Prahova and Vaslui. The church considers all members to be brothers, has no clergy or hierarchy, is completely reliant on a lay ministry, and considers Christ as its head. At the national level, there is a brethren assembly of elected representatives, which supervises and coordinates church life, as well as a leadership committee that represents the church in its dealings with the state. Members are not required to make contributions for the upkeep of the church. The church's justification for baptism by immersion is that the early Christians had this practice, but it stresses the importance of personal belief in Christ and not just baptism. During services, members sing together fervently without benefit of a choir or instruments. Bible readings and expositions, as well as prayers, are also featured, and services' spontaneity leads to considerable member participation, with individual churches enjoying strong autonomy.

The church published a semimonthly newsletter, Adevărul Creștin ("The Christian Truth"), as well as other theological works. It has relations with the Union of Evangelical Free Church Congregations in Germany as well as with evangelical churches in the Netherlands and the United States, but has no direct outside equivalent.
