= Dumitru Cornilescu =

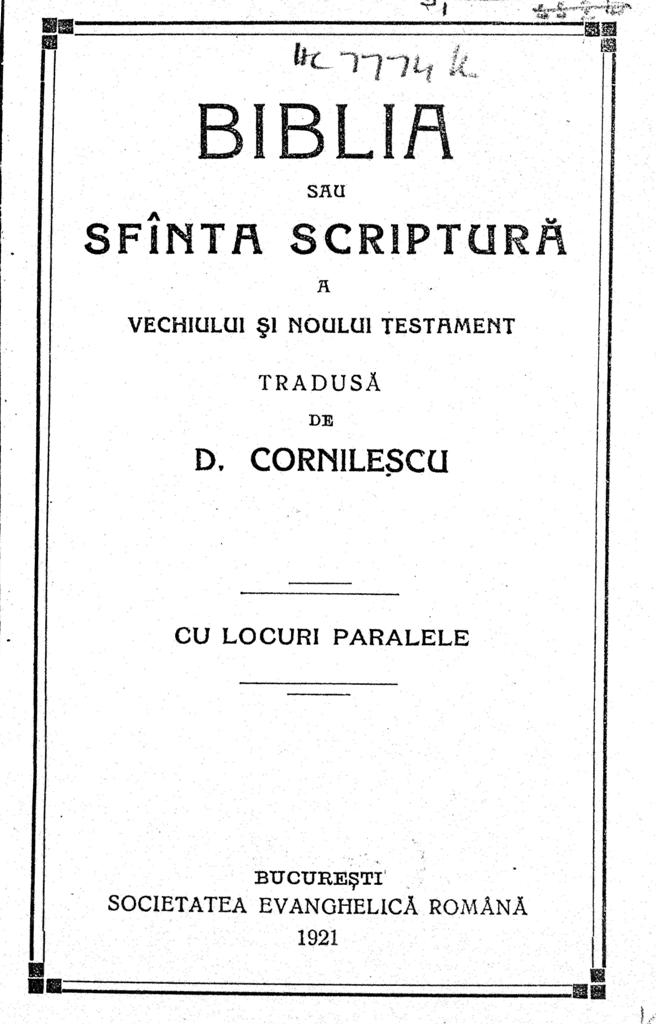
Title page of Cornilescu's 1921 Bible

Dumitru Cornilescu (4 April 1891 – 1975) was a Romanian archdeacon who produced a popular translation of the Bible into Romanian, published in 1921. Although referred to as "Father Cornilescu", he was never ordained as a Romanian Orthodox priest. After his conversion, he served as a Protestant minister. Cornilescu's translation is the most popular version of the Bible among Romanian Protestants.

== Early life ==
Cornilescu was born in Slașoma, Mehedinți County, the son of a teacher. Both his grandfathers were Orthodox priests. He studied at the Central Seminary from 1904, quickly becoming noted for his scholarly diligence. He felt that existing Romanian versions of the Bible, notably the Bucharest Bible of 1688, were written in an archaic form of the language and that a modern version was badly needed. In 1913 he became a Romanian language tutor to Rev. John Howard Adeney who was the Anglican priest in Bucharest, and also agent for the British and Foreign Bible Society (BFBS), and in this way Cornilescu started a relationship with the Bible Society. In 1914 Cornilescu became a monk so that he could concentrate on translating. His work was supported financially by the Princess Ralu Callimachi, a Moldavian noblewoman, who was also a supporter of the Bible Society. His version of the Psalms appeared in 1920, followed by the New Testament in 1921, and, later in the same year, the full Bible. The printing was paid for through Bible Society friends in Switzerland and England.

== Bibles ==
=== 1924 Cornilescu Bible ===
From 1923 to 1924 Cornilescu lived in London, where he worked on the revision of the Bible with the Bible Society. The revised edition was published in 1924. Cornilescu gave his text to the Bible Society, and the text was adopted as the official BFBS Bible text for Romania, and this is basically the main Cornilescu Bible which is used in Romania today.

=== Controversies ===
Initially the Bible was widely circulated, but by 1924 a number of objections had been raised by Orthodox priests and theologians. For example, the Greek word presbyteroi was translated literally as prezbiteri (elders) and not preoți (priests), a decision that was seen as a threat to the Orthodox belief in apostolic succession. Cornilescu's translation was not approved by the Holy Synod of the Romanian Orthodox Church. By the early 1930s, its huge success led the Orthodox religious authorities to try to stop its dissemination in rural areas. To this end, they appealed to Gheorghe Mironescu, the Minister of the Interior, who in 1933 prohibited the Bible's distribution in Romanian villages. However the translation had the support of many people, including King Carol II.

The controversy prompted the creation of an approved Orthodox version, translated by Vasile Radu and Grigorie Pișculescu, published in 1938 (revised 1968 and 1975).

In 1924 another controversy occurred when Scripture Gift Mission (SGM) reproduced the text without permission of Cornilescu nor the Bible Society, and Cornilescu made it clear that he wanted his text to be published only by the Bible Society.

Because of the opposition, Cornilescu left the Orthodox Church. Along with Tudor Popescu (a former priest at the Cuibul cu barză Church in Bucharest), he founded the Evangelical Church of Romania, which initially met in the hall of the Anglican Church. His translation became the standard Protestant version in Romania and had numerous reprints and editions.

=== 1931 Cornilescu Bible ===
From 1927 Cornilescu worked on revising the old BFBS Romanian translation from 1911, to update the existing more literal translation. In September 1927, with his Swiss wife and their son, he returned to England, where he lived in Brighton and worked with the Bible Society on a Bible revision. In August 1929 the family returned to Switzerland. This bible was printed in 1931 as a Family Bible and is sometimes known as the Traducere Literală Cornilescu (Cornilescu literal translation).

== Later life ==
Following the strong doctrinal differences between Cornilescu and other theologians of the time, and the emergence of the ultra-orthodox and fascist Iron Guard, Cornilescu was advised by Patriarch Miron Cristea to leave Romania for a period, which he did in 1923. He moved to Switzerland, settling briefly in Montreux before moving to England for two years. Afterwards, he returned to Switzerland, where he married and had a son. Then the war and the post-war Communist take over of Romania gave him no incentive to return. He lost his Romanian citizenship and became a Swiss national. From 1947 to 1953 his brother Prof. George Cornilescu ran the Bible Society offices in Bucharest. On 8 February 1971, Dumitru Cornilescu was made an Honorary Life Governor of the British and Foreign Bible Society, in recognition of the translation which he had done for the Bible Society. He died in Switzerland in 1975, survived by his wife Anne and son, and was buried in Clarens-Montreux Cemetery, where his wife Anne was also buried in 2007.

=== Legacy ===
All Cornilescu's letters and correspondence about his translation work for the Bible Society are preserved in the BFBS archives at Cambridge University. Today his Bibles are copyright the British and Foreign Bible Society, operating in Romania through the Interconfessional Bible Society of Romania. The Cornilescu Bible has been digitised and corrected by the Bible Society, and they brought out a special 90th anniversary definitive edition of the Cornilescu Bible in 2014. The story of Cornilescu, the Bible Society and his translation was published as book by Emanuel Conțac in November 2014. A modern revision of the Cornilescu Bible is now underway by the Bible Society. The pilot edition of the revision project, containing Genesis, Mark, John and Romans, was published in November 2016. The introduction of the edition offers a comprehensive explanation of the methods and criteria used by the translators.

== See also ==
- Bible translations into Romanian
