= Ethiopian Evangelical Church Mekane Yesus =

Lutheran denomination in Ethiopia

- Logo of the EECMY
- Classification: Protestant
- Orientation: Lutheran (with some Pentecostal influence and one Presbyterian-leaning synod); Evangelical
- Theology: Pietistic Lutheran
- Leader: Yonas Yigezu
- Associations: Lutheran World Federation; World Communion of Reformed Churches; World Council of Churches; All Africa Conference of Churches; Fellowship of Christian Councils and Churches in the Great Lakes and Horn of Africa; Evangelical Church Fellowship of Ethiopia
- Region: Ethiopia
- Origin: 1959; Addis Ababa
- Congregations: 8,500 + 4000 preaching stations
- Members: 15,000,000 (2025)
- Ministers: 3,000
- Missionaries: Mekane Yesus International Missionary Society
- Official website: www.eecmy.org

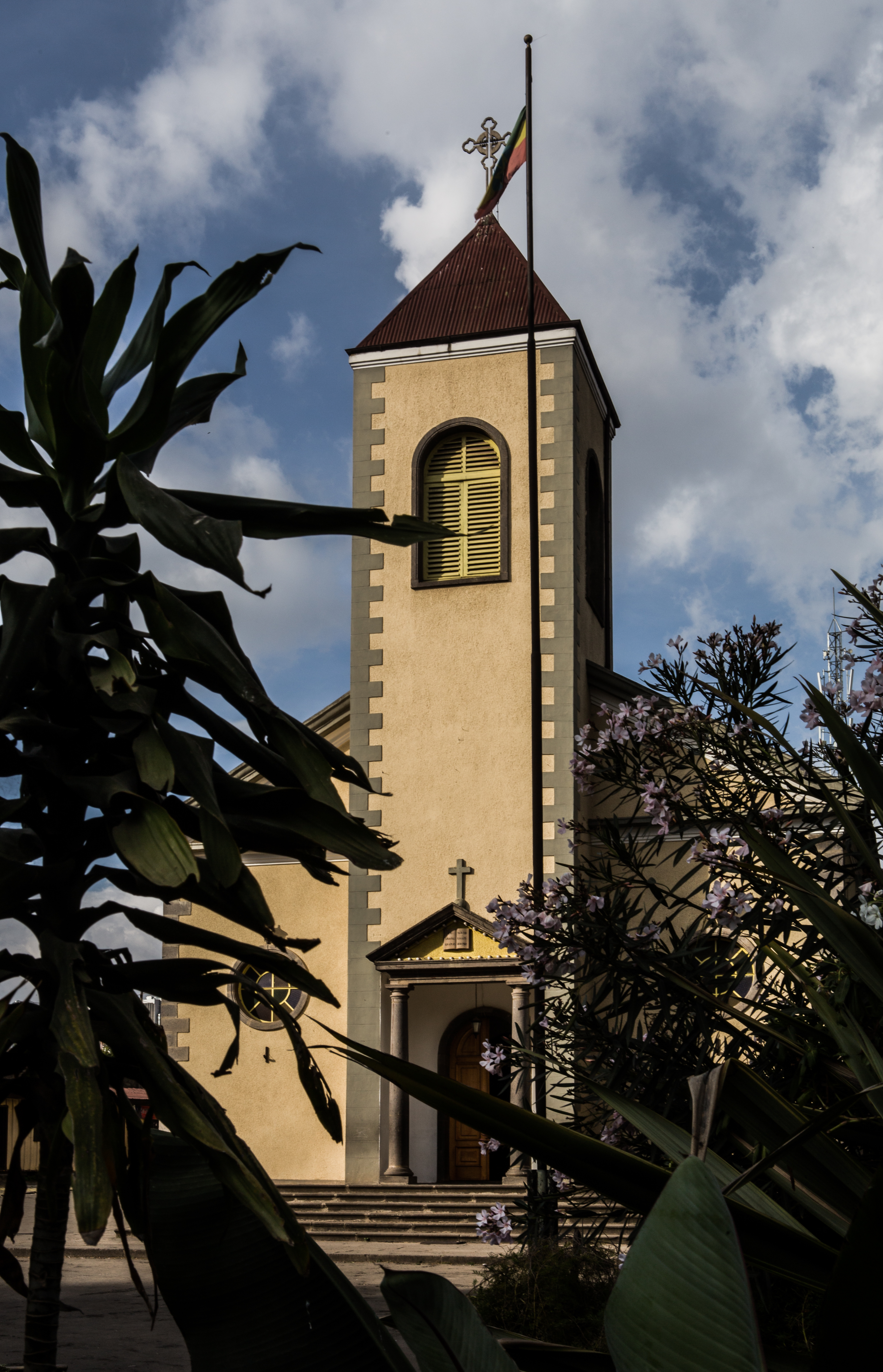
Amist Kilo church, the original EECMY church in Addis Ababa

The Ethiopian Evangelical Church Mekane Yesus (EECMY; also called Mekane Yesus Church) is a Lutheran denomination in Ethiopia. It is the largest member church of the Lutheran World Federation and of World Communion of Reformed Churches. It is a Lutheran denomination with some Pentecostal influence and one Presbyterian-leaning synod, with a large Pietistic following.

With the encouragement of the Lutheran and Presbyterian missionary societies in Ethiopia and the Lutheran World Federation, the Evangelical congregations in several parts of the country met on April 23 and 25, 1958 to deliberate on the draft constitution and establish the EECMY. From these joint efforts the church was instituted as a national church on January 21, 1959, taking its name from the first congregation in Addis Ababa, Mekane Yesus ("Place of Jesus"). EECMY has a motto of "Serving the Whole Person" that was developed in the 1970s. This "holistic ministry" theme has helped it to carry out its ministry in evangelism and development work. One of the leading theologians of the EECMY was Gudina Tumsa (1929–1979), who was general secretary for several years up until his arrest and murder at the hands of the communist government of Ethiopia in 1979.

The church, which was born out of Swedish missionary work amongst others, today through Mekane Yesus International Missionary Society itself has many missionaries in countries all around the world: South Asia, several African countries, the Middle East, and Guyana.

== History ==
The EECMY was founded on work begun by Northern European missionaries in the late 19th and early 20th centuries. These missionaries concentrated their work in southern Ethiopia, where the Orthodox Christian influence was less profound.

The Reformed section of the denomination was founded by the United Presbyterian Church in 1869. Dr. Thomas Lambie, a missionary of the United Presbyterian Church, begun work in the western part of the country. During the Italian occupation, missionaries were forced to leave, but the Bethel Evangelical Church was founded with native believers. It became an independent church in 1947. After World War II, BEC experienced rapid growth. In 1974 it became part of the EECMY, and now it has more than 1,000 000 members. Former BEC presbyteries and synods retain their names. In the western Synod of Gambela, more than 60% of the population are members of the Bethel Evangelical Church.

In 2000, the EECMY ordained the first women as pastors.

== Beliefs and theology ==
The EECMY adheres to evangelical Lutheran theology, emphasizing salvation by grace through faith, the authority of Scripture, and the sacraments of Baptism and Holy Communion. The church also reflects Pentecostal influence in its emphasis on spiritual renewal and charismatic worship, and includes one Presbyterian-leaning synod. As part of the P'ent'ay movement, EECMY shares theological and missional values with other Ethiopian evangelical churches, while maintaining its Lutheran confessional identity.

== Liturgical practices ==
Although the EECMY is doctrinally aligned with Lutheranism, its worship reflects the Eastern Christian heritage of Ethiopia. The church incorporates elements of the Alexandrian Rite, including adaptations of the Liturgy of St. Dioscurus, which is historically associated with the Coptic Orthodox Church and the Ethiopian Orthodox Tewahedo Church. Services often include chant, incense, vestments, and observance of the liturgical calendar, creating a worship experience that blends evangelical theology with Eastern ceremonial tradition. This liturgical expression aligns with the church’s identity as an Eastern Protestant denomination within the P'ent'ay movement.

== Governance and structure ==
The EECMY is governed through a synodical structure, consisting of regional synods and a national General Assembly. Each synod is led by elected officials, including a president and secretary, and sends representatives to the General Assembly, which serves as the highest decision-making body. While the church does not follow a traditional episcopal model, it maintains hierarchical oversight through its synod system. The EECMY also operates various commissions and departments focused on theology, mission, education, and development, reflecting its commitment to holistic ministry and organizational accountability.

== Membership ==
| Year | Membership |
|---|---|
| 2009 | 5,279,822 |
| 2011 | 5,846,407 |
| 2013 | 6,355,838 |
| 2015 | 7,886,595 |
| 2019 | 10,404,128 |
| 2023 | 12,000,000 |
| 2025 | 15,000,000 |

In 2023, the EECMY reported having 12,000,000 members to the Lutheran World Federation, being the largest member denomination of the organization. It is also the largest full member denomination of the World Communion of Reformed Churches. In 2025, it reported having 15 million members.

Between 2009 and 2023, the denomination grew by 127.28%. During the same period, the Ethiopian population grew by 45.84%.

the EECMY operates a seminary in Addis Ababa with 150 students. The church also owns several bible colleges, schools, and health care and social facilities in various locations throughout the country. In Addis Ababa it also runs a language and cultural orientation school, called MY-LINC, for people who want to learn Ethiopian languages. Most congregations speak local languages, but the International Lutheran Church (Ethiopia) in Addis Ababa is English-speaking.

== Relations with other churches ==
The EECMY approved the establishment of a full communion relationship with the North American Lutheran Church at their convocation in August 2011. The EECMY decided to end its partnership with the Evangelical Lutheran Church in America and the Church of Sweden, because of their acceptance of same-sex unions and non-celibate homosexual clergy, after a resolution that was approved at the 19th General Assembly in Addis Ababa, on February 11, 2013. The EECMY has also established relationships with the Lutheran Church–Missouri Synod and the Reformed Church in America, both from the United States. As a member of the Evangelical Church Fellowship of Ethiopia, the EECMY is in communion or cooperation with the Ethiopian Kale Heywet Church (a Baptist denomination), the Ethiopian Full Gospel Believers' Church (a Pentecostal denomination), and the Meserete Kristos Church (a Mennonite-affiliated denomination).

The EECMY is a member of the Global Confessional and Missional Lutheran Forum, the Lutheran World Federation, the World Council of Churches, the All Africa Conference of Churches, the Lutheran Communion in Central and Eastern Africa, and the World Communion of Reformed Churches.

The EECMY, because of its development work, is a member of ACT Development, a global alliance of churches and related agencies committed to working together on development. EECMY is a participant in the Wycliffe Global Alliance and it is a member of the Fellowship of Christian Councils and Churches in the Great Lakes and Horn of Africa.

== See also ==
- List of the largest Protestant bodies
