= Washa Mikael Rock-Hewn Church =

- Location within Ethiopia
- 9°01′54″N 38°40′16″E
- Location: Addis Ababa
- Address: Yeka sub-city
- Country: Ethiopia
- Denomination: Ethiopian Orthodox Tewahedo Church

History
- Founder: Emperor Abreha

Architecture
- Architectural type: Ethiopian architecture
- Years built: 320 AD

The Washa Mikael Rock-Hewn Church (Amharic: ዋሻ ሚካኤል [wä schä mi kä el] literally "The Cave of Michael") is a rock-hewn semi-monolithic church located in the Yeka district of Addis Ababa, the capital city of Ethiopia.

== History ==
The cave of Washa Mika'el is cut into the interior of an ignimbrite massi located at an altitude of 3,118m on the highland plateau located six kilometers from Addis Ababa. The Washa Michael (cave of Michael) rock-hewn church is a historic church built in the late 3rd century AD in the reign of Emperor Abreha making it more than 1600 years old. The roof has caved in due to Italian bombardment in 1935 yet most of its walls and arches, including those of the holy of holies or Mekdes in Amharic still remain standing.

In the 19th century, Emperor Menelik II rediscovered the structure after it was initially abandoned during the Ethiopian–Adal war. He had the Tabot of St. Michael moved from inside the church to a church he had built lower down the mountain called Yeka Mikael. He subsequently made attempts at restoring and preserving the structures of the church.

The church suffered damage during the heavy bombing campaigns of the Italians during the Second Italo-Ethiopian War.

== Gallery ==
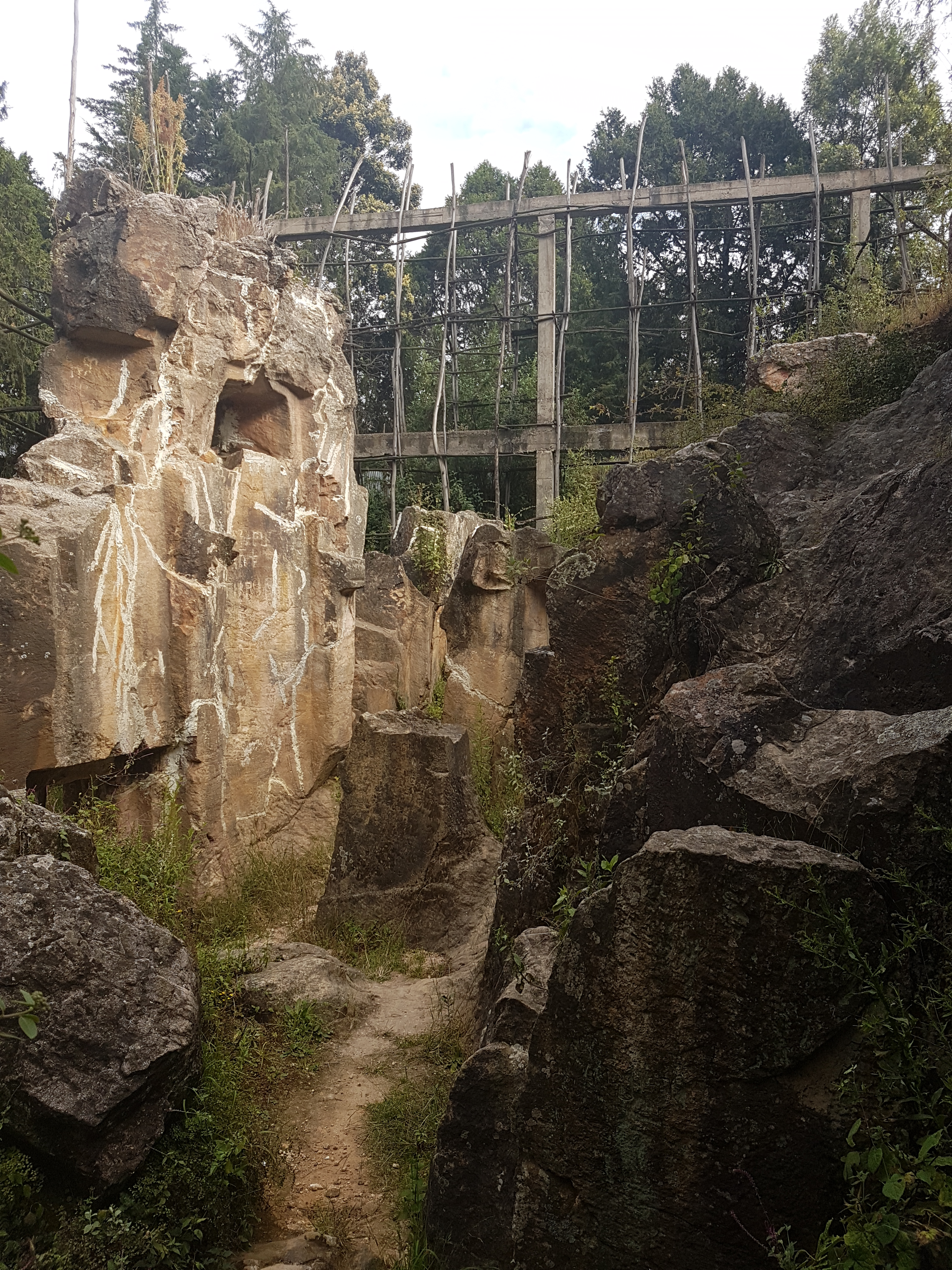
General view of the site including modern concrete pillars (restoration attempt)

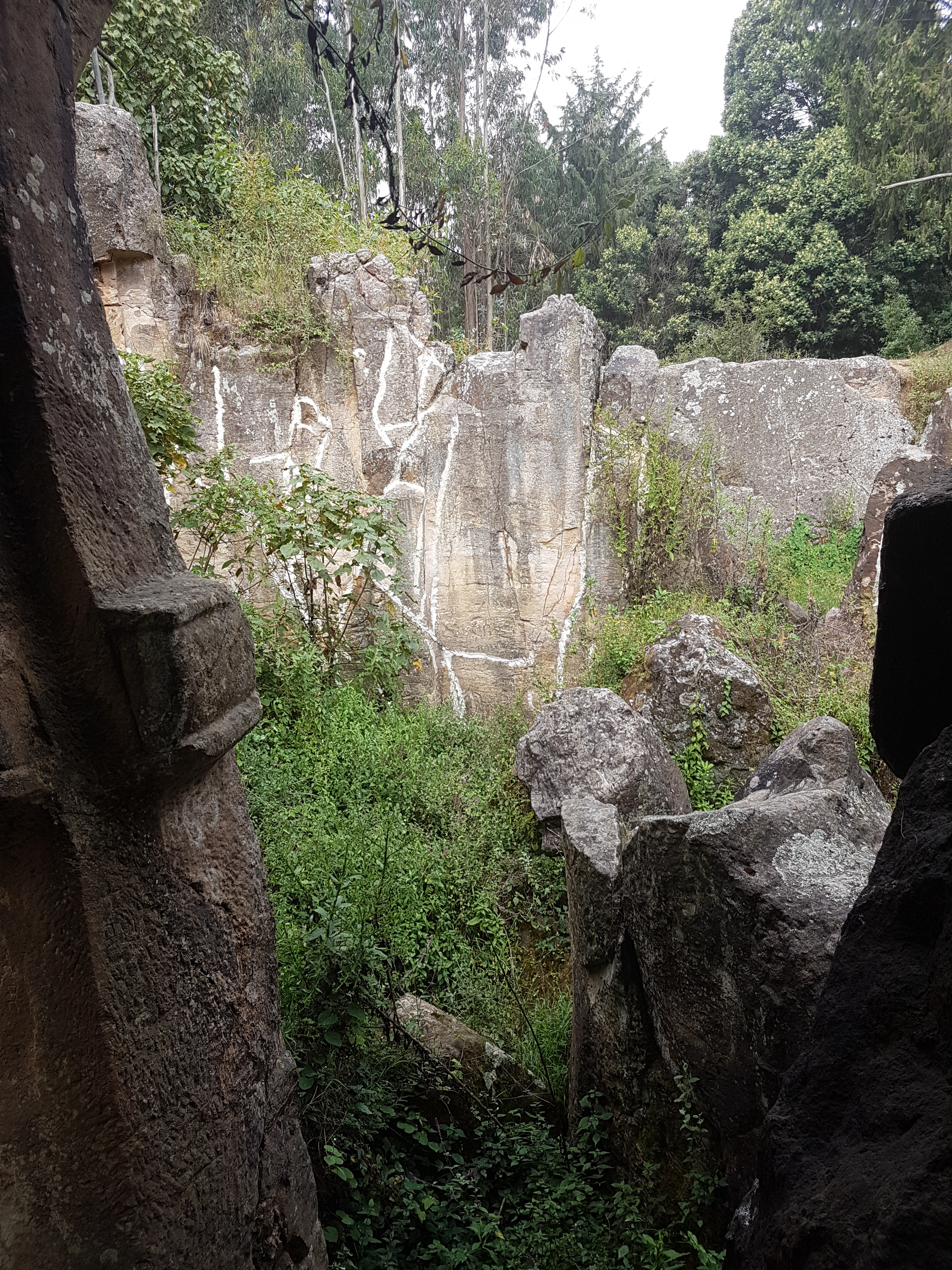
General view of the site; pillar

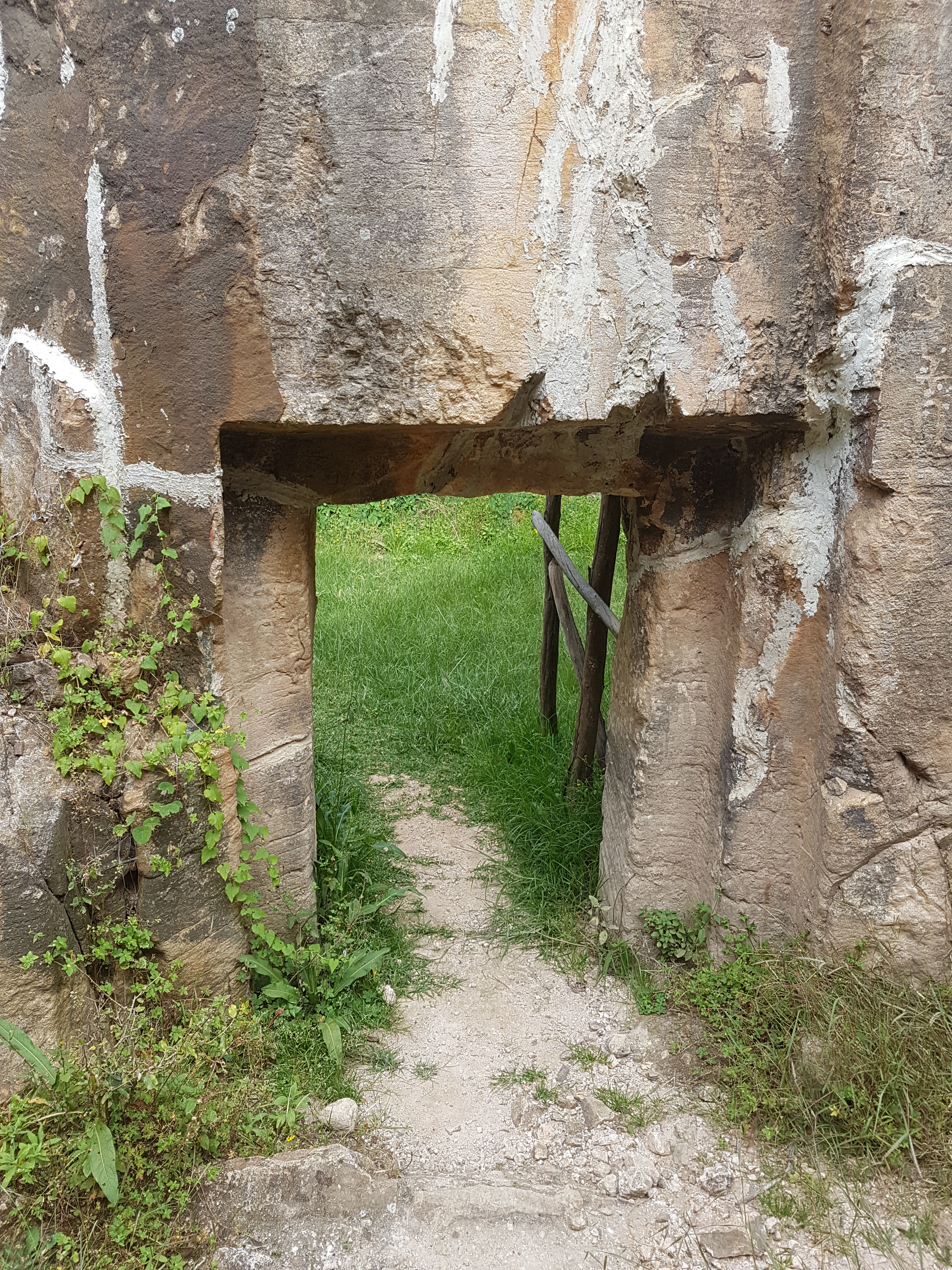
Gate leading to the church

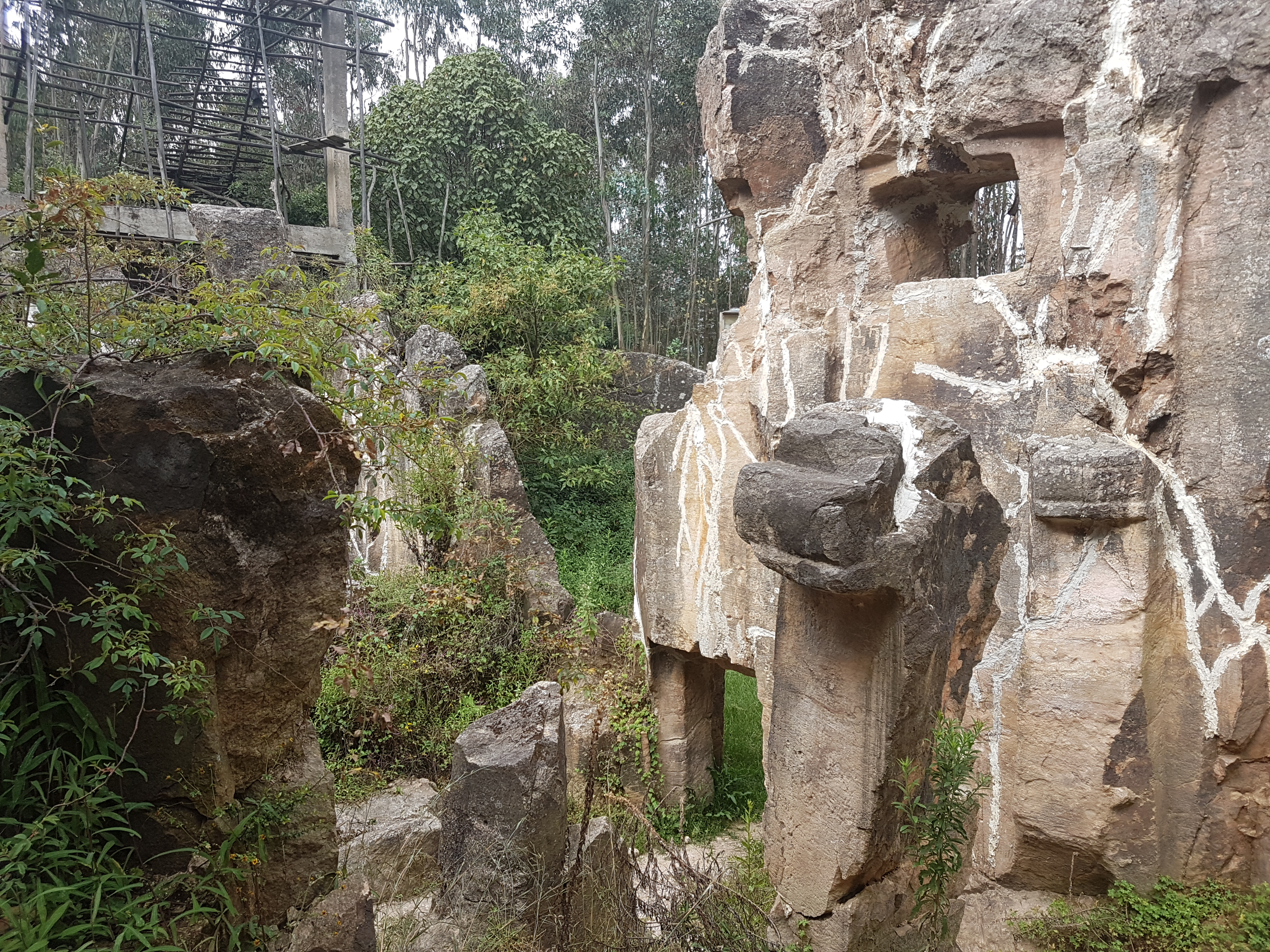
General view of the site with marks of restoration

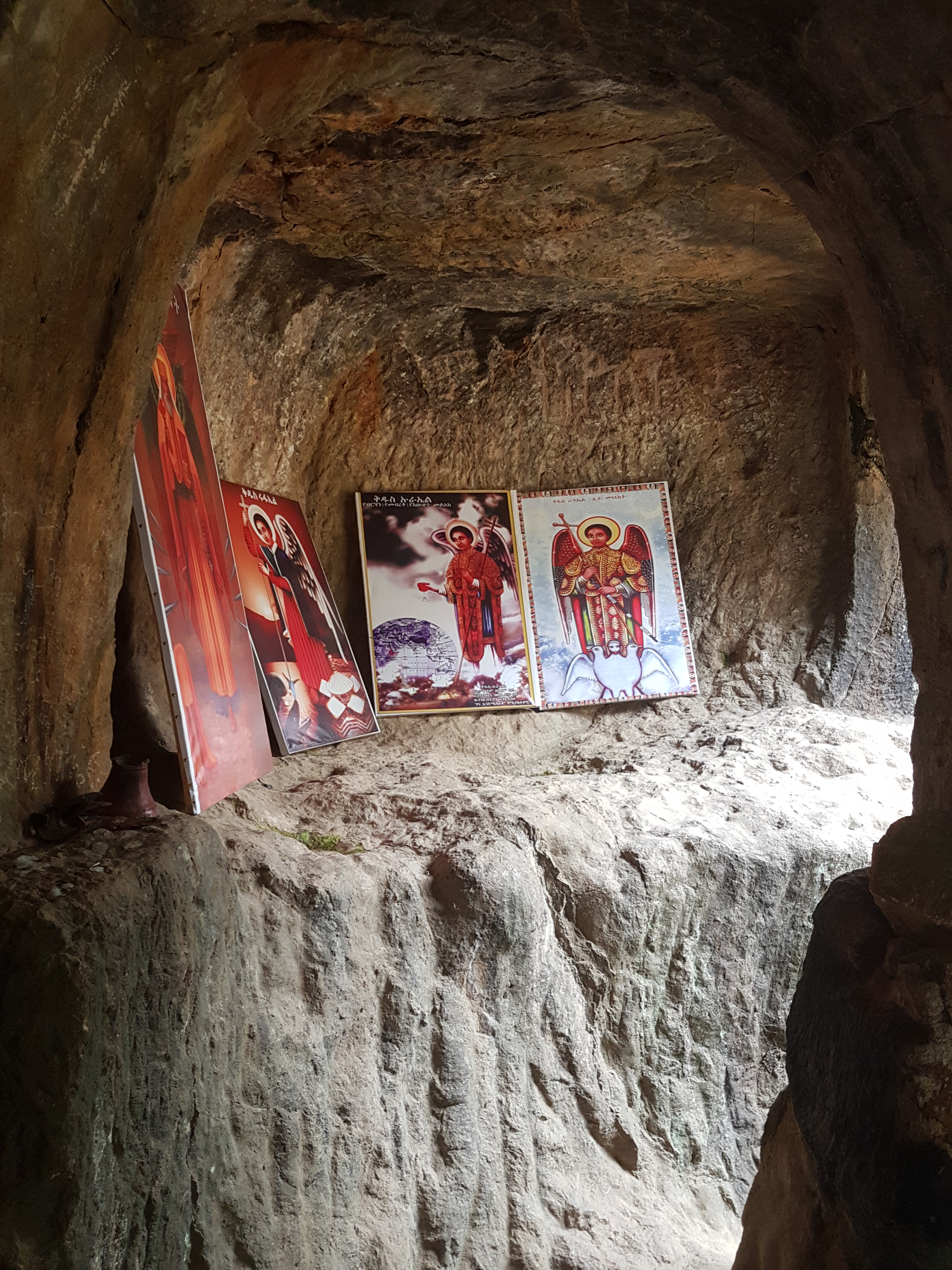
Icons inside the church

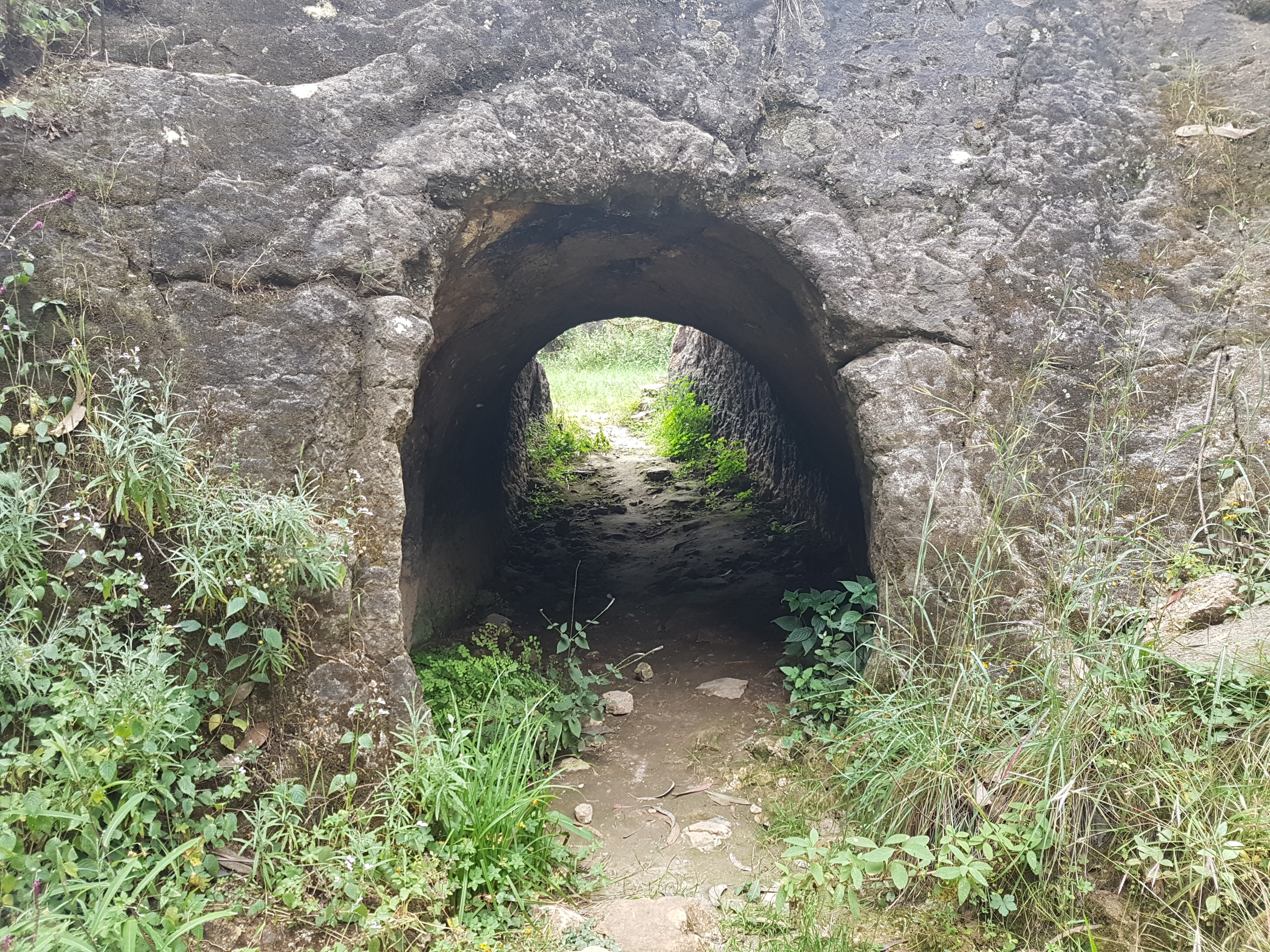
Access tunnel
