= International Lutheran Church (Ethiopia) =

Coordinates: 9°00′57.2″N 38°44′32.2″E

The International Lutheran Church (ILC), now called the Redeemer International Congregation of the EECMY, is the English-speaking congregation of the Ethiopian Evangelical Church Mekane Yesus (EECMY) which meets in the Lideta region of Addis Ababa, Ethiopia. Although it follows the Lutheran confession and worship, Redeemer welcomes any Christian worshippers.

== Services and programs ==
Until 2021, English-language services were held at 11 AM on Sunday morning, with the Amharic congregation meeting first at 8am. Since 2021 the Redeemer English service now begins at 8:45am with the Amharic service of the Lideta congregation beginning at 10:30 am. Following Sunday morning worship, the Redeemer congregation enjoys fellowship time together outside.

Redeemer offers a Sunday School program for younger children and a Bible Study class for older children. These classes depend on volunteers from within the congregation. Holy Communion is celebrated the first Sunday of each month during the regular service. Easter Special services are held at various times of the year, including at Easter (a 6am sunrise service), a candlelight service on Christmas Eve and a Maundy Thursday service. There are women and men's Bible study groups, a youth group and confirmation instruction as requested, though these programs vary from year to year based on the membership.

The programs and expenses of the congregation are met entirely by gifts from members and Sunday visitors. Besides support for the Addis Ababa Synod of EECMY, the budget of ILC/Redeemer has included over the years, support for many Christian organizations working in Ethiopia, such as Mekane Yesus Seminary scholarships, the Bible Society of Ethiopia, Win Souls for God, Mother Theresa Orphanage, AHOPE Orphanage, the EECMY School of Jazz, as well as benevolence requests.

== History ==
The first service for the International Lutheran Church was held on December 1, 1957 at the Amest Kilo Mekane Yesus church, the oldest Ethiopian congregation of the EECMY. This first service of ILC was organized by Dr. Herbert G. Schaefer, the director of the American Lutheran Mission and the ILC congregation was officially organized in May, 1958 with eleven adult members from the international community in Addis Ababa. Sunday School classes began in 1959. The use of the English language by ILC was an attraction for non-Amharic speakers from embassies, non-government organizations and business personnel. They made up a large percentage of the members throughout its history. Missionary pastors and families from various Lutheran and Presbyterian missions were also active. Although the confessional statement of the congregation is Lutheran, Christians were all welcomed. Ethiopians who preferred to worship in English were also included.

In 1960 ILC became a member of the Wollo-Tigre Synod of the Ethiopian Evangelical Church Mekane Yesus. When the Addis Ababa congregations formed their own synod, ILC transferred its membership to the Central Ethiopia Synod. When the congregations within Addis Ababa became part of the Addis Ababa Synod in the 1990s, ILC was instead transferred under the guidance of the EECMY Head Office.

In 1961 the present site was purchased. The new church building was dedicated on December 1, 1963, six years after the first service. Rev. Leonard Flachman of ALM chaired the building committee and designed the furniture. Later the pastors’ offices and Sunday School rooms were added. A Day Care Center was built in 1980. Later, the rear of the sanctuary was expanded and more offices were added.

When the church was dedicated in 1963, an Ethiopian evangelist was hired by ILC, and the Amharic speaking Lideta Mekane Yesus congregation was later organized. ILC pastors (specifically Rev. Bob Avers and Rev. Dr. Loren Bliese from ALM and Rev. Torgny Erling from the Swedish Evangelical Mission) worked closely with the evangelist and later the Ethiopian pastors to encourage this Amharic fellowship. A house for an Ethiopian pastor was built behind the church, and Kes Asfaw Kalbero was called and served for many years, followed by other Ethiopian pastors. During the Derg regime many new members joined the Amharic congregation from churches that were closed, so that the Lideta congregation outgrew ILC.

Sunday morning hours were divided between the two congregations. Initially ILC held services on Sunday afternoons so that the Amharic congregation could met in the church building in the mornings. A committee was formed by representative from ILC and Lideta that met regularly to deal with mutual concerns such as sharing upkeep and expenses for the church building and compound, and timing of services and other activities. During the Covid Pandemic in 2020, all church services were cancelled by the government for many months. When services were permitted to resume, ILC took the morning service time, starting at 8:45am, and the Amharic congregation switched to a 10:30am starting time.

In 2021, the ILC congregation approved the name change from International Lutheran Church to Redeemer International Congregation of the EECMY. At that time Redeemer also became a member of the Addis Ababa Synod of the EECMY.

EECMY includes Presbyterian Synods, and besides the Lutheran ministers, Reformed and Presbyterian missionaries have contributed to the ministry and fellowship of ILC. Much of the time, the worship services and work of the congregation have been carried out by volunteers from many denominations.

== Leadership ==
The first pastors of ILC were missionaries of the American Lutheran Mission and served part-time, including Dr. Schaefer, Lowel Hesterman, Richard Jensen, Dennis Everson, Robert Avers and Loren Bliese. In the 1960s and early 1970s two volunteer retired pastors, Rev. Fredericks and Rev. Reitz from the USA, served for two years each. Rev. Paul Voltz from Radio Voice of the Gospel also served part-time. In the 1970s and 1980s Rev. Torgny Erling from Sweden, and Rev. Pekka Harne from Finland served basically full-time, and Rev. Johnny Bakke from Norway served part-time in the 1990s. Dr. Philip and Rene Johnson from the Evangelical Lutheran Church in America served form 2000 until 2006 as the part-time pastoral team. Dr. Peter and Patty Ford from the Reformed Church in America served as part-time pastors from 2006 until 2009. Rev. Ann Staal was ordained at ILC in 2010 through the EECMY, and then served as pastor through June 2012. In August 2012, Pastor Doug Steinke arrived with his family, and took on his ministry until 2014. In 2016, Rev. Torbjörn Toll of the Swedish Evangelical Mission, served as part-time pastor for one year. Pastor Andreas Thornell from the Swedish Evangelical Mission was pastor from 2019 through 2021. In 2014 ILC put a Pastoral Team in place to support the spiritual life of the congregation, specifically during times without a pastor. The pastoral team consisting of several pastors from within the congregation membership, from various countries who share the pastoral duties of the congregation.

== Membership and governance ==
Membership is open to all Christian denominations, and associate membership is offered for those who want to retain their membership in their previous churches. The membership of ILC includes evangelical Christians from all over. The church welcomes visitors from all over the world every Sunday, including many from Scandinavia. The ILC is governed by an elected Church Council of five to eight members. Council members are elected for two-year terms and may serve unlimited terms. Council elections typically take place in February at the congregation's Annual General Meeting (AGM).

== See also ==
- P'ent'ay
- Ethiopian Evangelical Church Mekane Yesus
