= Paul Marty =

Paul Marty (1882-1938) was a French military officer, colonial administrator, interpreter and writer on Islam.

Marty was born in Boufarik, Algeria.

== Works ==
- Études sur l'Islam maure. Cheikh Sidïa. Les Fadelia. Les Ida ou Ali, 1916
- Études sur l'Islam au Sénégal, 1917
- L'Islam en Guinée : Fouta-Diallon, 1917
- Études sur l'Islam et les tribus du Soudan, 1918
- Études sur l'Islam et les tribus maures; les Brakna, 1920
- Études sur l'Islam en Côte d'Ivoire, 1922
- Études sur l'Islam au Dahomey : le bas Dahomey, le haut Dahomey, 1926
- L'islam et les tribus dans la colonie du Niger, 1930
