= Bucharest Bible =

Romanian language Bible

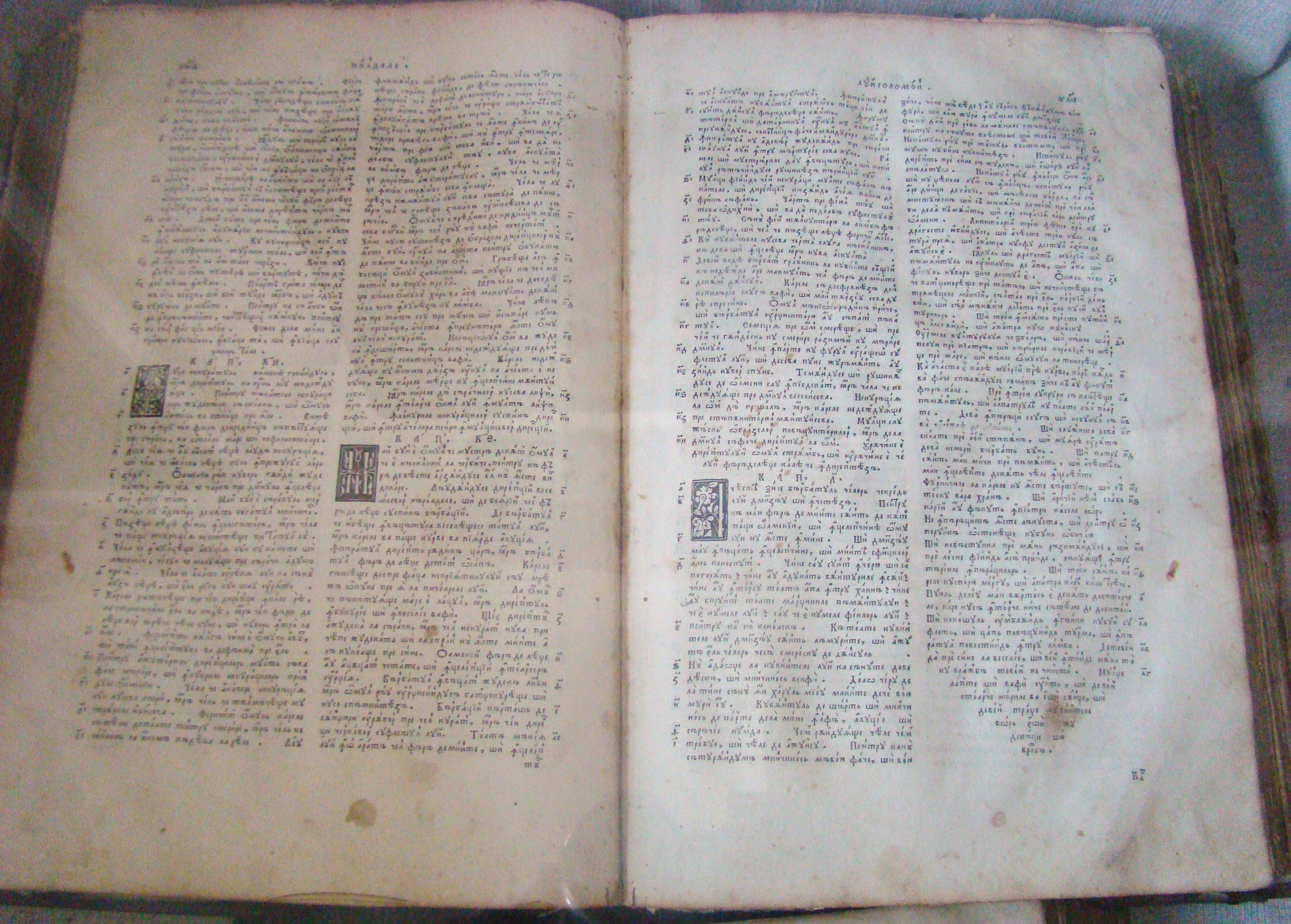
Caption showing pages 446-447 of the book, specifically the Book of Proverbs 27:14 - 30:33

The Bucharest Bible (Romanian: Biblia de la București), also known as the Cantacuzino Bible, was the first complete translation of the Bible into the Romanian language, published in Bucharest in 1688. It was ordered and patronized by Șerban Cantacuzino, then-ruler of Wallachia, and overseen by logothete Constantin Brâncoveanu.

== See also ==
- Bible translations into Romanian
