= Cuibul cu barză Church =

Romanian Orthodox monastery in Bucharest, Romania

Coordinates: 44.439665°N 26.081192°E

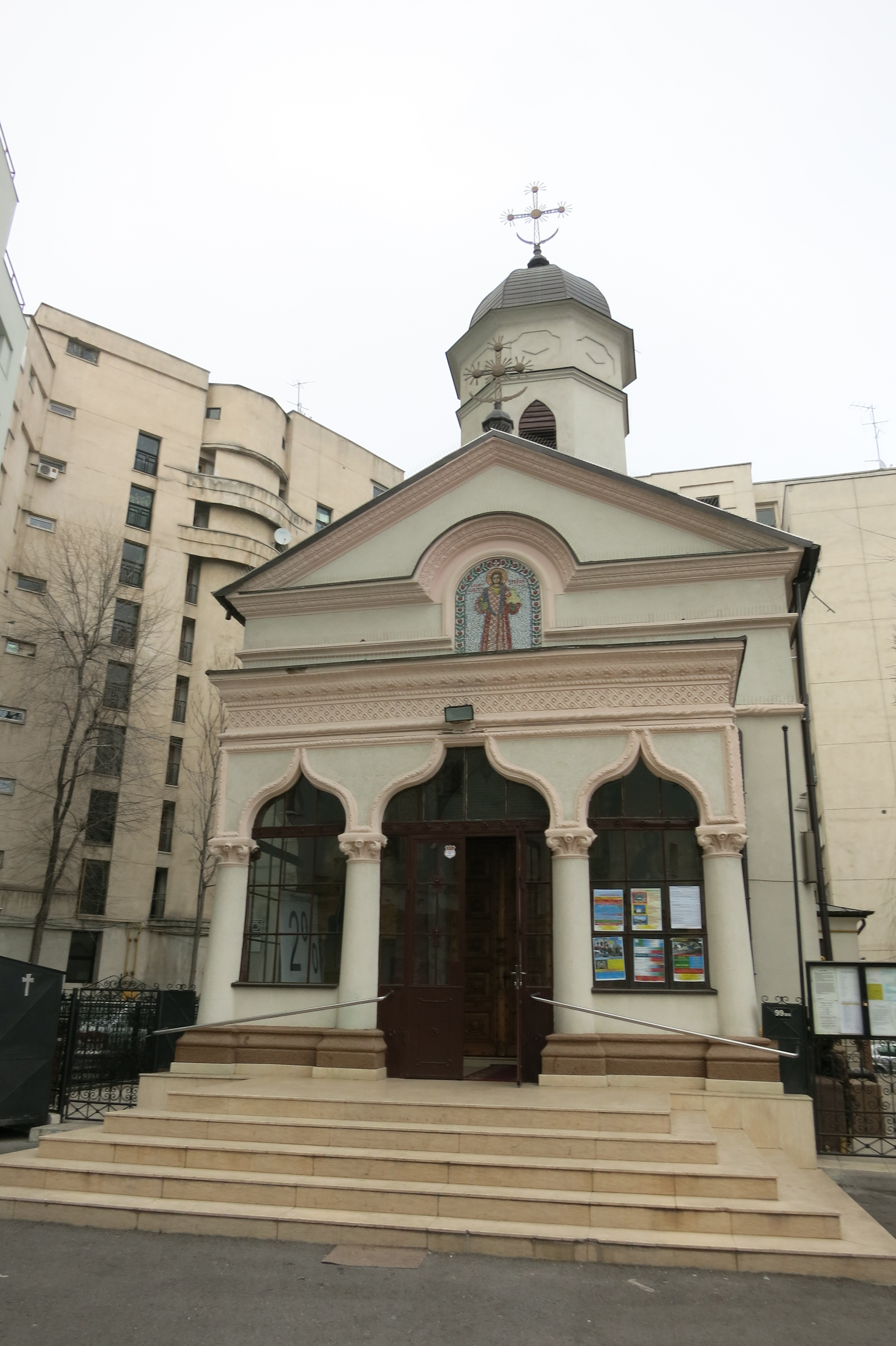
The Cuibul cu barză Church

The Cuibul cu barză Church (meaning the Stork-nest Church) dedicated to the Saint Stephen is a Romanian Orthodox church located at 99bis Știrbei Vodă Street in Bucharest's Sector 1. As mentioned on the inscription, placed after the 1898 rehabilitation at the entrance of the church, the name is due to the nests which storks had built on the building's shingle roof.

According to documentary evidence from the beginning of the 18th century, a small church existed on the site. A new church was built by the clucer Dona and his wife Zamfira. who were buried in the church in 1830. Their tombstones are preserved in the naos.

The church needed frequent repairs. After the first repairs, carried out in 1853, the main dome had to be rebuilt in 1877 and in 1898, the church was completely rehabilitated by architect Toma Dobrescu. The church was repainted in neobyzantine style by Vasile Damian, a priest and painter. The pillars separating the pronaos from the nave were eliminated. A new church porch with three arches was added to the building. The church was included in the list of historic monuments.

In the 1920s the church was the subject of a major controversy between its priest, Teodor Popescu (alongside his deacon, Dumitru Cornilescu), and the Patriarchy. The two clerics displayed protestant tendencies and were eventually defrocked. They, alongside some parishioners, will go on to form the Evangelical Church of Romania.

The 1977 earthquake severely damaged the Cuibul cu Barză Church. Consolidation works, including concrete reinforcements around the foundation and the dome were started in 1984. A mosaic was fixed on the western façade and the painting was cleaned and restored.

After the completion of the restoration, in 1987, the church was scheduled for demolition, due to the new town planning for the Știrbei Vodă area. A group of concerned technicians under the leadership of engineer Eugen Iordăchescu, technical director of the "Proiect București" design institute were able to come with a solution of saving the church, by moving it 12 m (39 ft) southward. The translation of the building was completed on February 22, 1988. A new high-rise was built, to hide the view of the church from the main street, the access being possible only by a narrow road from Vasile Pârvan Street. The new church was reconsecrated on November 21, 1990.

A grammar school, called "Cuibul cu Barză School" was built next to the church. The school was attended by George Călinescu, Eugen Filotti, Dumitru Cornilescu, and other notable people. The school's old building was torn down in the late 1980s and a new school, called "Music and Visual Arts School No. 3 – Cuibul cu Barză" was built in the neighborhood.

== Gallery ==
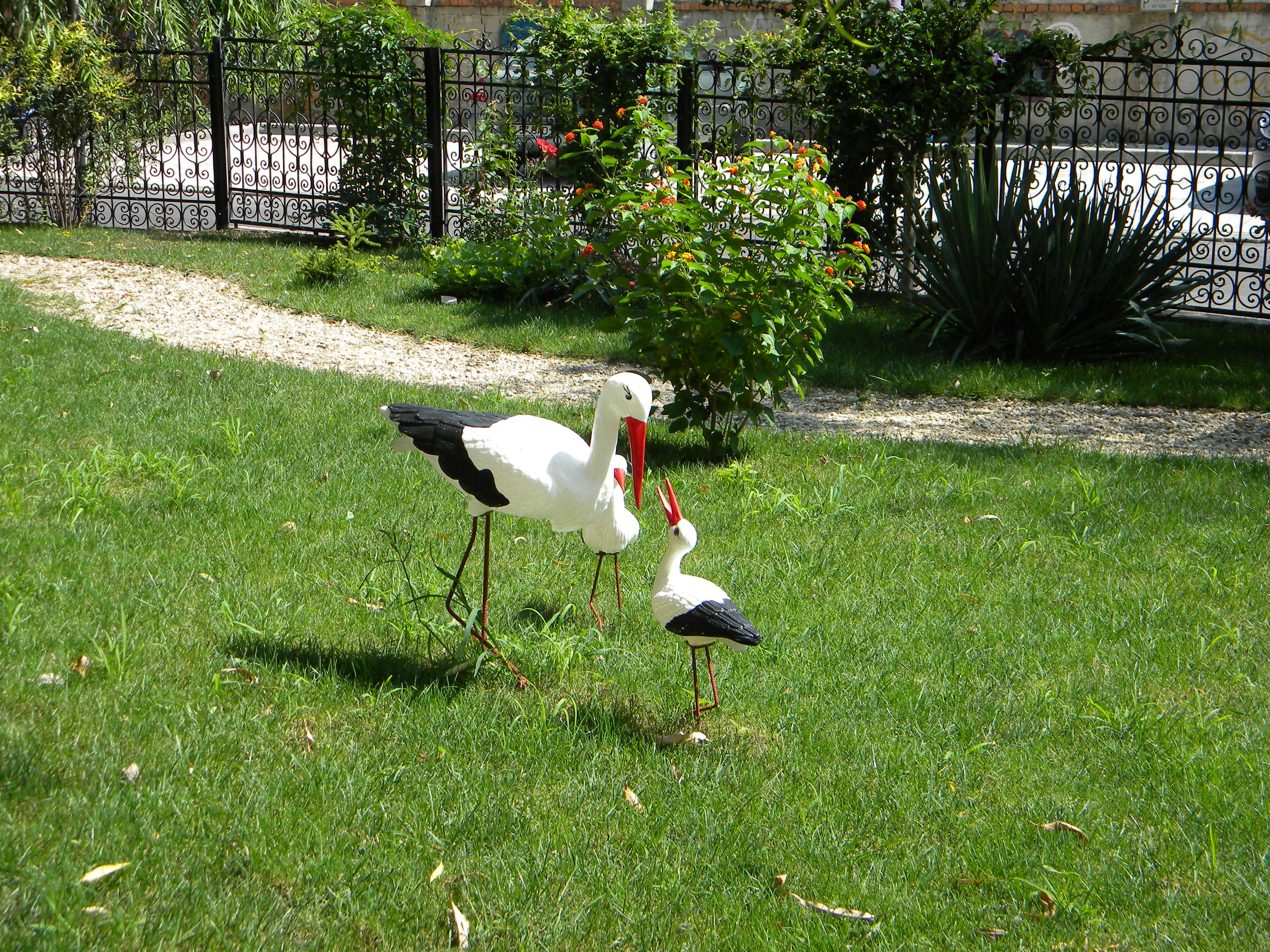

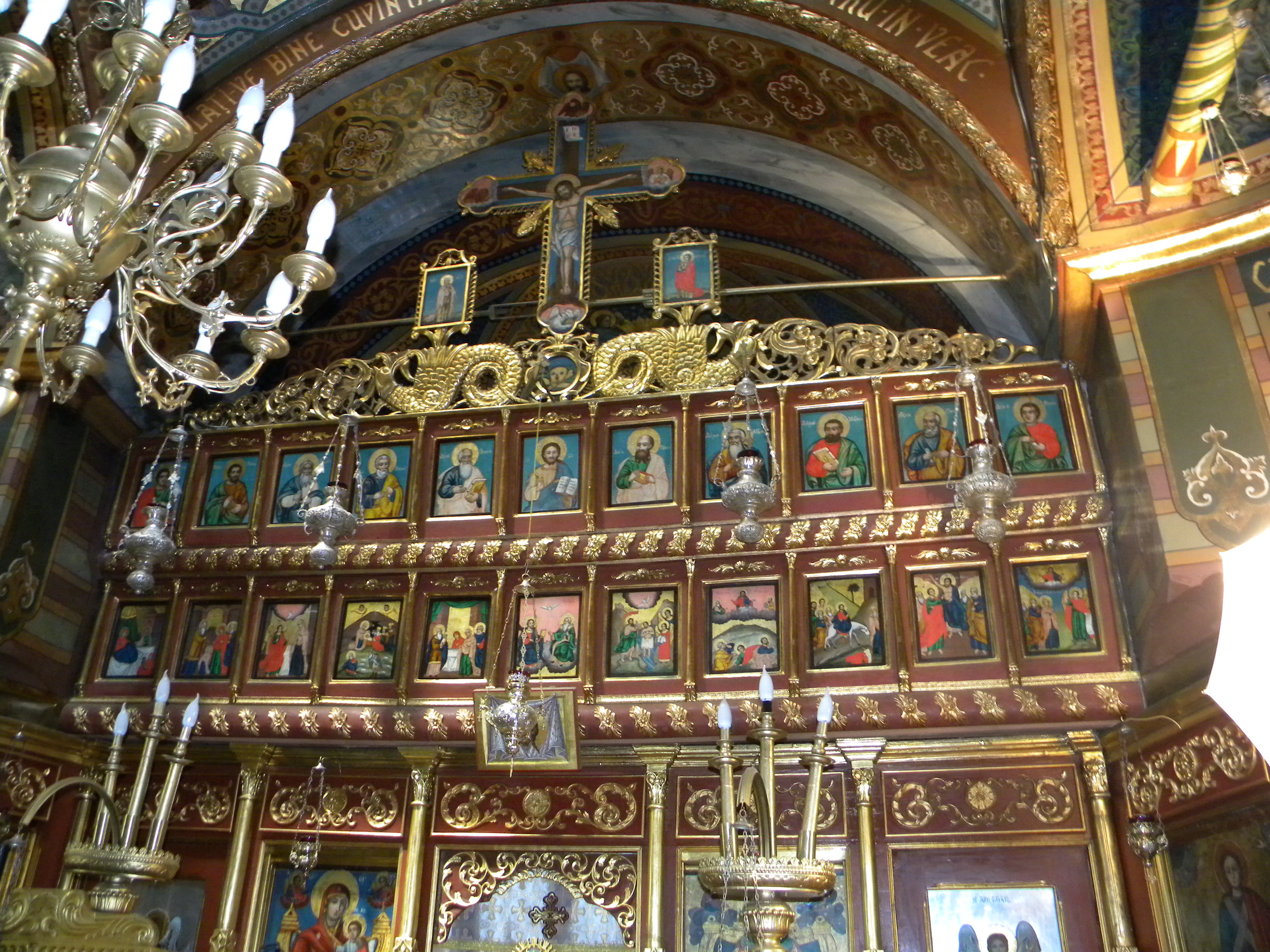

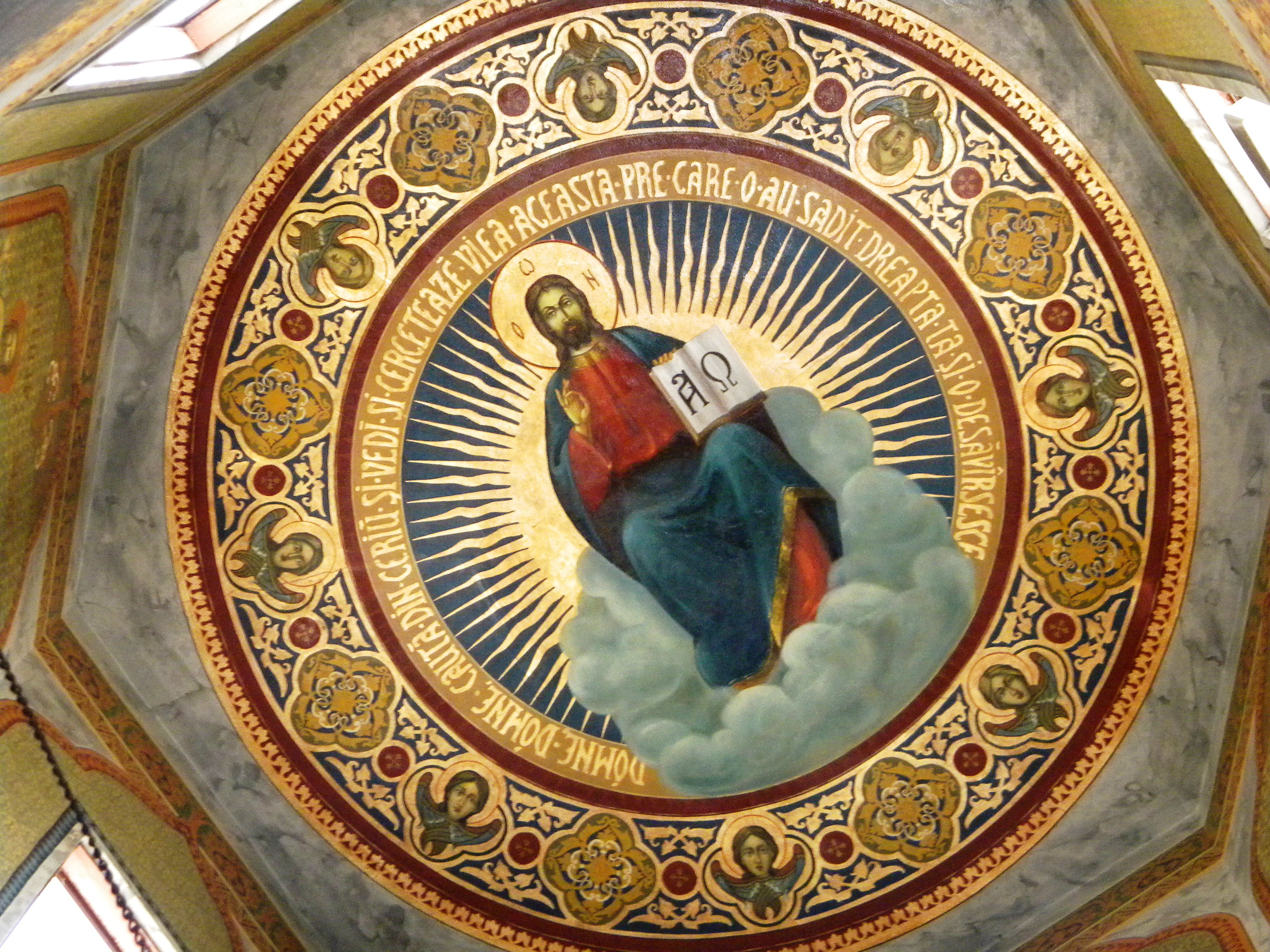

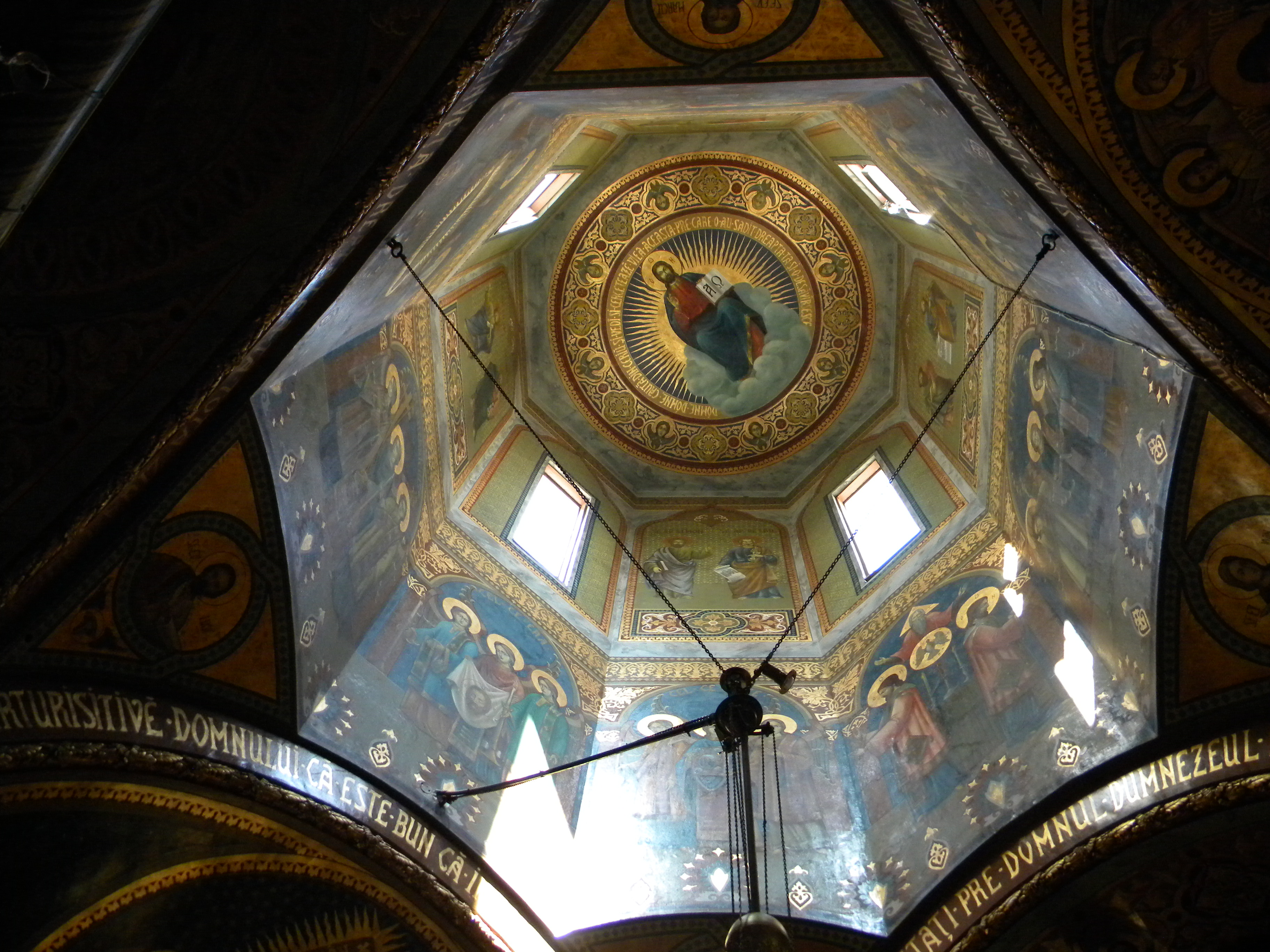

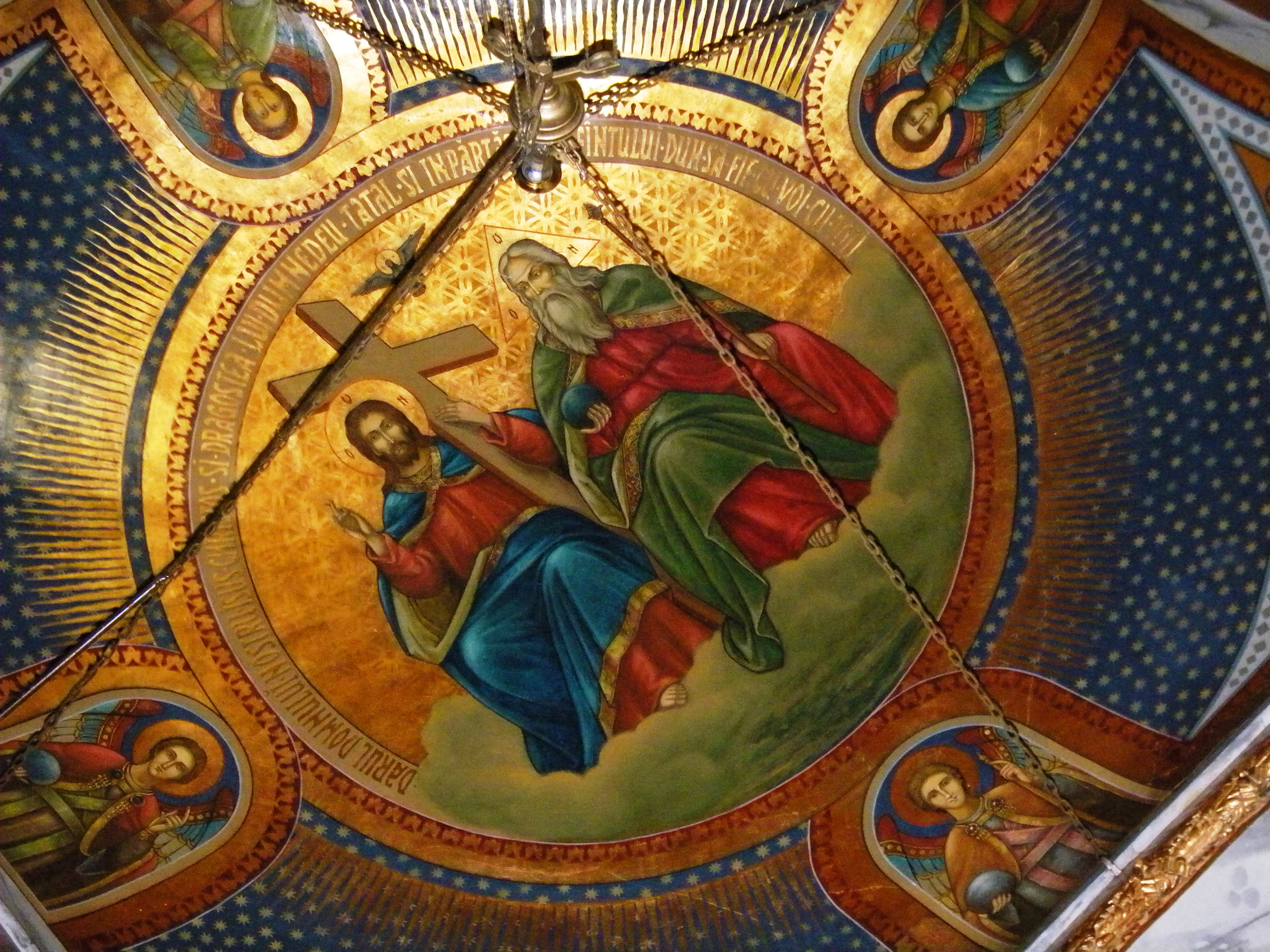
