= Gudina Tumsa =

Ethiopian Lutheran theologian (1929–1979)

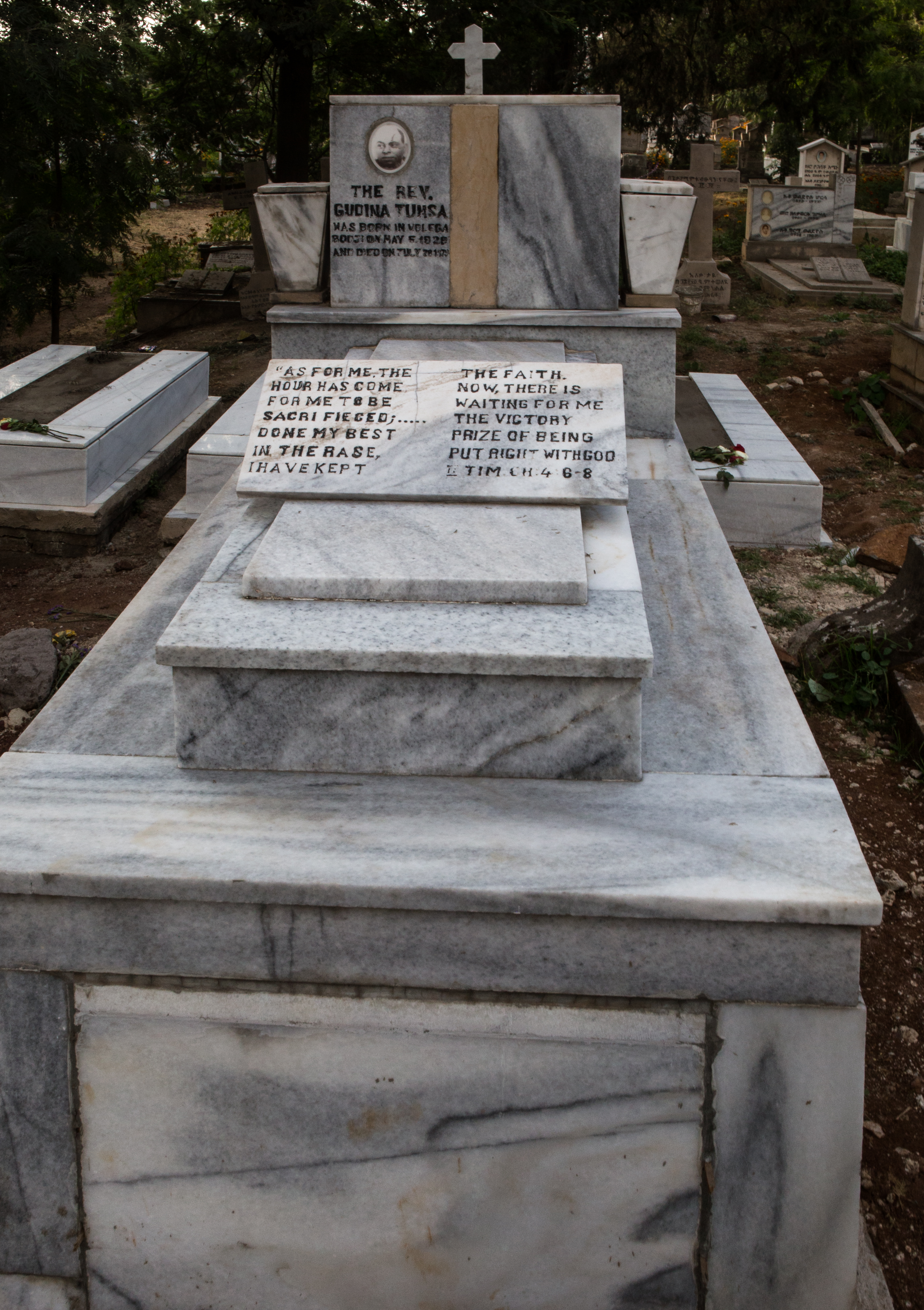
Grave of Gudina Tumsa in Addis Abeba

Gudina Tumsa (1929 – 28 July 1979) was an Ethiopian Lutheran and Evangelical Christian theologian and General Secretary of the Ethiopian Evangelical Church Mekane Yesus (EECMY).

He was born in Bodji, Wollega, Ethiopia. Gudina helped form the Council for Cooperation of Churches in Ethiopia, an ecumenical and interdenominational council, and was elected its first chairman. Tumsa "gave his church a decisive push towards independence in theological thought and church practice", criticizing many aspects of Western Christianity. Much of his theology is contained in the letters he wrote to church leaders and the general public, as well as in the addresses he gave at various conferences around the world in the 1960s and 1970s.

== Theology ==
=== Gudina Tumsa, Emmanuel Abraham, and Holistic Theology ===
Gudina Tumsa is in many regards the father of the indigenous theological thought of the EECMY, and especially its Holistic Theology also known as "Serving the Whole Person" theology. In fact, a study of his theology and the theology of Emmanuel Abraham (a colleague, contemporary, and friend) comprises a large portion of the EECMY theology. Tumsa studied theology in the United States, and because of this gained a relatively broad understanding of mission and the church. Upon returning to Ethiopia, he "gave his church a decisive push towards independence in theological thought and church practice", criticizing many aspects of Western Christianity. Much of his theology is contained in the letters he wrote to church leaders and the general public, as well as in the addresses he gave at various conferences around the world in the 1960s and 1970s.

The main points of his theology center on a holistic hermeneutic that not only encompasses a broad ontology, but which also applies itself to both the life in this world and in the next. His theology can be portrayed as a type of liberation theology, but cannot be categorized strictly in this class; indeed, it contains a uniquely Ethiopian flavor, "a theology of liberation in the Ethiopian context", as Tasgara Hirpo describes it. Tumsa describes his own theology as a "holistic theology", writing in a memo to Abraham that "western theology has lost the this-worldly dimension of human existence"; according to him, his holistic theology is merely "an effort in rediscovering total human life" in all its width and breadth. It does not allow the suffering of this world to eclipse the joy of the next – the physical reality to overtake the spiritual – but instead he says that both are in need of redemption, salvation, and liberation.

In this regard, Abraham and Tumsa differ in their approach to state involvement. For several years, Abraham held a position in the government that allowed him significant sway within political circles, all the while remaining faithful to the EECMY, of which he was president for 22 years. He tended toward unity with the central powers rather than "rocking the boat," even though he saw his people suffering oppression. Tumsa was more willing to part with the central powers in favor of the oppressed people of his church, as evidenced by his omission of Emperor Haile Selassie's name from the normal intercessions in the Sunday liturgy in the months leading up to the socialist revolution in response to the feudal system that Tumsa saw as an instrument of oppression.

Yet, however divergent their perspectives on church-state relations may appear, there was unity in that they both supported the creation of quasi-public institutions of education, health, and vocational training that the government not only supported, but also maintained when the network of institutions outgrew the administrative capability of the EECMY. They were both dedicated to a church that worked in conjunction with the state for the development of better lives for their countrymen; where they differed was the measure of allegiance they meted out to the government or to the people. Either way, the EECMY took seriously their commission to carry their message into the world.

=== Ecumenism and Western theological criticism ===
Tumsa emerged as the leader of the movement to develop a characteristically Ethiopian theology and to share it for the edification not only of the nation, but also of other Christians abroad. He described the goal of the EECMY in relation to its global sister churches as "self-reliance" and "interdependence". "Independence is a legitimate political aim; it can never be an acceptable theological aim for the church," Tumsa said in a debate. His life showcased this in that, even as he urged the church to gain an independent theology based on the Ethiopian experience, he was also constantly in conversation with brothers and sisters in other nations, engaging in several multinational theological conferences.

In reference to Western theology, Gudina was both familiar and critical, having been trained at Luther Seminary in Minnesota, which gave him a solid foundation for theologizing in Ethiopia. In contrast to the Holistic Theology that characterized both his perspective and that of the EECMY, Tumsa perceived that there was too great a disconnect between Western theology and ethics, and was said to have promoted a praxis-reflection-praxis ethical model. He thought this provided an interesting alternative to the prevalent church-state separation that he believed characterized the American church. Tumsa wanted Western Christians to reexamine their actions in light of a Holistic theological framework. He urged them to reevaluate their ethical consciousness in light of national and global societal problems.

Finally, Tumsa's perspective on ecumenism theology is brought to light in Tumsa's and Abraham's 1972 report "On the Interrelation between Proclamation of the Gospel and Human Development." Among other arguments, they discussed the "simply frightening" reality arising as a result of the rapid growth and "phenomenal expansion" of the Christian Church across Africa in the last few decades. They asserted that not only will this result in an immense shortage of "physical plant" (e.g. church buildings, religious education, literacy programs, etc.) in countries such as Ethiopia who are struggling with so much growth, but it also establishes the "'center of gravity' in the Christian world" firmly on the African continent. This puts immense theological responsibility on the "historically young churches" of the world, which are not only dealing with a lack of theological experience and history, but will also have to manage a shortage of resources available to solve these mounting difficulties.

== Death ==
Tumsa was abducted and killed by Derg soldiers on 28 July 1979, and has been called the "Dietrich Bonhoeffer of Africa" in the years following.

== Gudina Tumsa Foundation ==
Inspired by Tumsa's life, the Gudina Tumsa Foundation was founded in 1992 to help people who are "suffering physically as well as those longing for justice and freedom."

== Gudina Tumsa Theological Forum ==
In 2008, a group of youth Ethiopian theologians formed the Gudina Tumsa Theological Forum to "provide a platform for sound theological reflection on developments within the church and society at large."
